= Fersaf, Tillo =

Village in Siirt Province, Turkey

Fersaf
- Village
- Location within Turkey
- Coordinates: 37.977°N 42.007°E
- Country: Turkey
- Province: Siirt
- District: Tillo
- Population (2022): 228
- Time zone: UTC+3 (TRT)

Fersaf, formerly Dereyamaç, is a village in the Tillo District of Siirt Province in Turkey. It is 7 kilometers from the town of Tillo.

The village is populated by Arabic-speaking Arabs. It has a population of 239 (2025).

== Population ==
The population of the area has been decreasing rapidly.

Historic population figures of the village:

Historical population
Year	Pop.	±%
1965	788	—
1970	905	+14.8%
1980	622	−31.3%
1990	593	−4.7%
2000	354	−40.3%
2010	267	−24.6%
2020	239	−10.5%
2022	228	−4.6%

== Name ==
In a government list of 1928, the village is listed as Fersaf or فرساف. However, in a government list of 1968, the village is listed as Dereyamaç (literally "creek slope"; Turkish: dere + yamaç). In 2014, the name was changed back to Fersaf.

The village name also appears as Firsaf, Firsâf, or Fírsêf in some records.

== Dialect ==
The village dialect of Arabic differs from Modern Standard Arabic and from other local dialects of Arabic. One of the main differences is the prevalence of imāla, the fronting and raising of vowel sounds, probably influenced by local Kurdish dialects.

Distinctive Arabic vocabulary of the village includes (in Turkish transliteration)

- tarîḳ (way, path, road)
- fiyu (within)
- ûl (say, tell)
- arf (place)
- sıcra (tree)
- pışşûné (cat)
- tavîlé (barn)
- şaḳavḳıré (frog)
- şaḳḳôḳ (pear)
- ‘ıcíbtu (I liked)
- meymé (grandmother)
- híş (hush)
- bôvş (much, many)

== History ==
According to legend, 7th-century Arab commander Khalid ibn al-Walid pitched his tent north of what is now Fersaf while attacking Siirt.

The Firsafî family of Qadiri sheikhs is said to have settled around Siirt and Hazro after fleeing the Mongol invasions. Sheikh Şeref of the family settled in Fersef.

In 1844, Sheikh Muhammed al-Fersafi (Sheikh al-Hazin) opened a madrasa in the village which was active until at least 1903.

== Notable features ==
- Tombs:
  - Tomb of Sheikh Taha and his siblings
  - Tomb of Sheikh al-Hazin (Şeyh-ul Hazin)
- Cas houses: Traditional houses of the Siirt area, built in the shape of a truncated pyramid using stone and gypsum plaster.
- Trees:
  - A living tree near the grave of Sheikh al-Hazin was not touched during the construction of his tomb and still protrudes from the structure.
  - Many old terebinth (menengiç or bıttım) trees aged 150 to 400 years grow around the village.
