= Akyayla, Tillo =

Village in Siirt Province, Turkey

Akyayla
- Village
- Location within Turkey
- Coordinates: 37.916°N 42.137°E
- Country: Turkey
- Province: Siirt
- District: Tillo
- Population (2022): 713
- Time zone: UTC+3 (TRT)

Akyayla, formerly Kılbasan, (Kurdish: Nepîle) is a village in the Tillo District of Siirt Province in Turkey. The village is populated by Kurds of the Botikan tribe and had a population of 713 in 2022.

The hamlet of Kargacık is attached to Akyayla.

== Population ==
Historic population figures of the village:

Historical population
Year	Pop.	±%
1990	440	—
2000	446	+1.4%
2010	597	+33.9%
2020	672	+12.6%
2022	713	+6.1%
