= İkizbağlar, Tillo =

Village in Siirt Province, Turkey

İkizbağlar
- Village
- Location within Turkey
- Coordinates: 37.979°N 41.973°E
- Country: Turkey
- Province: Siirt
- District: Tillo
- Population (2022): 498
- Time zone: UTC+3 (TRT)

İkizbağlar or Tom is a village in the Tillo District of Siirt Province in Turkey. The village is populated by Arabs and had a population of 490 in 2022.

== Population ==
Historic population figures of the village:

Historical population
Year	Pop.	±%
1965	541	—
1970	697	+28.8%
1980	762	+9.3%
1990	743	−2.5%
2000	688	−7.4%
2010	567	−17.6%
2020	488	−13.9%
2022	490	+0.4%
