= Taşbalta, Tillo =

Village in Siirt Province, Turkey

Taşbalta
- Village
- Location within Turkey
- Coordinates: 37.982°N 42.064°E
- Country: Turkey
- Province: Siirt
- District: Tillo
- Population (2022): 97
- Time zone: UTC+3 (TRT)

Taşbalta (Kurdish: Sivê) is a village in the Tillo District of Siirt Province in Turkey. The village is populated by Kurds and had a population of 97 in 2022.

The hamlets of Bakacak and Kavacık are attached to Taşbalta.

== Population ==
Historic population figures of the village:

Historical population
Year	Pop.	±%
1970	185	—
1980	198	+7.0%
1990	161	−18.7%
2000	86	−46.6%
2010	97	+12.8%
2020	109	+12.4%
2022	97	−11.0%
