= Hatrant, Tillo =

Village in Siirt Province, Turkey

Hatrant
- Village
- Location within Turkey
- Coordinates: 37.914°N 42.004°E
- Country: Turkey
- Province: Siirt
- District: Tillo
- Population (2022): 306
- Time zone: UTC+3 (TRT)

Hatrant, formerly Çınarlısu, is a village in the Tillo District of Siirt Province in Turkey. The village is populated by Kurds of the Keşkoliyan tribe and had a population of 306 in 2022.

The hamlets of Çavuşlu and Erenler are attached to Akyayla.

== Population ==
Historic population figures of the village:

Historical population
Year	Pop.	±%
1970	538	—
1980	455	−15.4%
1990	568	+24.8%
2000	289	−49.1%
2010	330	+14.2%
2020	319	−3.3%
2022	306	−4.1%
