= Sinep, Tillo =

Village in Siirt Province, Turkey

Sinep
- Village
- Location within Turkey
- Coordinates: 37.972°N 42.030°E
- Country: Turkey
- Province: Siirt
- District: Tillo
- Population (2022): 192
- Time zone: UTC+3 (TRT)

Sinep, formerly Çatılı, is a village in the Tillo District of Siirt Province in Turkey. The village is populated by Arabs and had a population of 192 in 2022.

== Population ==
Historic population figures of the village:

Historical population
Year	Pop.	±%
1965	439	—
1970	308	−29.8%
1980	358	+16.2%
1990	349	−2.5%
2000	210	−39.8%
2010	187	−11.0%
2020	193	+3.2%
2022	192	−0.5%

The population of the village has been decreasing for the last 60 years due to migration to İstanbul and other cities nearby
