= Efkan Ala =

Turkish politician (born 1965)

Efkan Ala MP
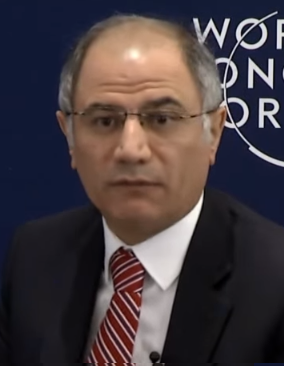
- Ala in 2014

Minister of the Interior
- In office 24 November 2015 – 31 August 2016
- Prime Minister: Ahmet Davutoğlu, Binali Yıldırım
- Preceded by: Selami Altınok
- Succeeded by: Süleyman Soylu
- In office 25 December 2013 – 7 March 2015
- Prime Minister: Recep Tayyip Erdoğan, Ahmet Davutoğlu
- Preceded by: Muammer Güler
- Succeeded by: Sebahattin Öztürk

Member of the Grand National Assembly
- Incumbent
- Assumed office 7 June 2015
- Constituency: Erzurum (June 2015); Bursa (Nov 2015); Bursa (II) (2018); Bursa (I) (2023)

Undersecretary to the Prime Minister of Turkey
- In office 10 October 2007 – 25 December 2013
- Prime Minister: Recep Tayyip Erdoğan
- Preceded by: Mehmet Emin Zararsız
- Succeeded by: Fahri Kasırga

Governor of Diyarbakır
- In office 14 September 2004 – 10 September 2007
- Preceded by: Nusret Miroğlu
- Succeeded by: Hüseyin Avni Mutlu

Governor of Batman
- In office 2003 – 14 September 2004
- Preceded by: İsa Parlak
- Succeeded by: Haluk İmga

Personal details
- Born: 21 February 1965 (age 61) Oltu, Erzurum Province, Turkey
- Education: Istanbul University
- Occupation: Politician, civil servant
- Cabinet: 61st, 62nd, 64th, 65th

Efkan Ala (born 21 February 1965) is a Turkish politician and former civil servant who served as a member of the Grand National Assembly of Erzurum and Bursa. He served as Minister of the Interior from 2013-2015 and again from 2015 to 2016. Before entering politics he served as a governor of Batman and Diyarbakır and as undersecretary to the Prime Minister of Turkey. He had held senior positions in the Justice and Development Party (AK Party) including responsibility and the position of General Vice Chairman.

== Early life ==
Ala was born on 21 February 1965 in Oltu, Erzurum Province, Turkey. He studied political science at Istanbul University, and graduated in 1987. He went to Torquay language school in England in 1989–1990.

== Career ==
=== Civil service ===
In 1988, he began his civil service career as a district governor trainee. After working two years at the governor's office in Sakarya Province, and a one-year professional study in the United Kingdom, he became a district governor, and served two years in each townships of Dernekpazarı, Trabzon and Kabataş, Ordu. Ala was appointed Deputy Province Governor in Tunceli.

After serving at various positions in different ministries, he was made the Governor of Batman Province in 2003, where he served one year. On 14 September 2004, he was appointed as the Governor of Diyarbakır Province, remaining in that post until 2007.

On 10 September 2007, Ala became the Undersecretary to the Prime Minister.

=== Minister of the Interior ===
On 25 December 2013, Minister of the Interior Muammer Güler stepped down along with two of other cabinet members following a corruption investigation, which involved his son. The same day, Prime Minister Erdogan announced a cabinet reshuffle with ten new names. The next day, on 26 December, Efkan Ala assumed office as the Minister of the Interior as a non-member of the parliament, a move that was sharply criticized by some MPs of the prime minister's own AKP as well as by the leadership of the opposition CHP.

Ala resigned from the cabinet on 31 August 2016, having been criticised consistently by the opposition for failing to tackle growing terrorism by the Kurdistan Workers' Party (PKK), Islamic State of Iraq and the Levant (ISIL) and the Gülen movement (FETÖ). Attacks in Ankara, İstanbul and the south-east, as well as in the Syrian border provinces of Gaziantep and Kilis, had resulted in consistent calls for Ala's resignation, with criticism also being directed at how the Interior Ministry had appointed several Governors, police chiefs and bureaucrats throughout the country that were later identified to be supporters of FETÖ, the alleged organisation accused of staging a failed coup d'état attempt in July 2016. A reason for Ala's resignation was not given, though the main opposition Republican People's Party (CHP) claimed that Ala had been removed from office after the arrested Governor of Sinop and alleged FETÖ supporter had claimed he had close relations to Ala.

Political offices
Preceded by İsa Parlak	Governor of Batman Province; 2003 – 14 September 2004	Succeeded by Haluk İmga
Preceded by Nusret Miroğlu	Governor of Diyarbakır Province; 14 September 2004 – 10 September 2007	Succeeded by Hüseyin Avni Mutlu
Preceded by Mehmet Emin Zararsız	Prime Ministry's Undersecretary; 10 October 2007 – 25 December 2013	Succeeded by Fahri Kasırga
Preceded by Muammer Güler	Minister of the Interior; 25 December 2013 – 31 August 2016	Succeeded by Süleyman Soylu
Incumbent
