= Hüseyin Avni Mutlu =

Turkish civil servant and politician

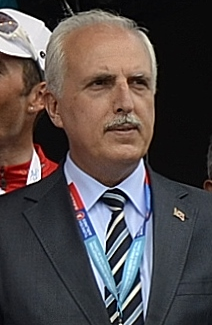

20th Governor of İstanbul
- In office 31 May 2010 – 25 September 2014
- President: Abdullah Gül; Recep Tayyip Erdoğan
- Preceded by: Muammer Güler
- Succeeded by: Vasip Şahin

59th Governor of Diyarbakır
- In office 10 September 2007 – 31 May 2010
- President: Abdullah Gül
- Preceded by: Efkan Ala
- Succeeded by: Mustafa Toprak

41st Governor of Siirt
- In office 18 July 2005 – 10 September 2007
- President: Ahmet Necdet Sezer; Abdullah Gül
- Preceded by: Murat Yıldırım
- Succeeded by: Necati Şentürk

Personal details
- Born: 1956 (age 69–70) Fındıklı, Rize Province, Turkey
- Education: Istanbul University
- Occupation: Civil servant

Hüseyin Avni Mutlu (born 1956) is a Turkish civil servant. He served as the Governor of Istanbul Province between 2010 and 2014.

== Early years and education ==
Hüseyin Avni Mutlu was born to a miner father in Fındıklı town of Rize Province, Turkey in 1956. He has four siblings. He completed primary education in Fatih, Istanbul.

After graduating from the Law School of Istanbul University, he was appointed candidate district governor (Turkish: kaymakam adayı) in Kocaeli Province in 1985. He then served as deputy district governor in Gerede, Bolu Province and Kargı, Çorum Province. In 1988, Mutlu was appointed district governor in Büyükorhan of Bursa province.

In 1991, he went to the USA for one year, where he was educated in English language. Following his return, he was assigned to Silopi, Şırnak Province as district governor serving until 1994. Between 1994 and 1995, he was deputy province governor in Şırnak, from 1995 to 1977 head of Habur Border Crossing Point in Silopi, and between 1997 and 2002 district governor in Eceabat, Çanakkale Province. The following year, he served as deputy province governor in Çanakkale. He was the district governor of Bağcılar in Istanbul Province from 2003 to 2005.

Mutlu is married to a now-retired teacher of history. The couple has two sons. One son studied business administration and the other was educated in law.

== Career ==
Between 2005 and 2007, he served as province governor of Siirt. On September 10, 2007, Mutlu was appointed governor of Diyarbakır Province succeeding Efkan Ala. On March 31, 2010, Mutlu became governor of Istanbul Province succeeding Muammer Güler. His term ended in 2014 when he was made governor without any responsibility. On 19 July 2016 he was dismissed due to his alleged connection with the Gülen movement.

== Gezi protests ==
On May 28, 2013, protests began, initially to contest the urban development plan for Istanbul's Taksim Gezi Park. Mass demonstrations spread across the country from Istanbul while riot police brutally tried to suppress the protesters.

During a meeting held between the Prime Minister Recep Tayyip Erdoğan, some cabinet members and representatives of students, academics and NGOs on June 12, 2013, Erdoğan told that he was informed late and incomplete about the course and the extent of the events in Taksim. He added that he had summoned the highest-ranked local civil servant responsible and censured him, who hereupon cried. One of the participants later told the daily Vatan that they perceived the person meant was Governor of Istanbul Hüseyin Avni Mutlu. Governor Mutlu denied this statement and asserted that the prime minister did not use the word "governor".

== Arrest ==
Mutlu was suspended from his position as a governor on July 17, 2016, shortly after the 2016 Turkish coup d'état attempt, which was allegedly orchestrated by the Gülen Movement. He was accused of having ties to the organization behind the takeover attempt. On July 26, he was detained as part of the investigation into the failed coup. He was arrested on August 5, 2016.

Political offices
Preceded by Muammer Güler	Governor of Istanbul; 31 May 2010 – 25 September 2014	Succeeded by Vasip Şahin
