= İbrahim Hakkı Erzurumi =

Ottoman scientist (1703 – 1780)

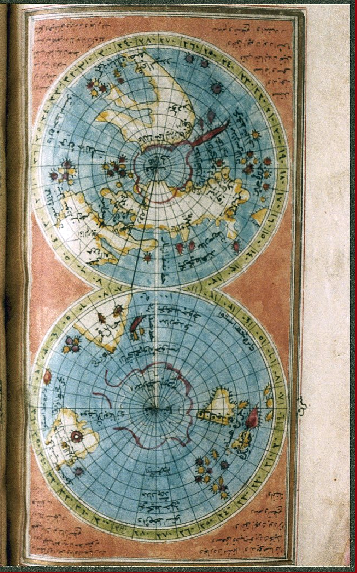
World map from the Marifetnâme of Ibrahim Hakki Erzurumi

Ibrahim Hakki Erzurumi (18 May 1703 – 22 June 1780), a popular Turkish Sufi saint of the Ottoman Empire from Erzurum in eastern Anatolia who was a polymath, mystic, poet, author, astronomer, physicist, physician, psychologist, sociologist, philosopher, Hanafi Maturidi Islamic scholar and encyclopedist.

== Life and Works ==
Having lost his mother and later his father at an early age, Ibrahim Hakkı was raised by his uncle who educated him for a while. He met the Ottoman Sultan Mahmut I at Istanbul in 1747. He returned to Erzurum, and was continuously interested in religious and scientific matters. Having written 15 books in the manzum and regular styles and a great number in Turkish, Arabic, and Persian languages, amongst Ibrahim Hakki's most important works are the Divan and Marifetname.

In 1756 he published Marifetnâme (Book of Gnosis), a compilation and commentary on astronomy, mathematics, anatomy, psychology, philosophy, and Islamic mysticism. It is famous for containing the first treatment of post-Copernican astronomy by a Muslim scholar ('ālim). Marifetname contains tasawwuf knowledge along with a wide range of general scientific and encyclopedic knowledge. Completed in 1757, the book was written in the language of the layman. According to the author, it was compiled from 400 books.

Marifetname is a first in the explanation of observational astronomy of the Solar System by a scholar in a book. An English translation was published in 2010.

He died and was buried in Tillo of Siirt Province.

== Theology ==
Core to Erzurumi's philosophy is that self-examination is absolutely necessary as part of the process of discovering God:

Allah has revealed in His Divine Books, and has sent His prophets as guides to help lead us back to heedfulness. Only those who are able to wake up and rediscover that which is holy within themselves can come close to our Creator, which is perfection.

He is widely quoted for saying, "If we take one step towards Allah, He will come running to meet us," which is derived from a hadith qudsi.

His most popular poem, which was composed into a religious hymn, is Hak Şerleri Hayr Eyler, The Truth (God) Makes Evils Turn Out Good.

== Notes ==
- Hadith Qudsi 15. On the authority of Abu Hurayrah, who said that the Prophet, Allah bless him and give him peace, said: Allah the Almighty said: "I am as My servant thinks I am. I am with him when he makes mention of Me. If he makes mention of Me to himself, I make mention of him to Myself; and if he makes mention of Me in an assembly, I make mention of him in an assembly better than it. And if he draws near to Me an arm's length, I draw near to him a fathom's length. And if he comes to Me walking, I go to him at speed." Narrated by al-Bukhari, Muslim, al-Tirmidhi and Ibn Majah.
