= Tillo District =

District of Siirt Province, Turkey

Tillo
- District
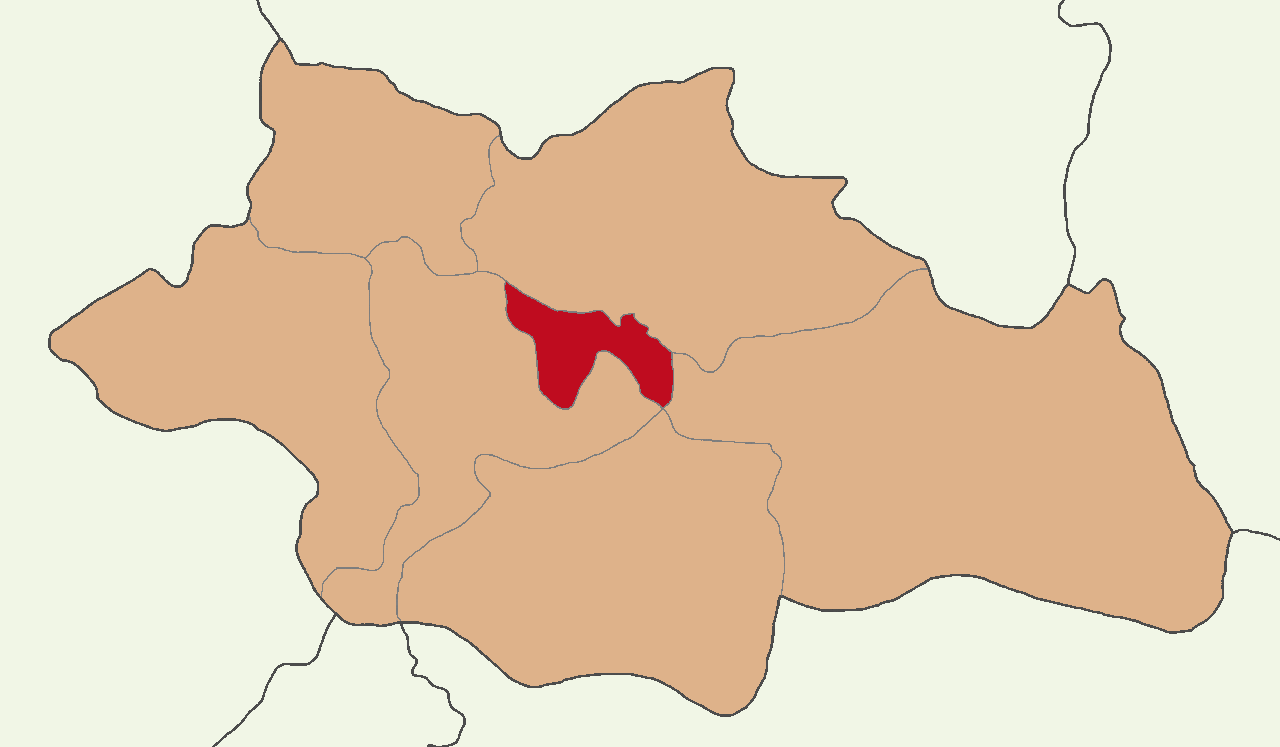
- Map showing Tillo District in Siirt Province
- Country: Turkey
- Province: Siirt
- Seat: Tillo
- Area: 138 km^{2} (53 sq mi)
- Population (2022): 4,048
  - Density: 29.3/km^{2} (76.0/sq mi)
- Time zone: UTC+3 (TRT)

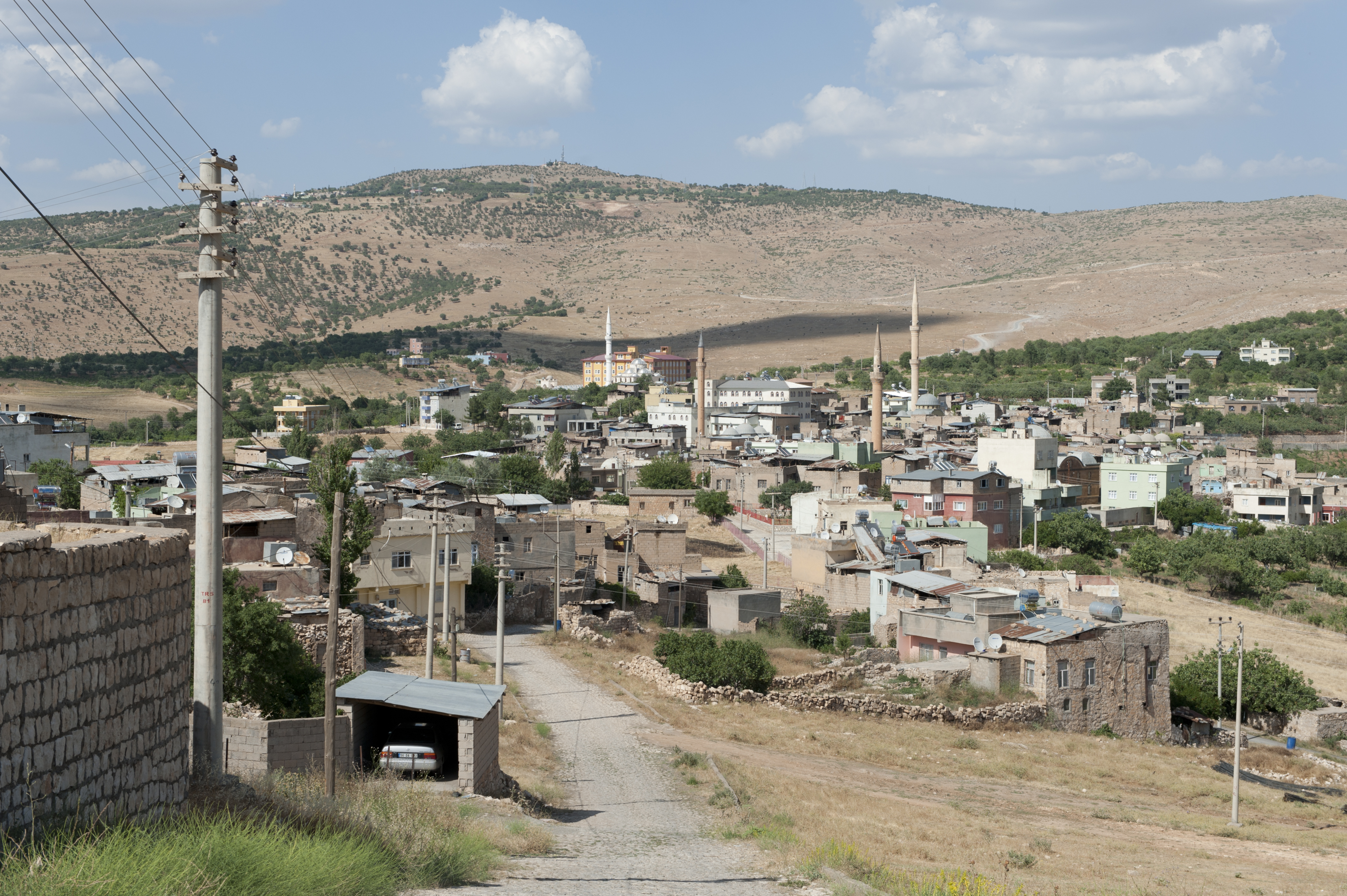
Tillo countryside

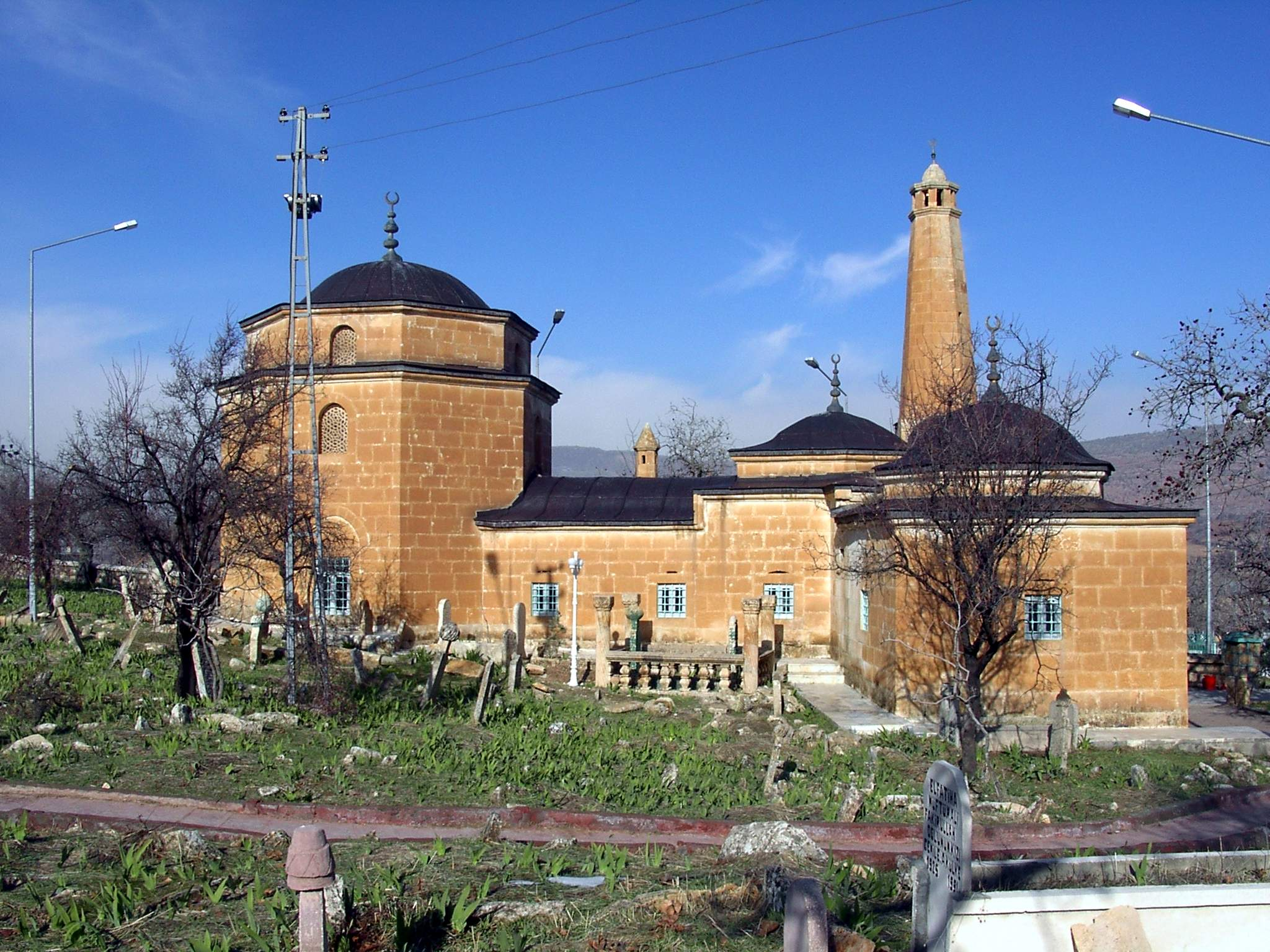
Ibrahim Hakkı shrine, also known as Tomb of İsmail Fakirullah in Tillo, Siirt

Tillo District is a district of Siirt Province in Turkey which has the town of Tillo as its seat. The district had a population of 4,048 in 2022. Its area is 138 km^{2}.

The district was established in 1990.

== Settlements ==
The district encompasses the municipality of Tillo, six villages and five hamlets.

=== Villages ===
1. Akyayla (Nepile)
2. Fersaf
3. Hatrant
4. İkizbağlar (Tom)
5. Sinep
6. Taşbalta (Sive)

== Population ==
Historic population figures of the district:

Historical population
Year	Pop.	±%
1970	5,140	—
1980	4,662	−9.3%
1990	5,203	+11.6%
2000	5,054	−2.9%
2010	3,930	−22.2%
2020	4,239	+7.9%
2022	4,048	−4.5%
