= Muammer Güler =

Turkish politician (born 1949)

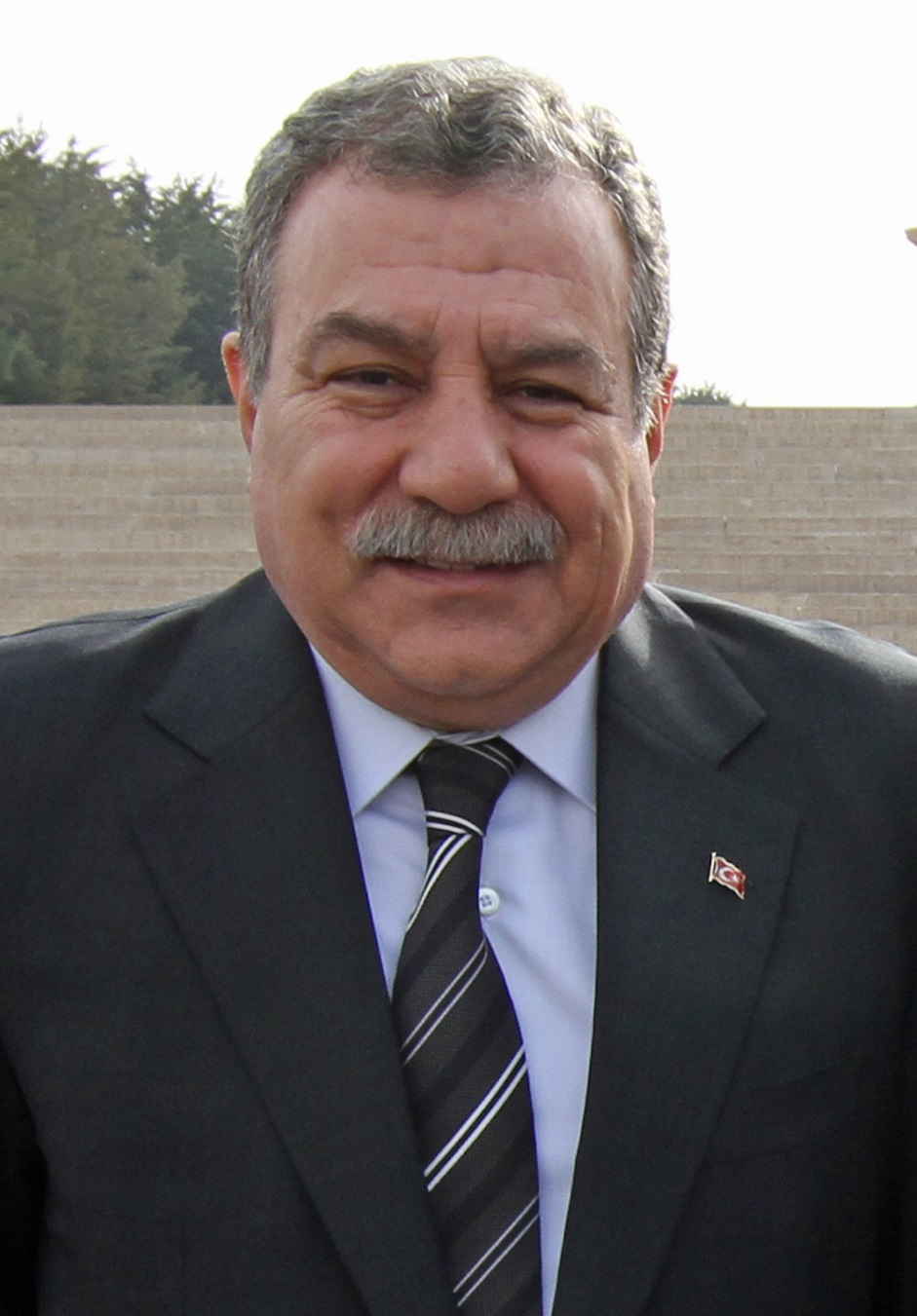

Minister of the Interior
- In office 24 January 2013 – 25 December 2013
- Prime Minister: Recep Tayyip Erdoğan
- Preceded by: İdris Naim Şahin
- Succeeded by: Efkan Ala

19th Governor of İstanbul
- In office 17 February 2003 – 31 March 2010
- President: Ahmet Necdet Sezer; Abdullah Gul
- Preceded by: Erol Çakır
- Succeeded by: Hüseyin Avni Mutlu

Personal details
- Born: 21 March 1949 (age 77) Mardin, Turkey
- Party: Justice and Development Party (AKP)
- Education: Ankara University, Law School
- Occupation: Politician

Muammer Güler (born 21 March 1949) is a Turkish Mhallami politician. He is a member of parliament from the Justice and Development Party (AKP). He was formerly the Governor of Istanbul Province and the Minister of the Interior under Prime Minister Recep Tayyip Erdoğan's government.

== Biography ==
Güler was born in Mardin, Turkey. He completed his primary education in Ankara and graduated from the Faculty of Law at the University of Ankara in 1972. Güler began his career as candidate District Governor on 14 March 1973 in Balıkesir. After taking post as Deputy District Governor of Çal in Denizli Province and then District Governor of Pehlivanköy in Kırklareli Province and Horasan in Erzurum Province, he was assigned to the Directorate of Personnel Branch at the Ministry of Interior, where he served as Branch Director and later as Director General.

On 16 September 1993, Güler was appointed governor of Niğde Province. From 29 January 1992 on he was the governor of Kayseri Province. After serving as governor of Gaziantep Province between 6 July 1994 and 28 July 2000, Güler moved to Samsun Province as governor. Starting 17 February 2003, he served as the governor of Istanbul Province. On 12 May 2010, Güler began the position of MOI Undersecretary for Security and Public Order. On 24 January 2013, he was appointed minister of interior, replacing İdris Naim Şahin in the post.

Güler has been married to Neval Güler, a retired math teacher, since 1977. They have a son, Barış Güler, and a daughter.

Some of Güler's critics have dubbed him "Chemical Muammer" (Turkish: Kimyasal Muammer), comparing him with "Chemical Ali". Among his other nicknames are "Neckless Muammer" (Turkish: Boyunsuz Muammer), "Neckless Muammer Pasha" (Turkish: Boyunsuz Muammer Paşa), and "Neckless Muammer Pasha, Governor of Dersaadet" (Turkish: Dersaadet Valisi Boyunsuz Muammer Paşa).

== 2013 corruption scandal ==
On 17 December 2013, Güler's son Barış Güler was arrested as a consequence of a corruption operation. Muammer Güler resigned as Minister of the Interior amid the scandal on 25 December, together with Minister of Economy Zafer Çağlayan and Minister of Environment and Urban Planning Erdoğan Bayraktar, both of whose own sons were also involved in the scandal.

== See also ==
- List of governors of Istanbul

Political offices
Preceded by Erol Çakır	Governor of Istanbul; 17 February 2003 – 31 March 2010	Succeeded by Hüseyin Avni Mutlu
Preceded by İdris Naim Şahin	Minister of the Interior; 24 January 2013 – 25 December 2013	Succeeded by Efkan Ala
