= Governor of Istanbul =

Governor of a Turkish Province

Governor of Istanbul İstanbul Valiliği
- Incumbent; Davut Gül since 2023
- Seat: Istanbul Governor's Office
- Appointer: President of Turkey; On the recommendation of the Turkish government
- Term length: No fixed term
- Inaugural holder: Esat Bey
- Formation: 1922
- Website: Office of the Governor

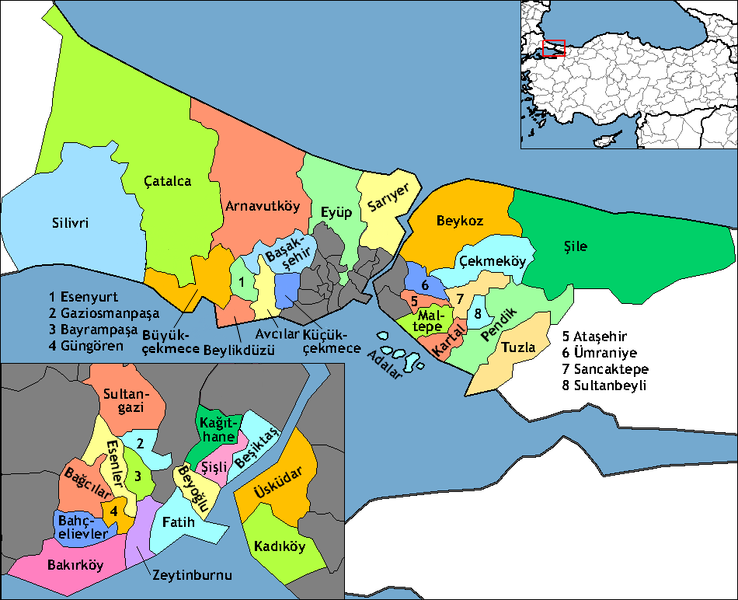
Map of the Province of İstanbul, showing the provincial districts.

The governor of Istanbul (Turkish: İstanbul Valiliği) is the civil service state official responsible for both national government and state affairs in the Province of Istanbul. Similar to the governors of the 80 other provinces of Turkey, the governor of Istanbul is appointed by the Government of Turkey and is responsible for the implementation of government legislation within Istanbul. The governor is also the most senior commander of both the Istanbul provincial police force and the Istanbul Gendarmerie.

== Appointment ==
The governor of Istanbul is appointed by the President of Turkey, who confirms the appointment after recommendation from the Turkish Government. The Ministry of the Interior first considers and puts forward possible candidates for approval by the cabinet. The governor of Istanbul is therefore not a directly elected position and instead functions as the most senior civil servant in the Province of Istanbul.

=== Term limits ===
The governor is not limited by any term limits and does not serve for a set length of time. Instead, the governor serves at the pleasure of the Government, which can appoint or reposition the governor whenever it sees fit. Such decisions are again made by the cabinet of Turkey. The governor of Istanbul, as a civil servant, may not have any close connections or prior experience in Istanbul Province. It is not unusual for governors to alternate between several different provinces during their bureaucratic career.

== Functions ==
The governor of Istanbul has both bureaucratic functions and influence over local government. The main role of the governor is to oversee the implementation of decisions by government ministries, constitutional requirements and legislation passed by Grand National Assembly within the provincial borders. The governor also has the power to reassign, remove or appoint officials of a certain number of public offices and has the right to alter the role of certain public institutions if they see fit. Governors are also the most senior public official within the Province, meaning that they preside over any public ceremonies or provincial celebrations being held due to a national holiday. As the commander of the provincial police and Gendarmerie forces, the governor can also take decisions designed to limit civil disobedience and preserve public order. Although mayors of municipalities and councillors are elected during local elections, the governor has the right to re-organise or to inspect the proceedings of local government despite being an unelected position.

== List of governors of Istanbul ==
Governors of Istanbul
No.	Name	Took office	Left office
1	Mithat Bey	24 December 1927	11 July 1928
2	Muhittin Üstündağ	14 July 1928	4 December 1938
3	Lütfi Kırdar	5 December 1938	20 October 1949
4	Fahrettin Kerim Gökay	24 October 1949	26 November 1957
5	Mümtaz Tarhan	29 November 1957	11 May 1958
6	Ethem Yetkiner	14 May 1958	27 May 1960
7	Refik Tulga	27 May 1960	26 February 1962
8	Niyazı Akı	6 March 1962	18 January 1966
9	Vefa Poyraz	18 January 1966	2 June 1973
10	Namık Kemal Şentürk	26 June 1973	25 October 1977
11	İhsan Tekin	7 February 1978	9 April 1979
12	Orhan Erbuğ	29 May 1979	6 December 1979
13	Nevzat Ayaz	7 December 1979	18 January 1988
14	B. Cahit Bayar	18 January 1988	19 August 1991
15	Hayri Kozakçıoğlu	19 August 1991	1 November 1995
16	Rıdvan Yenişen	4 November 1995	24 July 1997
17	Kutlu Aktaş	24 July 1997	4 August 1998
18	Erol Çakır	6 August 1998	16 February 2003
19	Muammer Güler	17 February 2003	31 March 2010
20	Hüseyin Avni Mutlu	31 March 2010	25 September 2014
21	Vasip Şahin	25 September 2014	1 November 2018
22	Ali Yerlikaya	1 November 2018	4 June 2023
23	Davut Gül	5 June 2023	

== See also ==
- List of mayors of Istanbul
- Governor (Turkey)
- Ministry of the Interior (Turkey)
