= Governor of Diyarbakır =

Governor of a Turkish Province

Governor of Diyarbakır Diyarbakır Valiliği
- Incumbent; Selçuk Aslan since January 16, 2026
- Appointer: President of Turkey; On the recommendation of the Turkish government
- Term length: No set term length or limit
- Inaugural holder: Mithat Bey; 1923
- Website: Office of the Governor

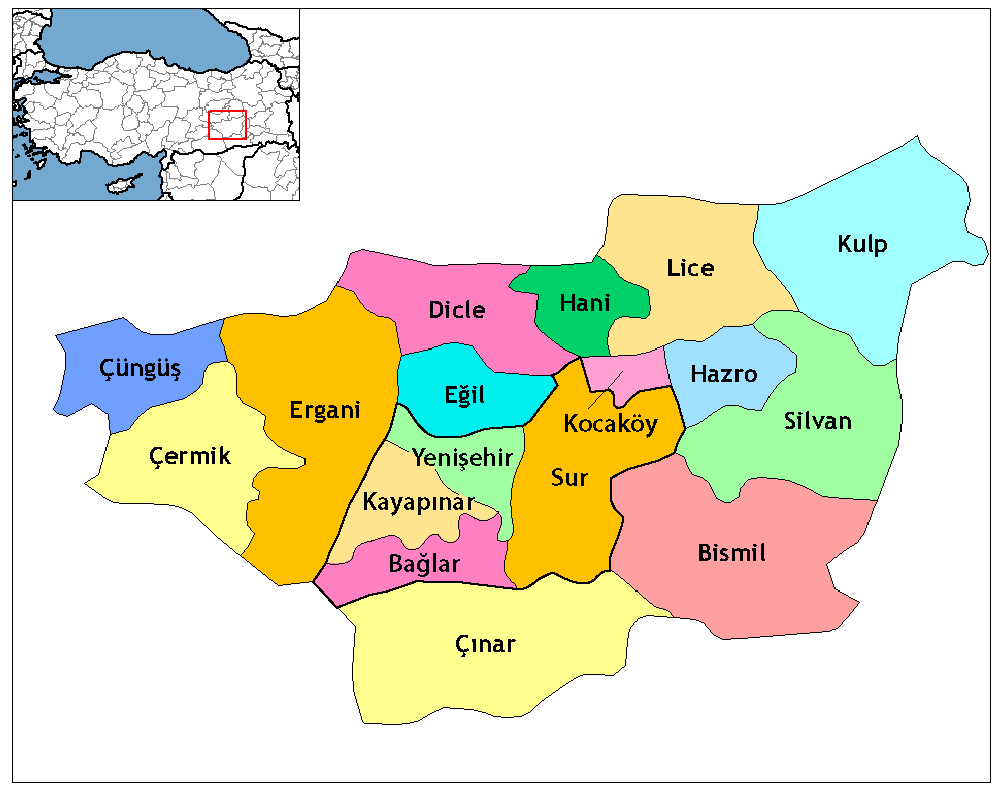
Map of the Province of Diyarbakır, showing the provincial districts.

The Governor of Diyarbakır (Turkish: Diyarbakır Valiliği) is the civil service state official responsible for both national government and state affairs in the Province of Diyarbakır. Similar to the Governors of the 80 other Provinces of Turkey, the Governor of Diyarbakır is appointed by the Government of Turkey and is responsible for the implementation of government legislation within Diyarbakır. The Governor is also the most senior commander of both the Diyarbakır provincial police force and the Diyarbakır Gendarmerie.

== Appointment ==
The Governor of Diyarbakır is appointed by the President of Turkey, who confirms the appointment after recommendation from the Turkish Government. The Ministry of the Interior first considers and puts forward possible candidates for approval by the cabinet. The Governor of Diyarbakır is therefore not a directly elected position and instead functions as the most senior civil servant in the Province of Diyarbakır.

=== Term limits ===
The Governor is not limited by any term limits and does not serve for a set length of time. Instead, the Governor serves at the pleasure of the Government, which can appoint or reposition the Governor whenever it sees fit. Such decisions are again made by the cabinet of Turkey. The Governor of Diyarbakır, as a civil servant, may not have any close connections or prior experience in Diyarbakır Province. It is not unusual for Governors to alternate between several different Provinces during their bureaucratic career.

== Functions ==
The Governor of Diyarbakır has both bureaucratic functions and influence over local government. The main role of the Governor is to oversee the implementation of decisions by government ministries, constitutional requirements and legislation passed by Grand National Assembly within the provincial borders. The Governor also has the power to reassign, remove or appoint officials a certain number of public offices and has the right to alter the role of certain public institutions if they see fit. Governors are also the most senior public official within the Province, meaning that they preside over any public ceremonies or provincial celebrations being held due to a national holiday. As the commander of the provincial police and Gendarmerie forces, the Governor can also take decisions designed to limit civil disobedience and preserve public order. Although mayors of municipalities and councillors are elected during local elections, the Governor has the right to re-organise or to inspect the proceedings of local government despite being an unelected position.

== List of governors of Diyarbakır ==
- Mithat Bey (1923–1925)
- Rüştü Efendi (1925)
- Cemal Bardakçı (1925–1926)
- Rüştü Efendi (1926)
- Ali Rıza Ceylan (1926–1927)
- Nazmi Toker (Vekil, 1927)
- Nizamettin Bey (1927–1931)
- Hasan Faiz Ergun (1931–1937)
- İbrahim Sabri Çıtak (1937–1939)
- Recai Güreli (1939–1942)
- Feyyaz Bosut (1942–1944)
- Akil Aksu (1944–1945)
- Kazım Akdoğan (1945–1947)
- A. Abdullah Feyzi Gürel (1947–1950)
- Necati İlter (1950–1952)
- Kemal Hadımlı (1952–1954)
- Cemal Babaç (1954–1955)
- İhsan Sabri Çağlayangil (1955)
- Şakir Canalp (1955–1957)
- Şevket Özenalp (1957–1958)
- Niyazi Toker (1958–1959)
- Muhlis Babaoğlu (1959–1960)
- Hadi Ömür (1960–1961)
- Sait Koçak (1961–1962)
- Namık Kemal Şentürk (1962–1965)
- Ali Rıza Yaradanakul (1965–1968)
- Mustafa Yörükoğlu (1968–1971)
- Sabahattin Çakmakoğlu (1971–1975)
- Mehmet Aldan (1975–1977)
- Fikret Turgut Sayın (1977–1978)
- Nedim Evliya (1978–1979)
- Yılmaz Ergun (1979–1980)
- Kenan Güven (1980–1984)
- Rıdvan Yenişen (1984–1988)
- Doğan Ünlüsoy (1988–1991)
- Temel Koçaklar (1991–1992)
- İbrahim Şahin (1992–1994)
- Kutlu Aktaş (1994–1995)
- Mehmet Karasarlıoğlu (1995–1997)
- Nafiz Kayalı (1997–1999)
- Ahmet Cemil Serhadlı (1999–2003)
- Nusret Miroğlu (2003–2006)
- Efkan Ala (2006–2007)
- Hüseyin Avni Mutlu (2007–2010)
- Mustafa Toprak (2010–2013)
- Mustafa Cahit Kıraç (2013–2014)
- Hüseyin Aksoy (2014–2017)
- Hasan Basri Güzeloğlu (2017–2020)
- Münir Karaloğlu (2020–2022)
- Ali İhsan Su (2022–2024)
- Murat Zorluoğlu (2024–2026)
- Selçuk Aslan (2026–)

== See also ==
- Governor (Turkey)
- Diyarbakır Province
- Ministry of the Interior (Turkey)
