= Tillo =

Municipality in Siirt Province, Turkey

- Municipality
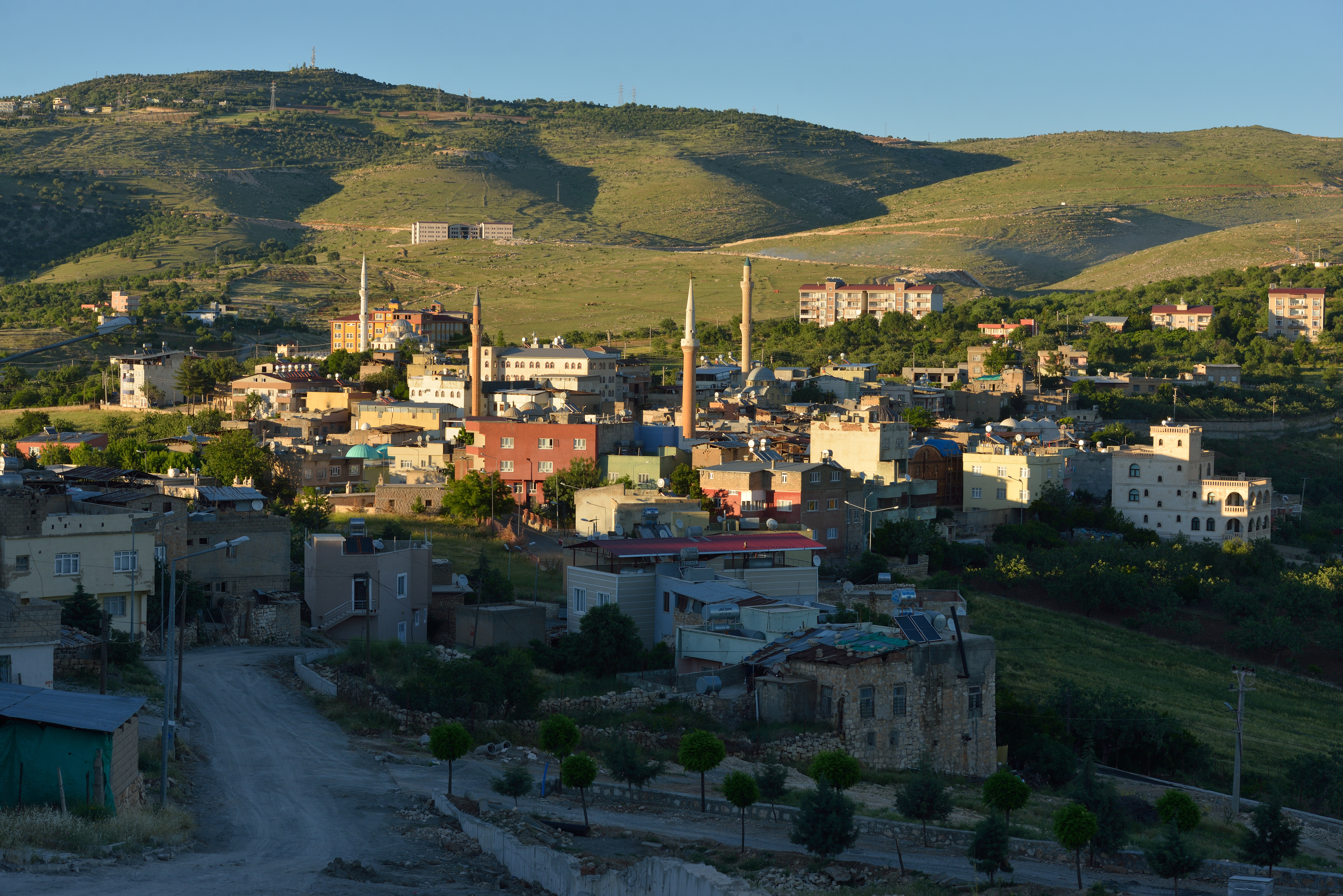
- View of Tillo

- Location within Turkey
- Coordinates: 37°57′03″N 42°00′48″E
- Country: Turkey
- Province: Siirt
- District: Tillo
- Population (2022): 2,022
- Time zone: UTC+3 (TRT)
- Website: tillo.bel.tr

Tillo or Aydınlar (Arabic: تل, Kurdish: Tîlo) is a town in the Tillo District of Siirt Province in Turkey. Its population is 2,022 (2022). The town is inhabited by Arabs and Kurds.

== Etymology ==
The name of the town is derived from the Arabic: تل, romanized: tell, lit. 'hill'.

== Neighborhoods ==
Tillo is divided into the neighborhoods of Fakirullah, Mücahit and Saydanlar.

== Demographics ==
The Arabs of the town belong to the tribes of Xālidiyya and Abbāsiyya who claim to have migrated to Tillo from Homs and Saudi Arabia about 700 and 400 years ago, respectively. Both tribes adhere to Shafi'i Islam and assumingly settled in the region as missionaries. The Kurds were followers of Ismail Faqirullah and Şeyh İbrahim El Mücahit and settled in Tillo as they wished to serve them there.

Linguistically, the Arab population, more or less, all speak Kurdish beside Arabic, while few Kurds know Arabic.

In recent decades, the Arab population has decreased to due migration to Istanbul, while the Kurdish population has steadily grown due to migration by Kurdish tribes from surrounding areas with the Arab population still forming a majority.

== Population ==
Historic population figures of the town:

Historical population
| Year | Pop. | ±% |
|---|---|---|
| 1965 | 2,953 | — |
| 1970 | 2,507 | −15.1% |
| 1980 | 2,267 | −9.6% |
| 1990 | 2,789 | +23.0% |
| 2000 | 2,981 | +6.9% |
| 2010 | 1,885 | −36.8% |
| 2020 | 2,219 | +17.7% |
| 2022 | 2,022 | −8.9% |

== Gallery ==
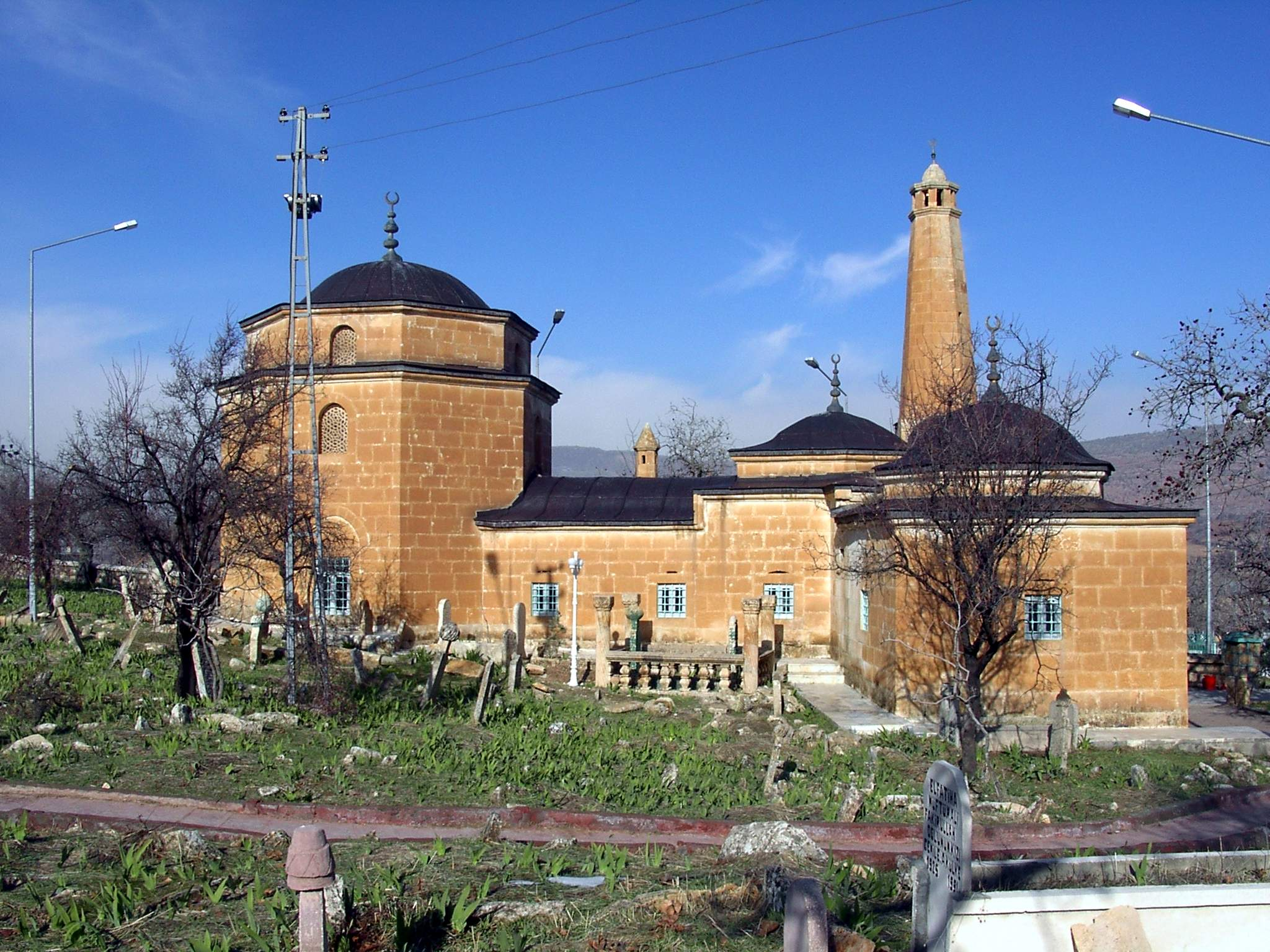
İbrahim Hakkı Erzurumi shrine in Tillo, Siirt

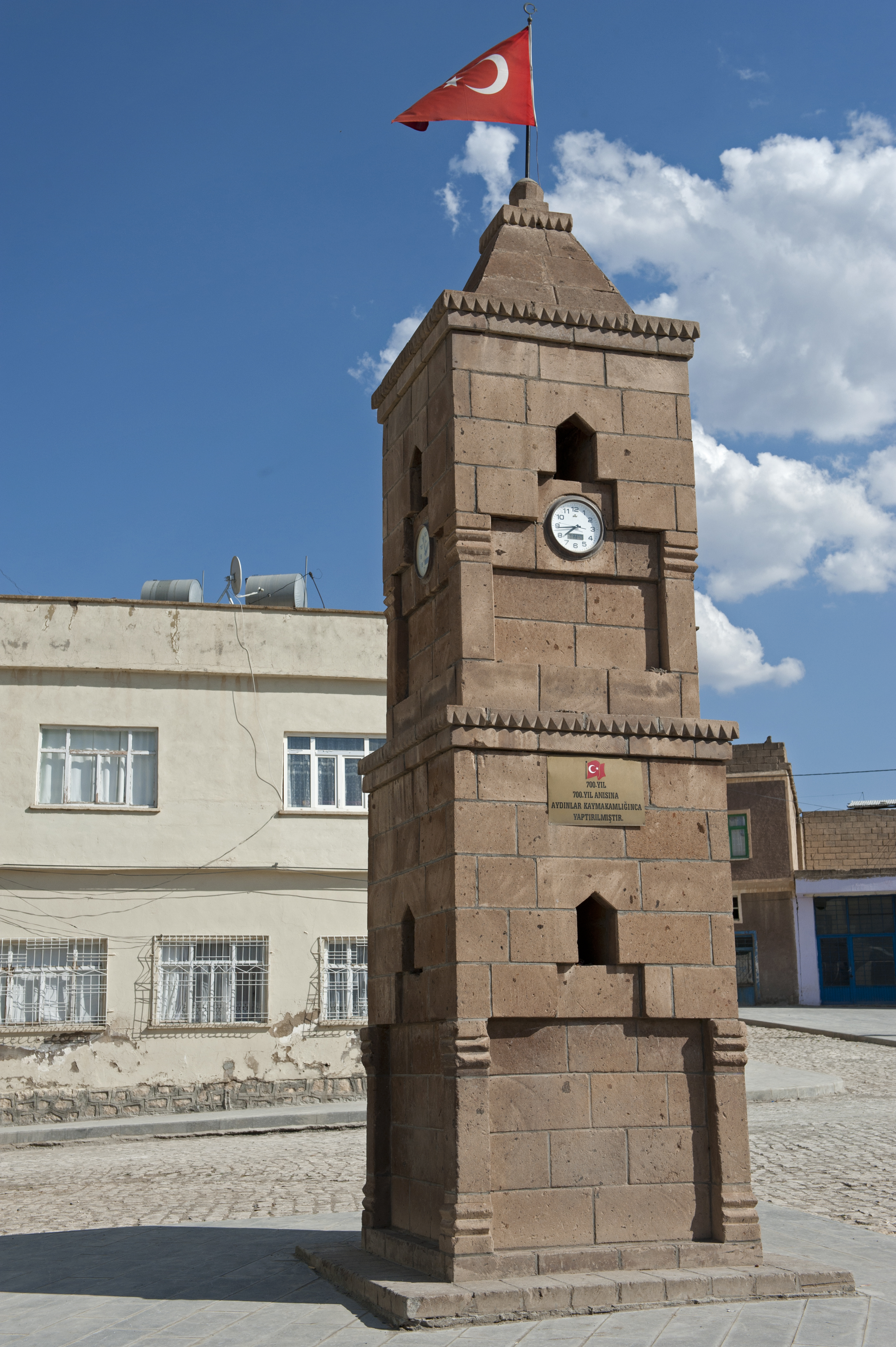
Tillo Clocktower

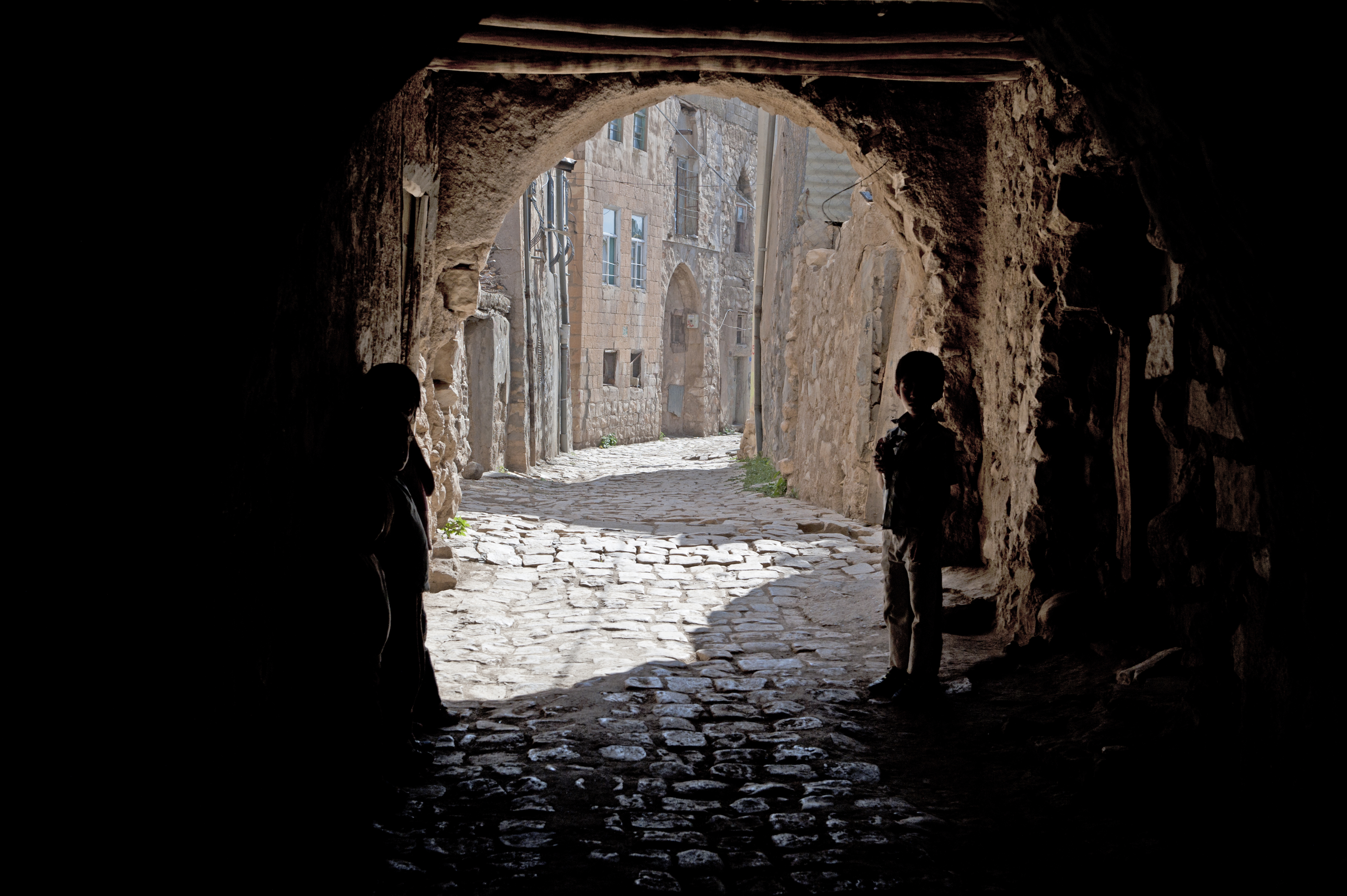
Tillo Cobbled Street

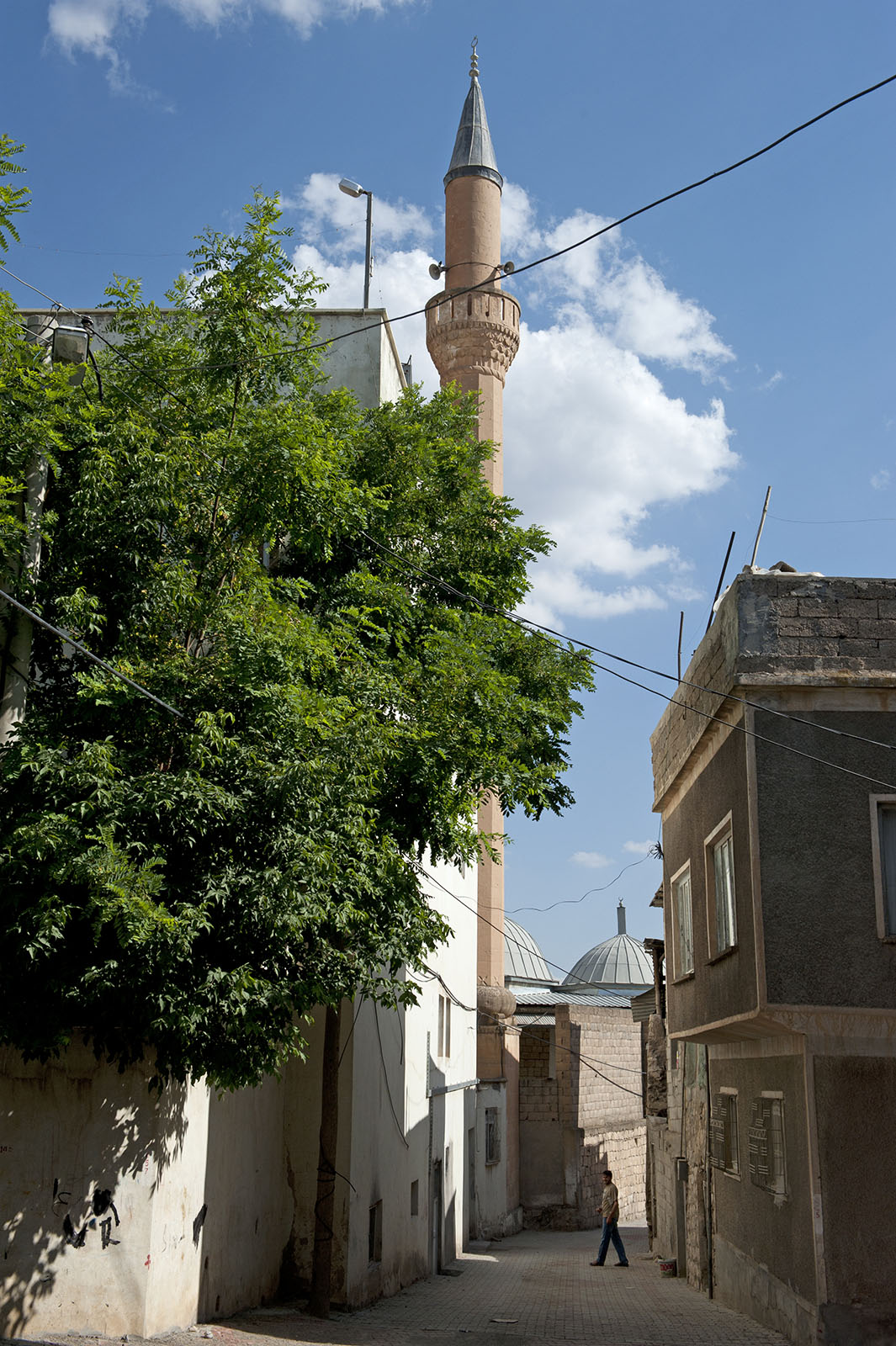
Tillo Street scene

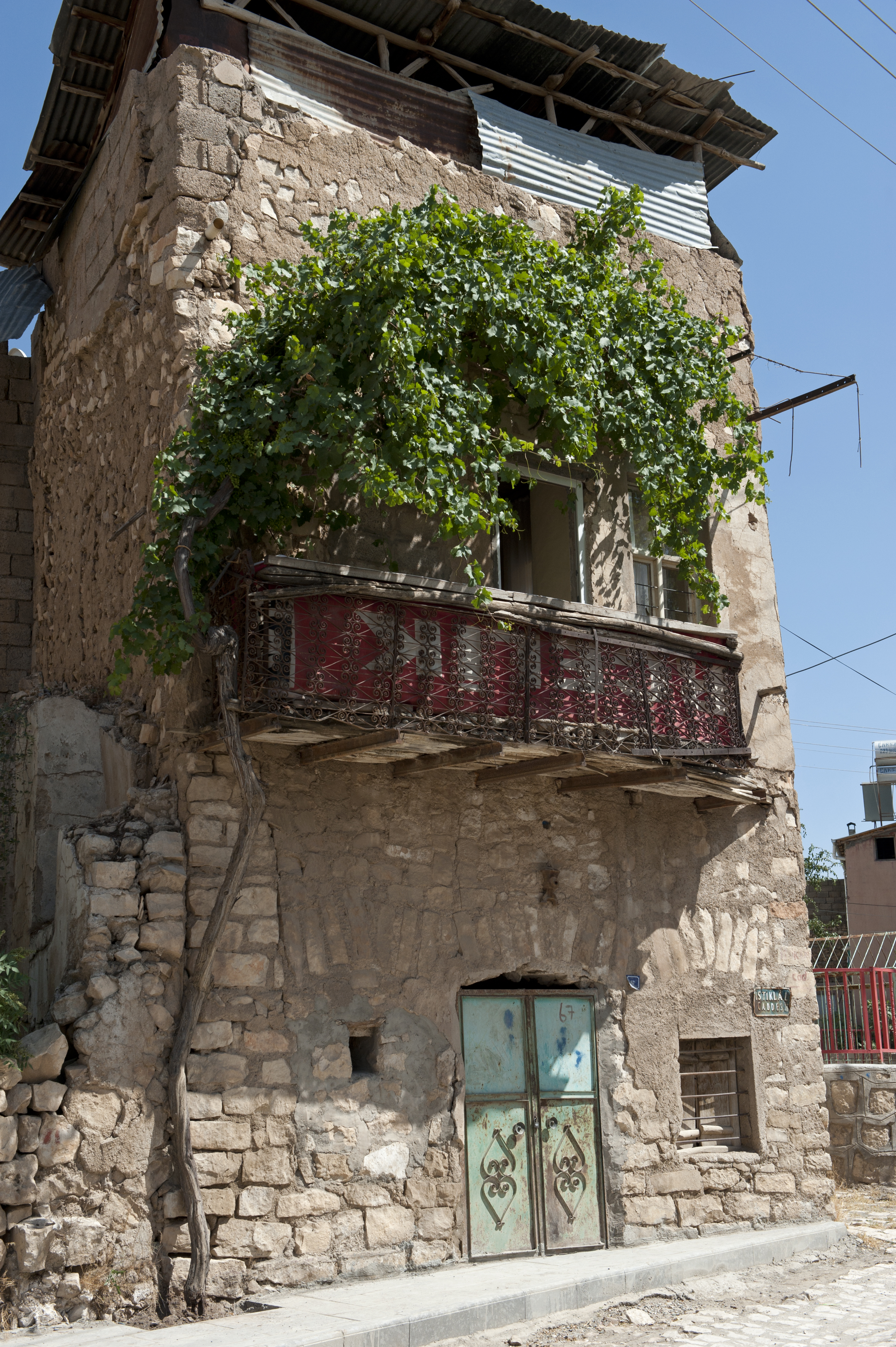
Tillo Old house

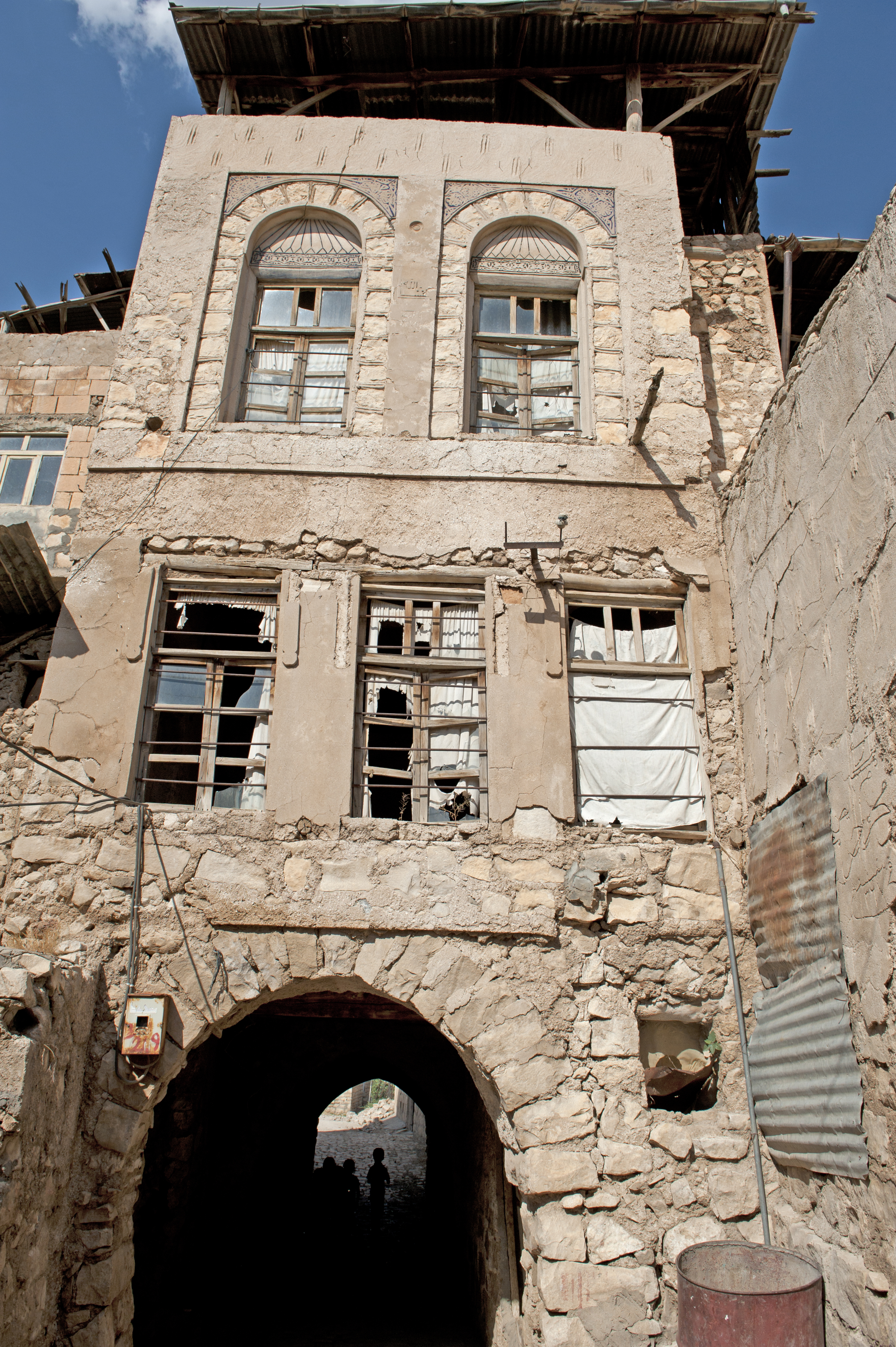
Tillo Old house

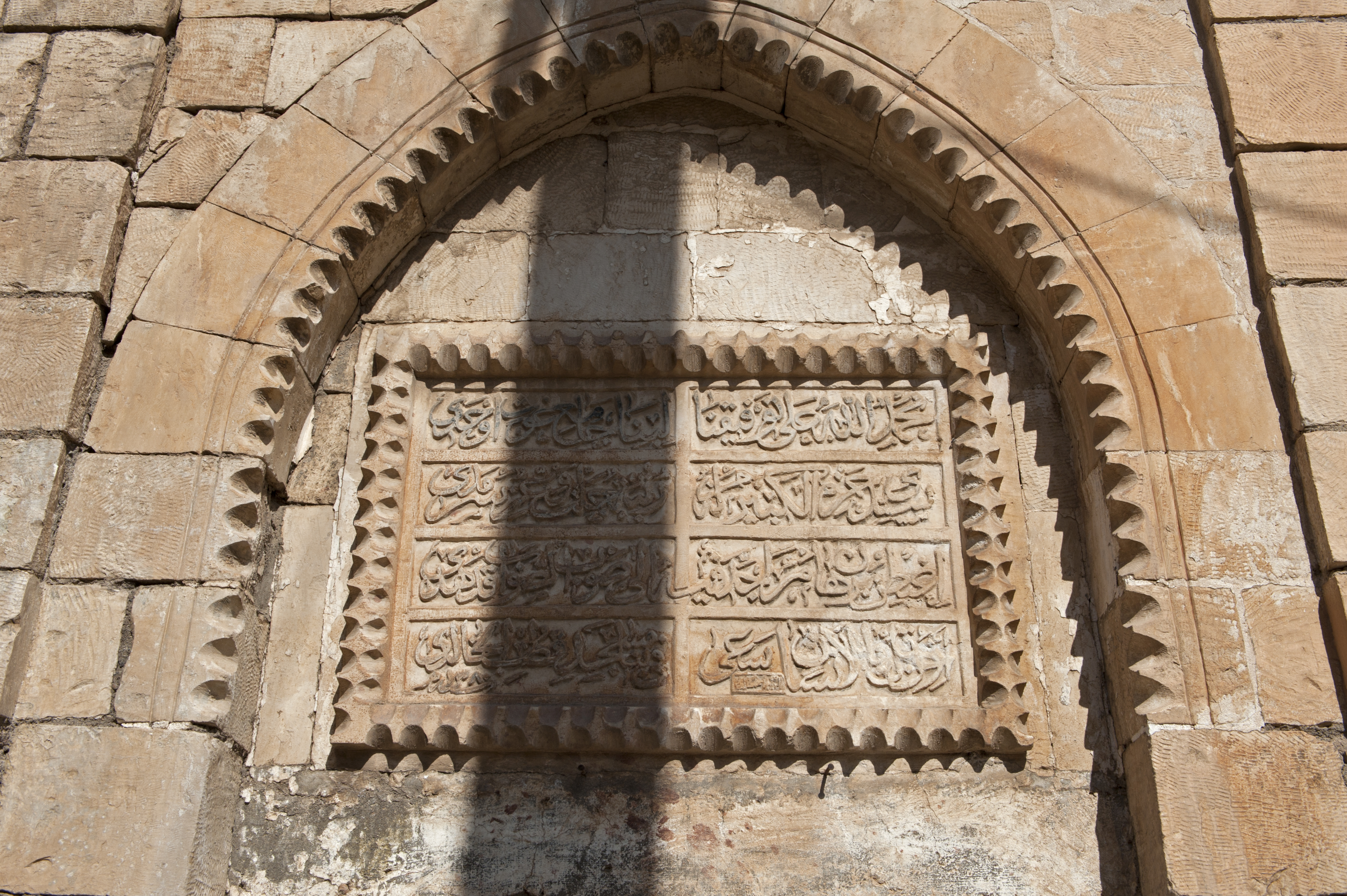
Tillo Old house detail

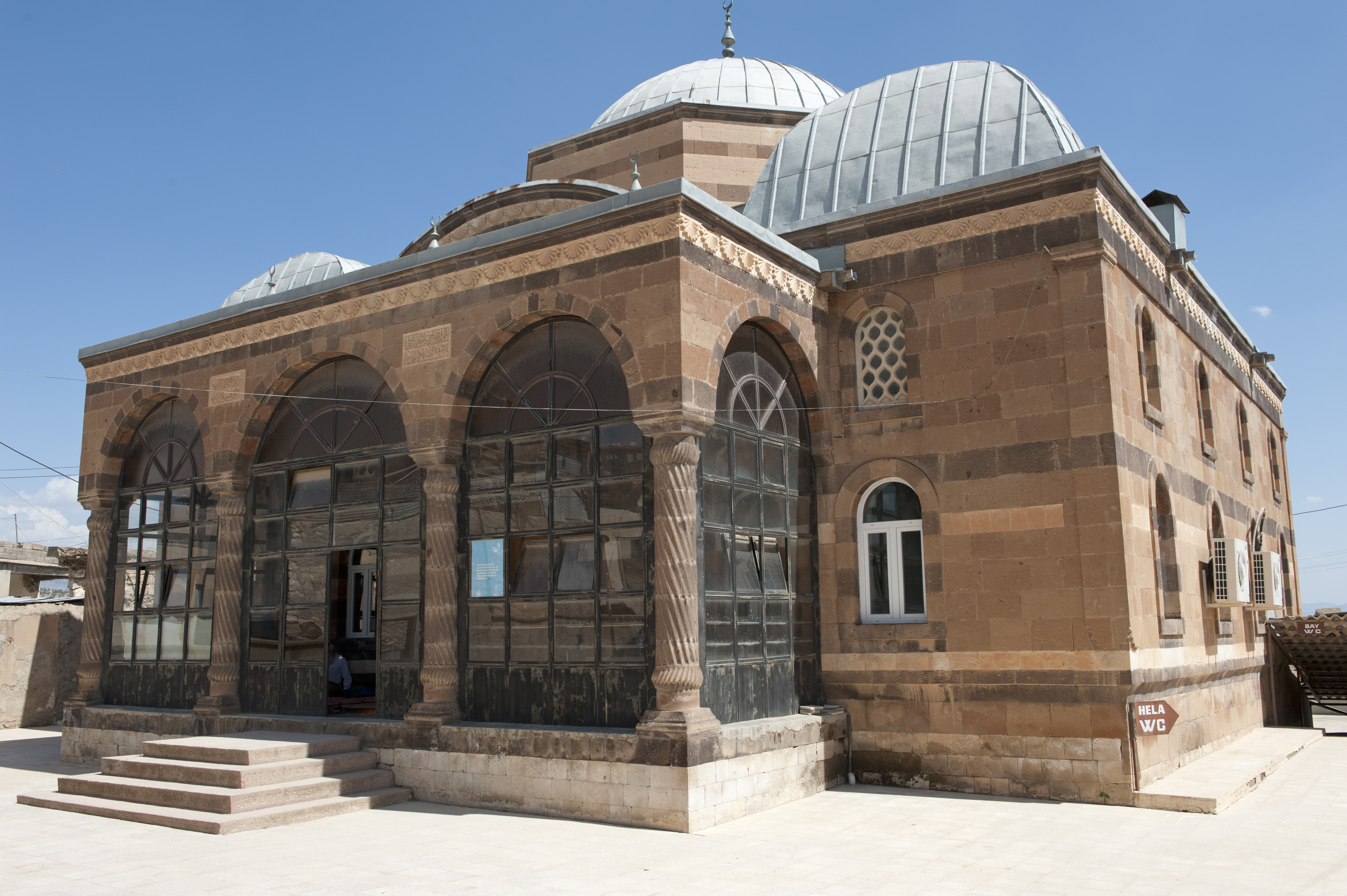
Tillo Restored mosque

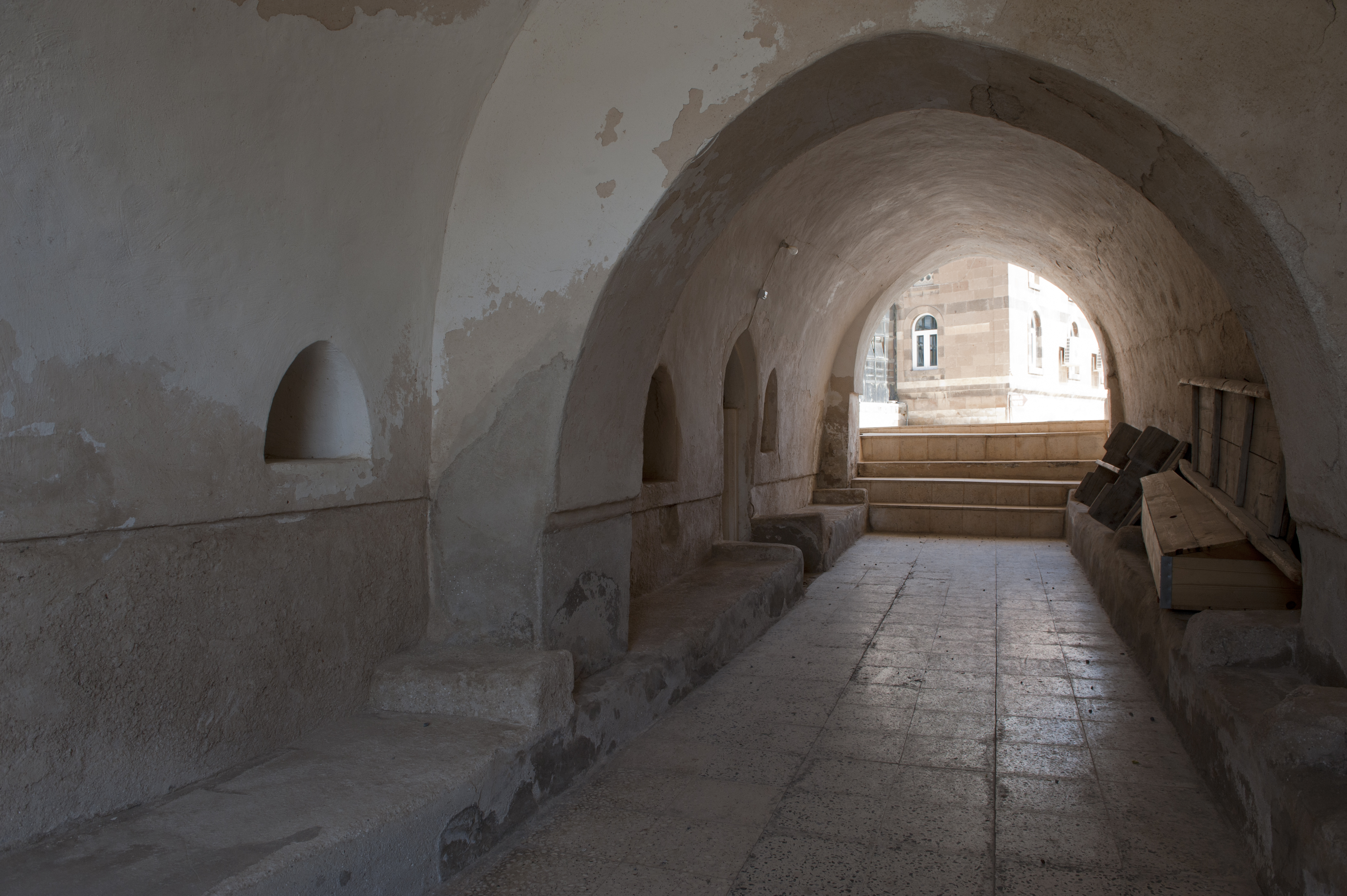
Tillo Restored mosque entrance

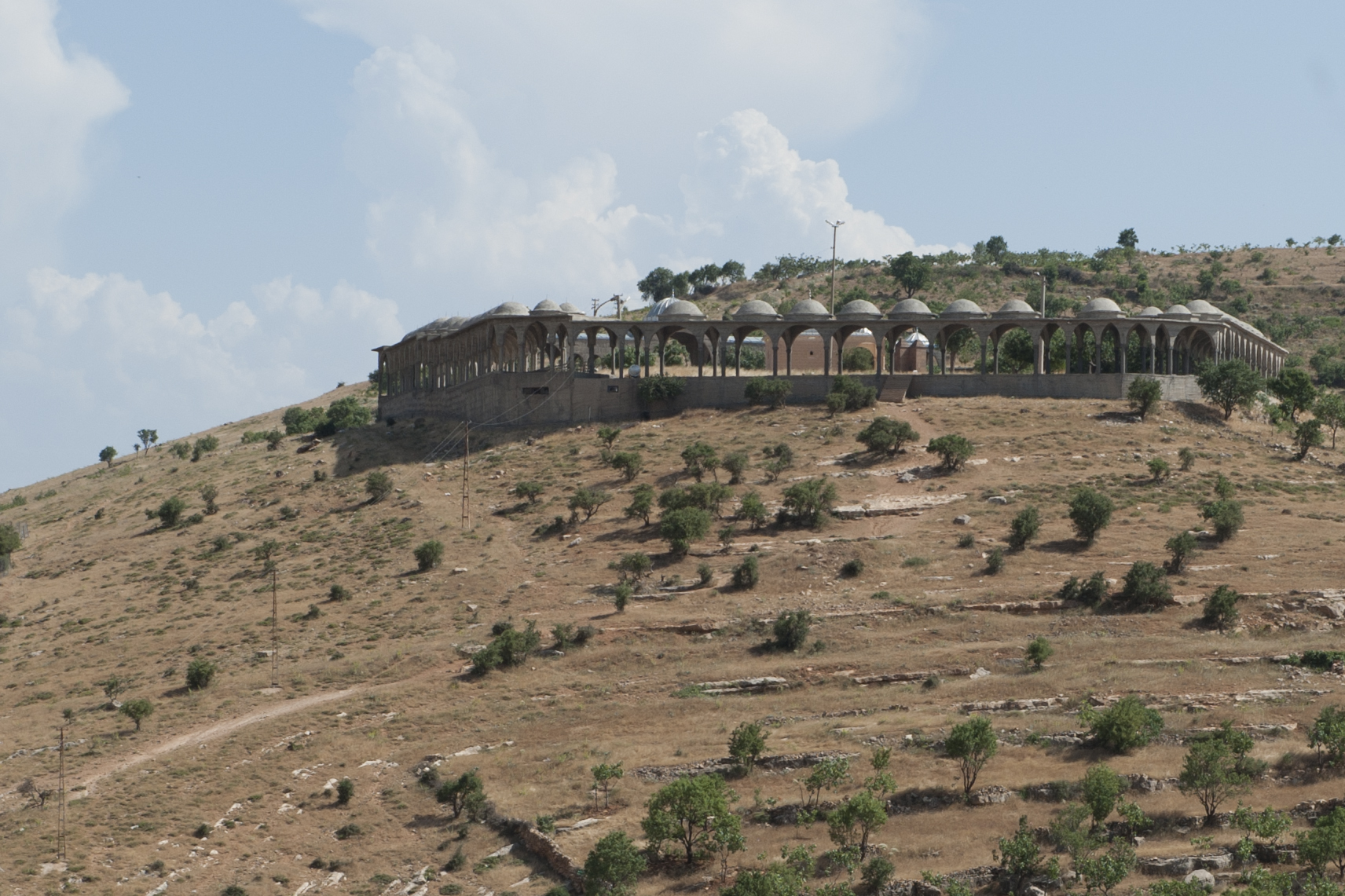
Tillo Unidentified monument

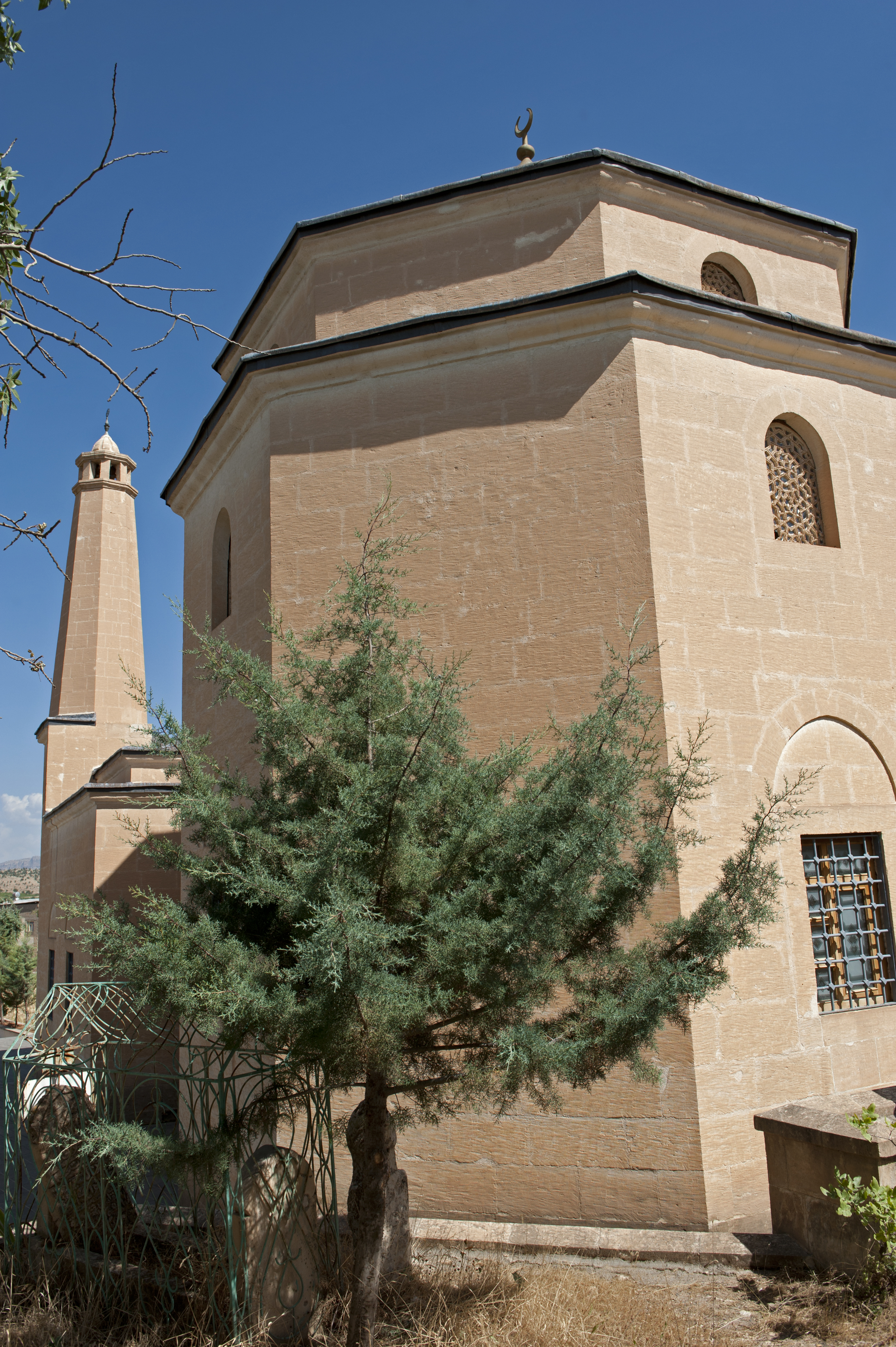
Tillo Mausoleum Ismail Fakirullah and Ibrahim Hakki

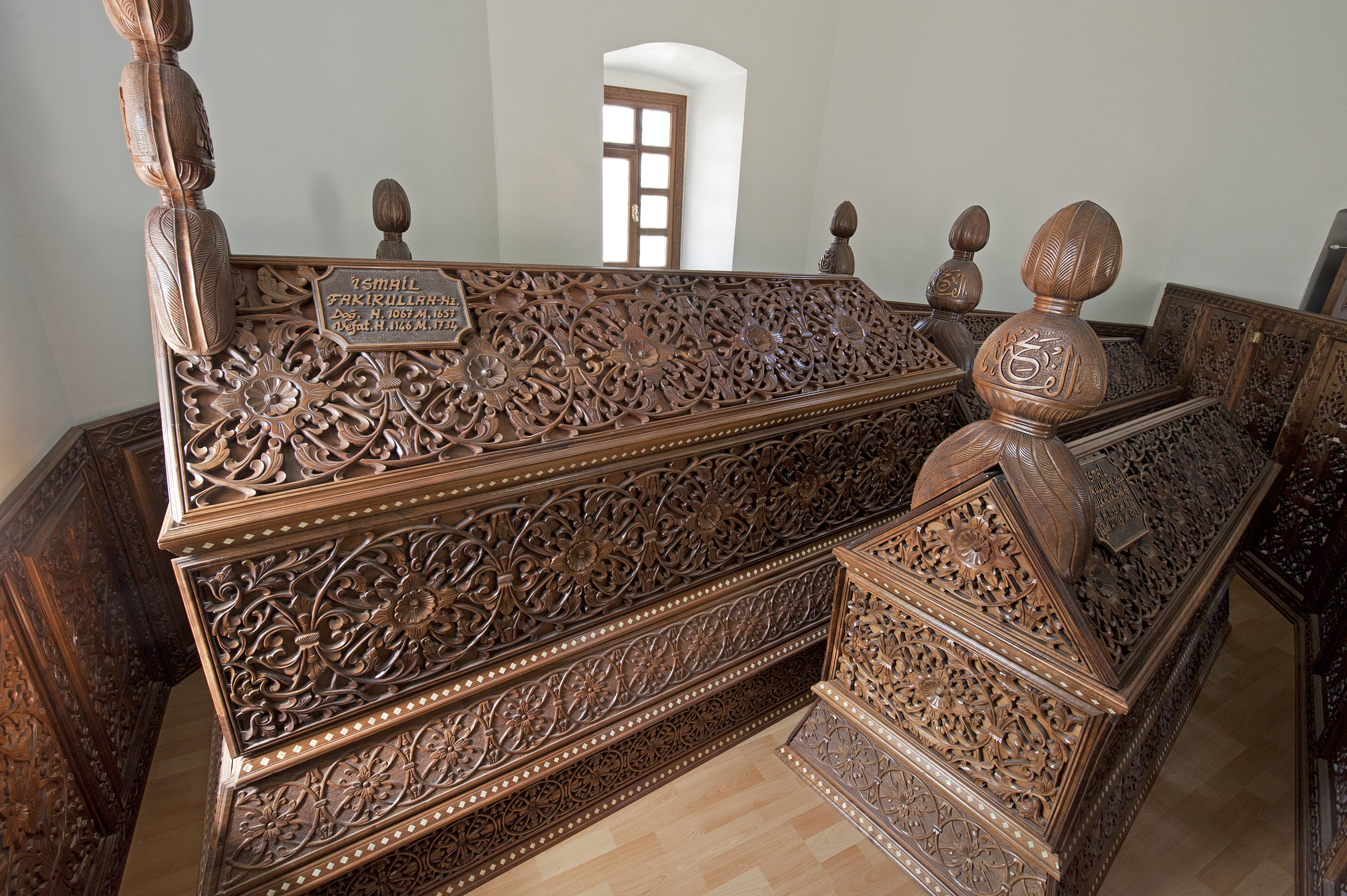
Tillo Mausoleum Ismail Fakirullah and Ibrahim Hakki

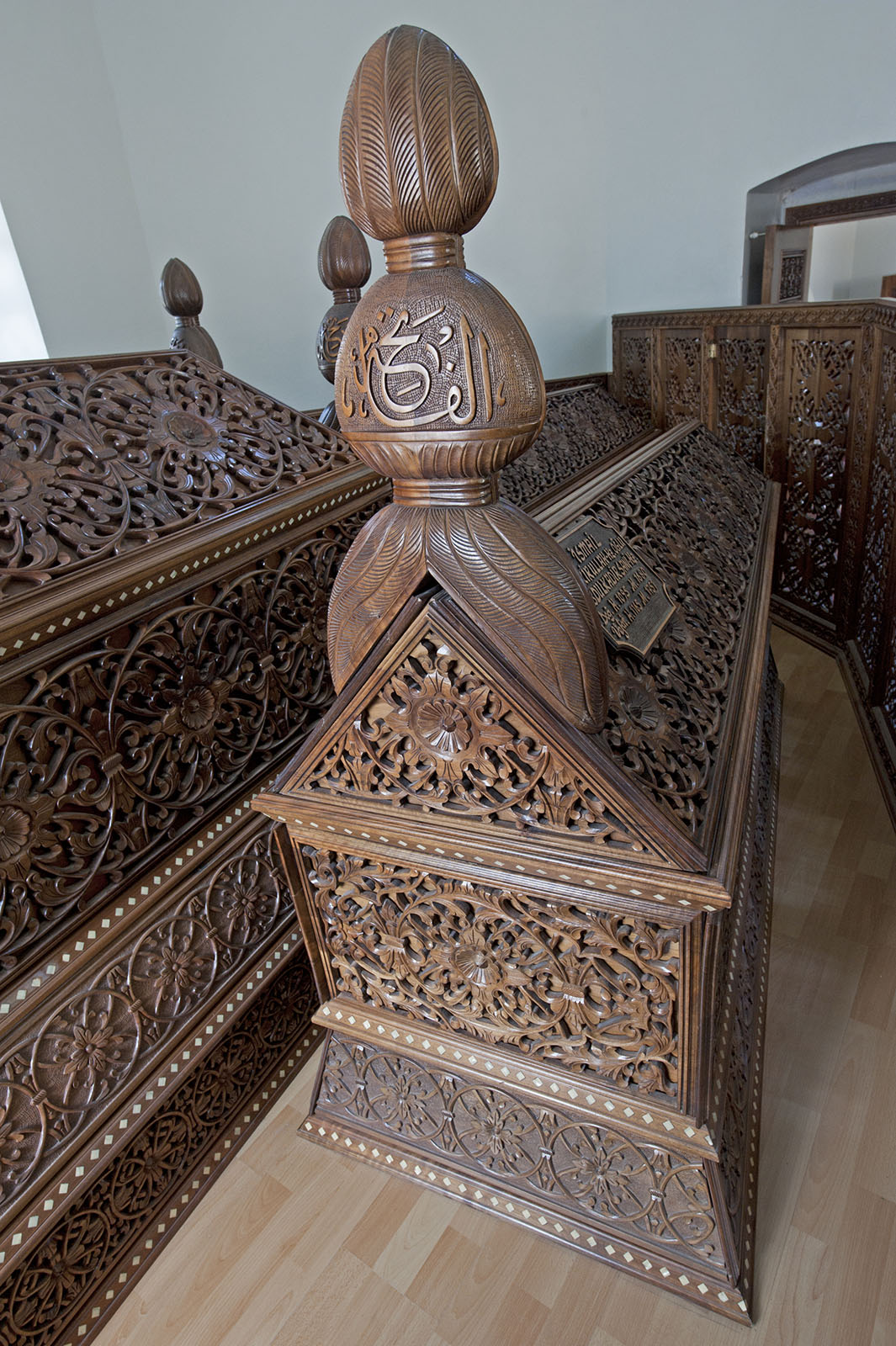
Tillo Mausoleum Ismail Fakirullah and Ibrahim Hakki

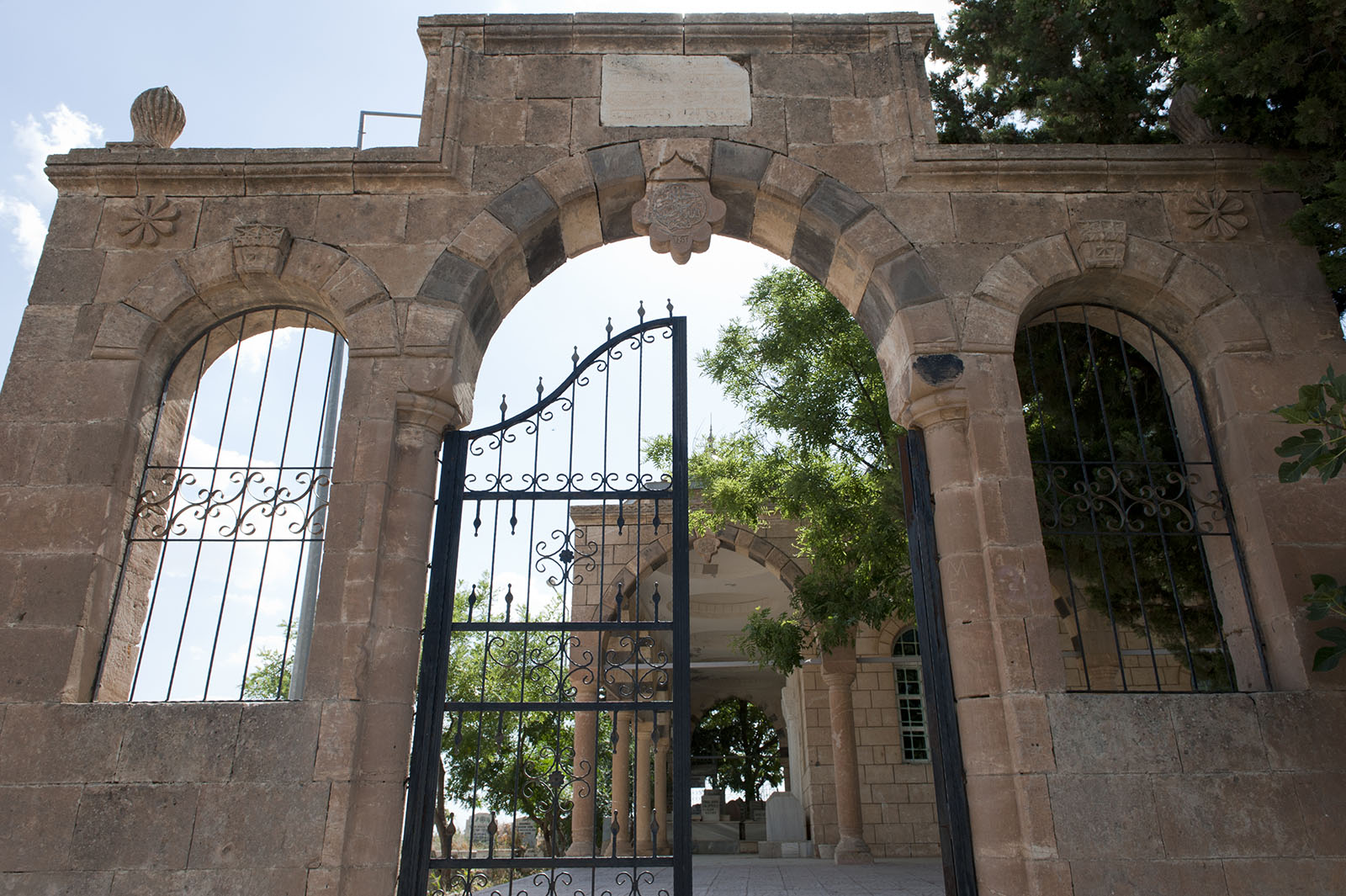
Tillo mausoleum of Gavsul Memduh

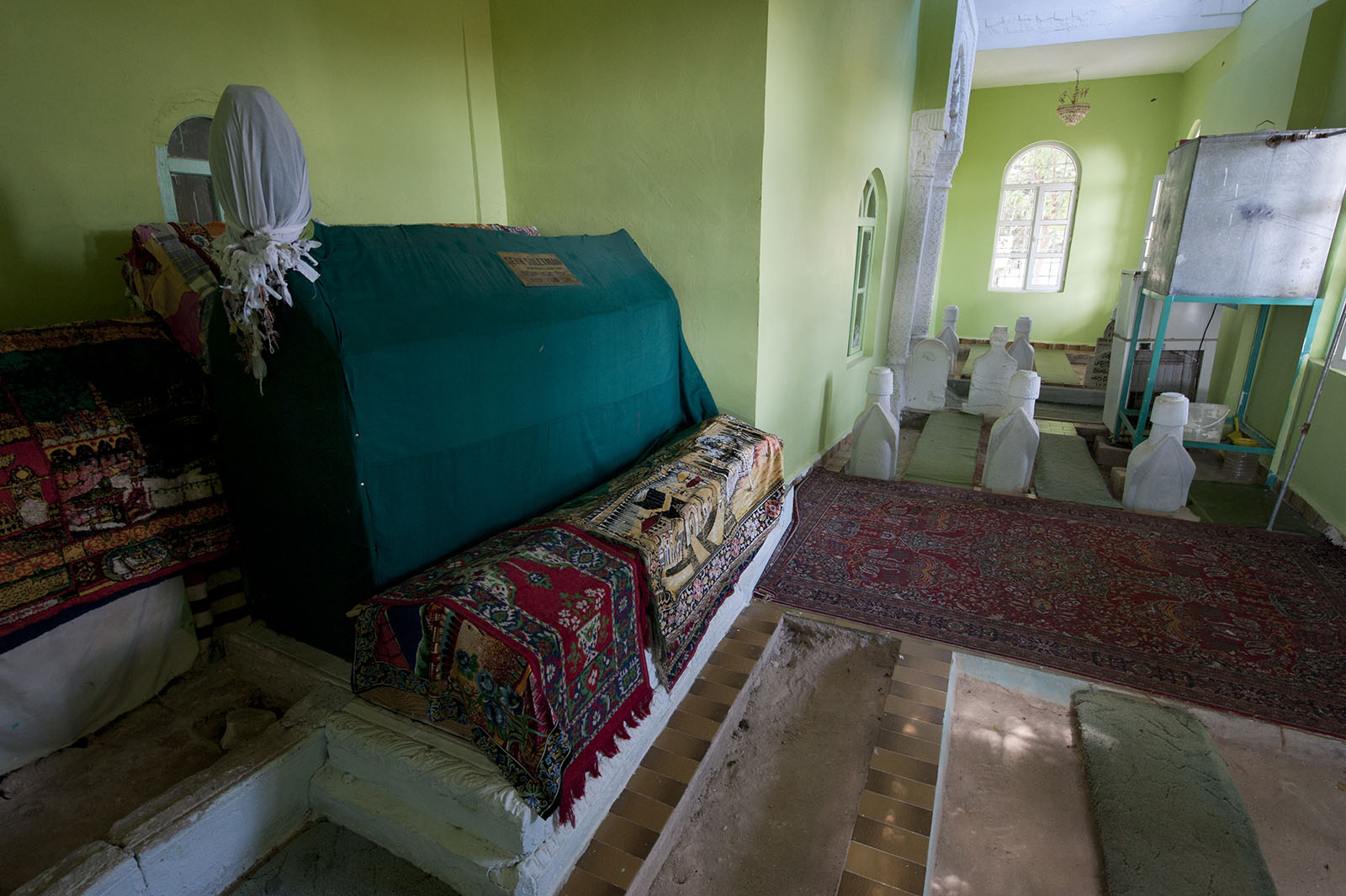
Tillo mausoleum of Gavsul Memduh

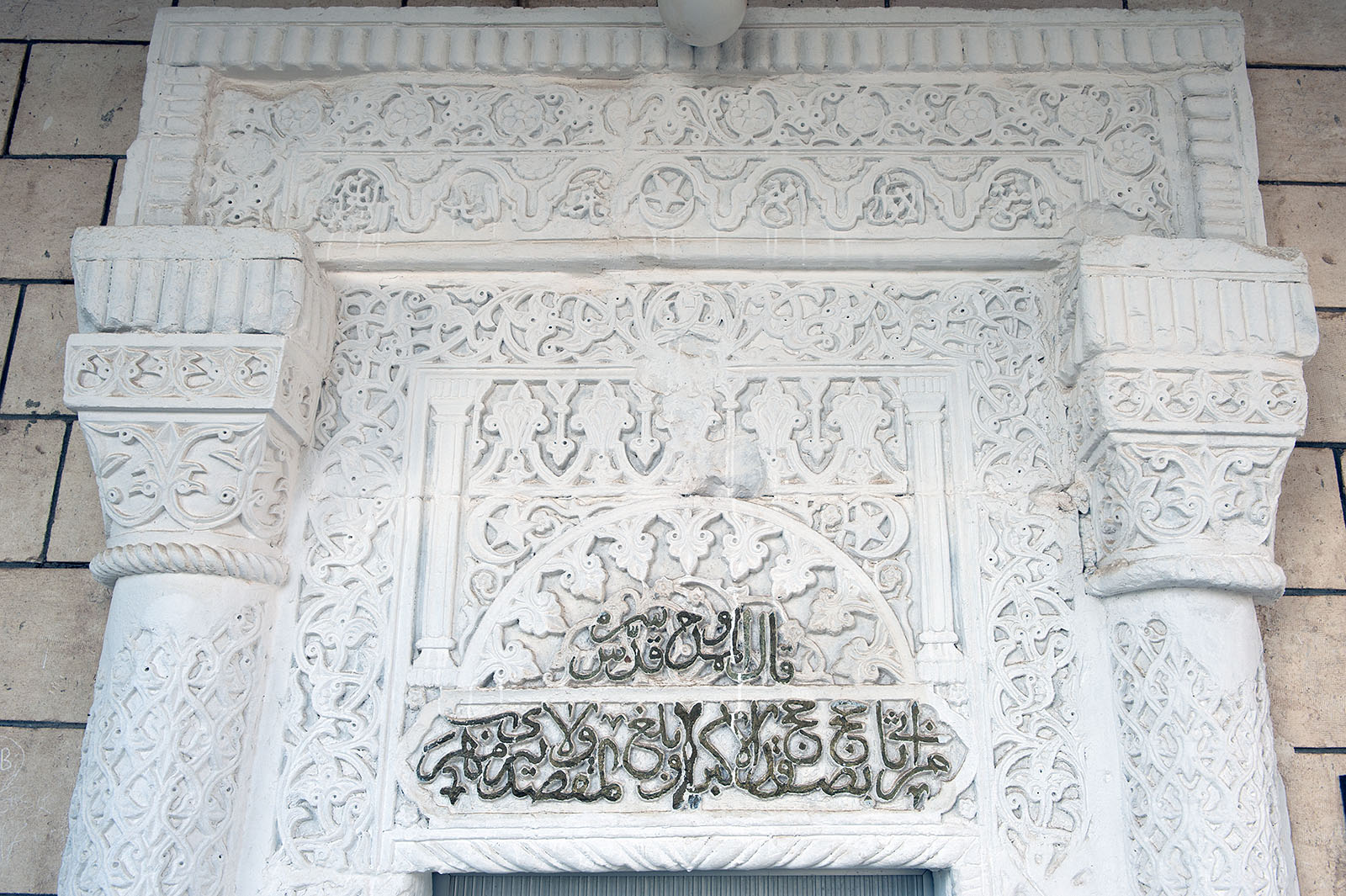
Tillo mausoleum of Gavsul Memduh

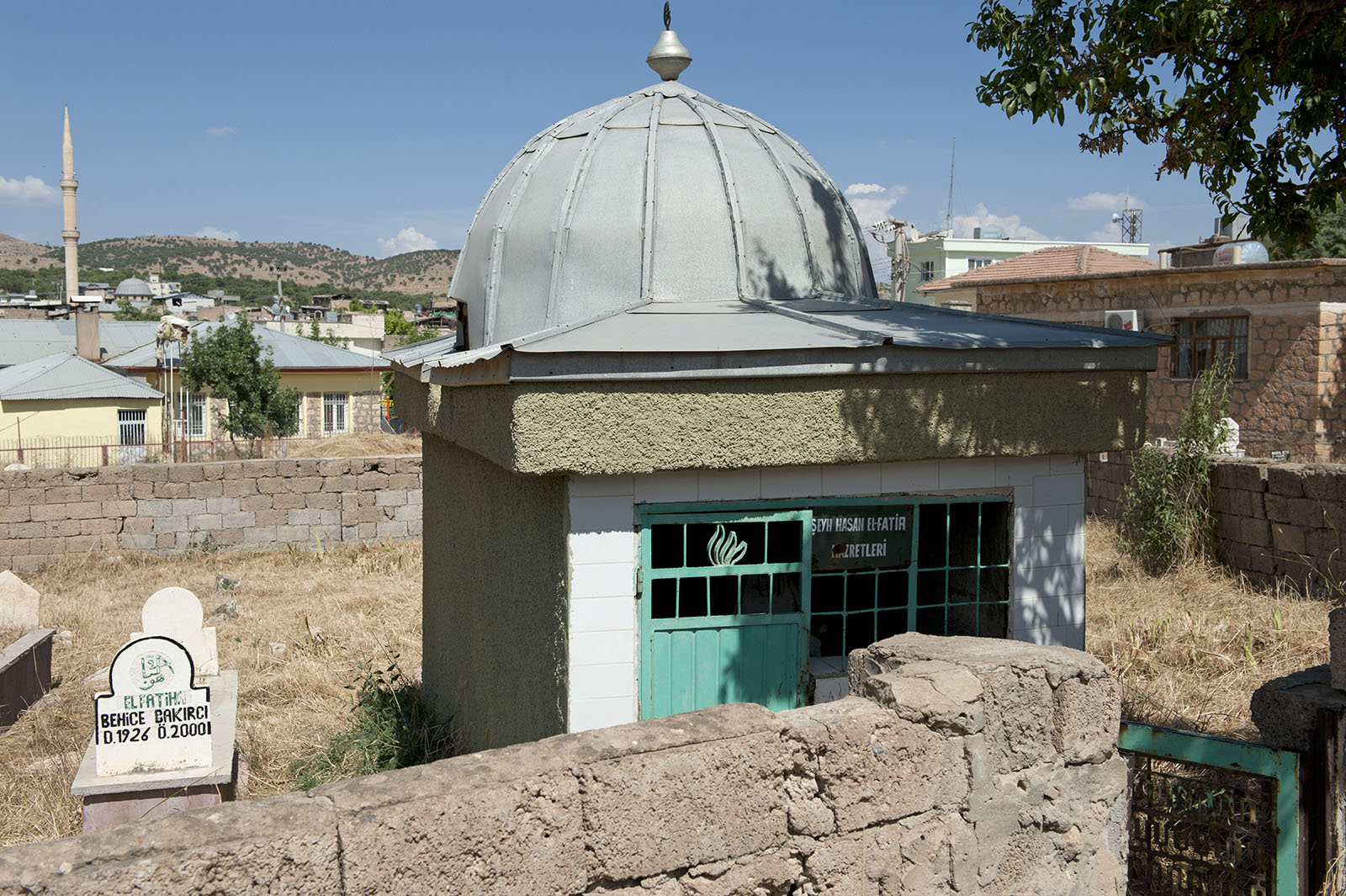
Tillo Mausoleum of Sheyh Hasan El-Fatir

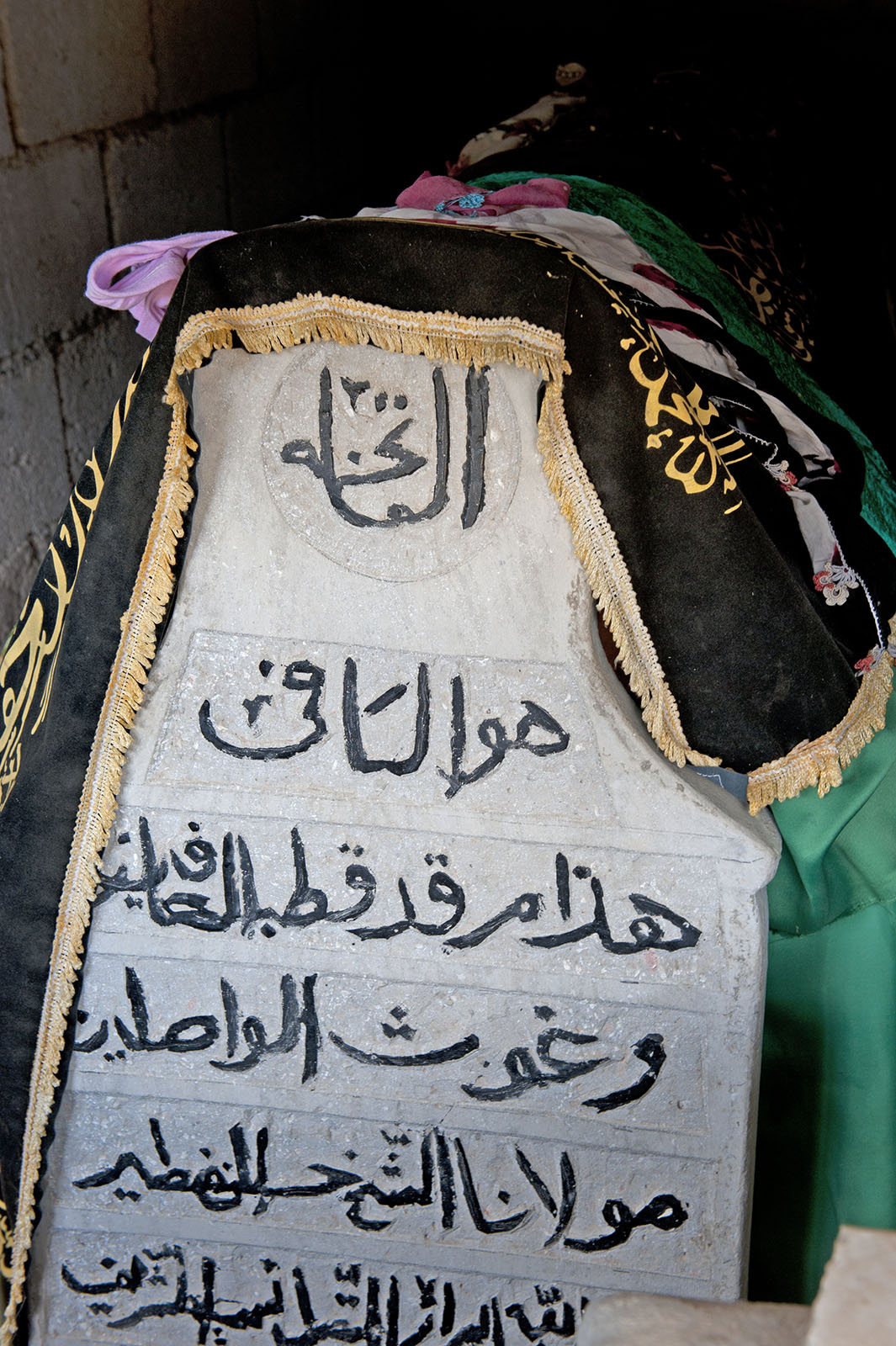
Tillo Mausoleum of Sheyh Hasan El-Fatir

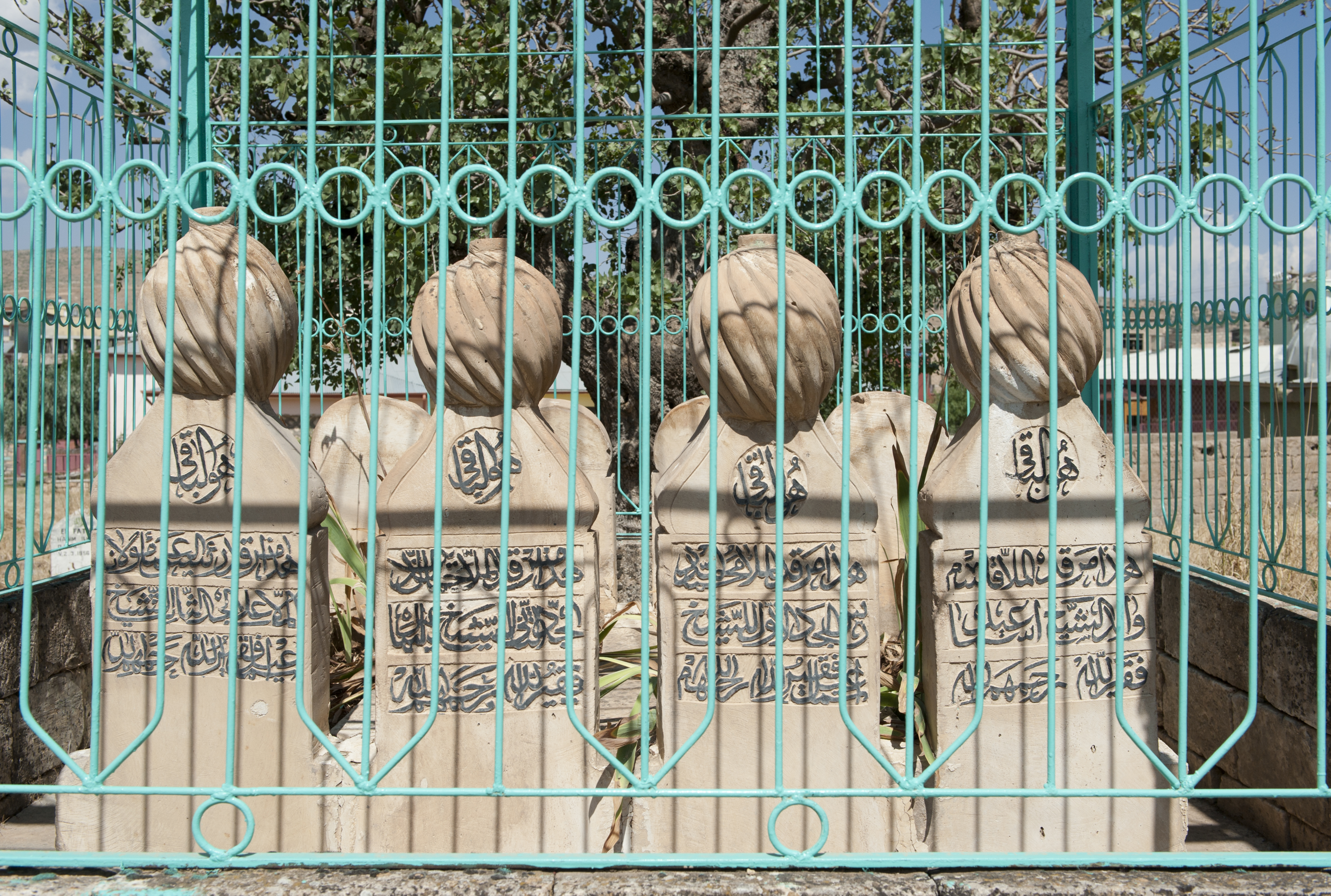
Tillo Four Mollas grave
