= Gaziantep bombing =

Gaziantep bombing may refer to:

- 2012 Gaziantep bombing
- May 2016 Gaziantep bombing
- August 2016 Gaziantep bombing
