= Siirt Province =

Province of Turkey

Coordinates: 37°55′48″N 42°16′13″E

- Province
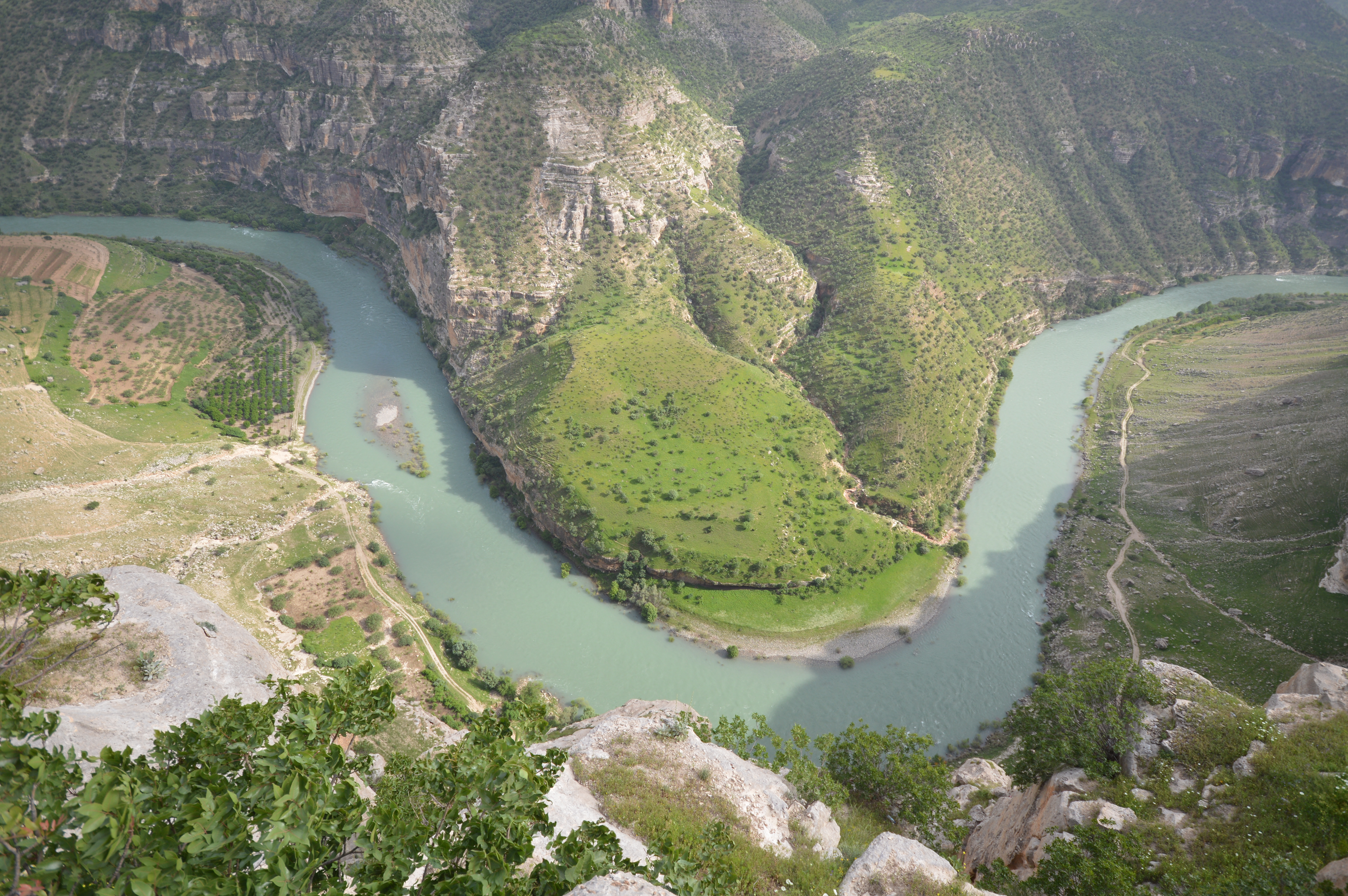
- Botan Valley National Park

- Location of Siirt Province in Turkey
- Country: Turkey
- Seat: Siirt

Government
  - Governor: Kemal Kızılkaya
- Area: 5,717 km^{2} (2,207 sq mi)
- Population (2022): 331,311
  - Density: 57.95/km^{2} (150.1/sq mi)
- Time zone: UTC+3 (TRT)
- Area code: 0484
- Website: www.siirt.gov.tr

Siirt Province, (Turkish: Siirt ili, Kurdish: Parêzgeha Sêrtê; is a province of Turkey, located in the southeast. The province borders Bitlis to the north, Batman to the west, Mardin to the southwest, Şırnak to the south, and Van to the east. Its area is 5,717 km^{2}, and its population is 331,311 (2022). Its capital is Siirt. It encompasses 12 municipalities, 280 villages and 214 hamlets.

The province is considered part of Turkish Kurdistan and has a Kurdish majority. The current Governor of the Siirt province is Kemal Kızılkaya.

== History ==
In order to Turkify the Kurds of Siirt, Law 1164 was passed in June 1927, which allowed the creation of Inspectorates-General (Umumi Müffetişlik, UM) that governed with martial law under a state of emergency. The Siirt province was included in the so called First Inspectorate General (Umumi Müfettişlik, UM) in which an Inspector General governed with wide-ranging authority of civilian, juridical and military matters. The UM covered the provinces of Hakkâri, Siirt, Van, Mardin, Bitlis, Sanlıurfa, Elaziğ and Diyarbakır. The Inspectorate Generals were dissolved in 1952 during the government of the Democrat Party. Entrance to Siirt province was forbidden to foreigners until 1965.

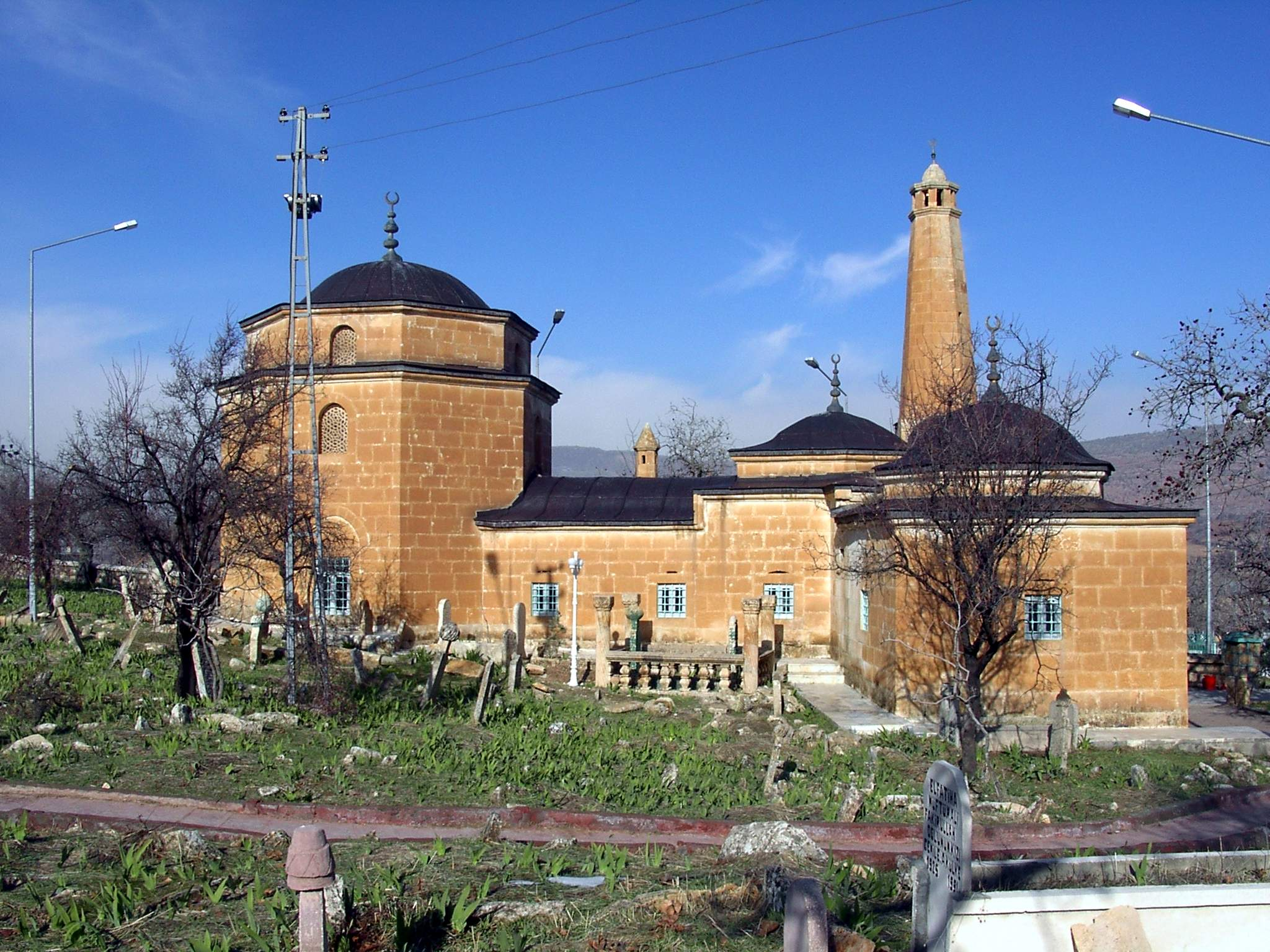
Ibrahim Hakkı shrine, also known as Tomb of İsmail Fakirullah in Tillo, Siirt

In July 1987, the Siirt province was included in to the state of emergency region OHAL, which was declared to counter the Kurdistan Workers' Party (PKK), and governed by a supergovernor who was invested with additional powers than a normal governor, including the power to relocate and resettle whole settlements. In December 1990 with the Decree No. 430, the supergovernor and the provincial governors in the OHAL region received immunity against any legal prosecution in connections with actions they made due to the powers they received from Decree No. 430. In November 1999, the state of emergency under which the province was governed was finally ended.

== Geology and geomorphology ==
There is a national park called Botan valley national park in Siirt province.

== Districts ==
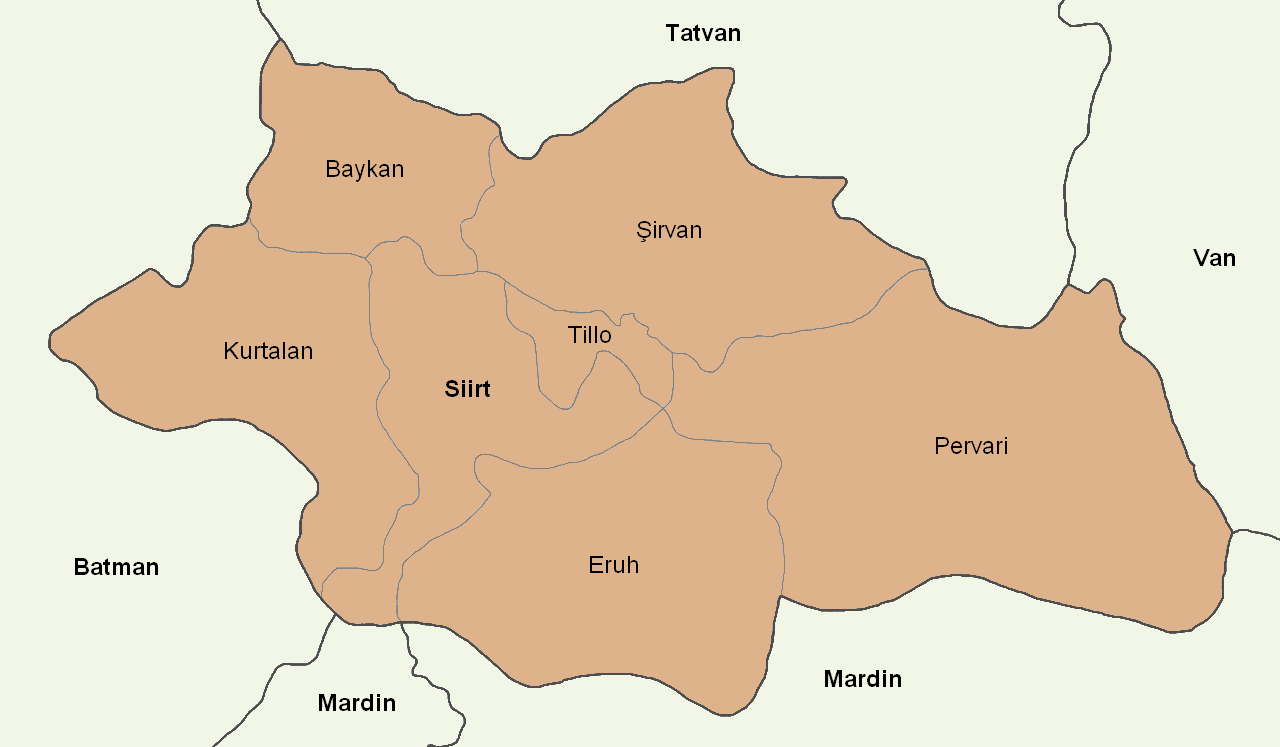
Districts of Siirt Province

Siirt province is divided into 7 districts (capital district in bold):

- Baykan
- Eruh
- Kurtalan
- Pervari
- **Siirt**
- Şirvan
- Tillo
