= Siirt (disambiguation) =

Siirt is a city in Turkey. It may also refer to:

- Siirt (electoral district)
- Siirt Airport
- Siirt Atatürk Stadium
- Siirt District
- Siirt Province
- Siirt University
- Siirt attack, which may refer to either:
  - 2015 Siirt bombing, or
  - 2018 Siirt raid

== See also ==
- Siirtspor
