= 2000–01 Siirt Jetpa Spor season =

Siirt Jetpa Spor
2000–01 season
- Manager: Sakip Özberk (until 20 October); Slobodan Dogandžić (from 6 November until 26 February); Tevfik Lav (from 2 March)
- Stadium: Siirt Atatürk Stadium
- 1.Lig: 16th (relegated)
- Turkish Cup: Third round
- Top goalscorer: League: Ceyhun Eriş (11); All: Ceyhun Eriş (11)

The 2000–01 season was Siirt Jetpa Spor's 33rd season in existence and the club's third consecutive season in the top flight of Turkish football. In addition to the domestic league, Siirt Jetpa Spor participated in this season's edition of the Turkish Cup. The season covered the period from July 2000 to 30 June 2001.

== Pre-season and friendlies ==
Win Draw Loss

== Competitions ==
=== Overview ===
Competition	First match	Last match	Starting round	Final position	Record							
Competition	First match	Last match	Starting round	Final position	Pld	W	D	L	GF	GA	GD	Win %
1.Lig	12 August 2000	26 May 2001	Matchday 1	17th	34	6	6	22	47	81	−34	17.65
Turkish Cup	25 October 2000	29 November 2001	Second round	Third round	2	1	0	1	4	7	−3	50.00
Total					36	7	6	23	51	88	−37	19.44

Source: Competitions

=== 1.Lig ===
==== League table ====
Pos	Team	Pld	W	D	L	GF	GA	GD	Pts	Qualification or relegation
14	Bursaspor	34	11	7	16	55	60	−5	40	
15	Antalyaspor	34	9	9	16	45	64	−19	36	
16	Siirt Jet-PA Spor (R)	34	6	6	22	47	81	−34	24	Relegation to Turkish Second League Category A
17	Erzurumspor (R)	34	5	6	23	36	80	−44	21	Relegation to Turkish Second League Category A
18	Adanaspor (R)	34	2	10	22	51	91	−40	16	Relegation to Turkish Second League Category A

Rules for classification: 1) points; 2) goal difference; 3) number of goals scored.
(R) Relegated

==== Results summary ====
Overall								Home						Away					
Pld	W	D	L	GF	GA	GD	Pts	W	D	L	GF	GA	GD	W	D	L	GF	GA	GD
0	0	0	0	0	0	0	0	0	0	0	0	0	0	0	0	0	0	0	0

Source: Flashscore

==== Results by round ====
Round	1	2	3	4	5	6	7	8	9	10	11	12	13	14	15	16	17	18	19	20	21	22	23	24	25	26	27	28	29	30	31	32	33	34
Ground	H	H	H	A	H	A	H	A	H	A	H	A	H	A	H	H	A	A	A	A	H	A	H	A	H	A	H	A	H	A	H	A	A	H
Result	L	L	D	L	D	L	L	L	D	L	L	D	L	L	D	D	L	W	L	W	L	L	L	W	L	L	L	L	W	L	W	W	L	L
Position	12	14	14	15	16	16	17	17	17	17	18	18	18	18	18	18	18	18	18	18	18	18	18	17	18	18	18	18	17	17	16	16	16	16

A = Away; H = Home; W = Win; D = Draw; L = Loss

==== Matches ====
13 August 2000 1	Siirt Jetpa Spor	1–2	Antalyaspor	Siirt
17:00				Stadium: Siirt Atatürk Stadium

19 August 2000 2	Siirt Jetpa Spor	2–3	Çaykur Rizespor	Siirt
17:00				Stadium: Siirt Atatürk Stadium

26 August 2000 3	Siirt Jetpa Spor	2–2	Adanaspor	Siirt
17:00				Stadium: Siirt Atatürk Stadium

10 September 2000 4	Fenerbahçe	4–2	Siirt Jetpa Spor	Istanbul
19:07

17 September 2000 5	Siirt Jetpa Spor	1–1	MKE Ankaragücü	Siirt
15:30				Stadium: Siirt Atatürk Stadium

23 September 2000 6	Gaziantepspor	4–0	Siirt Jetpa Spor	Gaziantep
19:00

1 October 2000 7	Siirt Jetpa Spor	1–4	Trabzonspor	Siirt
14:00				Stadium: Siirt Atatürk Stadium

14 October 2000 8	Galatasaray	4–1	Siirt Jetpa Spor	Istanbul
19:00				Stadium: Ali Sami Yen Stadium

21 October 2000 9	Siirt Jetpa Spor	1–1	Erzurumspor	Siirt
14:00				Stadium: Siirt Atatürk Stadium

28 October 2000 10	Bursaspor	3–2	Siirt Jetpa Spor	Bursa
14:00				Stadium: Bursa Atatürk Stadium

5 November 2000 11	Siirt Jetpa Spor	1–2	Samsunspor	Siirt
13:00				Stadium: Siirt Atatürk Stadium

12 November 2000 12	Kocaelispor	1–1	Siirt Jetpa Spor	İzmit
14:00				Stadium: İzmit İsmetpaşa Stadium

18 November 2000 13	Siirt Jetpa Spor	0–2	İstanbulspor	Siirt
13:00				Stadium: Siirt Atatürk Stadium

26 November 2000 14	Gençlerbirliği	2–0	Siirt Jetpa Spor	Ankara
13:30

3 December 2000 15	Siirt Jetpa Spor	1–1	Denizlispor	Siirt
13:00				Stadium: Siirt Atatürk Stadium

10 December 2000 16	Siirt Jetpa Spor	1–1	Beşiktaş	Siirt
13:00				Stadium: Siirt Atatürk Stadium

16 December 2000 17	Yimpaş Yozgatspor	2–1	Siirt Jetpa Spor	Yozgat
13:30

23 December 2000 18	Antalyaspor	1–3	Siirt Jetpa Spor	Antalya
14:00

3 February 2001 19	Çaykur Rizespor	3–0	Siirt Jetpa Spor	Rize
13:30

10 February 2001 20	Adanaspor	0–2	Siirt Jetpa Spor	Adana
13:30

17 February 2001 21	Siirt Jetpa Spor	0–4	Fenerbahçe	Siirt
14:00				Stadium: Siirt Atatürk Stadium

24 February 2001 22	MKE Ankaragücü	4–1	Siirt Jetpa Spor	Ankara
13:30

3 March 2001 23	Siirt Jetpa Spor	1–2	Gaziantepspor	Siirt
14:00				Stadium: Siirt Atatürk Stadium

11 March 2001 24	Trabzonspor	2–4	Siirt Jetpa Spor	Trabzon
14:00

18 March 2001 25	Siirt Jetpa Spor	0–1	Galatasaray	Siirt
17:00				Stadium: Siirt Atatürk Stadium

31 March 2001 26	Erzurumspor	2–1	Siirt Jetpa Spor	Erzurum
15:00

8 April 2001 27	Siirt Jetpa Spor	2–5	Bursaspor	Siirt
15:00				Stadium: Siirt Atatürk Stadium

14 April 2001 28	Samsunspor	4–3	Siirt Jetpa Spor	Samsun
15:00

22 April 2001 29	Siirt Jetpa Spor	4–3	Kocaelispor	Siirt
15:00				Stadium: Siirt Atatürk Stadium

28 April 2001 30	İstanbulspor	2–1	Siirt Jetpa Spor	Istanbul
16:30

6 May 2001 31	Siirt Jetpa Spor	3–0	Gençlerbirliği	Siirt
14:30				Stadium: Siirt Atatürk Stadium

12 May 2001 32	Denizlispor	1–2	Siirt Jetpa Spor	Denizli
19:00

19 May 2001 33	Beşiktaş	5–1	Siirt Jetpa Spor	Istanbul
19:00

26 May 2001 34	Siirt Jetpa Spor	1–3	Yimpaş Yozgatspor	Siirt
14:30				Stadium: Siirt Atatürk Stadium

=== Turkish Cup ===
25 October 2000 Second round	Cizrespor	0–1	Siirt Jetpa Spor	Cizre
				Stadium: [[]]

29 November 2000 Third round	Fenerbahçe	7–3	Siirt Jetpa Spor	Istanbul
				Stadium: Şükrü Saracoğlu Stadium
