= List of herbaria in Turkey =

The following is a list of herbaria in Turkey. Herbaria are established within faculties and institutes of credible universities. Those created in departments that are concerned with natural sciences such as botany, ecology, biogeography and climatology are mostly used to do research on the genetics of the plants, to examine their distribution on specific geographical locations and to protect them for future generations, while those affiliated with more practice-based departments such as pharmacy are used as a resource for drug production techniques.

The first herbarium in Turkey was opened in 1933 within the Faculty of Science at Ankara University. Founded by Kurt Krause and Hikmet Birand, this herbarium is the oldest among its counterparts in the country and has the most number of species within its 200,000-piece collection. Therefore, it is also called Herbarium Turcicum (Turkish Herbarium). The Sugar Institute Herbarium, Atatürk University Faculty of Science Herbarium and Ege University Faculty of Pharmacy Herbarium are closed to visitors and scientific researchers. However, thanks to a specially created website, it is possible to access all the data related to the Ege University Faculty of Pharmacy Herbarium remotely. Altınbaş University Faculty of Pharmacy Herbarium, which opened in 2018, is the first herbarium to be established by a private university. In addition, Anadolu, Ankara, Ege, Marmara, Onsekiz Mart and Siirt universities have two herbaria each, while Hacettepe, Istanbul and Yüzüncü Yıl universities have three herbaria each. As of 2020, there are 55 herbaria in 34 different provinces of Turkey.

== Naming and abbreviation ==
To create a herbarium, it is necessary to do a serious research, using archiving and preservation techniques. Although herbaria are usually established within universities' science and pharmacy faculties, institutions such as botanical gardens or natural history museums can also create their own collections. However, aside from preserving them for scientific studies and keeping records of them, it is important to share them with the universal scientific community. Therefore, information tags are assigned to recorded plant samples and the abbreviation of the herbarium within which they are stored is also included. The names and abbreviations of official herbaria are recorded in an international data system called Index Herbariorum, which has been in operation since 1935. While assigning international codes, the name of the city where the herbarium is located is taken into consideration, as well as the name of the institution to which it is affiliated. Herbarium abbreviations are always written in capital letters, consist of at least one and at most eight letters, and no period is added.

Thanks to this system, all herbaria that are active in the world only have a descriptive code of their own and the collections they host are transferred to a common information pool. The system, managed by the International Association for Plant Taxonomy between 1952 and 1974, has been operated by the New York Botanical Garden since 1974. As of 2020, approximately 3,100 herbaria from various countries of the world and more than 390 million samples in total were recorded in this system.

== List ==
Name	No. Specimens	Code	Affiliated institution	Location	Opening (Note: The years specified in the "Opening" column are indicated on the basis of the year in which the relevant herbarium received the international herbarium code. The date in question does not refer to the year in which the herbarium was actually or officially established, but the year in which it was scientifically registered in the international arena.)	Status
Kırıkkale University Faculty of Arts and Sciences Herbarium	1,000	ADO	Kırıkkale University	Kırıkkale	2000	Active
Ankara University Faculty of Pharmacy Herbarium	25,000	AEF	Ankara University	Ankara	1978	Active
Abant Izzet Baysal University Herbarium	14,300	AIBU	Abant Izzet Baysal University	Bolu	1994	Active
Aksaray University Herbarium	5,000	AKSU	Aksaray University	Aksaray	2006	Active
Anadolu University Faculty of Science Herbarium	19,525	ANES	Anadolu University	Eskişehir	1994	Active
Ankara University Faculty of Science Herbarium	200,000	ANK	Ankara University	Ankara	1933	Active
Central Anatolia Forestry Research Institute Herbarium	5,830	ANKO	General Directorate of Forestry	Ankara	1959	Active
Artvin Çoruh University Herbarium	30,000	ARTH	Çoruh University	Artvin	2013	Active
Atatürk University Faculty of Science Herbarium	3,000	ATA	Atatürk University	Erzurum	1969	Closed
Adnan Menderes University Botanical Garden and Herbarium Application and Research Center	10,120	AYDN	Adnan Menderes University	Aydın	1998	Active
British Institute at Ankara Herbarium	6,000	BIA	British Institute at Ankara	Ankara	1970	Active
Uludağ University Faculty of Arts and Sciences Herbarium	55,000	BULU	Uludağ University	Bursa	1984	Active
Çanakkale Botanical Garden Herbarium	25,000	CBB	Onsekiz Mart University	Çanakkale	2015	Active
Çanakkale Onsekiz Mart University Herbarium	5,468	CNH	Onsekiz Mart University	Çanakkale	1999	Unknown
Çukurova University Faculty of Pharmacy Herbarium	2,000	CUEF	Çukurova University	Adana	2015	Active
Cumhuriyet University Herbarium	25,000	CUFH	Cumhuriyet University	Sivas	1983	Active
Dicle Universitesi Herbarium	4,804	DUF	Dicle University	Diyarbakır	1974	Active
Düzce University Forestry Faculty Herbarium	5,400	DUOF	Düzce University	Düzce	2009	Active
Dumlupınar University Herbarium	11,000	DUP	Dumlupınar University	Kütahya	1992	Active
Trakya University Faculty of Arts and Sciences Herbarium	5,790	EDTU	Trakya University	Edirne	1983	Active
Ege University Faculty of Science Herbarium	35,000	EGE	Ege University	İzmir	1964	Active
Erciyes University Herbarium	7,308	ERCH	Erciyes University	Kayseri	1996	Active
Sugar Institute Herbarium	725	ESK	Ankara Sugar Factory	Ankara	1956	Closed
Anadolu University Herbarium	13,983	ESSE	Anadolu University	Eskişehir	1979	Active
Fırat University Faculty of Science Herbarium	6,750	FUH	Fırat University	Elazığ	1987	Active
Gazi University Herbarium	30,929	GAZI	Gazi University	Ankara	1985	Active
Gaziosmanpaşa University Herbarium	8,300	GOPU	Gaziosmanpaşa University	Tokat	Unknown	Active
Gül Herbarium	25,000	GUL	Süleyman Demirel University	Isparta	2009	Aktif
Harran University Herbarium	7,000	HARRAN	Harran University	Şanlıurfa	2017	Active
Hacettepe University Biodiversity; Advanced Research Center Herbarium	5,000	HBH	Hacettepe University BIOM	Ankara	2008	Active
Altınbaş University Faculty of Pharmacy Herbarium	500	HERA	Altınbaş University	Istanbul	2018	Active
Hacettepe University Herbarium	42,000	HUB	Hacettepe University	Ankara	1977	Active
Hacettepe University Faculty of Pharmacy Herbarium	6,000	HUEF	Hacettepe University	Ankara	1975	Active
İnönü University Herbarium	8,000	INU	İnönü University	Malatya	2008	Active
Istanbul University Faculty of Pharmacy Herbarium	90,000	ISTE	Istanbul University	Istanbul	1956	Active
Istanbul University Faculty of Science Herbarium	40,000	ISTF	Istanbul University	Istanbul	1956	Active
Istanbul University Forestry Faculty Herbarium	41,500	ISTO	Istanbul University	Istanbul	1956	Active
Aegean Agricultural Research Institute Herbarium	21,500	IZ	Aegean Agricultural Research Institute	İzmir	1964	Active
Ege University Faculty of Pharmacy Herbarium	6,051	IZEF	Ege University	İzmir	1990	Closed (Note: Although the Herbarium of the Ege University Faculty of Pharmacy Herbarium, which is coded with IZEF, is actually closed, it continues to exist interactively as all the samples of herbarium have been uploaded to the internet. In this context "IZEF" went down in history as Turkey's first virtual herbarium.)
Karadeniz Technical University Herbarium	23,240	KATO	Karadeniz Technical University	Trabzon	1973	Active
Selçuk University Faculty of Science Herbarium	24,000	KNYA	Selçuk University	Konya	1975	Active
Marmara University Faculty of Pharmacy Herbarium	16,575	MARE	Marmara University	Istanbul	1985	Active
Mersin University Herbarium	7,810	MERA	Mersin University	Mersin	1996	Active
Centre for Implementation and Research of Plant Health Clinic Herbarium	250	MKUBK	Hatay Mustafa Kemal University	Hatay	2020	Active
Marmara University Herbarium	19,984	MUFE	Marmara University	Istanbul	1984	Active
Tekirdağ Namık Kemal University Herbarium	6,000	NAKU	Namık Kemal University	Tekirdağ	2012	Active
Nezahat Gökyiğit Botanical Garden Herbarium	8,500	NGBB	Ali Nihat Gökyiğit Foundation	Istanbul	2010	Active
Ondokuz Mayıs University Herbarium	7,500	OMUB	Ondokuz Mayıs University	Samsun	1985	Active
Pamukkale University Herbarium	5,000	PAMUH	Pamukkale University	Denizli	2008	Active
Siirt University Herbarium	2,000	SIIRT	Siirt University	Siirt	2015	Active
Siirt University Flora and Fauna Center Herbarium	2,000	SUFAF	Siirt University	Siirt	2015	Active
Yüzüncü Yıl University Herbarium	23,500	VANF	Yüzüncü Yıl University	Van	1982	Active
Van Flora Application and Research Center Herbarium	22,996	VHLV	Yüzüncü Yıl University	Van	1982	Active
Yüzüncü Yıl Üniversitesi Faculty of Pharmacy Herbarium	1,200	VPH	Yüzüncü Yıl University	Van	2015	Active
Bülent Ecevit University Bryofit Herbarium	10,500	ZNG	Bülent Ecevit University	Zonguldak	2009	Active

== Map ==
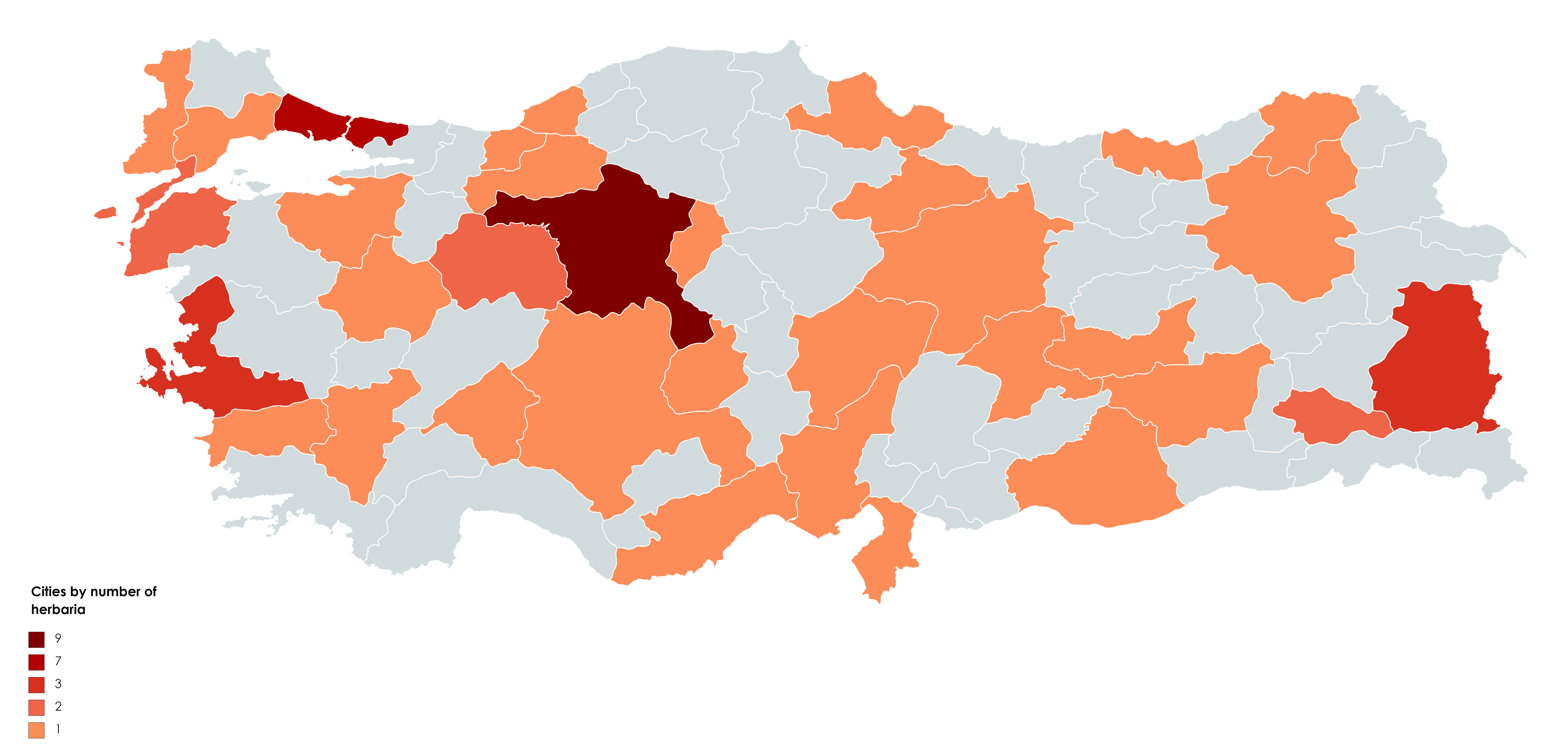
Provinces colored based on the number of herbaria they have
