= Tahneh =

Tahneh, Iran تهنه
- village
- Location within Iran
- Coordinates: 35°44′37″N 52°30′14″E
- Country: Iran
- Province: Tehran
- County: Firuzkuh
- Bakhsh: Arjomand
- Rural District: Doboluk
- Elevation: 2,280 m (7,480 ft)

Population (2006)
  - Total: 134
- Time zone: UTC+3:30 (IRST)
  - Summer (DST): UTC+4:30 (IRDT)

Tahneh (Persian: طهنه, also Romanized as Ţahneh) is a village in Doboluk Rural District, Arjomand District, Firuzkuh County, Tehran Province, Iran. At the 2006 census, its population was 134, in 45 families.
