= Salman, Tehran =

Salman Qutub سلمان
- village
- Location within Iran
- Coordinates: 35°43′54″N 52°34′05″E
- Country: Iran
- Province: Tehran
- County: Firuzkuh
- Bakhsh: Arjomand
- Rural District: Doboluk
- Elevation: 2,150 m (7,050 ft)

Population (2006)
  - Total: 135
- Time zone: UTC+3:30 (IRST)
  - Summer (DST): UTC+4:30 (IRDT)

Salman (Persian: سلمان, also Romanized as Salmān) is a village in Doboluk Rural District, Arjomand District, Firuzkuh County, Tehran Province, Iran. At the 2006 census, its population was 135, in 30 families.
