= Bahan, Iran =

Village in Tehran province, Iran

Bahan Persian: بهان
- Village
- Location within Iran
- Coordinates: 35°47′13″N 52°24′18″E
- Country: Iran
- Province: Tehran
- County: Firuzkuh
- District: Arjomand
- Rural District: Doboluk
- Elevation: 2,260 m (7,410 ft)

Population (2016)
  - Total: 293
- Time zone: UTC+3:30 (IRST)

Bahan (Persian: بهان) (Note: Also romanized as Bahān and Behān; also known as Dīhūn) is a village in Doboluk Rural District of Arjomand District in Firuzkuh County, Tehran province, Iran.

== Demographics ==
=== Population ===
At the time of the 2006 National Census, the village's population was 218 in 57 households. The following census in 2011 counted 299 people in 113 households. The 2016 census measured the population of the village as 293 people in 98 households.
