= Shadmahan =

Shadmahan may refer to:

- Shadman, Qazvin, Qazvin Province
- Shad Mehan, Tehran Province
