= Varskhowran =

Village in Tehran province, Iran

Varskhowran Persian: ورسخوران
- Village
- Location within Iran
- Coordinates: 35°43′45″N 52°31′33″E
- Country: Iran
- Province: Tehran
- County: Firuzkuh
- District: Arjomand
- Rural District: Doboluk
- Elevation: 2,250 m (7,380 ft)

Population (2016)
  - Total: 329
- Time zone: UTC+3:30 (IRST)

Varskhkhowran (Persian: ورسخوران) (Note: Also romanized as Varskhvaran and Varskhvārān; also known as Varakshvārān, Varaskhvāran, and Vereskeh Vārān) is a village in Doboluk Rural District of Arjomand District in Firuzkuh County, Tehran province, Iran.

== Demographics ==
=== Population ===
At the time of the 2006 National Census, the village's population was 463 in 141 households. The following census in 2011 counted 207 people in 81 households. The 2016 census measured the population of the village as 329 people in 105 households.
