= Veshtan =

Village in Tehran province, Iran

Veshtan Persian: وشتان
- Village
- Location within Iran
- Coordinates: 35°46′20″N 52°30′04″E
- Country: Iran
- Province: Tehran
- County: Firuzkuh
- District: Arjomand
- Rural District: Doboluk
- Elevation: 2,120 m (6,960 ft)

Population (2016)
  - Total: 327
- Time zone: UTC+3:30 (IRST)

Veshtan (Persian: وشتان) (Note: Also romanized as Veshtān and Voshtān) is a village in Doboluk Rural District of Arjomand District in Firuzkuh County, Tehran province, Iran.

== Demographics ==
=== Population ===
At the time of the 2006 National Census, the village's population was 222 in 78 households. The following census in 2011 counted 325 people in 111 households. The 2016 census measured the population of the village as 327 people in 95 households.
