= Ahnaz =

Village in Tehran province, Iran

Ahnaz Persian: اهنز
- Village
- Location within Iran
- Coordinates: 35°51′38″N 52°32′34″E
- Country: Iran
- Province: Tehran
- County: Firuzkuh
- District: Arjomand
- Rural District: Qazqanchay
- Elevation: 2,320 m (7,610 ft)

Population (2016)
  - Total: 418
- Time zone: UTC+3:30 (IRST)

Ahnaz (Persian: اهنز) (Note: Also romanized as Ahanaz and Ehenz; also known as Āhang and Ahing) is a village in Qazqanchay Rural District of Arjomand District in Firuzkuh County, Tehran province, Iran.

== Demographics ==
=== Population ===
At the time of the 2006 National Census, the village's population was 485 in 124 households. The following census in 2011 counted 398 people in 112 households. The 2016 census measured the population of the village as 418 people in 139 households.
