= Geography of Mesopotamia =

Map showing the extent of Mesopotamia

The geography of Mesopotamia, encompassing its ethnology and history, is centered on the two great rivers, the Tigris and Euphrates. While the southern is flat and marshy, the near approach of the two rivers to one another, at a spot where the undulating plateau of the north sinks suddenly into the Babylonian alluvium, tends to separate them still more completely. In the earliest recorded times, the northern portion was included in Mesopotamia; it was marked off as Assyria after the rise of the Assyrian monarchy. Apart from Assur, the original capital of Assyria, the chief cities of the country, Nineveh, Kalaḫ and Arbela, were all on the east bank of the Tigris. The reason was its abundant supply of water, whereas the great plain on the western side had to depend on streams flowing into the Euphrates.

== Defining Mesopotamia ==
Mesopotamia means "(Land) between two rivers" in ancient Greek, referring to the land between the Tigris and Euphrates rivers, but the region can be broadly defined to include the area that is now most of Iraq, eastern Syria, southeastern Turkey. The oldest known occurrence of the name Mesopotamia dates to the 4th century BCE, when it was used to designate the land east of the Euphrates in north Syria. In modern times it has been more generally applied to all the lands between the Euphrates and the Tigris, thereby incorporating not only parts of Syria but also almost all of Iraq and southeastern Turkey, and parts of southwestern Iran. The neighboring steppes to the west of the Euphrates and the western part of the Zagros Mountains are also often included under the wider term Mesopotamia. A further distinction is usually made between Upper or Northern Mesopotamia and Lower or Southern Mesopotamia. Upper Mesopotamia, also known as the Jazirah, is the area between the Euphrates and the Tigris from their sources down to Baghdad. Lower Mesopotamia is the area from Baghdad to the Persian Gulf. In modern scientific usage, the term Mesopotamia often also has a chronological connotation. In modern Western historiography of the region, the term "Mesopotamia" is usually used to designate the area from the beginning of time, until the Muslim conquest in the 630s, with the Arabic names Iraq and Jazirah being to describe the region after that live event.

== Upper Mesopotamia ==
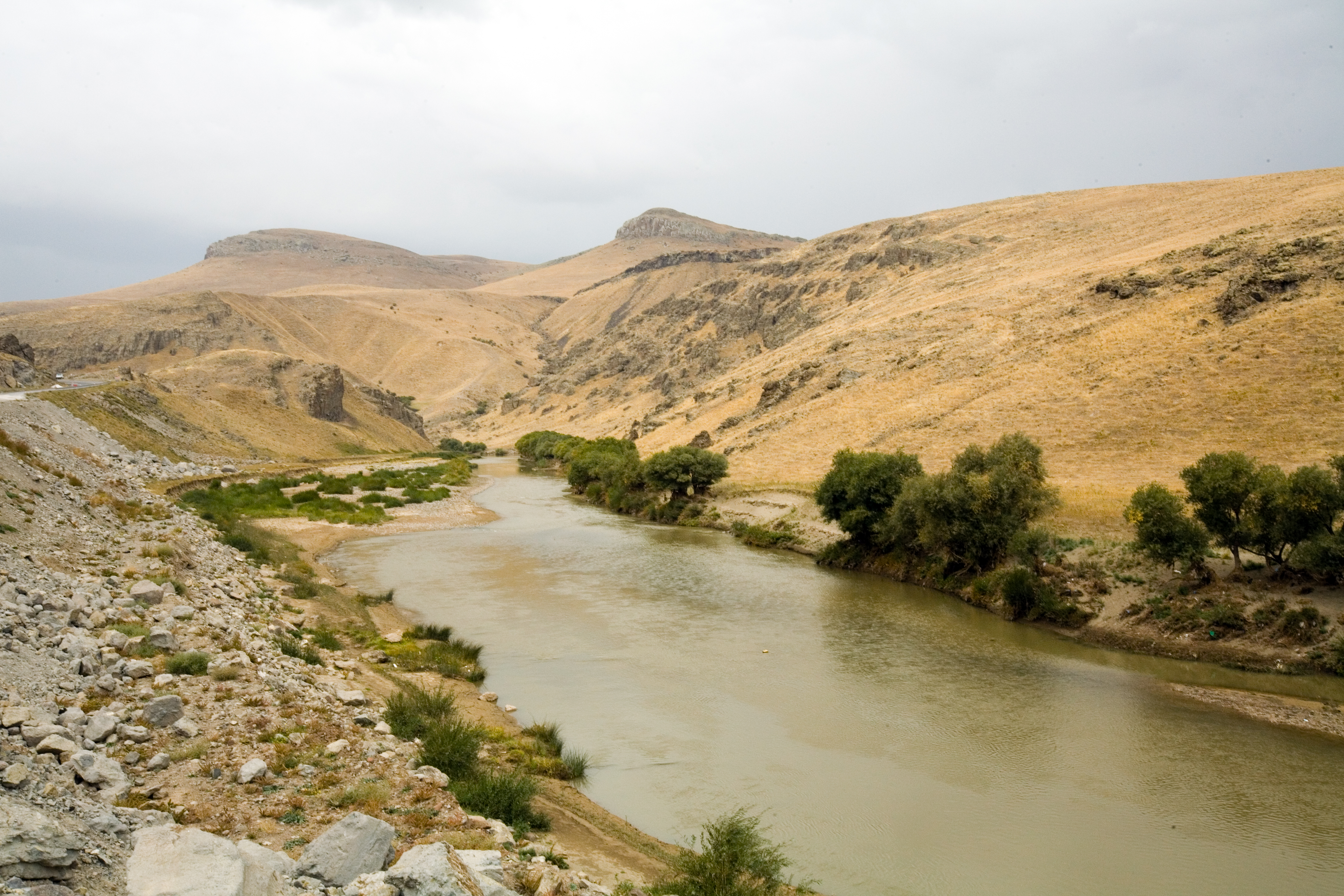
View of the Murat River, one of the tributaries to the Euphrates, in southeastern Turkey

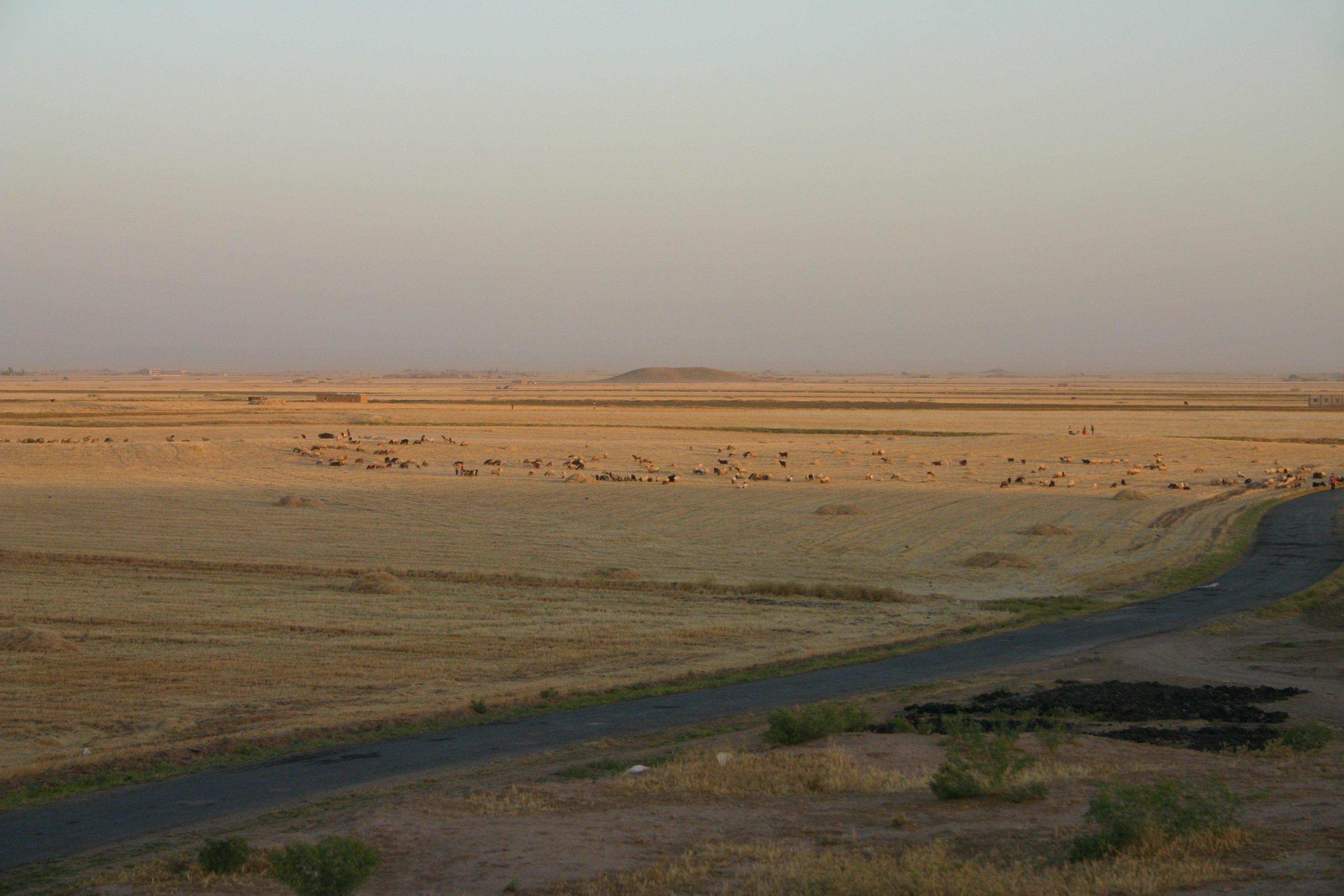
Typical view of farmland in the area north of al-Hasakah, with an ancient tell visible on the horizon

This vast flat is about 250 miles (400 km) in length, interrupted only by a single limestone range rising abruptly out of the plain, and branching off from the Zagros Mountains under the names of Sarazur, Hamrin Mountains and Sinjar Mountains. The numerous remains of old habitations show how thickly this level tract must once have been peopled, though now mostly a wilderness. North of the plateau rises a well-watered and undulating belt of country, into which run low ranges of limestone hills, sometimes arid, sometimes covered with dwarf oak, and often shutting in, between their northern and northeastern flank and the main mountain line from which they detach themselves, rich plains and fertile valleys. Behind them tower the massive ridges of the Euphrates and Zagros ranges, where the Tigris and Euphrates take their rise, and which cut off Assyria from Armenia and Kurdistan. The name Assyria itself was derived from that of the city of Assur or Asur, now Qal'at Sherqat (Kaleh Shergat), on the right bank of the Tigris, midway between the Great and Little Zab. It remained the capital long after the Assyrians had become the dominant power in western Asia, but was finally supplanted by Calah (Nimrud), Nineveh (Nebi Vunus and Kuyunjik), and Dur-Sharrukin (Khorsabad), some 60 miles (97 km) farther north.

== Lower Mesopotamia ==
In contrast with the arid plateau of Mesopotamia stretched the rich alluvial plain of Chaldea, formed by the deposits of the two great rivers that encircled it. The soil was extremely fertile, and teemed with an industrious population. Eastward rose the mountains of Elam, southward were the sea-marshes and the Kaldy or Chaldeans and other Arameans, while on the west the civilization of Babylonia encroached beyond the banks of the Euphrates, upon the territory of the nomadic ancient Semitic-speaking peoples (or Suti). Here stood Ur (Mugheir, more correctly Muqayyar) the earliest capital of the country; and Babylon, with its suburb, Borsippa (Birs Nimrud), as well as the two Sippars (the Sepharvaim of Scripture, now Abu Habba), occupied both the Arabian and Chaldaean sides of the river. The Arakhtu, or "river of Babylon," flowed past the southern side of the city, and to the southwest of it on the Arabian bank lay the great inland freshwater sea of Najaf, surrounded by red sandstone cliffs of considerable height, 40 miles (64 km) in length and 35 in breadth in the widest part. Above and below this sea, from Borsippa to Kufa, extend the famous Chaldaean marshes, where Alexander the Great was nearly lost (Arrian, Eup. Al. vii. 22; Strabo xvi. I, § 12); but these depend upon the state of the Hindiya canal, disappearing altogether when it is closed.

Eastward of the Euphrates and southward of Sippara, Kutha and Babylon were Kish (Ultaimir, 9 miles (14 km) E. of Hillah), Nippur (Niffer)-where stood the great sanctuary of El-lu, the older Bel-Uruk or Uruk (Arabic Warka) and Larsa (Arabic Senkera) with its temple of the sun god, while eastward of the Shatt el-Hai, probably the ancient channel of the Tigris, was Lagash (Tello), which played an important part in early Babylonian history.

The primitive seaport of the country, Eridu, the seat of the worship of Ea the culture-god, was a little south of Ur on the west side of the Euphrates. It is now about 130 miles (210 km) from the sea; as about 46 inches of land have been formed by the silting up of the shore since the foundation of Charax Spasinu in the time of Alexander the Great, or some 115 feet (35 m) a year, the city would have existed perhaps 6000 years ago. The marshes in the south, like the adjoining desert, were frequented by Aramaic tribes; of these, the most famous were the Ancient Chaldeans, who, under Marduk-apla-iddina II, made themselves masters of Babylon and gave their name in later days to the whole population of the country. The combined stream of the Euphrates and Tigris as it flowed through the marshes was known to the Babylonians as the ndr marrati, "the salt river" (cp. Book of Jeremiah 1:21), a name originally applied to the Persian Gulf.

The alluvial plain of Babylonia was called Edin, though the name was properly restricted to "the plain" on the western bank of the river where the Bedouins pastured the flocks of their Babylonian masters. This "bank" or kisad, together with the corresponding western bank of the Tigris (according to Fritz Hommel, the modern Shatt el-Uai), gave its name to the land of Chesed, whence the Kasdim or Kasdin of the Hebrew Bible. In the early inscriptions of Lagash, the whole district is known as Gu-Edinna, the Sumerian equivalent of the Semitic Kisad Edini. The coastland was similarly known as Gu-gubba (Akkadian Kisad tamtim) "bank of the sea."

A more comprehensive name of southern Mesopotamia was Kengi, "the land," or Kengi Sumer, "the land of Sumer". Sumer has been supposed to be the original of the Biblical Shinar and the Sankhar of the Amarna letters. Opposed to Kengi and Sumer were Urra (Un) and Akkad or northern Babylonia. The original meaning of Urra was perhaps "clayey soil," but it came to signify "the upper country" or "highlands," kengi being "the lowlands." In Semitic times, Urra was pronounced Un and confounded with uru, "city" as a geographical term, however, it was replaced by Akkadu, the Semitic form of Agade - written Akkattim in the Elamite inscriptions - the name of Sargon of Akkad's capital. The rise of Sargon's empire was the probable cause of this extension of the name of Akkad; henceforward in the imperial title, "Sumer and Akkad" denoted the whole of Babylonia. After the Kassite conquest of the country, northern Babylonia came to be known as Kar-Duniyash, "the wall of the god Duniyask," from a line of forts similar to that built by Nebuchadnezzar II between Sippar and Opis, to defend his kingdom from attacks from the north. As this last was "the Wall of Semiramis" mentioned by Strabo (xi. 14. 8), Kar-Duniyash may have represented the Median Wall of Xenophon (Anab. ii. 4. 12), traces of which were found by F.R. Chesney extending from Fallujah to Jibar.

== Perennial irrigation ==
The dense population arose from the elaborate irrigation of the Babylonian plain, which had originally reclaimed it from a pestiferous and uninhabitable swamp, and had made it the most fertile country in the world. The science of irrigation and engineering seems to have been first developed in Babylonia, which was covered by a network of canals, all skillfully planned and regulated. The three chief of them carried off the waters of the Euphrates to the Tigris above Babylon: the Zabzallat canal (or Nahr Sarsar) running from Faluja to Ctesiphon, the Kutha canal from Sippara to Madam, passing Tell Ibrahim or Kuth'a on the way, and the King's canal or Ar-Malcha between the other two. This last, which perhaps owed its name to Hammurabi, was conducted from the Euphrates towards Upi or Opis, which has been shown by H. Winckler (Altorientalische Forschungen, ii. pp. 509 seq.) to have been close to Seleucia on the western side of the Tigris. The Pallacopas, called Pallukkatu in the Neo-Babylonian texts, started from Pallukkatu or Falluja, and running parallel to the western bank of the Euphrates as far as Iddaratu or Teredon, (?) watered an immense tract of land and supplied a large lake near Borsippa. B. Meissner may be right in identifying it with "the Canal of the Sun-god" of the early texts.

Thanks to this system of irrigation, the cultivation of the soil was highly advanced in Babylonia. According to Herodotus (1.193), wheat commonly returned two hundredfold to the sower, and occasionally three hundredfold. Pliny the Elder (H. N. xviii. 11) states that it was cut twice, and afterwards was good keep for sheep, and Berossus remarked that wheat, sesame, barley, ophrys, palms, apples and many kinds of shelled fruit grew wild, as wheat still does in the neighbourhood of Anah. A Persian poem celebrated the 360 uses of the palm (Strabo xvi. I. 14), and Ammianus Marcellinus (xxiv. 3) says that from the point reached by Julian's army to the shores of the Persian Gulf was one continuous forest of verdure.

=== Ancient canals ===
The location of most of the major cities such as Kish, Uruk, Lagash etc. is known with certainty, while the location of minor settlements, situated along a network of canals, is more difficult to reconstruct. An important source of Mesopotamian toponymy is the great Babylonian encyclopedia Urra=hubullu and its commentaries. These texts contain lists of toponyms, but circumstantial evidence is required to correlate these with their geographical location. The most useful category of texts for this purpose are itineraries, which list settlements in the sequence they are passed by a traveller.

Important canals of Sumer included

- the Zubi canal (Izubi, Akkadian Izubitum), a short-cut of the Tigris between the locations of modern Samarra and Baghdad. Settlements along this canal included Hibaritum and Push.
- the Irnina canal, joined the Zubi canal above Push. Settlements along this canal included Hiritum, Hursitum, Sarru-Laba, Namzium.
- the Gibil canal ran southwest from the Tigris to a point south of the frontier city of Kesh, past a branch which went north to that city. The Gibil continued on to Apišal where it intersected with the Ninagina Canal which flowed southeast from Zabalam. From Apišal, the Gibil went on to Umma, where it joined the Iturungal canal.
- The Iturungal canal left the Euphrates below Nippur running past Adab, Dabrum, Zabalam, Umma, Nagsu, Bad-tibira and Larsa and between Uruk and Enegi before rejoining the Euphrates.
- The Susuka canal ran southeast from Ur to Eridu.

== See also ==
- Geography of Iraq
- History of Iraq
- Geography of Kuwait
- Geography of Syria
- Geography of Iran
- Geography of Turkey

== Bibliography ==
- Bahrani, Z. (1998), "Conjuring Mesopotamia: Imaginative Geography and a World Past", in Meskell, L. (ed.), Archaeology under Fire: Nationalism, Politics and Heritage in the Eastern Mediterranean and Middle East, London: Routledge, pp. 159–174, ISBN 978-0-415-19655-0
- Canard, M. (2011), "al-ḎJazīra, Ḏjazīrat Aḳūr or Iḳlīm Aḳūr", in Bearman, P.; Bianquis, Th.; Bosworth, C.E.; van Donzel, E.; Heinrichs, W.P. (eds.), Encyclopaedia of Islam, Second Edition, Leiden: Brill Online, OCLC 624382576
- Finkelstein, J.J. (1962), "Mesopotamia", Journal of Near Eastern Studies, 21 (2): 73–92, doi:10.1086/371676, JSTOR 543884, S2CID 222432558
- Foster, Benjamin R.; Polinger Foster, Karen (2009), Civilizations of Ancient Iraq, Princeton: Princeton University Press, ISBN 978-0-691-13722-3
- Matthews, Roger (2003), The Archaeology of Mesopotamia. Theories and Approaches, Approaching the past, Milton Square: Routledge, ISBN 0-415-25317-9
- Miquel, A.; Brice, W.C.; Sourdel, D.; Aubin, J.; Holt, P.M.; Kelidar, A.; Blanc, H.; MacKenzie, D.N.; Pellat, Ch. (2011), "ʿIrāḳ", in Bearman, P.; Bianquis, Th.; Bosworth, C.E.; van Donzel, E.; Heinrichs, W.P. (eds.), Encyclopaedia of Islam, Second Edition, Leiden: Brill Online, OCLC 624382576
- Wilkinson, Tony J. (2000), "Regional Approaches to Mesopotamian Archaeology: the Contribution of Archaeological Surveys", Journal of Archaeological Research, 8 (3): 219–267, doi:10.1023/A:1009487620969, ISSN 1573-7756, S2CID 140771958
