= Andariyeh =

Village in Tehran province, Iran

Andariyeh Persian: اندريه
- Village
- Location within Iran
- Coordinates: 35°47′06″N 52°27′09″E
- Country: Iran
- Province: Tehran
- County: Firuzkuh
- District: Arjomand
- Rural District: Doboluk
- Elevation: 2,150 m (7,050 ft)

Population (2016)
  - Total: 378
- Time zone: UTC+3:30 (IRST)

Andariyeh (Persian: اندريه) (Note: Also romanized as Andarīyeh and Ondarīyeh; also known as Undarīyeh) is a village in Doboluk Rural District of Arjomand District in Firuzkuh County, Tehran province, Iran.

== Demographics ==
=== Population ===
At the time of the 2006 National Census, the village's population was 443 in 129 households. The following census in 2011 counted 325 people in 109 households. The 2016 census measured the population of the village as 378 people in 142 households.
