= Bahanak =

Village in Tehran province, Iran

Bahanak Persian: بهانك
- Village
- Location within Iran
- Coordinates: 35°50′15″N 52°33′24″E
- Country: Iran
- Province: Tehran
- County: Firuzkuh
- District: Arjomand
- Rural District: Qazqanchay

Population (2016)
  - Total: 8
- Time zone: UTC+3:30 (IRST)

Bahanak (Persian: بهانك) is a village in Qazqanchay Rural District of Arjomand District in Firuzkuh County, Tehran province, Iran.

== Demographics ==
=== Population ===
At the time of the 2006 and 2011 National Censuses, the village's population was below the reporting threshold. The 2016 census measured the population of the village as eight people in four households.
