= Najafdar =

Village in Tehran province, Iran

Najafdar Persian: نجفدر
- Village
- Location within Iran
- Coordinates: 35°47′22″N 52°22′39″E
- Country: Iran
- Province: Tehran
- County: Firuzkuh
- District: Arjomand
- Rural District: Doboluk
- Elevation: 2,350 m (7,710 ft)

Population (2016)
  - Total: 420
- Time zone: UTC+3:30 (IRST)

Najafdar (Persian: نجفدر) (Note: Also romanized as Nejafdar) is a village in Doboluk Rural District of Arjomand District in Firuzkuh County, Tehran province, Iran.

== Demographics ==
=== Population ===
At the time of the 2006 National Census, the village's population was 211 in 66 households. The following census in 2011 counted 408 people in 138 households. The 2016 census measured the population of the village as 420 people in 148 households.
