= Upper Mesopotamia =

Northern part of the region between the Tigris and Euphrates rivers

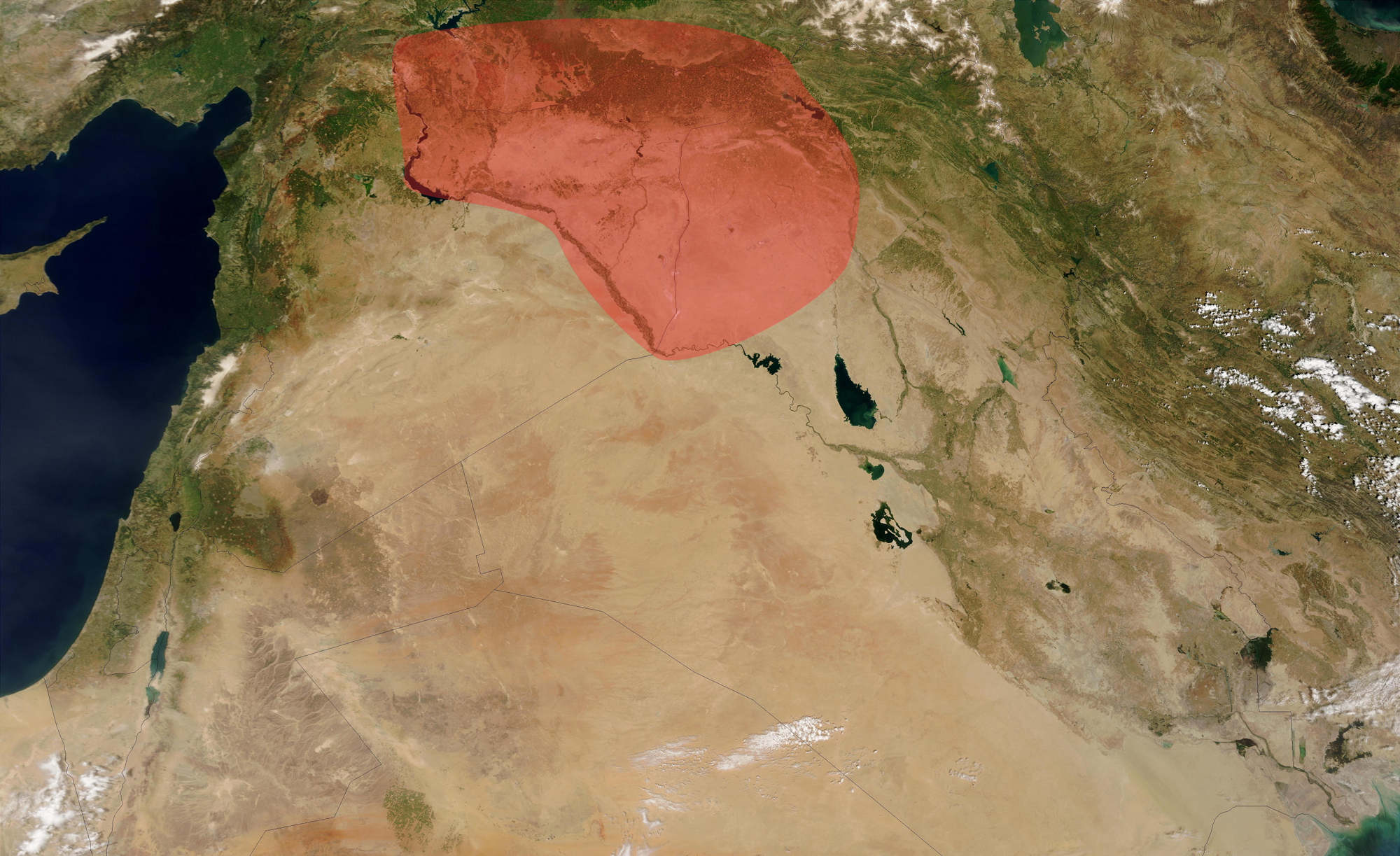
Upper Mesopotamia Region (Al-Jazira), within the Middle East.

Upper Mesopotamia or Upper Iraq, also called Jazira, the Iraqi Jazira or the Euphrates Jazira, constitutes the uplands and great outwash plain of northwestern Iraq, northeastern Syria and southeastern Turkey, in West Asia. Since the early Muslim conquests of the mid-7th century, the region has been known by the traditional Arabic name of al-Jazira (Arabic: الجزيرة, lit. 'the island', also transliterated Djazirah, Djezirah, Jazirah) and the Syriac variant Gāzartā or Gozarto (ܓܙܪܬܐ). The Euphrates and Tigris rivers transform Mesopotamia into almost an island, as they are joined at the Shatt al-Arab in the Basra Governorate of Iraq, and their sources in eastern Turkey are in close proximity.

The region extends south from the mountains of Anatolia, east from the hills on the left bank of the Euphrates river, west from the mountains on the right bank of the Tigris river and includes the Sinjar plain. It extends down the Tigris to Samarra and down the Euphrates to Hit, Iraq. The Khabur runs for over 400 km (250 mi) across the plain, from Turkey in the north, feeding into the Euphrates.

The major settlements are Mosul, Deir ez-Zor, Raqqa, al-Hasakah, Diyarbakır, and Qamishli. The western Syrian part is essentially contiguous with the Syrian al-Hasakah Governorate and is described as "Syria's breadbasket". The eastern Iraqi part includes the cities of Mosul, Duhok, Amedi and extends eastward just beyond Erbil. In the north it includes the Turkish provinces of Şanlıurfa, Mardin, Şırnak, and parts of Batman Province and Diyarbakır Province.

== Name ==
The name Mesopotamia is derived from Ancient Greek, meaning “the land between the two rivers,” in reference to the Tigris and Euphrates rivers. The earliest known antecedent of the name is the Akkadian term Bīritum Nārim, which corresponds to a similar geographical concept.

Following the Islamic conquest, the historical region of Mesopotamia came to be known as Iraq, and the names of its constituent regions consequently changed as well. Upper Mesopotamia came to be known as al-Jazīra (Arabic: الجزيرة), an Arabic term meaning “island,” referring to a land surrounded by water. and the Syriac variant Gāzartā or Gozarto (ܓܙܪܬܐ).

It is also known as al-Jazīra al-ʿIrāqiyya (الجزيرة العراقية, lit. 'the Iraqi Jazira'), as it constituted the northern part of the land of Iraq. It is also referred to as al-Jazīra al-Furātiyya (الجزيرة الفراتية, lit. 'the Euphrates Jazira'), owing to the numerous branches and distributaries of the Euphrates in the region. It is also sometimes referred to as Iqlīm ʾAqūr (إقليم أقور, lit. 'the Region of Aqūr'). Some scholars have proposed that the term Aqūr is a corrupted form of the name Ashūr.

== Geography ==
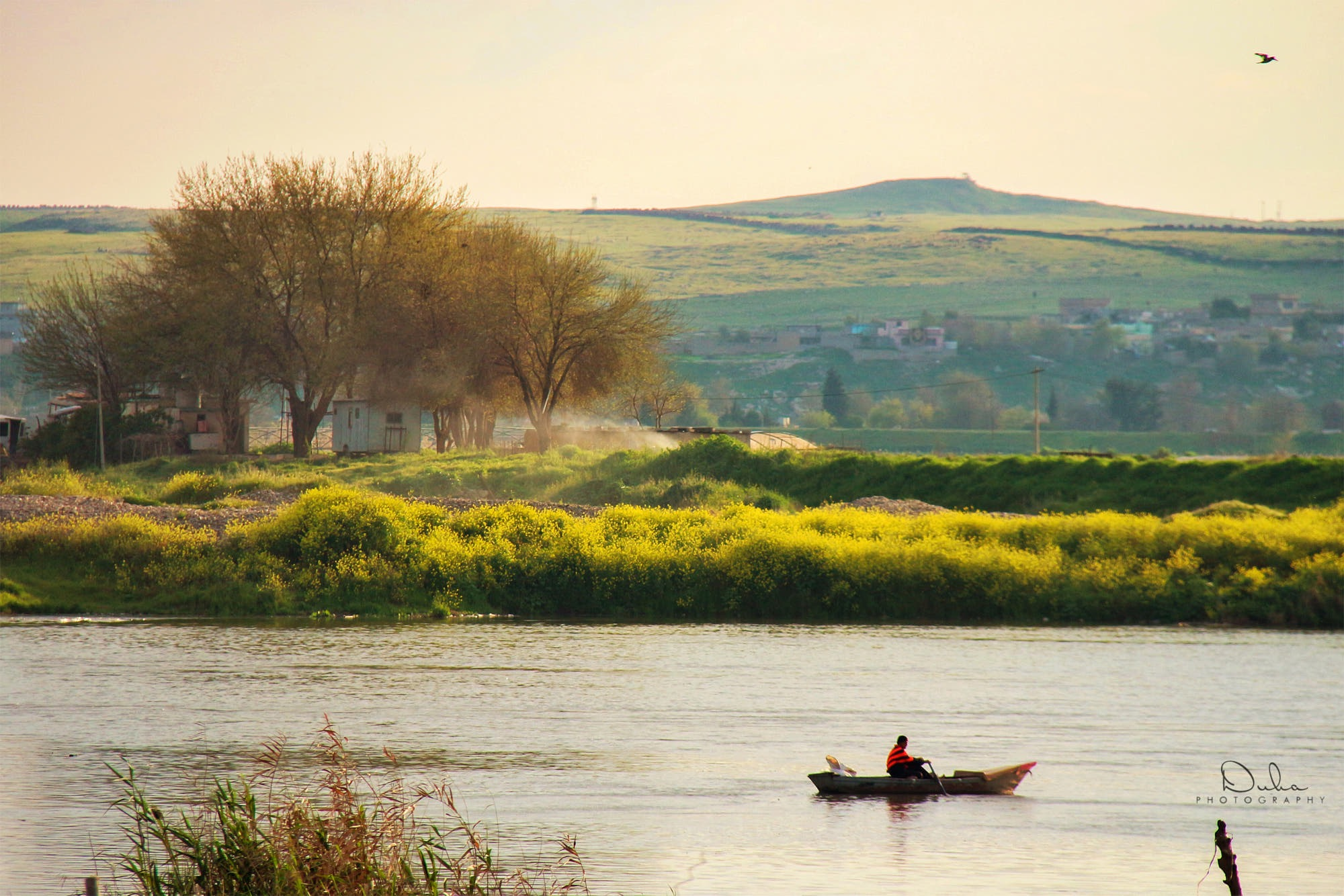
Tigris river flows through Mosul, near the ancient Assyrian city of Nineveh, which is a major settlement and hosts farmland in Upper Mesopotamia.

The name al-Jazira has been used since the 7th century AD by Islamic sources to refer to the northern section of Mesopotamia, while the Lower Mesopotamia, also known as Sawād, is the southern part of Mesopotamia. The name means "island", and at one time referred to the land between the two rivers, which in Syriac is Beth Nahrain (ܒܝܬ ܢܗܪ̈ܝܢ). Historically, the name could be restricted to the Sinjar plain coming down from the Sinjar Mountains, or expanded to embrace the entire plateau east of the coastal ranges. In pre-Abbasid times the western and eastern boundaries seem to have fluctuated, sometimes including what is now northern Syria to the west and Adiabene in the east.

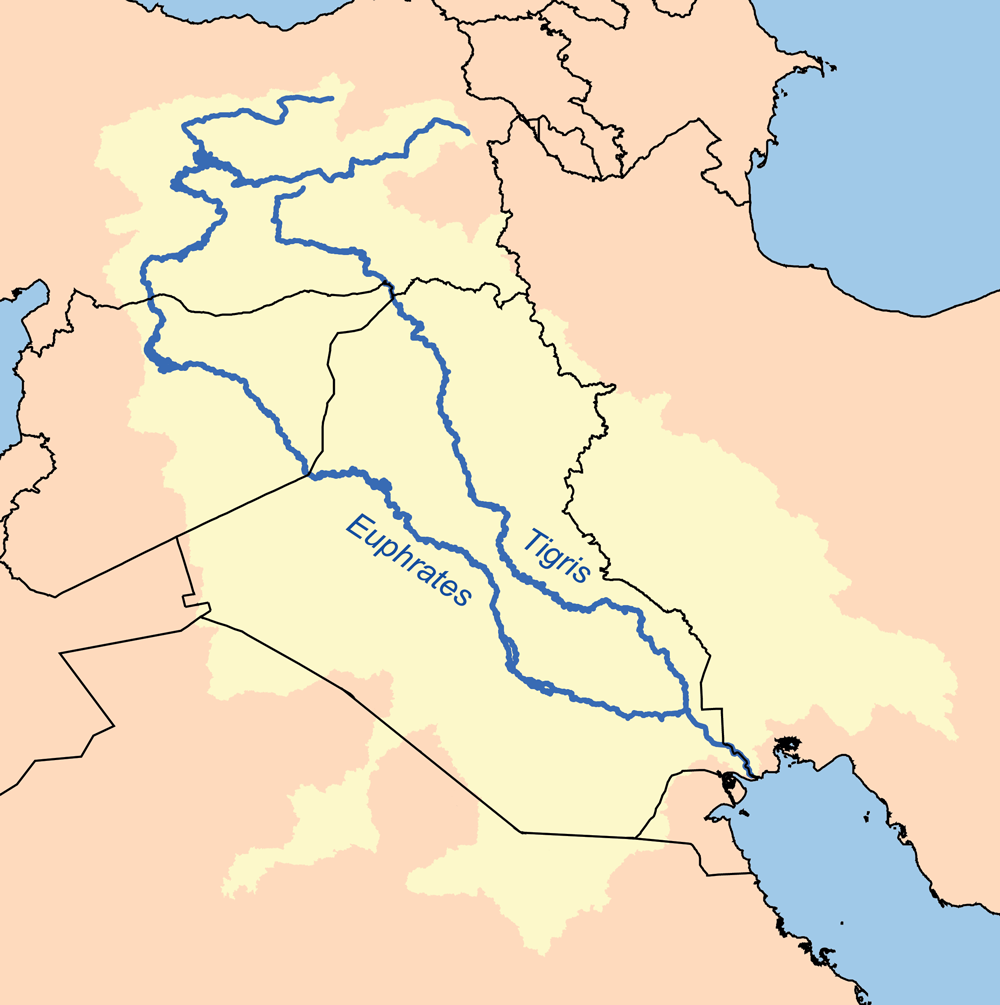
The Euphrates and Tigris rivers transform Mesopotamia into almost an island (hence the Arabic name al Jazira, meaning island), as they are joined at the Shatt al-Arab in the Basra Governorate of Iraq, and their sources in eastern Turkey are in close proximity.

Al-Jazira is characterised as an outwash or alluvial plain, quite distinct from the Syrian Desert and lower-lying central Mesopotamia; however, the area includes eroded hills and incised streams. The region has several parts to it. In the northwest is one of the largest salt flats in the world, Sabkhat al-Jabbul. Further south, extending from Mosul to near Basra is a sandy desert not unlike the Empty Quarter. In the late 20th and early 21st centuries the region has been plagued by drought.

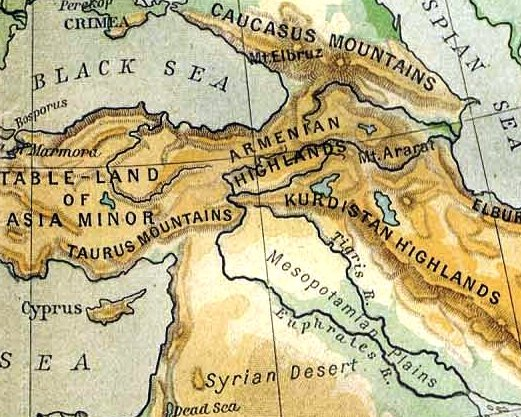
Map from Historical Atlas (1923) showing Upper Mesopotamia is bordered from the northeast by the Kurdistan Highlands, north-northwest by the Taurus mountains and the south by the Syrian desert

== History ==
=== Prehistory ===
Al-Jazirah is extremely important archeologically. This is the area where the earliest signs of agriculture and domestication of animals have been found, and thus the starting point leading to civilization and the modern world. Al-Jazirah includes the mountain Karaca Dağ in southern Turkey, where the closest relative to modern wheat still grows wild. At several sites (e.g. Hallan Çemi, Abu Hureyra, Mureybet) we can see a continuous occupation from a hunter-gathering lifestyle (based on hunting, and gathering and grinding of wild grains) to an economy based mainly on growing (still wild varieties of) wheat, barley and legumes from around 9000 BC (see PPNA). Domestication of goats and sheep followed within a few generations, but did not become widespread for more than a millennium (see PPNB). Weaving and pottery followed about two thousand years later.

From Al-Jazirah the idea of farming along with the domesticated seeds spread first to the rest of the Levant and then to North-Africa, Europe and eastwards through Mesopotamia all the way to present-day Pakistan (see Mehrgarh).

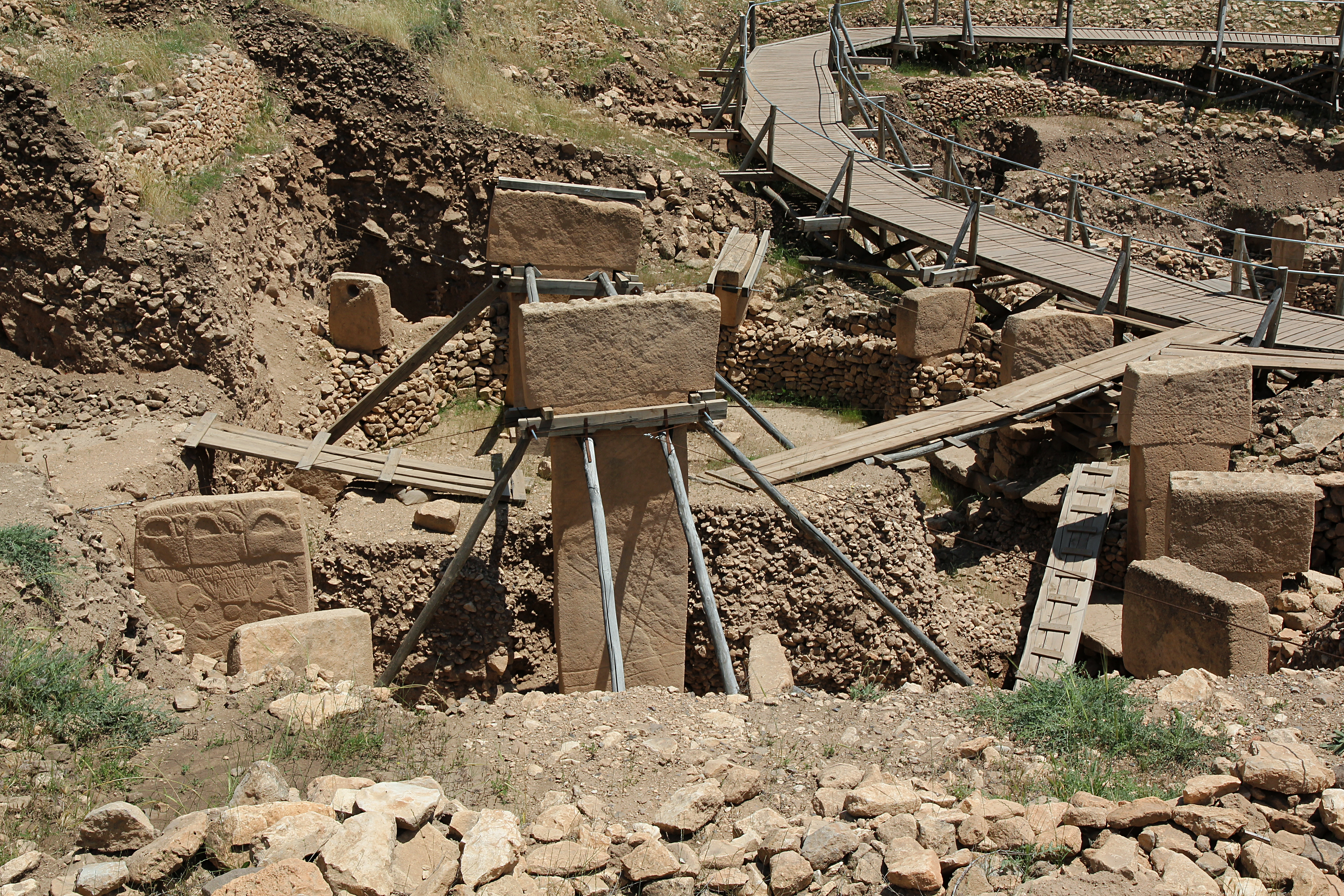
Monumental stone buildings at Göbekli Tepe, c. 9000 BC

Earlier archeologists worked on the assumption that agriculture was a prerequisite to a sedentary lifestyle, but excavations in Israel and Lebanon surprised science by showing that a sedentary lifestyle actually came before agriculture (see the Natufian culture). Further surprises followed in the 1990s with the spectacular finds of the megalithic structures at Göbekli Tepe in south-eastern Turkey. The earliest of these apparently ritual buildings are from before 9000 BC—over five thousand years older than Stonehenge—and thus the absolute oldest known megalithic structures anywhere. As far as current knowledge goes, there were no firmly established farming societies during that time period. Farming appeared to be in an experimental stage, serving primarily as a supplement to ongoing hunting and gathering practices. This raises questions about whether (semi)sedentary hunter-gatherer communities were sufficiently affluent and numerous to coordinate and carry out large-scale communal construction projects. Alternatively, it suggests the possibility that well-established agricultural societies may have existed much earlier than previously recognized. Notably, Göbekli Tepe is located just 32 km from Karaca Dağ.

The questions raised by Göbekli Tepe have led to intense and creative discussions among archeologists of the Middle East. Excavations at Göbekli Tepe continues, only about 5 percent has been revealed so far. Sumerians are theorized to have evolved from the Samarra culture of northern Mesopotamia.

=== Early history ===
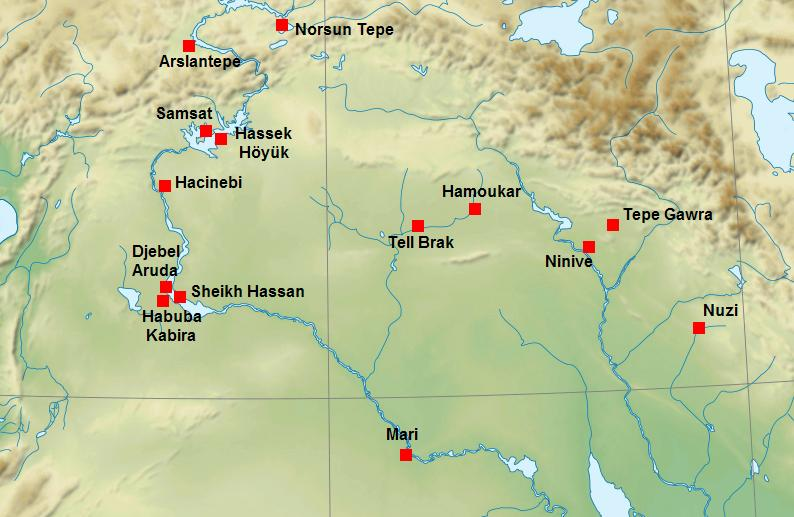
Uruk period (c. 4000 to 3100 BC)

The Uruk period (c. 4000 to 3100 BC) existed from the protohistoric Chalcolithic to Early Bronze Age period in Mesopotamia, including a section of the upper region.

The political history of Upper Mesopotamia and Syria during the Early Dynastic Period is well known from the royal archives recovered at Ebla. Ebla, Mari, and Nagar were the dominant states for this period. The earliest texts indicate that Ebla paid tribute to Mari but was able to reduce it after it won a military victory. Cities like Emar on the Upper Euphrates and Abarsal (location unknown) were vassals of Ebla. Ebla exchanged gifts with Nagar, and a royal marriage was concluded between the daughter of a king of Ebla and the son of his counterpart at Nagar. The archives also contain letters from more distant kingdoms, such as Kish and possibly Hamazi, although it is also possible that there were cities with the same names closer to Ebla. In many ways, the diplomatic interactions in the wider Ancient Near East during this period resemble those from the second millennium BC, which are particularly well known from the Amarna letters.

Upper Mesopotamia is the heartland of ancient Assyria. From the 23rd Century BC it was part of the Akkadian Empire. When the empire broke up, the northern Akkadians formed Assyria, and from 2000 BC until 608 BC it was an integral part of the Assyrian nation, and the Neo Assyrian Empire. The region fell to the Assyrians' southern brethren, the Babylonians in 608 BC, and from 539 BC it became part of the Persian Achaemenid Empire where it was known as Athura (Persian for Assyria). From 330 BC it was ruled by the Greek Seleucid Empire, the Greeks corrupting the name to Syria. It then fell to the Parthians and Romans and was renamed Assyria by both. The area was still known as Assuristan (Assyria) under the Persian Sassanid Empire until the Arab Islamic conquest of the 7th Century AD when it was renamed al-Jazira.

Since and pre-Islamic times, al-Jazira has been an economically prosperous region with various agricultural (fruit and cereal) products, as well as a prolific manufacturing (food processing and cloth weaving) system. The region's position at the border of the Sasanian and Byzantine territories also made it an important commercial center, an advantage that the region continued to enjoy, even after the Muslim conquest of Persia and Byzantine possessions in the Levant.

Al-Jazira included the Roman/Byzantine provinces of Osroene and Mesopotamia, as well as the Parthian/Persian provinces of Asōristān, Arbayestan, Adiabene (including Nisibis and Mosul). East and West Syriac monasticism, which had come into the region in the late fourth century, flourished in the sixth and early seventh century and survived into the Islamic period, with some monasteries even being founded up to the eight century, especially in the Tur Abdin.

=== Islamic empires ===
Al-Jazira region and its subdivisions (Diyar Bakr, Diyar Mudar, and Diyar Rabi'a), during the Umayyad and Abbasid calipahtes

The conquest of the region took place under the early Caliphate that left the general administration of the region intact, with the exception of levying the jizya tax on the population. At the time of Mu‘awiyah, governor of Syria and the later of the Umayyad Caliphate), the administration of al-Jazira was included in the administration of Syria. During the early Umayyad Caliphate, the administration of al-Jazira was often shared with that of Arminiya, a vast province encompassing most of Transcaucasia, Eastern Anatolia and what is now Iranian Azerbaijan.

The prosperity of the region and its high agricultural and manufacturing output made it an object of contest between the leaders of the early conquering Arab armies. Various conquerors tried, in vain, to bind various cities of the former Sasanian provinces, as well as the newly conquered Byzantine provinces of Mesopotamia, into a coherent unit under their own rule.

The control of the region, however, was essential to any power centered in Baghdad. Consequently, the establishment of the Abbasid Caliphate brought al-Jazira under the direct rule of the government in Baghdad. At this time, al-Jazira was one of the highest tax-yielding provinces of the Abbasid Empire.

During the early history of Islam, al-Jazira became a center for the Kharijite movement and had to be constantly subdued by various caliphs. In the 920s, the local Hamdanid dynasty established an autonomous state with two branches in al-Jazira (under Nasir al-Dawla) and Northern Syria (under Sayf al-Dawla). The demise of the Hamdanid power put the region back under the nominal rule of the Caliphs of Baghdad, while actual control was in the hands of the Buyid brothers who had conquered Baghdad itself. At the turn of the 11th century, the area came under the rule of a number of local dynasties, the Numayrids, the Mirdasids, and the Uqaylids, who persisted until the conquest by the Seljuq Empire.

With the arrival of the First Crusade, the western part came into Crusader hands as the County of Edessa, while the rest was ruled by a succession of semi-independent Turkish rulers until taken over by the Zengids, and eventually the Kurdish Ayyubids. Thereafter the northern and eastern portions were ruled initially by the Artuqids, laterly by the Kara Koyunlu and Akkoyunlu Turcomans and finally by the Safavids; while the western parts came under the Mamluk Sultanate of Egypt until the Ottoman–Mamluk War (1516–17), when it was taken by the Ottoman Empire. Remainder of this region was in Ottoman hands after Battle of Chaldiran and Ottoman–Safavid War (1532–1555).

=== Modern history ===
Although the region is ethnically diverse, it is considered to be the traditional Assyrian homeland in addition to Aramaic-speaking Christian descendants of the ancient Mesopotamians. Demographics saw huge shifts during the first half of the 20th century. Thousands of Assyrian refugees entered into Syrian Jazira province from Turkey following the Assyrian genocide of World War I. Additionally, in 1933 a further 24,000 Assyrian Christians fled into the area, following the Simele massacre in the Mosul region of northern Iraq.

Violence against Christians changed the demographics of Upper Mesopotamia. Some Kurdish and Persian tribes cooperated with Ottoman authorities in the Armenian and Assyrian genocides. In the middle of the 19th century, and due to the wars between the Kurdish Buhti amirs and the Turks, many Christians in the Siirt area were killed by the Kurds.

In Syria's Jazira province, the French official reports show the existence of 45 Kurdish villages in Jazira prior to 1927. After the failed Kurdish rebellions in Kemalist Turkey in the mid-1920s, there was a large influx of Kurds to Syrian Jazira province, that fell under the occupation of French Mandate authorities to escape the subsequent Turkish onslaught. It is estimated that 25,000 Kurds fled at this time to northern Syria, under French Mandate authorities, who encouraged their immigration, and granted them Syrian citizenship. A new wave of refugees arrived in 1929. The mandatory authorities continued to encourage Kurdish immigration into Syria, and by 1939, the villages numbered between 700 and 800. Sperl's estimation also contradicts the estimates of the French geographers Fevret and Gibert, who estimated that in 1953 out of the total 146,000 inhabitants of Jazira, agriculturalist Kurds made up 60,000 (41%), nomad Arabs 50,000 (34%), and a quarter of the population were Christians. Another account by Sir John Hope Simpson estimated the number of Kurds in Jazira province at 20,000 out of 100,000 people at the end of 1930.

Under the French Mandate of Syria, newly arriving Kurds were granted citizenship by French Mandate authorities and enjoyed considerable rights as the French Mandate authority encouraged minority autonomy as part of a divide and rule strategy and recruited heavily from the Kurds and other minority groups, such as Alawite and Druze, for its local armed forces.

Assyrian Christians began to emigrate from Syria after the Amuda massacre of 9 August 1937. This massacre, carried out by the Kurd Saeed Agha, emptied the city of its Assyrian population. In 1941, the Assyrian community of al-Malikiyah were subjected to a vicious assault. Even though the assault failed, the Assyrians were terrorized and left in large numbers, and the immigration of Kurds from Turkey to the area have converted al-Malikiya, al-Darbasiyah and Amuda to completely Kurdish cities. The historically important Christian city of Nusaybin had a similar fate after its Christian population left when it was annexed to Turkey. The Christian population of the city crossed the border into Syria and settled in Qamishli, which was separated by the railway (new border) from Nusaybin. Nusaybin became Kurdish and Qamishli became an Assyrian city. Things soon changed, however, with the immigration of Kurds beginning in 1926 following the failure of the rebellion of Saeed Ali Naqshbandi against the Turkish authorities.

== Regions ==
Upper Mesopotamia encompasses the northern part of West Asia. During the medieval period, Mesopotamia came to be known as Iraq, a change that was accompanied by corresponding changes in the names of its constituent regions. Upper Mesopotamia came to be known as al-Jazīra, constituting the northern part of the land of Iraq. The Muslim historian and geographer Yāqūt al-Ḥamawī attested:

Iraq comprises Basra, Wāsit, Kūfa, Baghdad, al-Anbār, Hīt, and al-Jazīra. (Note: The Jazīra constitutes Upper Mesopotamia, while the remaining cities lie within Lower Mesopotamia, with Baghdad separating the two regions.)

— Muʿjam al-Buldān

During the Gunpowder Age, al-Jazīra constituted part of the land of Iraq, which was referred to in various forms, including ʿIrāq al-ʿArab and Hıṭṭa-i ʿIrāqiyye. In the modern period, as a consequence of the World War I, the region was divided among three states: Iraq, Syria, and Turkey.

=== Syria ===
Throughout history, Iraq has maintained deep-rooted historical ties with the region known today as Syria. In antiquity, the empires of ancient Iraq, namely the Sumerian, Akkadian, Babylonian, Assyrian, and Chaldean empires, succeeded in incorporating Syrian territories under their rule, thereby satisfying the administrative unity of the ancient Near East. The name Syria (Arabic: سوريا, lit. 'Sūriyā') is also derived from Assyria in northern Iraq. During the Islamic Golden Age, Syria formed part of the territories ruled by the Abbasids and administered from Baghdad, in central Iraq.

==== East Syria ====
Iraq and eastern Syria have shared the same historical trajectory since prehistoric times, and the eastern lands of present-day Syria remain, to this day, a stronghold of Iraqi culture. The region shares with Iraq its dialect, traditions, ethnic origins. It was historically regarded as part of the land of Iraq, or of what may be termed Natural Iraq.

With intimately and inseparably intertwined histories extending over millennia, Iraq ultimately and irrevocably lost the territories that constitute present-day eastern Syria in the course of the 20th century. In the aftermath of the World War I these territories were placed under Iraqi–British administration. In 1919, Arab forces associated with the government of Faisal in Damascus occupied Zor, the administrative center of the region, bringing it under the authority of the Arab government in Syria. The subsequent defeat and expulsion of Faisal's government by French forces in July 1920 brought these territories under French colonial administration. The subsequent establishment of the French Mandate for Syria and Lebanon placed the western part of Upper Mesopotamia within the boundaries of the modern Syrian state, thereby ultimately separating the western Jazīra from Iraq.

==== West Syria ====
Western Syria is rich in notable examples of Mesopotamian culture, with contact between Iraq and western Syria dating back to the fourth millennium BCE, during the Expansion of Uruk. The region was of considerable importance to the Mesopotamian Empires owing to its strategic location, and the movement of people and trade between the two regions left a profound cultural and religious impact on both.

During the medieval period, important dynasties such as the Hamdanids and Uqaylids emerged in Upper Iraq and succeeded in bringing extensive parts of Iraq and Syria, extending as far as the Mediterranean, under their rule within a unified political authority that played an important role in the history of the Islamic world. One consequence of this political unity between the two regions was considerable intellectual and literary flourishing, as well as the emergence of the Mosul–Aleppo route as one of the major trade routes of the medieval world.

Many western Syrians adhere to the Alawite faith, which emerged in Iraq in the ninth century and subsequently spread in Syria through the efforts of al-Ḥusayn ibn Ḥamdān al-Khaṣībī. Alawism is generally regarded as a branch of Twelver Shi'ism, which is adhered to by the majority of Iraqis, thereby contributing to strong religious and social ties between the two peoples.

== Religious status ==
Djezirah is one of the four dioceses of the Syriac Orthodox Church. The others are in Aleppo, Homs–Hama and Damascus.

== See also ==
- Assyrian homeland
- Beth Nahrain
- Fertile Crescent
- Geography of Iraq

== Bibliography ==
- Moore, Andrew M. T.; Hillman, Gordon C.; Legge, Anthony J. (2000). Village on the Euphrates: From Foraging to Farming at Abu Hureyra. Oxford: Oxford University Press. ISBN 0-19-510806-X.
- Peter M. M. G. Akkermans; Glenn M. Schwartz (2003). The archaeology of Syria: from complex hunter-gatherers to early urban societies (c. 16,000–300 BC). Cambridge University Press. pp. 72–. ISBN 978-0-521-79666-8. Retrieved 27 June 2011.
- Istakhri, Ibrahim. Al-Masālik wa-al-mamālik, Dār al-Qalam, Cairo, 1961
- Brauer, Ralph W., Boundaries and Frontiers in Medieval Muslim Geography, Philadelphia, 1995
- Ibn Khurradādhbih. Almasalik wal Mamalik, E. J. Brill, Leiden, 1967
- Le Strange, Guy (1905). The Lands of the Eastern Caliphate: Mesopotamia, Persia, and Central Asia, from the Moslem Conquest to the Time of Timur. Cambridge: Cambridge University Press.
- Mohammadi Malayeri, Mohammad. Tārikh o Farhang-i Irān dar Asr-e Enteghaal, Tus, Tehran, 1996
- Morony, Michael G. (1984). Iraq after Muslim conquest. Princeton, N.J: Princeton university press. ISBN 0-691-05395-2.
