= Lazur =

Village in Tehran province, Iran

Lazur Persian: لزور
- Village
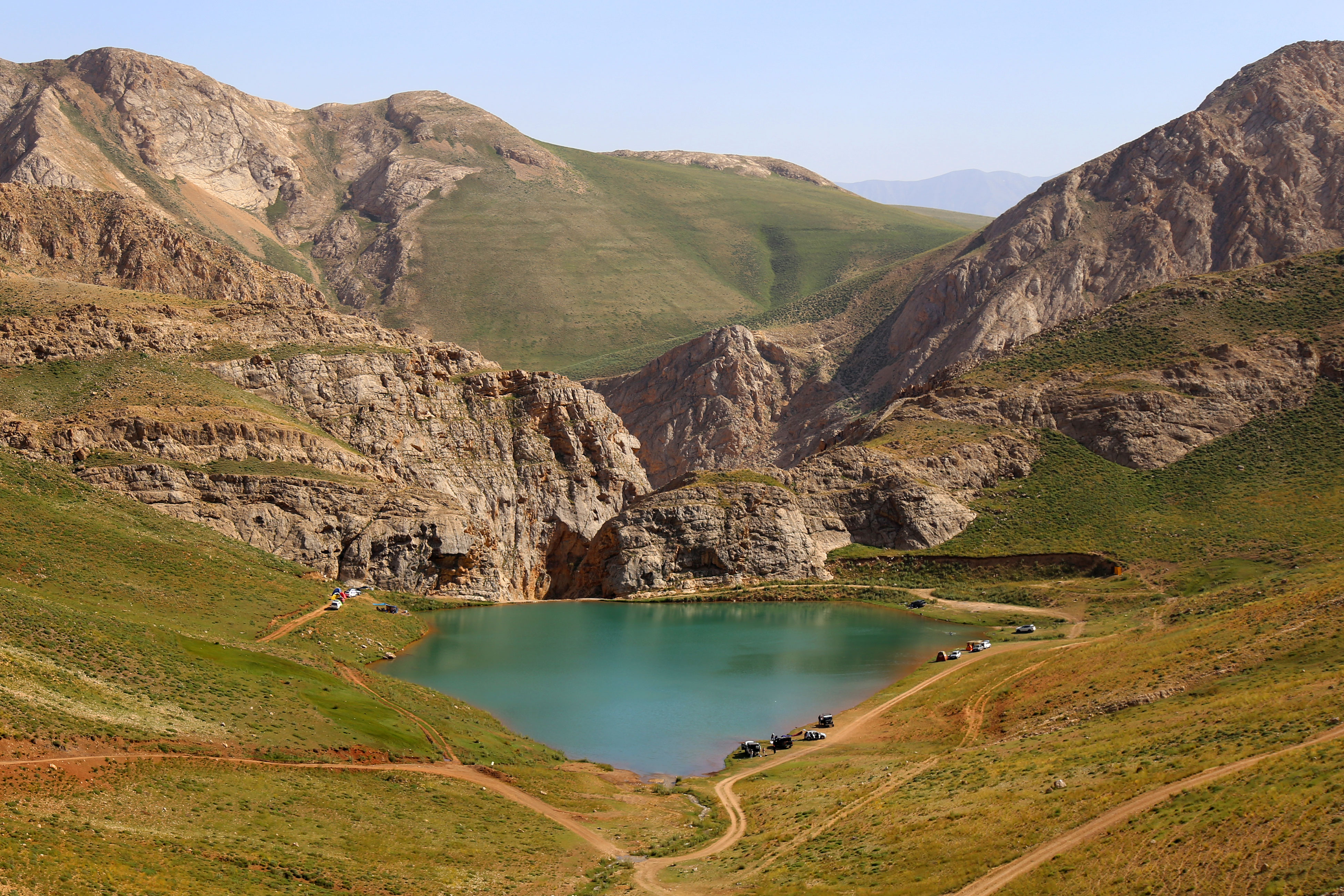
- Lazur Lake, Firuzkuh

- Location within Iran
- Coordinates: 35°52′22″N 52°34′12″E
- Country: Iran
- Province: Tehran
- County: Firuzkuh
- District: Arjomand
- Rural District: Qazqanchay
- Elevation: 2,350 m (7,710 ft)

Population (2016)
  - Total: 1,288
- Time zone: UTC+3:30 (IRST)

Lazur (Persian: لزور) (Note: Also romanized as Lazoor and Lazūr; also known as Lazir, Lazūz, and Lezor) is a village in Qazqanchay Rural District of Arjomand District in Firuzkuh County, Tehran province, Iran.

== Demographics ==
=== Population ===
At the time of the 2006 National Census, the village's population was 2,160 in 521 households. The following census in 2011 counted 965 people in 314 households. The 2016 census measured the population of the village as 1,288 people in 460 households. It was the most populous village in its rural district.
