= Saleh Bon =

Village in Tehran province, Iran

Saleh Bon Persian: سله بن
- Village
- Location within Iran
- Coordinates: 35°46′09″N 52°33′35″E
- Country: Iran
- Province: Tehran
- County: Firuzkuh
- District: Arjomand
- Rural District: Doboluk

Population (2016)
  - Total: 447
- Time zone: UTC+3:30 (IRST)

Saleh Bon (Persian: سله بن) is a village in, and the capital of, Doboluk Rural District in Arjomand District of Firuzkuh County, Tehran province, Iran.

== Demographics ==
=== Population ===
At the time of the 2006 National Census, the village's population was 585 in 186 households. The following census in 2011 counted 361 people in 128 households. The 2016 census measured the population of the village as 447 people in 155 households.
