= Asur, Iran =

Village in Tehran province, Iran

Asur Persian: اسور
- Village
- Location within Iran
- Coordinates: 35°47′07″N 52°25′50″E
- Country: Iran
- Province: Tehran
- County: Firuzkuh
- District: Arjomand
- Rural District: Doboluk
- Elevation: 2,200 m (7,200 ft)

Population (2016)
  - Total: 551
- Time zone: UTC+3:30 (IRST)

Asur (Persian: اسور) (Note: Also romanized as Asoor and Āsūr) is a village in Doboluk Rural District of Arjomand District in Firuzkuh County, Tehran province, Iran.

== Demographics ==
=== Population ===
At the time of the 2006 National Census, the village's population was 766 in 224 households. The following census in 2011 counted 575 people in 192 households. The 2016 census measured the population of the village as 551 people in 191 households. It was the most populous village in its rural district.
