= Shad Mehan =

Village in Tehran province, Iran

Shad Mehan Persian: شادمهن
- Village
- Location within Iran
- Coordinates: 35°49′06″N 52°31′57″E
- Country: Iran
- Province: Tehran
- County: Firuzkuh
- District: Arjomand
- Rural District: Qazqanchay
- Elevation: 2,150 m (7,050 ft)

Population (2016)
  - Total: 189
- Time zone: UTC+3:30 (IRST)

Shad Mehan (Persian: شادمهن) (Note: Also romanized as Shād Mehan and Shādmahan; also known as Shad Jin, Shād Mahand, and Shādīman) is a village in Qazqanchay Rural District of Arjomand District in Firuzkuh County, Tehran province, Iran.

== Demographics ==
=== Population ===
At the time of the 2006 National Census, the village's population was 282 in 78 households. The following census in 2011 counted 197 people in 64 households. The 2016 census measured the population of the village as 189 people in 63 households.
