= Arjomand =

City in Tehran province, Iran

Arjomand Persian: ارجمند
- City
- Location within Iran
- Coordinates: 35°48′50″N 52°30′51″E
- Country: Iran
- Province: Tehran
- County: Firuzkuh
- District: Arjomand
- Established as a city: 2005

Population (2016)
  - Total: 1,124
- Time zone: UTC+3:30 (IRST)

Arjomand (Persian: ارجمند) (Note: Also romanized as Arjmand; also known as Arjomad; formerly Arzaman (اَرزَمان), also romanized as Arzamān) is a city in, and the capital of, Arjomand District in Firuzkuh County, Tehran province, Iran. It also serves as the administrative center for Qazqanchay Rural District. The village of Arjomand was converted to a city in 2005.

== Demographics ==
=== Population ===
At the time of the 2006 National Census, the city's population was 1,688 in 474 households. The following census in 2011 counted 1,114 people in 385 households. The 2016 census measured the population of the city as 1,124 people in 406 households.
