= Qazqanchay Rural District =

Rural district in Tehran province, Iran

Qazqanchay Rural District Persian: دهستان قزقانچائ
- Rural District
- Location within Iran
- Coordinates: 35°52′N 52°29′E
- Country: Iran
- Province: Tehran
- County: Firuzkuh
- District: Arjomand
- Established: 1987
- Capital: Arjomand

Population (2016)
  - Total: 1,903
- Time zone: UTC+3:30 (IRST)

Qazqanchay Rural District (Persian: دهستان قزقانچائ) is in Arjomand District of Firuzkuh County, Tehran province, Iran. It is administered from the city of Arjomand.

== Demographics ==
=== Population ===
At the time of the 2006 National Census, the rural district's population was 2,931 in 724 households. There were 1,563 inhabitants in 491 households at the following census of 2011. The 2016 census measured the population of the rural district as 1,903 in 666 households. The most populous of its six villages was Lazur, with 1,288 people.

=== Other villages in the rural district ===
- Ahnaz
- Bahanak
- Shad Mehan
