= Siirt University =

Public university in Siirt, Turkey

- Established: 2007
- Location: Siirt, Turkey
- Website: Official website

Siirt University (Turkish:Siirt Üniversitesi) is a university located in Siirt, Turkey. It was established in 2007.
