= Siirt Atatürk Stadium =

Multi-purpose stadium in Siirt, Turkey

Coordinates: 37°55′44″N 41°56′15″E

- Interactive map of Siirt Atatürk Stadium
- Location: Siirt, Turkey
- Capacity: 5,650
- Surface: Turf

Construction
- Opened: 1969

Tenant
- Siirtspor

Siirt Atatürk Stadium is a multi-purpose stadium in Siirt, Turkey. It is currently used mostly for football matches and is the home ground of Siirtspor. The stadium was built in 1969 and currently holds 7000 people. With the promotion of Siirtspor to the Turkish Süper Lig at the end of the 1999–2000 season, the stadium was approved and expanded.
