= 2018 Siirt raid =

Armed raid of the PKK in Turkey

Siirt raid
- Part of Kurdish–Turkish conflict (2015–present)
Date	29 March 2018
Location	Eruh, Siirt, Turkey

Belligerents
Turkey	Kurdistan Workers' Party (PKK)

Casualties and losses
7 killed (1 died of wounds); 6 wounded	3 killed

The Siirt raid was an armed raid of the Kurdistan Workers' Party (PKK) on a Turkish military base in Eruh, Siirt province, Turkey, on 29 March 2018. The raid killed six village guard militia that was supporting the Turkish army in the area. Seven soldiers were injured, one of whom, Sergeant Emre Dut, later died of his wounds. The PKK had no casualties. After the attack, Turkish forces launched an operation, killing three PKK militants they claimed were responsible for the raid.
