= 2015 Siirt bombing =

Bombing in Siirt Province, Turkey

- Site of the attack
- Location: Şirvan - Pervari road, Siirt Province, Turkey
- Date: 19 August 2015; 14:10 (EEST)
- Deaths: 8
- Injuries: 1
- Perpetrator: Kurdistan Workers' Party (Turkish claim)

2015 Siirt bombing was a bombing targeting an armoured vehicle with personnels of Turkish Gendarmerie in it in Şirvan - Pervari road of Siirt Province on 19 August 2015, around 14:10 with a bomb that was placed on the road several hours before the detonation. 8 people died and 1 was injured as a result of the attack. No one has claimed responsibility, but Turkish government has blamed Kurdistan Workers' Party (PKK) for the attack.
