= Doboluk Rural District =

Rural district in Tehran province, Iran

Doboluk Rural District Persian: دهستان دوبلوك
- Rural District
- Location within Iran
- Coordinates: 35°46′N 52°26′E
- Country: Iran
- Province: Tehran
- County: Firuzkuh
- District: Arjomand
- Established: 2001
- Capital: Saleh Bon

Population (2016)
  - Total: 3,475
- Time zone: UTC+3:30 (IRST)

Doboluk Rural District (Persian: دهستان دوبلوك) is in Arjomand District of Firuzkuh County, Tehran province, Iran. Its capital is the village of Saleh Bon.

== Demographics ==
=== Population ===
At the time of the 2006 National Census, the rural district's population was 3,761 in 1,111 households. There were 3,676 inhabitants in 1,244 households at the following census of 2011. The 2016 census measured the population of the rural district as 3,475 in 1,210 households. The most populous of its 12 villages was Asur, with 551 people.

=== Other villages in the rural district ===
- Andariyeh
- Bahan
- Najafdar
- Varskhowran
- Veshtan
