= Siirt =

Provincial capital in Turkey

- Municipality
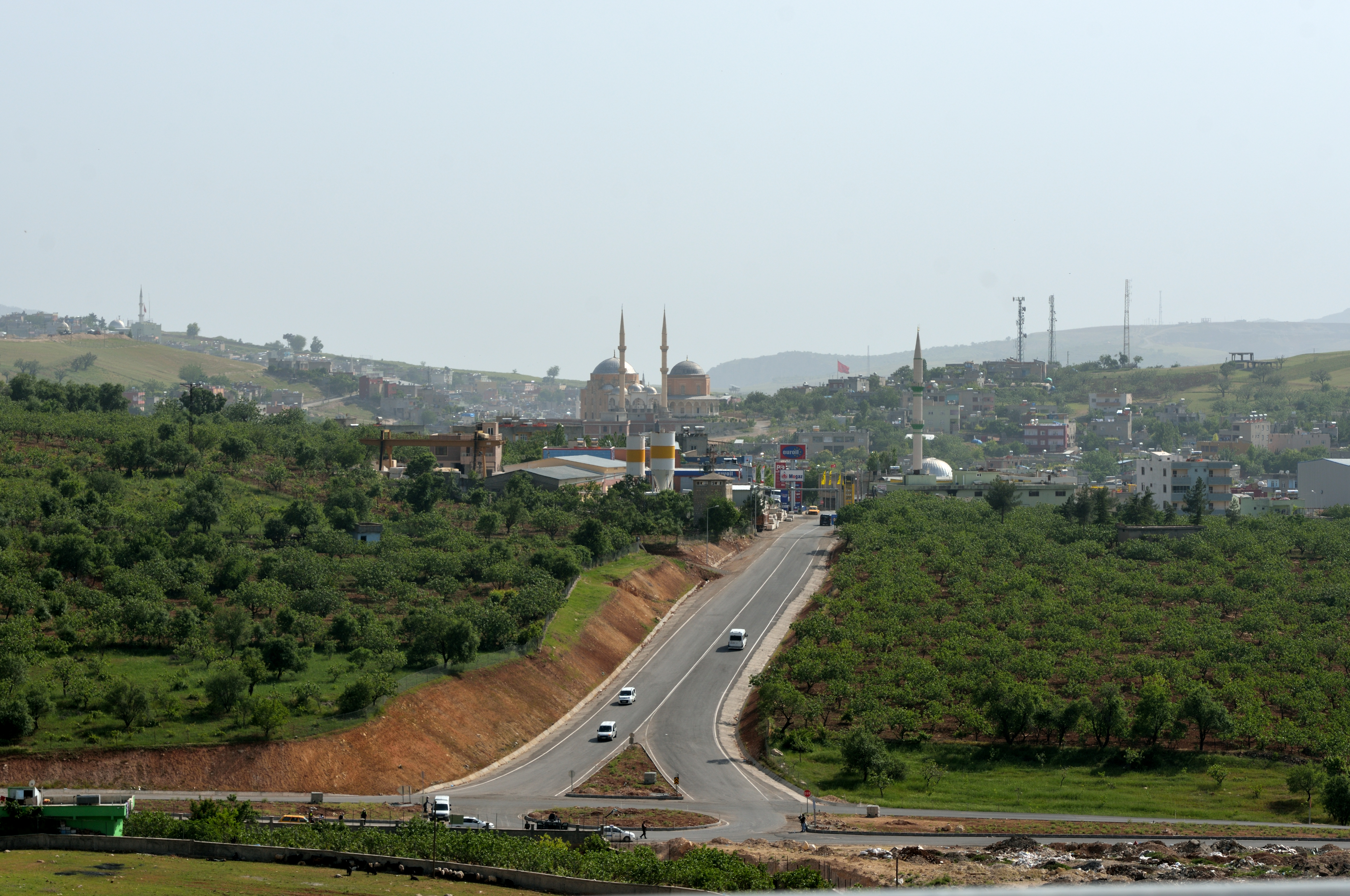
- View of Siirt

- Coat of arms

- Location within Turkey
- Coordinates: 37°55′30″N 41°56′45″E
- Country: Turkey
- Province: Siirt
- District: Siirt

Government
  - Mayor: Dr. Kemal Kızılkaya (acting)
- Population (2021): 160,340
- Time zone: UTC+3 (TRT)
- Website: www.siirt.bel.tr

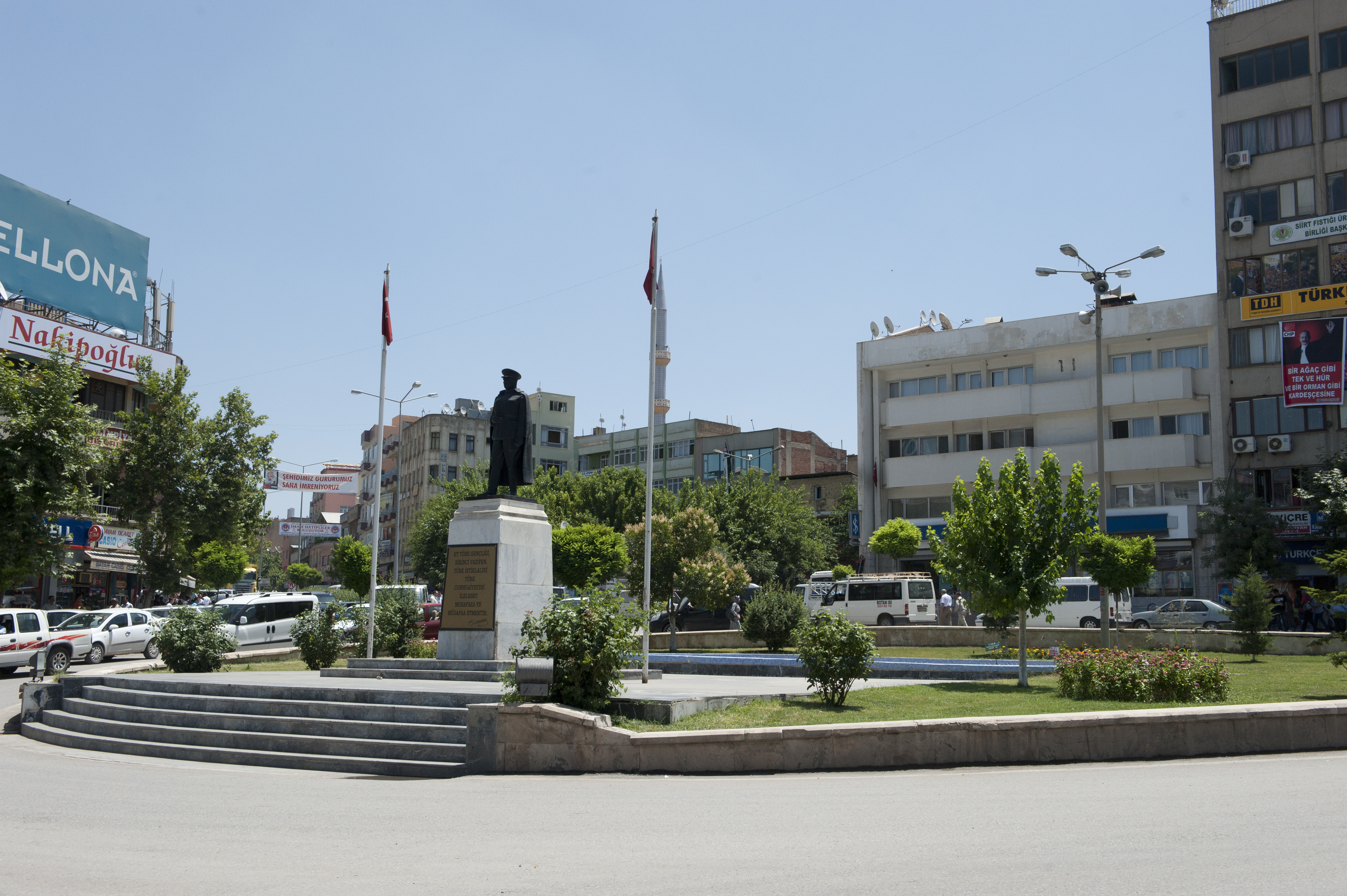
City centre

Siirt (Kurdish: سێرت, romanized: Sêrt; Arabic: سِعِرْد, romanized: Si'ird; Armenian: Սղերդ, romanized: Sġerd; Syriac: ܣܥܪܬ, romanized: Siirt;) is a city in the Siirt District of Siirt Province in Turkey. It had a population of 160,340 in 2021. The city is predominantly inhabited by Kurds.

The city is divided into the neighborhoods of Afetevlerı, Alan, Algul, Bahçelievler, Barış, Batı, Conkbayır, Çal, Doğan, Dumlupınar, Halenze, İnönü, Karakol, Kooperatif, Sakarya, Tınaztepe, Ulus, Ülkü, Veysel Karani and Yeni.

== History ==
=== Pre-Islamic ===
Previously known as Saird, in pre-Islamic times Siirt was a diocese of the Eastern Orthodox Church (Sirte, Σίρτη in Byzantine Greek). In the medieval times, Arzen was the main city and it competed with Hasankeyf over the control the region, Siirt was only to become a center of the region in the 14th century. But it was still dependent from Hasankeyf until the 17th century. An illuminated manuscript known as the Syriac Bible of Paris might have originated from the Bishop of Siirt's library, Siirt's Christians would have worshipped in Syriac, a liturgical language descended from Aramaic still in use by the Syriac Rite, Chaldean Rite, other Eastern Christians in India, and the Nestorians along the Silk Road as far as China. The Chronicle of Seert was preserved in the city; it describes the ecclesiastical history of the Persian realm through to the middle of the seventh century.

=== Modern times ===
From 1858 to 1915 the city was the seat of a bishop of the Chaldean Catholic Church. Most of the city's Assyrians, including Addai Scher their archbishop were murdered during the Assyrian genocide along with the loss of artefacts such as the Syriac manuscript of Theodore of Mopsuestia's De Incarnatione. Also during World War I, the Armenian population of Siirt became a victim of the Armenian genocide.

==== Kurdish-Turkish conflict ====
Kurdish regions such as Siirt have been under martial law for most periods since 1927 and were included in the OHAL (state of emergency) zone in 1983, prior to the start of the PKK’s armed campaign. During the early stages of the Kurdish–Turkish conflict in the 1990s, former Turkish President Turgut Özal advocated transforming cities like Siirt into “centers of attraction” for the rural Kurdish population, while simultaneously supporting the eviction and destruction of Kurdish villages and hamlets in the surrounding mountains through military operations and dam construction projects.

In wake of the 2014 Kobanî protests, which were part of the broader third phase of the Kurdish–Turkish conflict, local Kurdish youth and activists organized popular protests in the city of Siirt, which led to the death of several protestors due to excessive police violence. The conflict later escalated into a full-scale military confrontation in the city between what the Turkish government described as “PKK and YDG-H militants” and Turkish security forces. This escalation involved the imposition of curfews and the deployment of the Turkish army throughout the area, which was described as a siege by pro-Kurdish media. During the conflict, Turkish forces were targeted in multiple incidents, including the 2015 Siirt bombing, a roadside explosion on a highway near Siirt city in July 2016, rocket attacks in the Cumhuriyet neighborhood, bombings in 2018, the 2018 Siirt raid, and several other attacks, resulting in numerous deaths and injuries.

== Demographics ==
=== Historical ===
Mark Sykes recorded Siirt as a city inhabited by Kurds, Arabs, Assyrians, and Armenians. During the second half of the 19th century, many Armenians left Siirt due to persecutions and poor economic conditions. During the 1895 Hamidian massacres, many Armenians were forcibly converted to Islam and the clergy was massacred. Before World War I, the sanjak of Siirt formed a Christian enclave with 60,000 Christians: 25,000 Armenians, 20,000 Syriac Orthodox, and 15,000 Chaldean Catholics. According to the Armenian Patriarchate of Constantinople, in 1914 there were 4,437 Armenians in the kaza, with three churches, one monastery and two schools. Agha Petros mentions 40 Nestorian Assyrian families in the city of Siirt. Mardin Chaldean priest Joseph Tfinkdji lists 5,430 Chaldeans in the diocese: 824 in the town and the rest in surrounding villages. The community was led by Addai Sher. David Gaunt mentions some Yezidi presence.

Mother tongue composition of the city proper of Siirt in 1927 according to Turkish census
Languages	Speakers	%
Arabic	10,498	69.5
Turkish	3,621	24.0
Kurdish	973	6.5
Other	7	0.0
Total	15,099	100

According to the 1927 census, the population in the whole district was almost exclusively Muslim, with the exception of two Catholics, one Protestant, four Armenians, 17 other Christians, and 38 "other religion".

İsmet İnönü referred to the city as an Arab city eager to get Turkified, while Kurds lived in the outskirts.

=== Modern times ===
Kurds constitute a majority in the city with a significant Arab community. The Kurdish tribes living in the city are the Botikan, Dudêran, Elîkan, Keşkoliyan, Silokan and Sturkiyan.

== Government ==
In the municipal elections of March 2019 Berivan Helen Işık of the Peoples' Democratic Party (HDP) was elected mayor. She was dismissed from her post on 15 May 2020 and detained over terror charges. Ali Fuat Atik, the Governor of the Siirt province was appointed trustee by the Ministry of the Interior.

On January 29, 2025, another elected mayor from the pro-Kurdish DEM party was removed from office due to "convictions on terrorism-related offenses", according to the Interior Ministry, and was replaced by a state official.

== Trivia ==
Siirt was Turkish Prime Minister Recep Tayyip Erdoğan's constituency from 2003 to 2007. His wife, Mrs. Emine Erdoğan, is from Siirt and the PM had been elected to the Turkish Grand National Assembly in a by-election held in Siirt in 2003.

Although Siirt remains one of the poorer cities in Turkey, some neighbourhoods have fine and modern housing including new shops, banks and hotels.

== Climate ==
Siirt has a hot-summer Mediterranean climate (Köppen: Csa, Trewartha: Cs) with very hot, dry summers and chilly, wet winters. During winter months there is frequent frost and occasional snowfall.

Climate data for Siirt (1991–2020, extremes 1939–2022)
Month	Jan	Feb	Mar	Apr	May	Jun	Jul	Aug	Sep	Oct	Nov	Dec	Year
Record high °C (°F)	19.7 (67.5)	20.6 (69.1)	28.5 (83.3)	32.9 (91.2)	36.2 (97.2)	40.2 (104.4)	44.4 (111.9)	46.0 (114.8)	41.3 (106.3)	36.6 (97.9)	25.8 (78.4)	24.3 (75.7)	46.0 (114.8)
Mean daily maximum °C (°F)	7.3 (45.1)	9.3 (48.7)	14.2 (57.6)	19.7 (67.5)	25.7 (78.3)	32.8 (91.0)	37.5 (99.5)	37.6 (99.7)	32.6 (90.7)	25.2 (77.4)	15.7 (60.3)	9.1 (48.4)	22.2 (72.0)
Daily mean °C (°F)	3.3 (37.9)	4.7 (40.5)	9.2 (48.6)	14.3 (57.7)	19.8 (67.6)	26.5 (79.7)	30.9 (87.6)	30.9 (87.6)	25.8 (78.4)	18.9 (66.0)	10.6 (51.1)	5.1 (41.2)	16.7 (62.1)
Mean daily minimum °C (°F)	0.4 (32.7)	1.2 (34.2)	5.1 (41.2)	9.7 (49.5)	14.3 (57.7)	20.1 (68.2)	24.1 (75.4)	24.1 (75.4)	19.4 (66.9)	13.7 (56.7)	6.8 (44.2)	2.3 (36.1)	11.8 (53.2)
Record low °C (°F)	−19.3 (−2.7)	−16.5 (2.3)	−13.3 (8.1)	−4.1 (24.6)	2.0 (35.6)	8.2 (46.8)	13.1 (55.6)	14.4 (57.9)	8.5 (47.3)	0.3 (32.5)	−6.6 (20.1)	−14.6 (5.7)	−19.3 (−2.7)
Average precipitation mm (inches)	81.0 (3.19)	98.6 (3.88)	115.2 (4.54)	102.2 (4.02)	63.9 (2.52)	9.7 (0.38)	3.8 (0.15)	2.2 (0.09)	7.9 (0.31)	49.1 (1.93)	76.8 (3.02)	90.3 (3.56)	700.7 (27.59)
Average precipitation days	12.73	12.53	14.83	14.07	11.33	4.13	1.53	1.00	2.47	8.77	9.07	11.90	104.4
Average snowy days	4	3.6	1.3	0	0	0	0	0	0	0	0.3	2	11.2
Average relative humidity (%)	72.6	67.5	61.6	58	50.2	33.8	27.3	26.1	31.8	47.1	62.9	72.2	50.9
Mean monthly sunshine hours	107.3	120.7	162.9	192.1	263.5	331.1	356.8	332.3	284.7	217.5	154.6	104.2	2,627.9
Mean daily sunshine hours	3.5	4.3	5.3	6.4	8.5	11.1	11.5	10.7	9.5	7.0	5.2	3.4	7.2
Source 1: Turkish State Meteorological Service
Source 2: NOAA(humidity, sun 1991-2020), Meteomanz(snow days 2000-2023)

== Notable people ==
- Addai Sher, Chaldean Catholic archbishop of Siirt in Upper Mesopotamia was martyred in Siirt in 1915 during the 1915 Assyrian genocide
- Mehmet Güney (1936*), Diplomat and judge
- Archbishop Vicken Aykazian (1951*), Diocesan Legate and Ecumenical Director for the Eastern Diocese of the Armenian Apostolic Church of America.
- Coşkun Aral (1956*), correspondent, photo journalist, television journalist and documentary film producer.
- Ethem Sancak (1958*), Businessmen
- Yasin Aktay (1966*), Chairman of Justice and Development Party in Turkey
- Hasan Özer (1974*), footballer and manager
- Kerem Gürgen (1983*), boxer
- Evin Demirhan Yavuz (1995*), freestyle wrestler

== Gallery ==
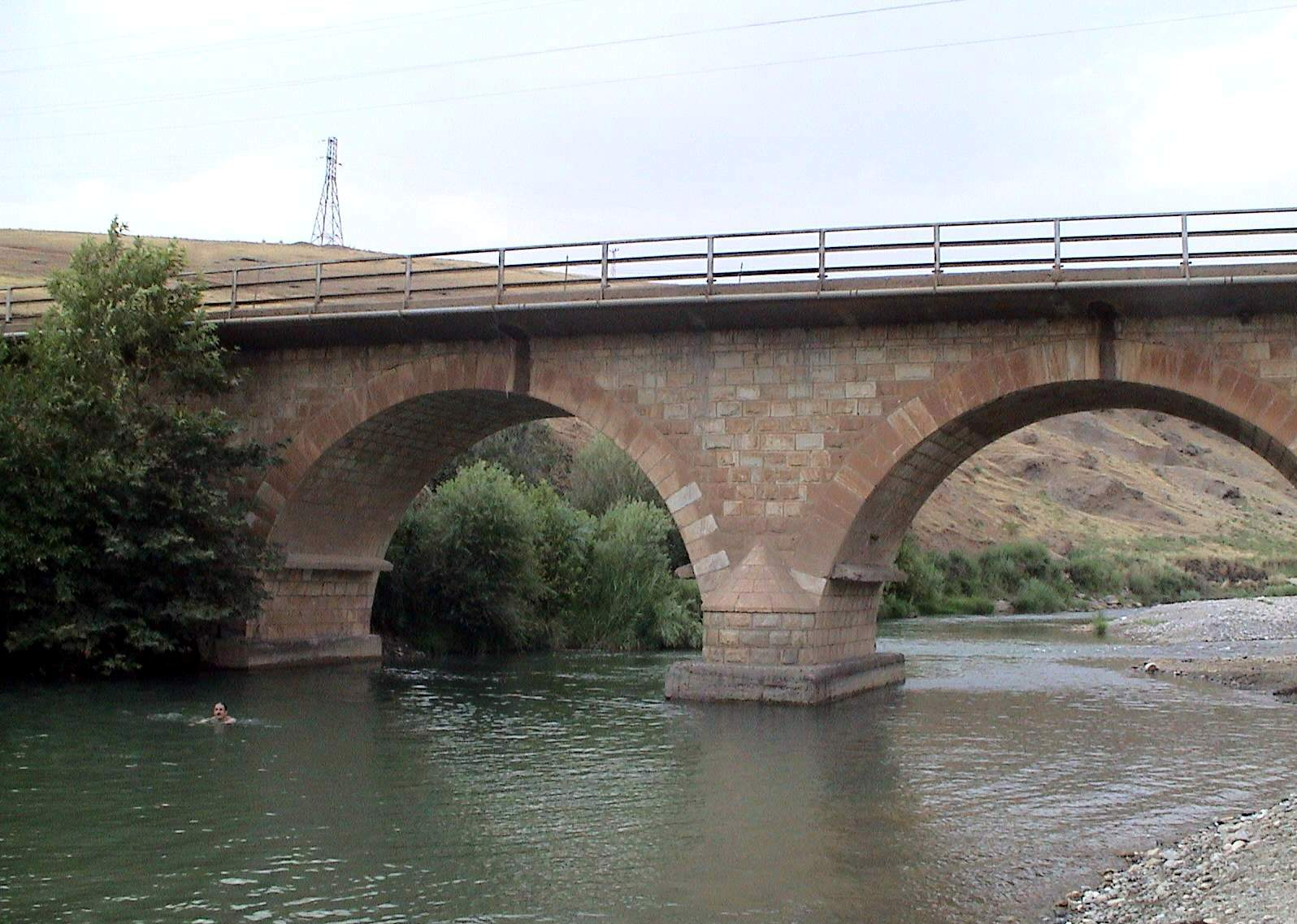
A bridge in Siirt

Ebul Vefa Mosque

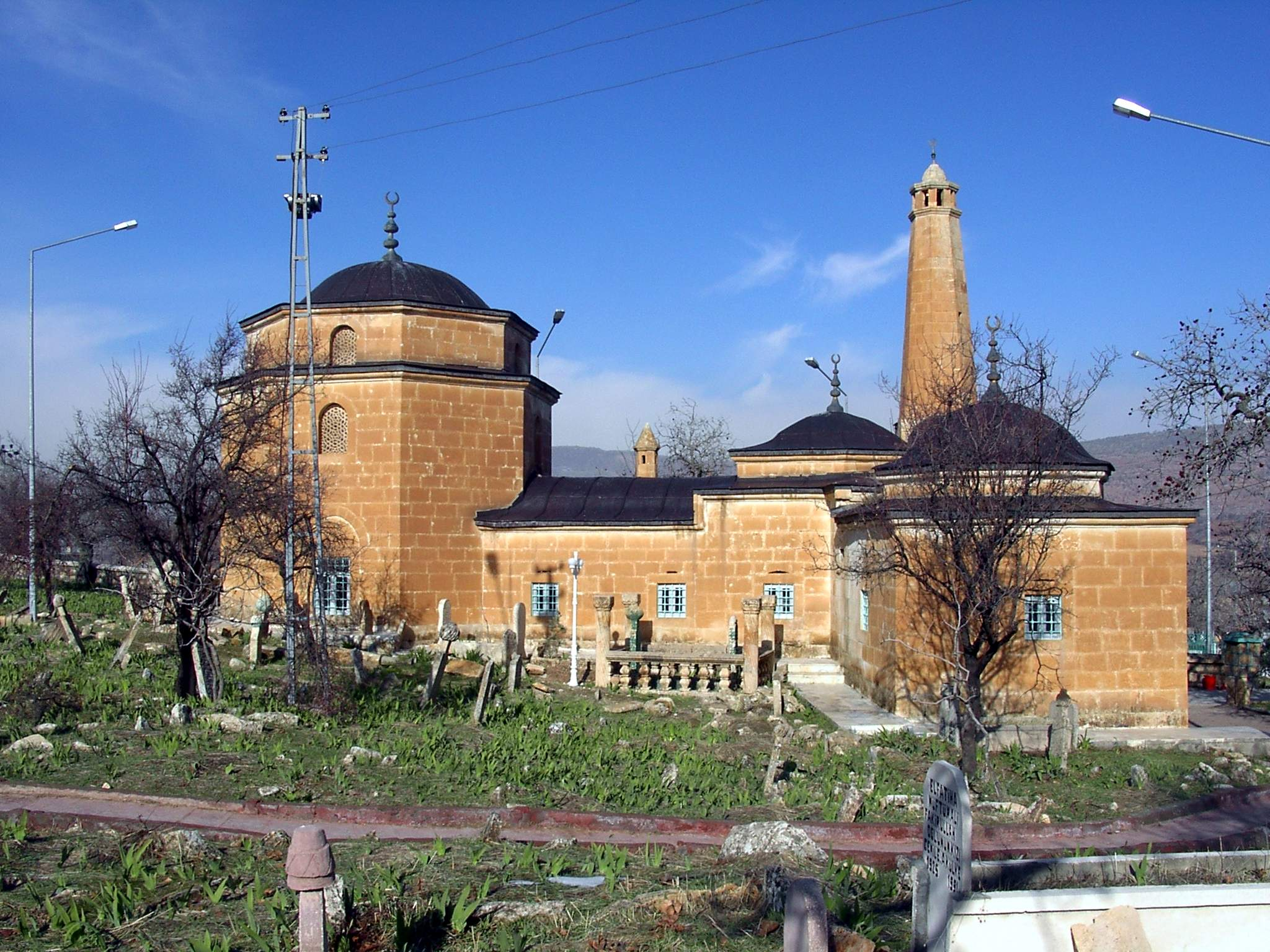
Ibrahim hakkı shrine in Siirt Tillo

The city hall

Siirt Tillo

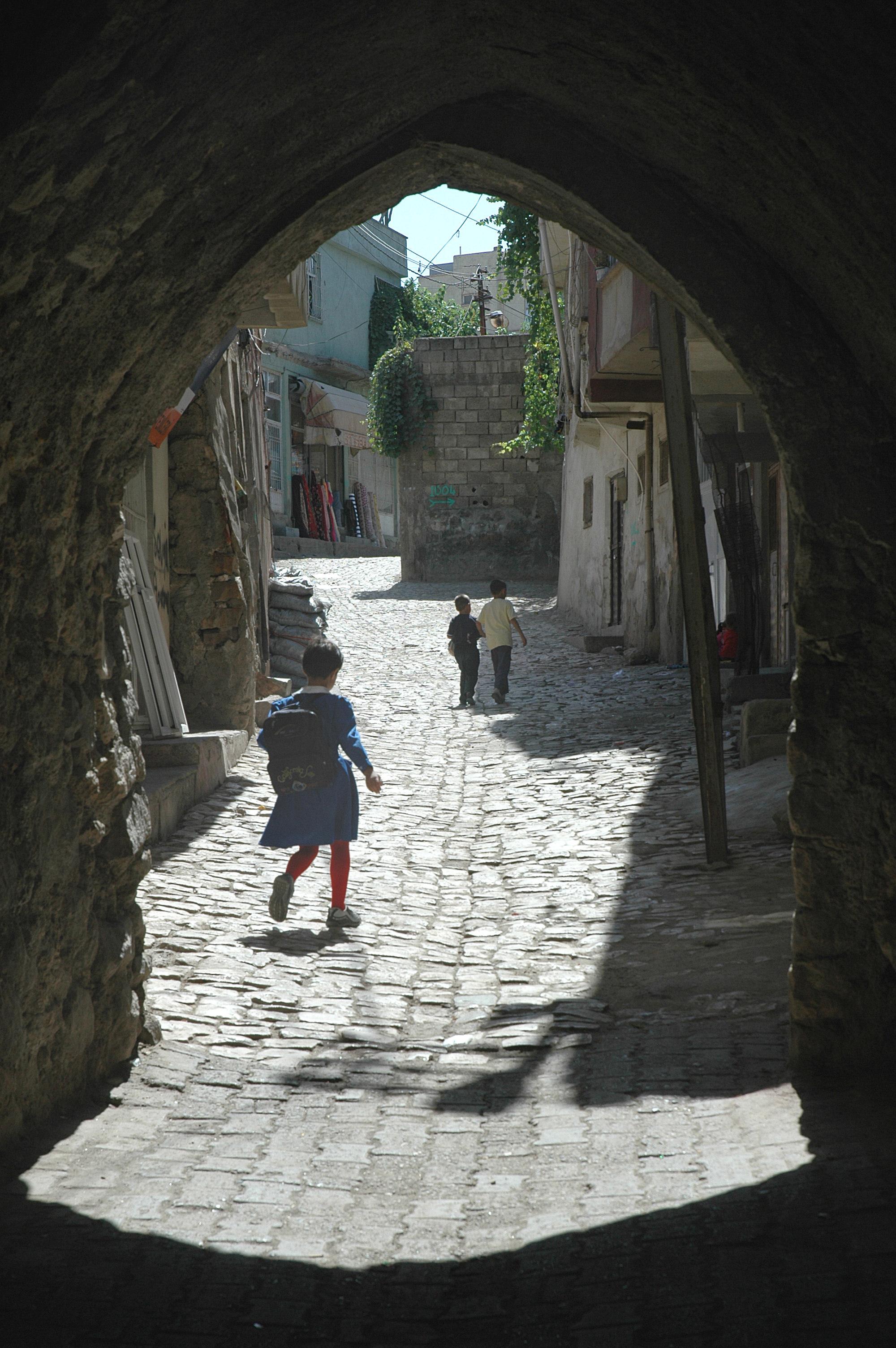
Siirt Street scene

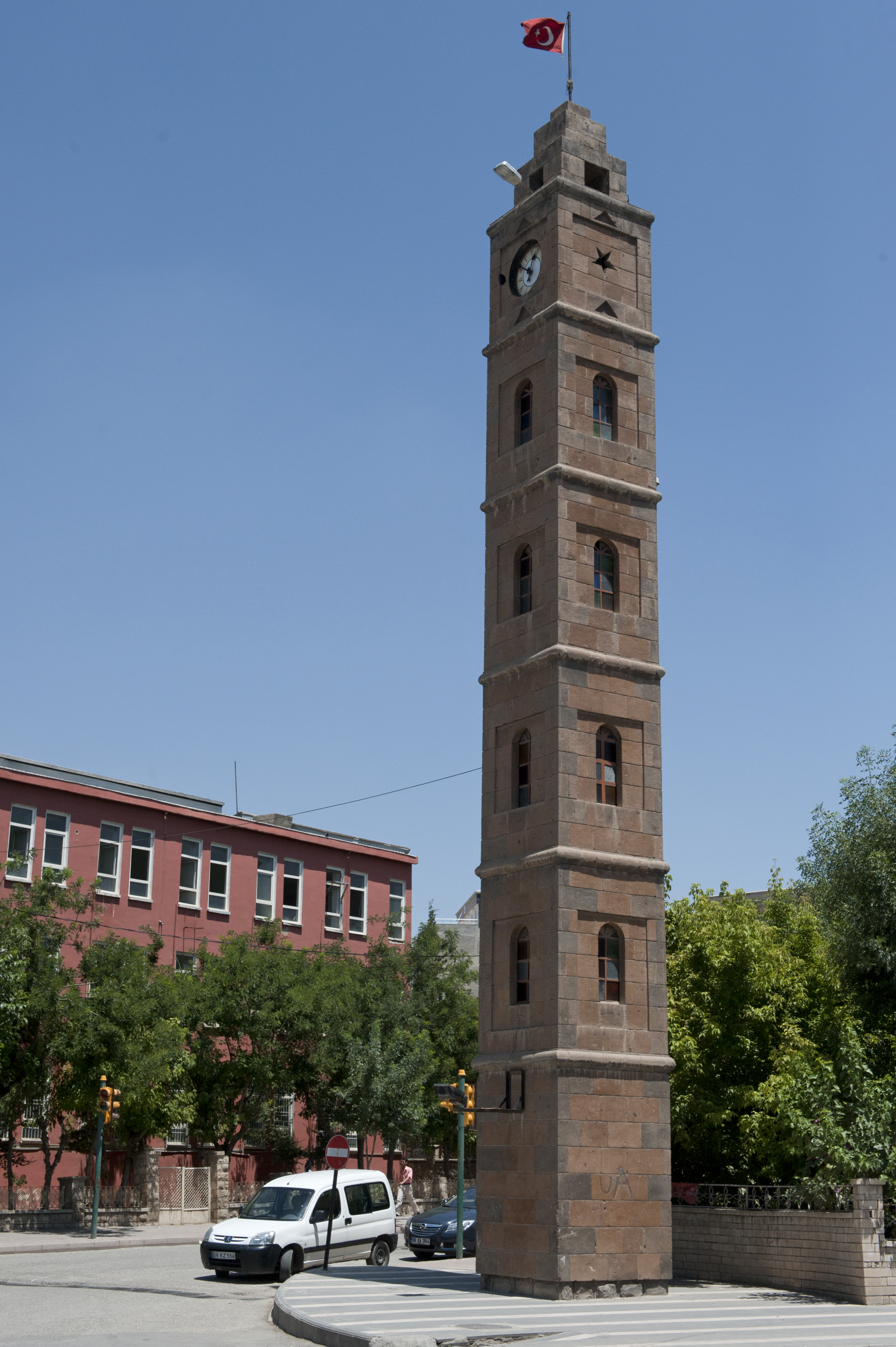
Siirt Saat Kulesi

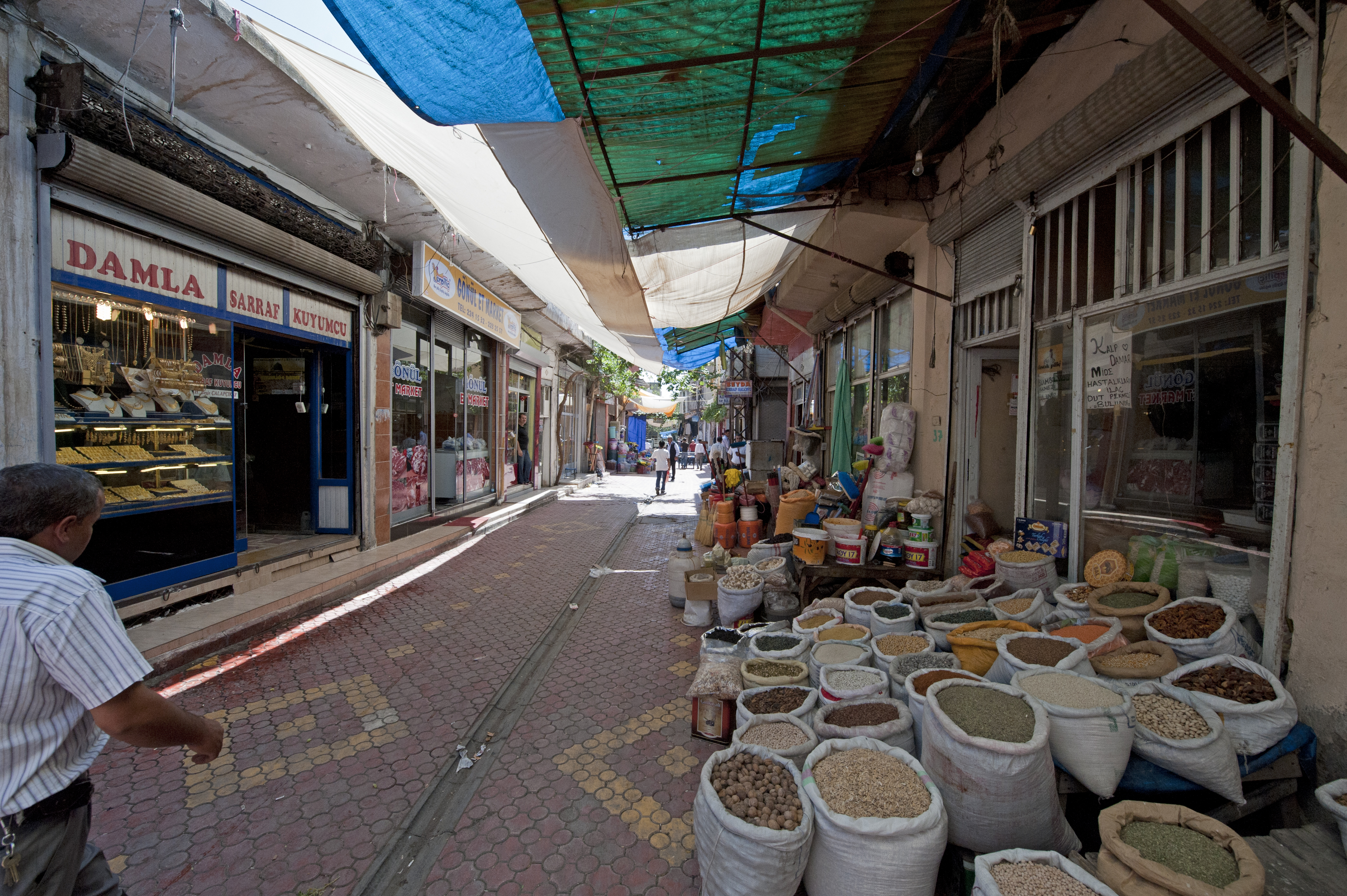
Siirt Market area

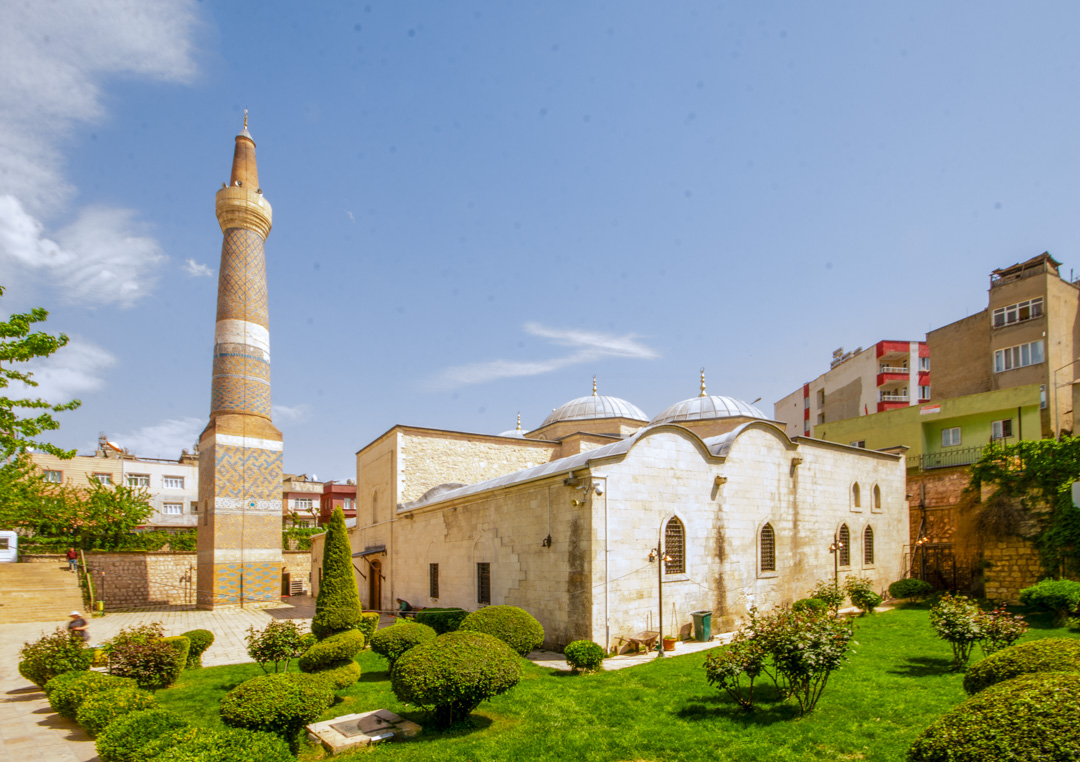
Siirt Ulu Camii side view

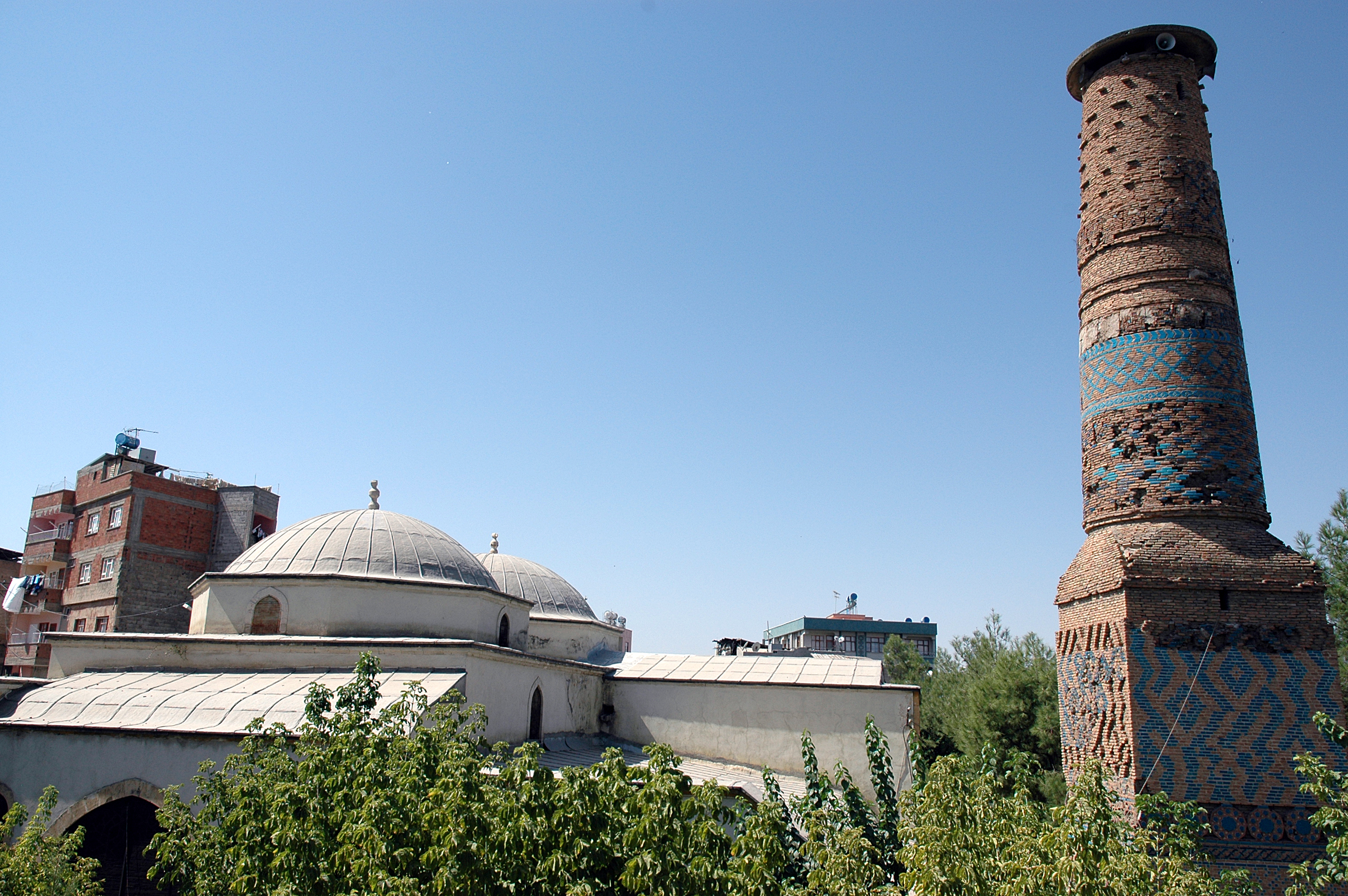
Siirt Ulu Camii

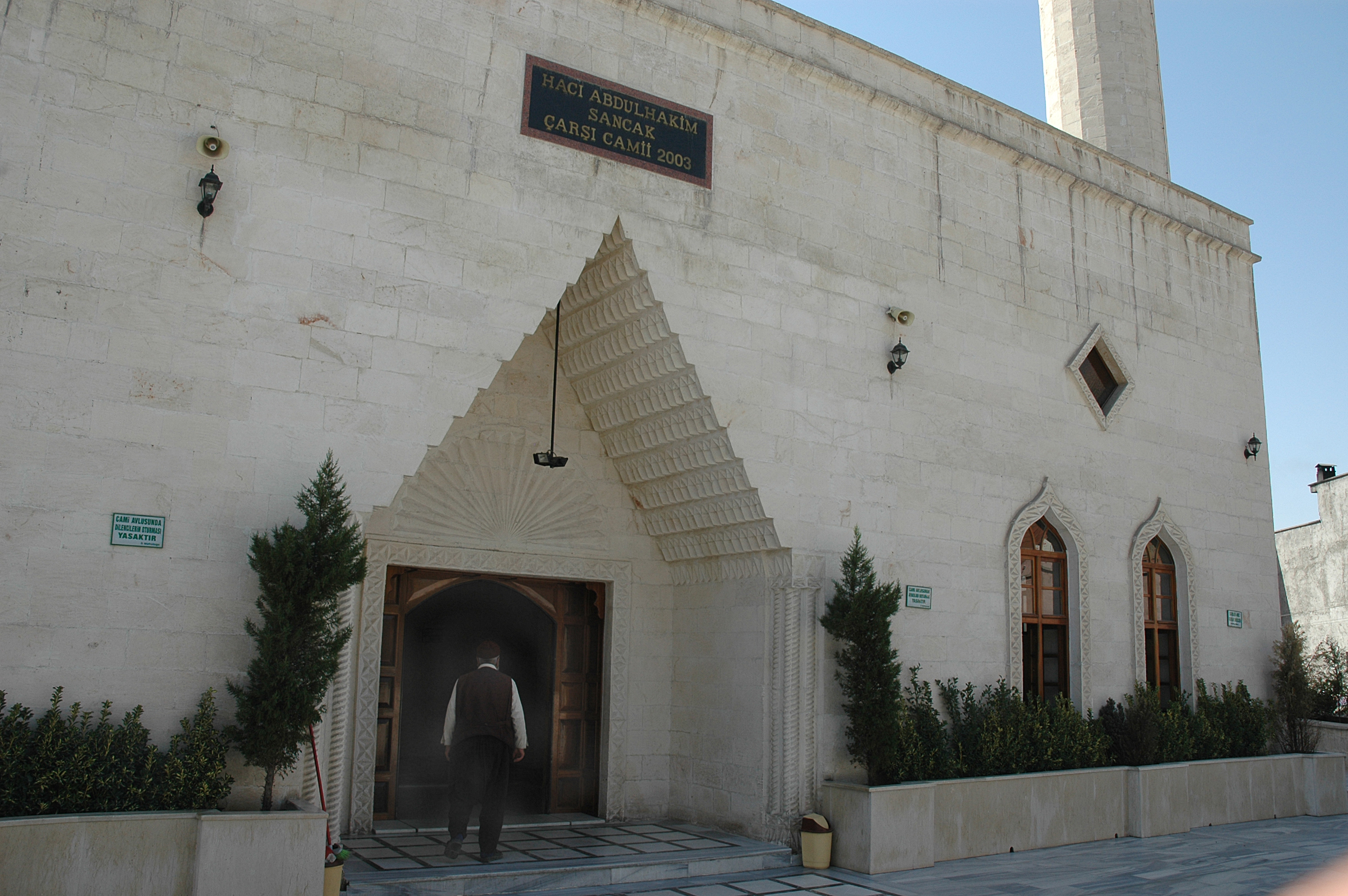
Hacı Abdulhakim Sancak Çarşı Camii

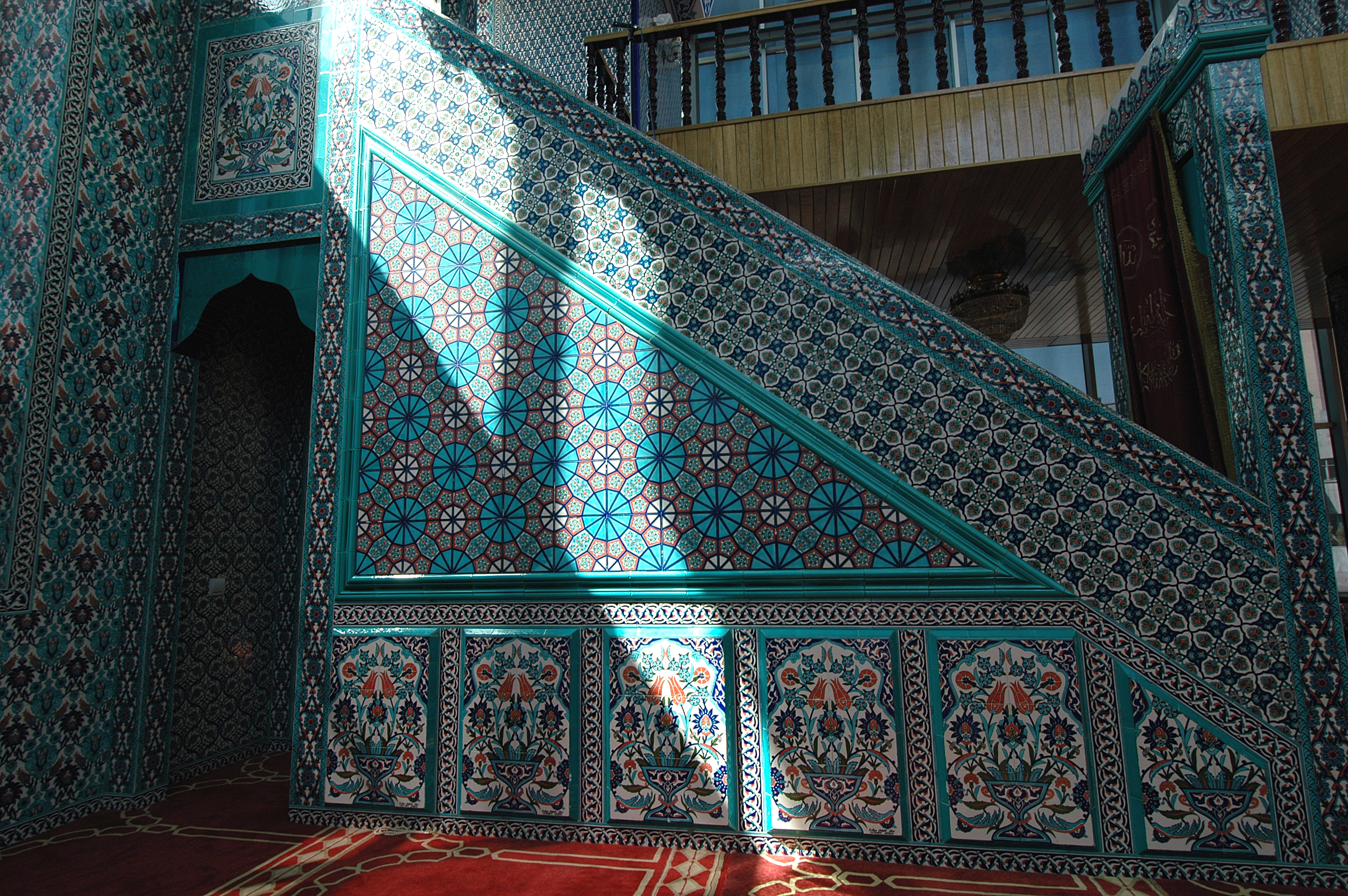
Hacı Abdulhakim Sancak Çarşı Camii Minber
