= Arjomand District =

District in Tehran province, Iran

Arjomand District Persian: بخش ارجمند
- District
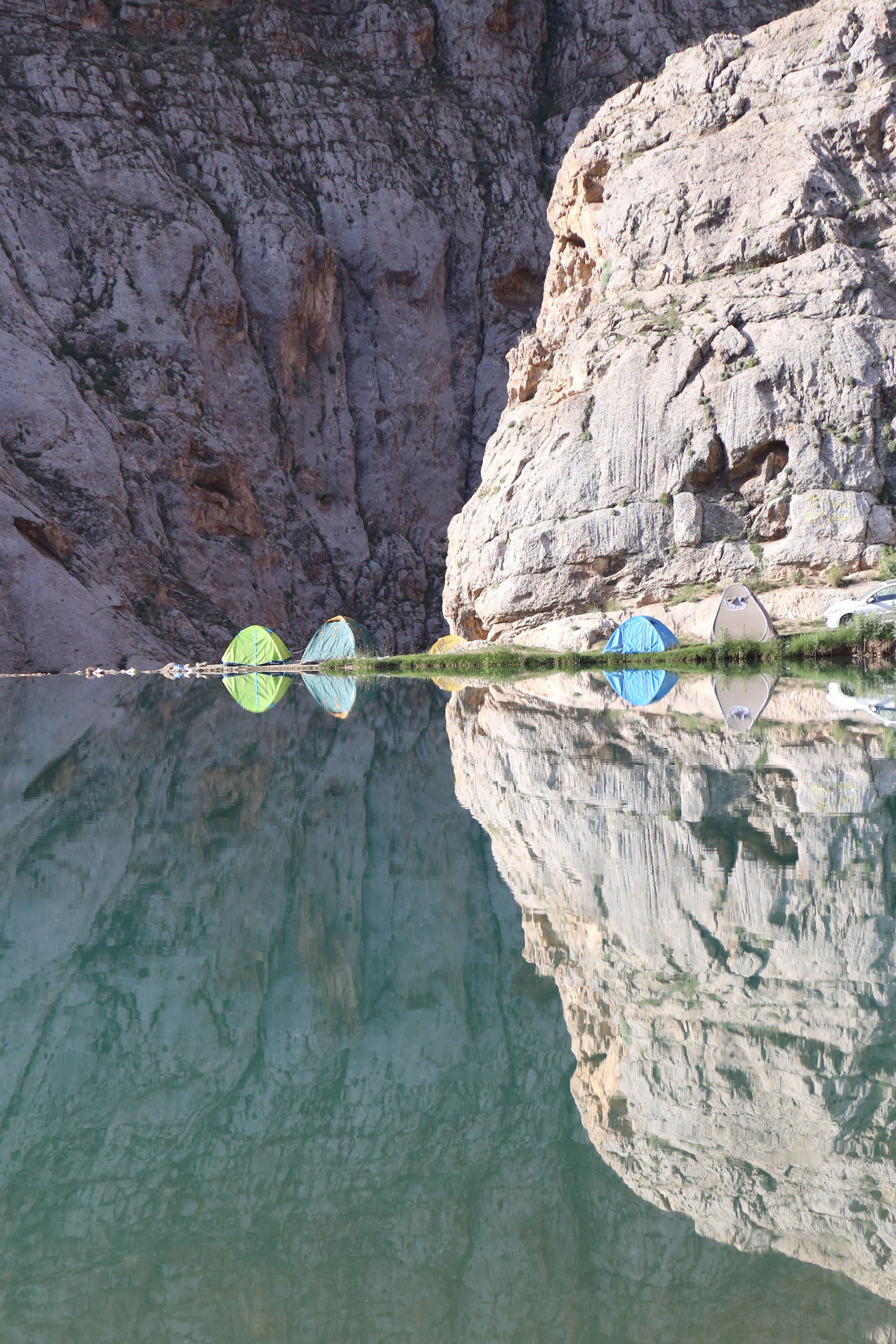
- Lazur Lake, Firuzkuh

- Location within Iran
- Coordinates: 35°50′N 52°27′E
- Country: Iran
- Province: Tehran
- County: Firuzkuh
- Established: 1996
- Capital: Arjomand

Population (2016)
  - Total: 6,502
- Time zone: UTC+3:30 (IRST)

Arjomand District (Persian: بخش ارجمند) is in Firuzkuh County, Tehran province, Iran. Its capital is the city of Arjomand.

== Demographics ==
=== Population ===
At the time of the 2006 National Census, the district's population was 8,380 in 2,309 households. The following census in 2011 counted 6,353 people in 2,120 households. The 2016 census measured the population of the district as 6,502 inhabitants in 2,282 households.

=== Administrative divisions ===
Arjomand District Population
Administrative Divisions	2006	2011	2016
Doboluk RD	3,761	3,676	3,475
Qazqanchay RD	2,931	1,563	1,903
Arjomand (city)	1,688	1,114	1,124
Total	8,380	6,353	6,502
RD = Rural District
