= List of populated places in Siirt Province =

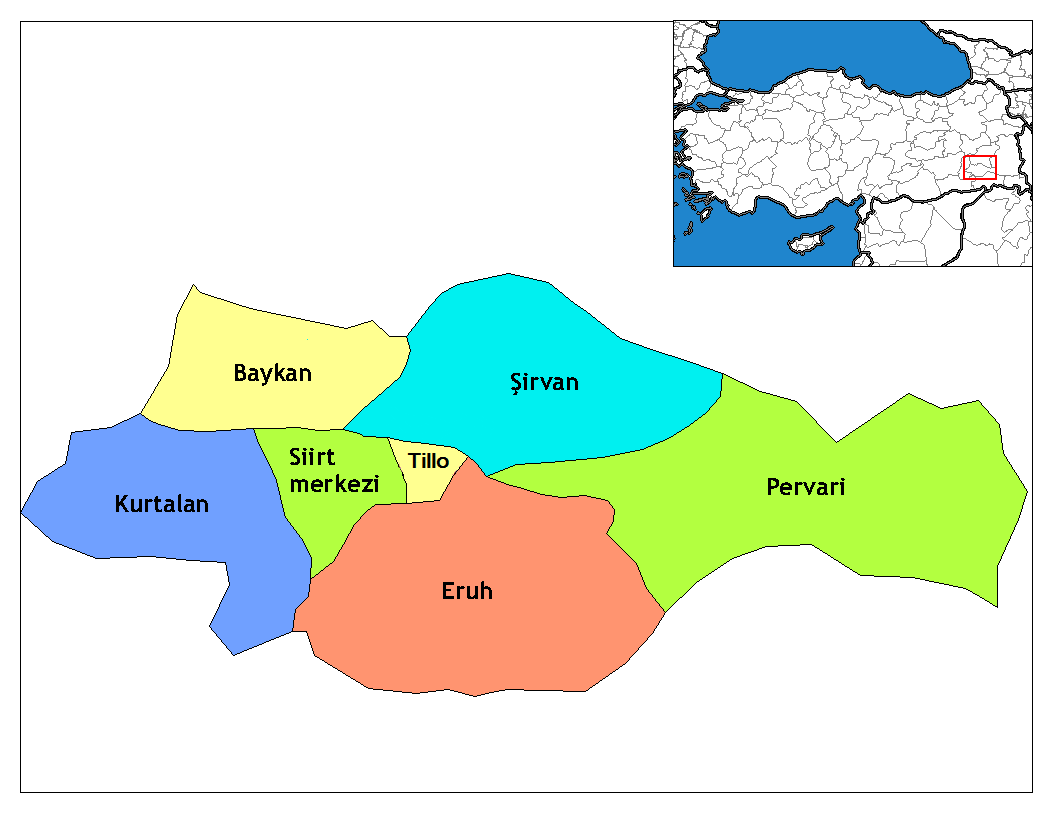
Siirt Province

Below is the list of populated places in Siirt Province, Turkey by the districts. In the following lists first place in each list is the administrative center of the district.

== Siirt ==
- Siirt
- Akdoğmuş, Siirt
- Aktaş, Siirt
- Akyamaç, Siirt
- Beşyol, Siirt
- Bostancık, Siirt
- Çöl, Siirt
- Demirkaya, Siirt
- Doluharman, Siirt
- Eğlence, Siirt
- Ekmekçiler, Siirt
- Gökçebağ, Siirt
- Güneşli, Siirt
- İnkapı, Siirt
- Kalender, Siirt
- Kayaboğaz, Siirt
- Kayıklı, Siirt
- Kelekçi, Siirt
- Kışlacık, Siirt
- Koçlu, Siirt
- Konacık, Siirt
- Köprübaşı, Siirt
- Meşelidere, Siirt
- Meydandere, Siirt
- Pınarca, Siirt
- Pınarova, Siirt
- Sağırsu, Siirt
- Sağlarca, Siirt
- Sarıtepe, Siirt
- Tuzkuyusu, Siirt
- Yağmurtepe, Siirt
- Yazlıca, Siirt
- Yerlibahçe, Siirt
- Yokuşbağları, Siirt

== Aydınlar ==
- Aydınlar
- Akyayla, Aydınlar
- Çatılı, Aydınlar
- Çınarlısu, Aydınlar
- Dereyamaç, Aydınlar
- İkizbağlar, Aydınlar
- Taşbalta, Aydınlar

== Baykan ==
- Baykan
- Adakale, Baykanl
- Ardıçdalı, Baykanl
- Atabağı, Baykanl
- Çamtaşı, Baykanl
- Çaykaya, Baykanl
- Çelikli, Baykanl
- Çevrimtepe, Baykanl
- Çukurca, Baykanl
- Dedebakırı, Baykanl
- Demirışık, Baykanl
- Derince, Baykanl
- Dilektepe, Baykanl
- Dokuzçavuş, Baykanl
- Engin, Baykanl
- Gümüşkaş, Baykanl
- Günbuldu, Baykanl
- Gündoğdu, Baykanl
- İkizler, Baykanl
- Karakaya, Baykanl
- Kasımlı, Baykanl
- Meşelik, Baykanl
- Narlıyurt, Baykanl
- Obalı, Baykanl
- Ormanpınar, Baykanl
- Sarıdana, Baykanl
- Sarısalkım, Baykanl
- Tütenocak, Baykanl
- Ulaştı, Baykanl
- Ünlüce, Baykanl
- Yarımca, Baykanl
- Yeşilçevre, Baykanl
- Ziyaret, Baykanl

== Eruh ==
- Eruh
- Akdiken, Eruh
- Bağgöze, Eruh
- Ballıkavak, Eruh
- Bayıryüzü, Eruh
- Bayramlı, Eruh
- Bilgili, Eruh
- Bingöl, Eruh
- Bozatlı, Eruh
- Bozkuş, Eruh
- Bölüklü, Eruh
- Budamış, Eruh
- Cintepe, Eruh
- Çeltiksuyu, Eruh
- Çetinkol, Eruh
- Çırpılı, Eruh
- Çimencik, Eruh
- Çizmeli, Eruh
- Dağdöşü, Eruh
- Dalkorur, Eruh
- Demiremek, Eruh
- Dikboğaz, Eruh
- Dönerdöver, Eruh
- Ekinyolu, Eruh
- Erenkaya, Eruh
- Gedikaşar, Eruh
- Gelenkardeş, Eruh
- Gölgelikonak, Eruh
- Gönülaldı, Eruh
- Görendoruk, Eruh
- Gülburnu, Eruh
- Karadayılar, Eruh
- Kaşıkyayla, Eruh
- Kavakgölü, Eruh
- Kavaközü, Eruh
- Kekliktepe, Eruh
- Kemerli, Eruh
- Kılıçkaya, Eruh
- Kuşdalı, Eruh
- Ormanardı, Eruh
- Ortaklı, Eruh
- Oymakılıç, Eruh
- Özlüpelit, Eruh
- Payamlı, Eruh
- Salkımbağlar, Eruh
- Savaş, Eruh
- Ufaca, Eruh
- Üzümlük, Eruh
- Yanılmaz, Eruh
- Yediyaprak, Eruh
- Yelkesen, Eruh
- Yerliçoban, Eruh
- Yeşilören, Eruh
- Yokuşlu, Eruh

== Kurtalan ==
- Kurtalan
- Ağaçlıpınar, Kurtalan
- Akçagedik, Kurtalan
- Akçalı, Kurtalan
- Akdem, Kurtalan
- Aksöğüt, Kurtalan
- Atalay, Kurtalan
- Avcılar, Kurtalan
- Aydemir, Kurtalan
- Azıklı, Kurtalan
- Bağlıca, Kurtalan
- Ballıkaya, Kurtalan
- Beykent, Kurtalan
- Bozhüyük, Kurtalan
- Bölüktepe, Kurtalan
- Çakıllı, Kurtalan
- Çalıdüzü, Kurtalan
- Çattepe, Kurtalan
- Çayırlı, Kurtalan
- Çeltikbaşı, Kurtalan
- Demirkuyu, Kurtalan
- Derince, Kurtalan
- Ekinli, Kurtalan
- Erdurağı, Kurtalan
- Gökdoğan, Kurtalan
- Gözpınar, Kurtalan
- Gürgöze, Kurtalan
- Güzeldere, Kurtalan
- İğdeli, Kurtalan
- İncirlik, Kurtalan
- Kapıkaya, Kurtalan
- Karabağ, Kurtalan
- Kayabağlar, Kurtalan
- Kayalısu, Kurtalan
- Kılıçlı, Kurtalan
- Konakpınar, Kurtalan
- Oyacık, Kurtalan
- Saipbeyli, Kurtalan
- Şenköy, Kurtalan
- Taşoluk, Kurtalan
- Tatlı, Kurtalan
- Tosunbağı, Kurtalan
- Toytepe, Kurtalan
- Tulumtaş, Kurtalan
- Tütün, Kurtalan
- Uluköy, Kurtalan
- Üçpınar, Kurtalan
- Yakıttepe, Kurtalan
- Yanarsu, Kurtalan
- Yayıklı, Kurtalan
- Yellice, Kurtalan
- Yeniköprü, Kurtalan
- Yeşilkonak, Kurtalan
- Yoldurağı, Kurtalan
- Yuvalı, Kurtalan
- Yürekveren, Kurtalan

== Pervari ==
- Pervari
- Aşağıbalcılar, Pervari
- Ayvalıbağ, Pervari
- Beğendik, Pervari
- Belenoluk, Pervari
- Bentköy, Pervari
- Çatköy, Pervari
- Çavuşlu, Pervari
- Çobanören, Pervari
- Çukurköy, Pervari
- Doğanca, Pervari
- Doğanköy, Pervari
- Dolusalkım, Pervari
- Düğüncüler, Pervari
- Ekindüzü, Pervari (Northeastern Neo-Aramaic: Hertevin, see Hertevin dialect)
- Erkent, Pervari
- Gökbudak, Pervari
- Gökçekoru, Pervari
- Gölgeli, Pervari
- Güleçler, Pervari
- Gümüşören, Pervari
- Karasungur, Pervari
- Karşıkaya, Pervari
- Keskin, Pervari
- Kışlacık, Pervari
- Kocaçavuş, Pervari
- Köprüçay, Pervari
- Narsuyu, Pervari
- Okçular, Pervari
- Ormandalı, Pervari
- Palamutlu, Pervari
- Sarıdam, Pervari
- Sarıyaprak, Pervari
- Söğütönü, Pervari
- Taşdibek, Pervari
- Tosuntarla, Pervari
- Tuzcular, Pervari
- Üçoyuk, Pervari
- Yanıkses, Pervari
- Yapraktepe, Pervari
- Yeniaydın, Pervari
- Yukarıbalcılar, Pervari

== Şirvan ==
- Şirvan
- Adıgüzel, Şirvan
- Akçayar, Şirvan
- Akgeçit, Şirvan
- Akyokuş, Şirvan
- Bayındır, Şirvan
- Belençay, Şirvan
- Boylu, Şirvan
- Cevizlik, Şirvan
- Çeltikyolu, Şirvan
- Çınarlı, Şirvan
- Daltepe, Şirvan
- Damlı, Şirvan
- Demirkapı, Şirvan
- Derinçay, Şirvan
- Dişlinar, Şirvan
- Doğruca, Şirvan
- Durankaya, Şirvan
- Elmadalı, Şirvan
- Gözlüce, Şirvan
- Gümüş, Şirvan
- Hürmüz, Şirvan
- İkizler, Şirvan
- İncekaya, Şirvan
- Kalkancık, Şirvan
- Kapılı, Şirvan
- Karaca, Şirvan
- Kasımlı, Şirvan
- Kayahisar, Şirvan
- Kesmetaş, Şirvan
- Kirazlı, Şirvan
- Kömürlü, Şirvan
- Madenköy, Şirvan
- Meşecik, Şirvan
- Nallıkaya, Şirvan
- Ormanbağı, Şirvan
- Ormanlı, Şirvan
- Otluk, Şirvan
- Oya, Şirvan
- Özpınar, Şirvan
- Pirinçli, Şirvan
- Sarıdana, Şirvan
- Sırçalı, Şirvan
- Soğanlı, Şirvan
- Soğuksu, Şirvan
- Suludere, Şirvan
- Suluyazı, Şirvan
- Taşlı, Şirvan
- Taşyaka, Şirvan
- Tatlıpayam, Şirvan
- Yağcılar, Şirvan
- Yalkaya, Şirvan
- Yamaçlı, Şirvan
- Yarımtepe, Şirvan
- Yaylacı, Şirvan
- Yayladağ, Şirvan
- Yedikapı, Şirvan
- Yolbaşı, Şirvan
