= Evciler, Kurtalan =

Hamlet in Siirt Province, Turkey

Evciler
- Settlement
- Location in Turkey
- Coordinates: 37.79916°N 41.70583°E
- Country: Turkey
- Province: Siirt
- District: Kurtalan
- Time zone: UTC+3 (TRT)

Evciler (Syriac: Al-Ġālbiyyah) is a hamlet in the Kurtalan District of Siirt Province in Turkey. It is attached to the village of Tulumtaş.

== History ==
Al-Ġālbiyyah (today called Evciler) was historically inhabited by Syriac Orthodox Christians. In the Syriac Orthodox patriarchal register of dues of 1870, it was recorded that the village had 10 households, who paid 171 dues, and had one priest, but did not have a church. It was located in the kaza (district) of Şirvan.

== Bibliography ==
- Bcheiry, Iskandar (2009). The Syriac Orthodox Patriarchal Register of Dues of 1870: An Unpublished Historical Document from the Late Ottoman Period. Gorgias Press.
