= Zübeyir Aydar =

Kurdish politician

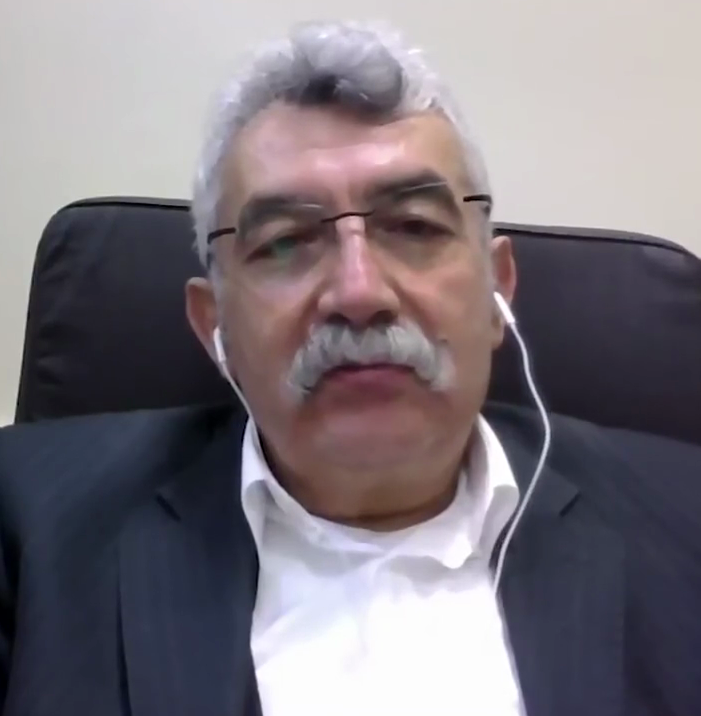

Member of the Grand National Assembly
- In office 2003 – 3 March 1994
- Constituency: Siirt (1991)

President of Kongra-Gel
- Incumbent
- Assumed office 2003

Personal details
- Born: 1961 (age 64–65) Siirt, Turkey
- Party: People's Labor Party (1991–1993) Democracy Party (1993–1994) Member of Kurdish National Congress / Kurdish Kongra Gel (1995–present)
- Education: Istanbul University
- Profession: Politician, Lawyer

Zübeyir Aydar (born 1961) is a Kurdish politician, lawyer and Kurdistan Communities Union (KCK) Executive Council Member, making him the de jure political leader of the outlawed Kurdistan Workers' Party (PKK).

== Biography ==
Born in Yanıkses village in the Eruh District of Siirt Province, he graduated from the Law Faculty of Istanbul University after which he worked as a lawyer in Siirt from 1986 to 1991. There he organized the local branch of the Turkish Human Rights Association (IHD) and joined the first Kurdish party in Turkey, the People's Labor Party (HEP). He was elected to the Grand National Assembly of Turkey in 1991 on a ticket with the Social Democratic Populist Party for the Siirt province. When HEP was banned in 1993, he joined the new Kurdish party, the Democracy Party (DEP). When DEP was banned in 1994, Aydar fled to Belgium as most party members were arrested by Turkish authorities. He has been living in Brussels since then. In Europe he joined the Kurdistan Parliament in Exile (PKDW) and later the Kurdistan National Congress (KNK) and Kurdistan Union of Communities (KCK), where he became head of the legislature in 2003.

He is wanted in Turkey for being "member of an illegal political party" and since October 14, 2009 wanted by the U.S. for alleged "narcotics trafficking", along with Murat Karayılan and Ali Riza Altun.

In June 2010, Belgian authorities arrested Aydar along with Remzi Kartal, Adem Uzun and Faruk Doru for involvement with financial transactions to PKK accounts. Several academic and political figures in Europe protested the arrest as counter-productive to finding a political solution for the Kurdish movement. After three weeks, Aydar and his co-defendants were released on lack of evidence.

In 2017, Belgian authorities uncovered a plot to assassinate Kurdish politicians Zübeyir Aydar and Remzi Kartal. The alleged hit team included Zekeriya Çelikbilek, a former Turkish military officer; Yakup Koç, found with a Turkish police ID; and Hacı Akkulak, a Kurdish Belgian resident. Surveillance of the Kurdish National Congress building in Brussels led to police intervention. While Çelikbilek and Koç fled Belgium, they were later convicted in absentia and sentenced to five years in prison by the Brussels Court of Appeals in 2024.

Aydar asserts that the assassination attempt is linked to the Turkish state, citing evidence of connections between the suspects and Turkish officials, including photographs with the Turkish ambassador to France and at the presidential palace. The case highlights concerns over alleged Turkish intelligence operations targeting dissidents in Europe.
