= Şirvan District =

District of Siirt Province, Turkey

Şirvan
- District
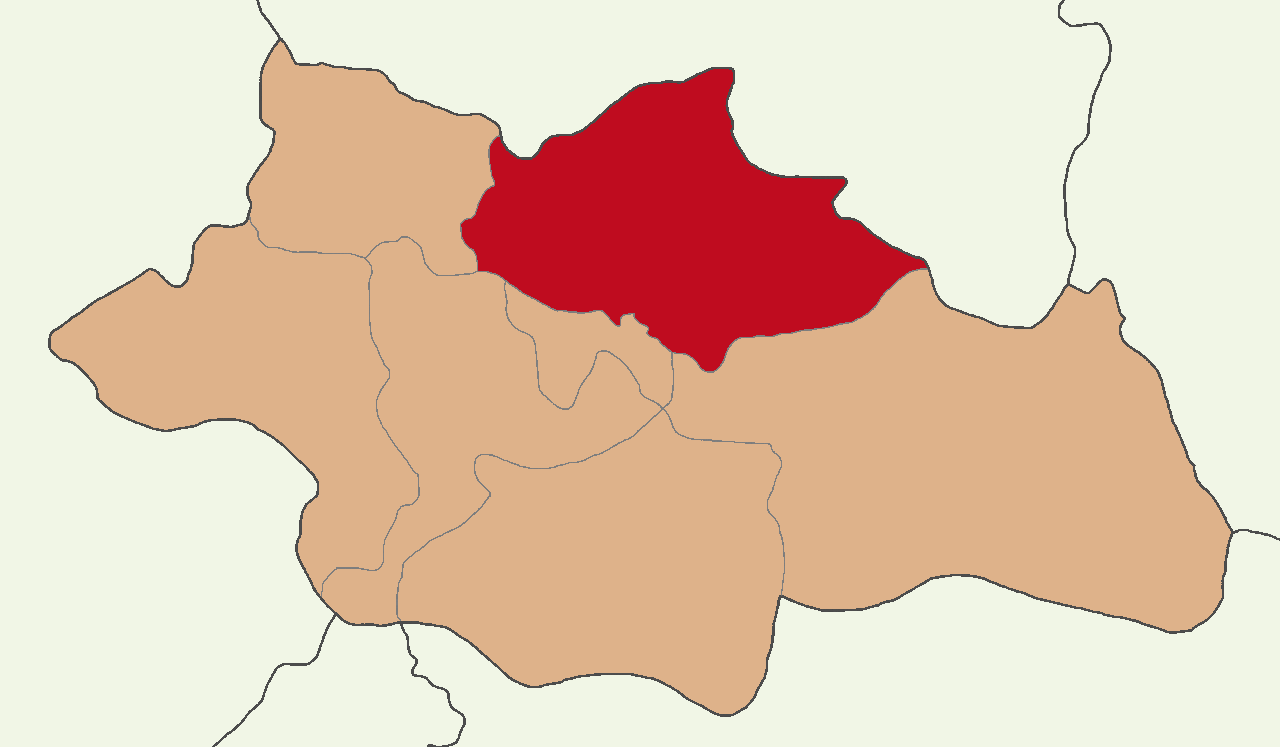
- Map showing Şirvan District in Siirt Province
- Country: Turkey
- Province: Siirt
- Seat: Şirvan
- Area: 936 km^{2} (361 sq mi)
- Population (2021): 21,321
  - Density: 23/km^{2} (59/sq mi)
- Time zone: UTC+3 (TRT)

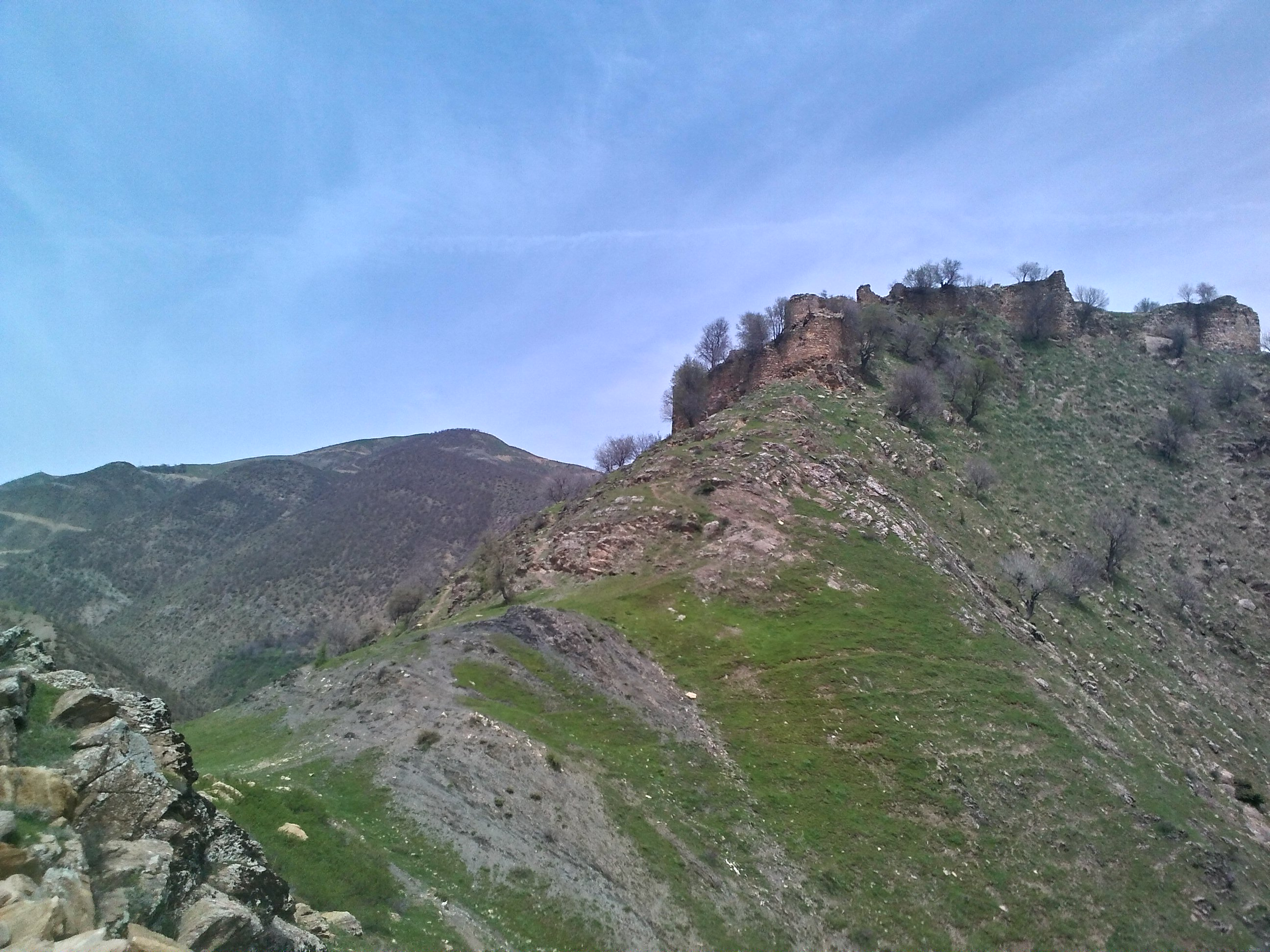
İrun Fortress, Kayahisar, Şirvan

Şirvan District is a district of Siirt Province in Turkey. The town of Şirvan is the seat and the district had a population of 21,321 in 2021. Its area is 936 km^{2}.

The district is fully Kurdish.

== Settlements ==
The district encompasses the belde of Şirvan, fifty-eight villages and fifty hamlets.

=== Villages ===
1. Adıgüzel (Pinzor)
2. Akçayar (Mezra Şêxan)
3. Akgeçit (Ganet)
4. Akyokuş (Zuzeht)
5. Bayındır (Kawmik)
6. Belençay (Handek)
7. Boylu (Mudus)
8. Cevizdalı (Hevek)
9. Cevizlik (Bimbat)
10. Çeltikyolu (Hesko)
11. Çınarlı (Awîl)
12. Daltepe (Hertawis)
13. Damlı (Pûlî)
14. Demirkapı (Herçîn)
15. Derinçay (Kelmix)
16. Dişlinar (Zivzik)
17. Doğruca (Ende)
18. Durankaya (Gelî)
19. Elmadalı (Firyar)
20. Gözlüce (Orek)
21. Gümüş (Cewmîş)
22. Hürmüz (Hurmiz)
23. İkizler (Kikan)
24. İncekaya (Kurmas)
25. Kalkancık (Matlît)
26. Kapılı (Mazoran)
27. Karaca (Tasil)
28. Kasımlı (Tahwan)
29. Kayahisar (Îron)
30. Kesmetaş (Serxos)
31. Kirazlı (Hevkes)
32. Kömürlü (Sirs)
33. Madenköy (Madan)
34. Meşecik (Mavekan)
35. Nallıkaya (Harat)
36. Ormanbağı (Iskambo)
37. Ormanlı (Osyak)
38. Otluk (Qalenz)
39. Oya (Zîzik)
40. Özpınar (Hesras)
41. Pirinçli (Mawit)
42. Sarıdana (Simxor)
43. Sırçalı (Papor)
44. Soğanlı (Miskin)
45. Soğuksu (Ewzind)
46. Suludere (Gundê Dizan)
47. Suluyazı (Merç)
48. Taşlı (Gundê Kîfer)
49. Taşyaka (Pay)
50. Tatlıpayam (Nivin)
51. Yağcılar (Sîsam)
52. Yalkaya (Daynan)
53. Yamaçlı (Birvîr)
54. Yarımtepe (Deştadêrê)
55. Yaylacı (Marinan)
56. Yayladağ (Saraz)
57. Yedikapı (Selenzo)
58. Yolbaşı (Kevijan)
