= Dağdüşü, Eruh =

Village in Siirt Province, Turkey

Dağdüşü
- Village
- Location within Turkey
- Coordinates: 37.665°N 42.143°E
- Country: Turkey
- Province: Siirt
- District: Eruh
- Population (2021): 479
- Time zone: UTC+3 (TRT)

Dağdüşü (Kurdish: Sexete) is a village in the Eruh District of Siirt Province in Turkey. The village is populated by Kurds of the Jilyan tribe and had a population of 479 in 2021.
