= Akdam, Kurtalan =

Village in Siirt Province, Turkey

Akdam
- Village
- Location within Turkey
- Coordinates: 37.973°N 41.439°E
- Country: Turkey
- Province: Siirt
- District: Kurtalan
- Population (2021): 310
- Time zone: UTC+3 (TRT)

Akdam (Syriac: Mār Mārūnā) (Note: Also known as Mār Mārūn.) is a village in the Kurtalan District of Siirt Province in Turkey. The village had a population of 310 in 2021.

The hamlet of Akdoğan is attached to the village.

== History ==
Mār Mārūnā (today called Akdam) was historically inhabited by Syriac Orthodox Christians. In the Syriac Orthodox patriarchal register of dues of 1870, it was recorded that the village had 3 households, who paid 9 dues, and did not have a church or a priest. Quryāqus, son of Ḥabbī, was ordained as diyāqūs (servant of the church) for the Church of Saint Mary the Virgin at Mār Mārūnā by Metropolitan Jirjis in 1325 AH (1907 AD).

== Bibliography ==
- Bcheiry, Iskandar (2009). The Syriac Orthodox Patriarchal Register of Dues of 1870: An Unpublished Historical Document from the Late Ottoman Period. Gorgias Press.
- Bcheiry, Iskandar (2023). "A Syriac Orthodox List of Diyāqūs (Servants of the Church) from the Late Ottoman Period" (PDF). The International Journal of Levant Studies. 5: 25–74.
