= Akmeşe, Eruh =

Village in Siirt Province, Turkey

Akmeşe
- Village
- Location within Turkey
- Coordinates: 37.841°N 42.256°E
- Country: Turkey
- Province: Siirt
- District: Eruh
- Population (2021): 10
- Time zone: UTC+3 (TRT)

Akmeşe (Kurdish: Dirêjkê Dihê) is a village in the Eruh District of Siirt Province in Turkey. The village is populated by Kurds of the Botikan tribe and had a population of 10 in 2021.

The hamlet of Kuyucak is attached to the village.
