= Tünekpınar, Eruh =

Village in Siirt Province, Turkey

Tünekpınar
- Village
- Location within Turkey
- Coordinates: 37.611°N 42.201°E
- Country: Turkey
- Province: Siirt
- District: Eruh
- Population (2022): 51
- Time zone: UTC+3 (TRT)

Tünekpınar (Kurdish: Aval) is a village in the Eruh District of Siirt Province in Turkey. The village is populated by Kurds of the Botikan tribe and had a population of 51 in 2022.

== Population history ==
The village had a population of 14 in 2007, was unpopulated between 2008 and 2020, and grew its population to 46 in 2021 and 51 in 2022.
