= Yanıkses, Eruh =

Village in Siirt Province, Turkey

Yanıkses
- Village
- Location within Turkey
- Coordinates: 37.710°N 42.370°E
- Country: Turkey
- Province: Siirt
- District: Eruh
- Population (2021): 139
- Time zone: UTC+3 (TRT)

Yanıkses (Kurdish: Hot) is a village in the Eruh District of Siirt Province in Turkey. The village had a population of 139 in 2021.

== Notable people ==
- Zübeyir Aydar
