= Bayırüzü, Eruh =

Village in Siirt Province, Turkey

Bayırüzü
- Village
- Location within Turkey
- Coordinates: 37.783°N 42.142°E
- Country: Turkey
- Province: Siirt
- District: Eruh
- Population (2021): 65
- Time zone: UTC+3 (TRT)

Bayırüzü (Kurdish: Rejnaf) is a village in the Eruh District of Siirt Province in Turkey. The village is populated by Kurds of the Botikan tribe and had a population of 65 in 2021.
