= Akçegedik, Kurtalan =

Village in Siirt Province, Turkey

Akçegedik
- Village
- Location within Turkey
- Coordinates: 38.048°N 41.558°E
- Country: Turkey
- Province: Siirt
- District: Kurtalan
- Population (2021): 201
- Time zone: UTC+3 (TRT)

Akçegedik (Kurdish: Ziqeyf) is a village in the Kurtalan District of Siirt Province in Turkey. The village is populated by Kurds and had a population of 201 in 2021.
