= Ağaçlıpınar, Kurtalan =

Village in Siirt Province, Turkey

Ağaçlıpınar
- Village
- Location within Turkey
- Coordinates: 37.894°N 41.705°E
- Country: Turkey
- Province: Siirt
- District: Kurtalan
- Population (2021): 271
- Time zone: UTC+3 (TRT)

Ağaçlıpınar (Armenian: Ayintar; Kurdish: Eyndar) is a village in the Kurtalan District of Siirt Province in Turkey. The village is populated by Kurds of the Pencenarî tribe and had a population of 271 in 2021.

According to the Armenian prelacy survey of 1902, the village had 8 Muslim and 10 Armenian households. Armenians had fled to the village in 1901 from Bekend. In 1913, it was home to 3 Armenian, 1 Assyrian, and 2 Muslim households.
