= Çeltikbaşı, Kurtalan =

Village in Siirt Province, Turkey

Çeltikbaşı
- Village
- Location within Turkey
- Coordinates: 37.742°N 41.725°E
- Country: Turkey
- Province: Siirt
- District: Kurtalan
- Population (2021): 178
- Time zone: UTC+3 (TRT)

Çeltikbaşı (Kurdish: Avta Xwarê; Syriac: Ūtī) is a village in the Kurtalan District of Siirt Province in Turkey. The village is populated by Kurds of the Erebiyan tribe and had a population of 178 in 2021.

== History ==
'Ūtī (today called Çeltikbaşı) was historically inhabited by Syriac Orthodox Christians. In the Syriac Orthodox patriarchal register of dues of 1870, it was recorded that the village had 21 households, who paid 56 dues, and did not have a church or a priest. It was located in the kaza (district) of Şirvan.

== Bibliography ==
- Bcheiry, Iskandar (2009). The Syriac Orthodox Patriarchal Register of Dues of 1870: An Unpublished Historical Document from the Late Ottoman Period. Gorgias Press.
- Tan, Altan (2018). Turabidin'den Berriye'ye. Aşiretler - Dinler - Diller - Kültürler (in Turkish). ISBN 9789944360944.
