= Cevizdalı, Şirvan =

Village in Siirt Province, Turkey

Cevizdalı
- Village
- Location within Turkey
- Coordinates: 38.190°N 42.026°E
- Country: Turkey
- Province: Siirt
- District: Şirvan
- Population (2021): 15
- Time zone: UTC+3 (TRT)

Cevizdalı (Kurdish: Hevek) is a village in the Şirvan District of Siirt Province in Turkey. The village is populated by Kurds and had a population of 15 in 2021. It was burned by authorities in 1995, during the Kurdish–Turkish conflict.

Until October 2022, the village was part of Bitlis District of Bitlis Province.
