= Aydemir, Kurtalan =

Village in Siirt Province, Turkey

Aydemir
- Village
- Location within Turkey
- Coordinates: 37.809°N 41.751°E
- Country: Turkey
- Province: Siirt
- District: Kurtalan
- Population (2021): 110
- Time zone: UTC+3 (TRT)

Aydemir (Kurdish: Husêniyê; Syriac: Al-Ḥusayniyyah) is a village in the Kurtalan District of Siirt Province in Turkey. The village is populated by Kurds and had a population of 110 in 2021.

== History ==
Al-Ḥusayniyyah (today called Aydemir) was historically inhabited by Syriac Orthodox Christians. In the Syriac Orthodox patriarchal register of dues of 1870, it was recorded that the village had 4 households, who paid 16 dues, and did not have a church or a priest. It was located in the kaza (district) of Şirvan.

The village was depopulated in the 1990s.

== Bibliography ==
- Bcheiry, Iskandar (2009). The Syriac Orthodox Patriarchal Register of Dues of 1870: An Unpublished Historical Document from the Late Ottoman Period. Gorgias Press.
- Whitman, Lois (1993). The Kurds of Turkey: Killings, Disappearances and Torture. Human Rights Watch. ISBN 9781564320964.
