= Yellice, Kurtalan =

Village in Siirt Province, Turkey

Yellice
- Village
- Location within Turkey
- Coordinates: 38.066°N 41.582°E
- Country: Turkey
- Province: Siirt
- District: Kurtalan
- Population (2021): 313
- Time zone: UTC+3 (TRT)

Yellice (Kurdish: Batran) is a village in the Kurtalan District of Siirt Province in Turkey. The village is populated by Kurds and had a population of 313 in 2021.

== History ==
The village formerly adhered to Yazidism but converted to Islam in the late 19th century with the guidance of Sheikh Abdulkahhâr from nearby Zokayd. After the conversion, a mosque was built, commissioned by Sultan Abdul Hamid II. A madrasa was also built which would educate many scholars.
