= Tütünköy, Kurtalan =

Village in Siirt Province, Turkey

Tütünköy
- Village
- Location within Turkey
- Coordinates: 38.011°N 41.728°E
- Country: Turkey
- Province: Siirt
- District: Kurtalan
- Population (2021): 346
- Time zone: UTC+3 (TRT)

Tütünköy (Kurdish: Titin) is a village in the Kurtalan District of Siirt Province in Turkey. The village had a population of 346 in 2021.

The hamlets of Aydıncık, Çay, Çukurlu, Kullaçentik, Tepecik and Yapılar are attached to the village.

== Notable people ==
- Rojda Aykoç
