= Savaşköy, Eruh =

Village in Siirt Province, Turkey

Savaşköy
- Village
- Location within Turkey
- Coordinates: 37.676°N 41.929°E
- Country: Turkey
- Province: Siirt
- District: Eruh
- Population (2021): 161
- Time zone: UTC+3 (TRT)

Savaşköy (Kurdish: Diye) is a village in the Eruh District of Siirt Province in Turkey. The village is populated by Kurds of the Jilyan tribe and had a population of 161 in 2021.

The hamlet of Dursunlar is attached to the village.
