= Okçular, Eruh =

Village in Siirt Province, Turkey

Okçular
- Village
- Location within Turkey
- Coordinates: 37.739°N 42.438°E
- Country: Turkey
- Province: Siirt
- District: Eruh
- Population (2021): 1,007
- Time zone: UTC+3 (TRT)

Okçular (Kurdish: Tirî) is a village in the Eruh District of Siirt Province in Turkey. The village is populated by Kurds and had a population of 1,007 in 2021.

It was depopulated in the 1990s.
