= Beşler, Kurtalan =

Village in Siirt Province, Turkey

Beşler
- Village
- Location within Turkey
- Coordinates: 38.057°N 41.615°E
- Country: Turkey
- Province: Siirt
- District: Kurtalan
- Population (2021): 196
- Time zone: UTC+3 (TRT)

Beşler (Kurdish: Bahimsa jor) is a village in the Kurtalan District of Siirt Province in Turkey. The village had a population of 196 in 2021.
