= Çırpılı, Eruh =

Village in Siirt Province, Turkey

Çırpılı
- Village
- Location within Turkey
- Coordinates: 37.782°N 42.033°E
- Country: Turkey
- Province: Siirt
- District: Eruh
- Population (2021): 111
- Time zone: UTC+3 (TRT)

Çırpılı (Kurdish: Misêfra) is a village in the Eruh District of Siirt Province in Turkey. The village is populated by Kurds of the Botikan tribe and had a population of 111 in 2021.

The hamlet of Kazanlı is attached to the village.
