= Yayıklı, Kurtalan =

Village in Siirt Province, Turkey

Yayıklı
- Village
- Location within Turkey
- Coordinates: 38.001°N 41.557°E
- Country: Turkey
- Province: Siirt
- District: Kurtalan
- Population (2021): 72
- Time zone: UTC+3 (TRT)

Yayıklı (Kurdish: Hakimiye) is a village in the Kurtalan District of Siirt Province in Turkey. The village is populated by Kurds and had a population of 72 in 2021.
