= Eruh District =

District of Siirt Province, Turkey

Eruh
- District
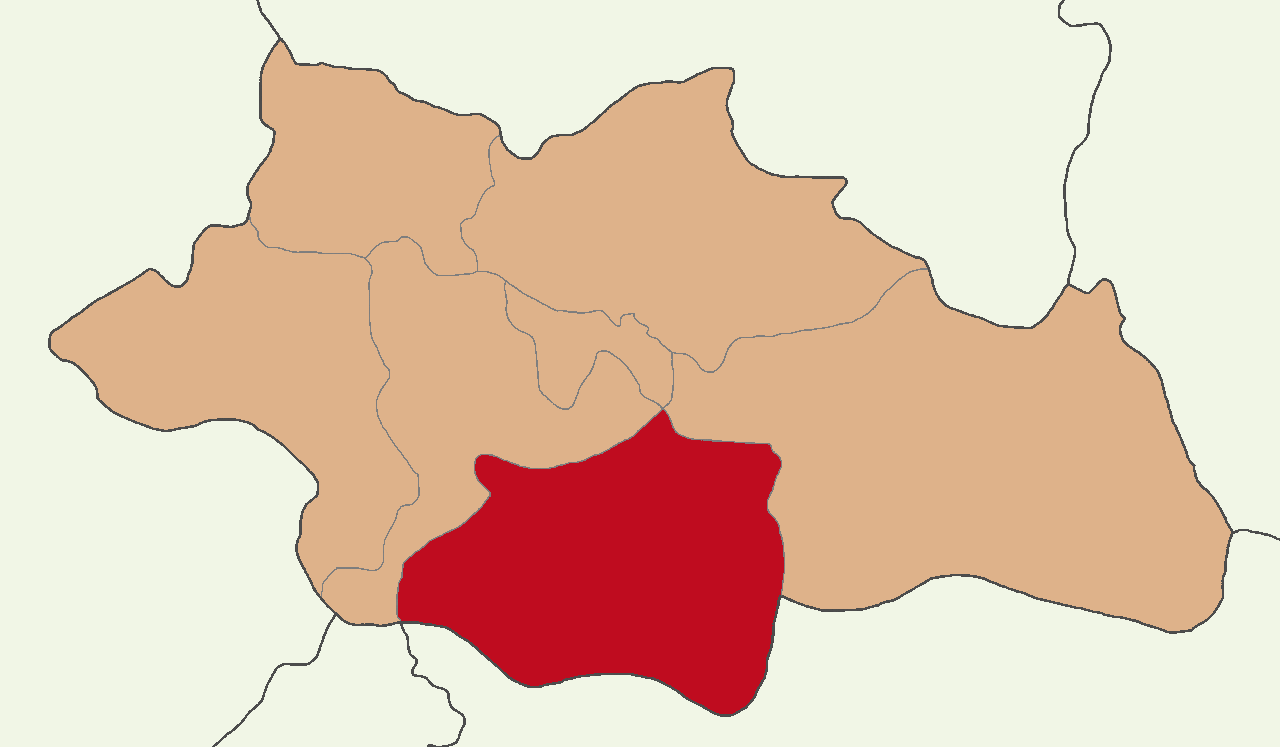
- Map showing Eruh District in Siirt Province
- Country: Turkey
- Province: Siirt
- Seat: Eruh
- Area: 1,061 km^{2} (410 sq mi)
- Population (2021): 18,101
  - Density: 17.06/km^{2} (44.19/sq mi)
- Time zone: UTC+3 (TRT)

Eruh District is a district of Siirt Province in Turkey which has the town of Eruh as its seat. The district had a population of 18,101 in 2021. Its area is 1,061 km^{2}.

== Settlements ==
The district encompasses the town of Eruh, fifty-six villages and eighteen hamlets.

=== Villages ===
1. Akdiken (Salpana)
2. Akmeşe (Dirêjkê Dihê)
3. Bağğöze (Ayne)
4. Ballıkavak (Lod)
5. Bayırüzü (Rejnaf)
6. Bayramlı (Tarham)
7. Bilgili (Dihê kevin)
8. Bingöl (Benguf)
9. Bozatlı (Bazna)
10. Bozkuş (Baluka)
11. Bölüklü (Gezeruk)
12. Budamış (Îspanka)
13. Cintepe (Buzikra)
14. Çeltiksuyu (Gerhaseyne)
15. Çetinkol (Kiver)
16. Çırpılı (Misêfra)
17. Çimencik (Tille)
18. Çizmeli (Nîvîlan)
19. Dadaklı (Nît)
20. Dağdüşü (Sexete)
21. Dalkorur (Kaniga)
22. Demiremek (Dirêjkê)
23. Dikboğaz (Rêşenê)
24. Dönerdöver (Bukat)
25. Ekinyolu (Geweşîl)
26. Erenkaya (Şêx Şehwelî)
27. Gedikaşar (Îrs)
28. Gelenkardeş (Şaşmilina)
29. Gölgelikonak (Heleluka)
30. Gönülaldı (Emteh)
31. Görendoruk (Memira)
32. Gülburnu (Şişil)
33. Karadayılar (Isxasa)
34. Kaşıkyayla (Zovanya)
35. Kavakgölü (Rehine)
36. Kekliktepe (Xalidî)
37. Kılıçkaya (Divke)
38. Kuşdalı (Şavulan)
39. Narlıdere (Bilcuna)
40. Okçular (Tirî)
41. Ortaklı (Şerka)
42. Oymakılıç (Baraşa)
43. Özlüpelit (Hesînga)
44. Payamlı (Deravit)
45. Salkımbağlar (Bedare)
46. Savaşköy (Diye)
47. Tünekpınar (Awal)
48. Ufaca (Îfaşa)
49. Üzümlük (Paris)
50. Yanıkses (Hot)
51. Yanılmaz (Torik)
52. Yediyaprak (Hergul)
53. Yelkesen (Basixre)
54. Yerliçoban (Kusê)
55. Yeşilören (Ginyanis)
56. Yokuşlu (Meylanan)
