= Belençay, Şirvan =

Village in Siirt Province, Turkey

Belençay
- Village
- Location within Turkey
- Coordinates: 38.007°N 42.316°E
- Country: Turkey
- Province: Siirt
- District: Şirvan
- Population (2021): 82
- Time zone: UTC+3 (TRT)

Belençay (Kurdish: Handek) is a village in the Şirvan District of Siirt Province in Turkey. The village had a population of 82 in 2021.

The hamlets of Darıcık and İncecik are attached to Belençay.
