= İğdeli, Kurtalan =

Village in Siirt Province, Turkey

İğdeli
- Village
- Location within Turkey
- Coordinates: 38.031°N 41.776°E
- Country: Turkey
- Province: Siirt
- District: Kurtalan
- Population (2021): 133
- Time zone: UTC+3 (TRT)

İğdeli (Kurdish: Mazoran) is a village in the Kurtalan District of Siirt Province in Turkey. The village had a population of 133 in 2021.

The hamlet of Yazılı is attached to the village.
