= Saipbeyli, Kurtalan =

Village in Siirt Province, Turkey

Saipbeyli
- Village
- Location within Turkey
- Coordinates: 37.996°N 41.510°E
- Country: Turkey
- Province: Siirt
- District: Kurtalan
- Population (2021): 738
- Time zone: UTC+3 (TRT)

Saipbeyli (Note: Also spelt as Saibbeyli.) (Kurdish: Beybo; Syriac: Bībū) is a village in the Kurtalan District of Siirt Province in Turkey. The village had a population of 738 in 2021.

The hamlets of Bahçeli, Göztepe and Karamanlı are attached to the village.

== History ==
Bībū (today called Saipbeyli) was historically inhabited by Syriac Orthodox Christians. In the Syriac Orthodox patriarchal register of dues of 1870, it was recorded that the village had 10 households, who paid 69 dues, and had one priest, but did not have a church.

== Bibliography ==
- Bcheiry, Iskandar (2009). The Syriac Orthodox Patriarchal Register of Dues of 1870: An Unpublished Historical Document from the Late Ottoman Period. Gorgias Press.
