= Tosunbağı, Kurtalan =

Village in Siirt Province, Turkey

Tosunbağı
- Village
- Location within Turkey
- Coordinates: 38.023°N 41.697°E
- Country: Turkey
- Province: Siirt
- District: Kurtalan
- Population (2021): 530
- Time zone: UTC+3 (TRT)

Tosunbağı (Kurdish: Zinahf) is a village in the Kurtalan District of Siirt Province in Turkey. The village had a population of 530 in 2021.

The hamlet of Doğanlı is attached to the village.
