= Yarımtepe, Şirvan =

Village in Siirt Province, Turkey

Yarımtepe
- Village
- Location within Turkey
- Coordinates: 38.073°N 42.217°E
- Country: Turkey
- Province: Siirt
- District: Şirvan
- Population (2021): 345
- Time zone: UTC+3 (TRT)

Yarımtepe (Kurdish: Deştadêrê) is a village in the Şirvan District of Siirt Province in Turkey. The village had a population of 345 in 2021.
