= Yoldurağı, Kurtalan =

Village in Siirt Province, Turkey

Yoldurağı
- Village
- Location within Turkey
- Coordinates: 37.935°N 41.440°E
- Country: Turkey
- Province: Siirt
- District: Kurtalan
- Population (2021): 143
- Time zone: UTC+3 (TRT)

Yoldurağı (Kurdish: Zivik) is a village in the Kurtalan District of Siirt Province in Turkey. The village is populated by Kurds and had a population of 143 in 2021.
