= Kuşdalı, Eruh =

Village in Siirt Province, Turkey

Kuşdalı
- Village
- Location within Turkey
- Coordinates: 37.767°N 42.276°E
- Country: Turkey
- Province: Siirt
- District: Eruh
- Population (2021): 203
- Time zone: UTC+3 (TRT)

Kuşdalı (Kurdish: Şavulan) is a village in the Eruh District of Siirt Province in Turkey. The village is populated by Kurds of the Botikan tribe and had a population of 203 in 2021.

The hamlet of Tatlıpinar (Şukal) is attached to the village.
