= Boylu, Şirvan =

Village in Siirt Province, Turkey

Boylu
- Village
- Location within Turkey
- Coordinates: 38.096°N 41.942°E
- Country: Turkey
- Province: Siirt
- District: Şirvan
- Population (2021): 352
- Time zone: UTC+3 (TRT)

Boylu (Kurdish: Mudus) is a village in the Şirvan District of Siirt Province in Turkey. The village is populated by Kurds of the Silokan tribe and had a population of 352 in 2021.

The hamlets of Ayranlı, Horgüç, Karayel and Kumlu are attached to Boylu.
