= Bayındır, Şirvan =

Village in Siirt Province, Turkey

Bayındır
- Village
- Location within Turkey
- Coordinates: 38.124°N 41.972°E
- Country: Turkey
- Province: Siirt
- District: Şirvan
- Population (2021): 138
- Time zone: UTC+3 (TRT)

Bayındır (Kurdish: Kawmik) is a village in the Şirvan District of Siirt Province in Turkey. The village had a population of 138 in 2021.
