= Adıgüzel, Şirvan =

Village in Siirt Province, Turkey

Adıgüzel
- Village
- Location within Turkey
- Coordinates: 38.031°N 42.262°E
- Country: Turkey
- Province: Siirt
- District: Şirvan
- Population (2021): 168
- Time zone: UTC+3 (TRT)

Adıgüzel (Kurdish: Pinzor) is a village in the Şirvan District of Siirt Province in Turkey. The village had a population of 168 in 2021.
