= Bölüktepe, Kurtalan =

Village in Siirt Province, Turkey

Bölüktepe
- Village
- Location within Turkey
- Coordinates: 38.022°N 41.672°E
- Country: Turkey
- Province: Siirt
- District: Kurtalan
- Population (2021): 2,553
- Time zone: UTC+3 (TRT)

Bölüktepe (Kurdish: Girê Hemdo) is a village in the Kurtalan District of Siirt Province in Turkey. The village is populated by Kurds of the Babosî tribe and had a population of 2,553 in 2021.

The hamlets of Çeşmeli and Pınarlı are attached to the village.
