= Konakpınar, Kurtalan =

Village in Siirt Province, Turkey

Konakpınar
- Village
- Location within Turkey
- Coordinates: 37.924°N 41.632°E
- Country: Turkey
- Province: Siirt
- District: Kurtalan
- Population (2021): 705
- Time zone: UTC+3 (TRT)

Konakpınar (Kurdish: Eynqesir; Syriac: Ayn Qaṣer) is a village in the Kurtalan District of Siirt Province in Turkey. The village is populated by Kurds of the Pencenarî tribe and had a population of 705 in 2021.

The hamlet of Demirdağ is attached to Konakpınar.

== History ==
'Ayn Qaṣer (today called Konakpınar) was historically inhabited by Syriac Orthodox Christians. In the Syriac Orthodox patriarchal register of dues of 1870, it was recorded that the village had 8 households, who paid 130 dues, and did not have a church or a priest.

== Bibliography ==
- Bcheiry, Iskandar (2009). The Syriac Orthodox Patriarchal Register of Dues of 1870: An Unpublished Historical Document from the Late Ottoman Period. Gorgias Press.
