= Kayalısu, Kurtalan =

Village in Siirt Province, Turkey

Kayalısu
- Village
- Location within Turkey
- Coordinates: 37.806°N 41.734°E
- Country: Turkey
- Province: Siirt
- District: Kurtalan
- Population (2021): 196
- Time zone: UTC+3 (TRT)

Kayalısu (Kurdish: Ûşiyê) is a village in the Kurtalan District of Siirt Province in Turkey. The village is populated by Kurds of the Erebiyan tribe and had a population of 196 in 2021.

The hamlets of Balıklı and Ergüven are attached to Kayalısu.
