= Gözlüce, Şirvan =

Village in Siirt Province, Turkey

Gözlüce
- Village
- Location within Turkey
- Coordinates: 38.176°N 42.101°E
- Country: Turkey
- Province: Siirt
- District: Şirvan
- Population (2021): 265
- Time zone: UTC+3 (TRT)

Gözlüce (Kurdish: Orek) is a village in the Şirvan District of Siirt Province in Turkey. The village had a population of 265 in 2021.
