= Kapılı, Şirvan =

Village in Siirt Province, Turkey

Kapılı
- Village
- Location within Turkey
- Coordinates: 37.967°N 42.204°E
- Country: Turkey
- Province: Siirt
- District: Şirvan
- Population (2021): 380
- Time zone: UTC+3 (TRT)

Kapılı (Kurdish: Mazoran) is a village in the Şirvan District of Siirt Province in Turkey. The village had a population of 380 in 2021.
