= Yakıttepe, Kurtalan =

Village in Siirt Province, Turkey

Yakıttepe
- Village
- Location within Turkey
- Coordinates: 37.889°N 41.486°E
- Country: Turkey
- Province: Siirt
- District: Kurtalan
- Population (2021): 113
- Time zone: UTC+3 (TRT)

Yakıttepe (Kurdish: Zengayê Mamo) is a village in the Kurtalan District of Siirt Province in Turkey. The village is populated by Kurds of the Elîkan tribe and had a population of 113 in 2021.

The hamlet of Yazyurdu is attached to the village.
