= Karabağ, Kurtalan =

Village in Siirt Province, Turkey

Karabağ
- Village
- Location within Turkey
- Coordinates: 38.039°N 41.707°E
- Country: Turkey
- Province: Siirt
- District: Kurtalan
- Population (2021): 227
- Time zone: UTC+3 (TRT)

Karabağ (Kurdish: Behavs) is a village in the Kurtalan District of Siirt Province in Turkey. The village is populated by Kurds and had a population of 227 in 2021.

The village was depopulated in the 1990s.
