= Yaylacı, Şirvan =

Village in Siirt Province, Turkey

Yaylacı
- Village
- Location within Turkey
- Coordinates: 37.948°N 42.223°E
- Country: Turkey
- Province: Siirt
- District: Şirvan
- Population (2021): 463
- Time zone: UTC+3 (TRT)

Yaylacı (Kurdish: Marinan) is a village in the Şirvan District of Siirt Province in Turkey. The village had a population of 463 in 2021.
