= Özlüpelit, Eruh =

Village in Siirt Province, Turkey

Özlüpelit
- Village
- Location within Turkey
- Coordinates: 37.670°N 42.104°E
- Country: Turkey
- Province: Siirt
- District: Eruh
- Population (2021): 86
- Time zone: UTC+3 (TRT)

Özlüpelit (Kurdish: Hesînga, Hesinika) is a village in the Eruh District of Siirt Province in Turkey. The village is populated by Kurds of the Botikan tribe and had a population of 86 in 2021.
