= Demirkapı, Şirvan =

Village in Siirt Province, Turkey

Demirkapı
- Village
- Location within Turkey
- Coordinates: 38.080°N 42.083°E
- Country: Turkey
- Province: Siirt
- District: Şirvan
- Population (2021): 102
- Time zone: UTC+3 (TRT)

Demirkapı (Kurdish: Herçîn) is a village in the Şirvan District of Siirt Province in Turkey. The village is populated by Kurds and had a population of 102 in 2021.

The village was depopulated in the 1990s.
