= Gözpınar, Kurtalan =

Village in Siirt Province, Turkey

Gözpınar
- Village
- Location within Turkey
- Coordinates: 37.978°N 41.456°E
- Country: Turkey
- Province: Siirt
- District: Kurtalan
- Population (2021): 1,638
- Time zone: UTC+3 (TRT)

Gözpınar (Kurdish: Hishis; Syriac: Ḥesḥes) (Note: Also known as Gospinar or Ḥiṣḥiṣ.) is a village in the Kurtalan District of Siirt Province in Turkey. The village is populated by Kurds of the Pencenarî tribe and had a population of 1,638 in 2021. Before the 2013 reorganisation, it was a town (belde).

== History ==
Ḥesḥes (today called Gözpınar) was historically inhabited by Syriac Orthodox Christians. In the Syriac Orthodox patriarchal register of dues of 1870, it was recorded that the village had 14 households, who paid 73 dues, and had one priest. There was a Syriac Orthodox church of Morī Isḥaq. Kawriyeh, son of Maqdesī Afrem, was ordained as diyāqūs (servant of the church) for Ḥesḥes by Metropolitan Ilyās on 20 October 1326 AH (1908 AD).

== Bibliography ==
- Bcheiry, Iskandar (2009). The Syriac Orthodox Patriarchal Register of Dues of 1870: An Unpublished Historical Document from the Late Ottoman Period. Gorgias Press.
- Bcheiry, Iskandar (2023). "A Syriac Orthodox List of Diyāqūs (Servants of the Church) from the Late Ottoman Period" (PDF). The International Journal of Levant Studies. 5: 25–74.
