= Kalkancık, Şirvan =

Village in Siirt Province, Turkey

Kalkancık
- Village
- Location within Turkey
- Coordinates: 38.061°N 42.351°E
- Country: Turkey
- Province: Siirt
- District: Şirvan
- Population (2021): 41
- Time zone: UTC+3 (TRT)

Kalkancık (Kurdish: Matlît) is a village in the Şirvan District of Siirt Province in Turkey. The village had a population of 41 in 2021.
