= Taşlı, Şirvan =

Village in Siirt Province, Turkey

Taşlı
- Village
- Location within Turkey
- Coordinates: 37.990°N 42.140°E
- Country: Turkey
- Province: Siirt
- District: Şirvan
- Population (2021): 1,331
- Time zone: UTC+3 (TRT)

Taşlı (Kurdish: Gundê Kîfer) is a village in the Şirvan District of Siirt Province in Turkey. The village is populated by Kurds of the Sturkiyan tribe and had a population of 1,331 in 2021.

The hamlets of Ördekli, Söbetaş, Tekören and Yatağan are attached to Taşlı.
