= Dikboğaz, Eruh =

Village in Siirt Province, Turkey

Dikboğaz
- Village
- Location within Turkey
- Coordinates: 37.695°N 42.108°E
- Country: Turkey
- Province: Siirt
- District: Eruh
- Population (2021): 731
- Time zone: UTC+3 (TRT)

Dikboğaz (Kurdish: Rêşenê) is a village in the Eruh District of Siirt Province in Turkey. The village is populated by Kurds of the Jilyan tribe and had a population of 731 in 2021.
