= Otluk, Şirvan =

Village in Siirt Province, Turkey

Otluk
- Village
- Location within Turkey
- Coordinates: 38.107°N 42.172°E
- Country: Turkey
- Province: Siirt
- District: Şirvan
- Population (2021): 57
- Time zone: UTC+3 (TRT)

Otluk (Kurdish: Qalenz) is a village in the Şirvan District of Siirt Province in Turkey. The village had a population of 57 in 2021.

The hamlet of Benekli is attached to the village.
