= Gelenkardeş, Eruh =

Village in Siirt Province, Turkey

Gelenkardeş
- Village
- Location within Turkey
- Coordinates: 37.765°N 42.063°E
- Country: Turkey
- Province: Siirt
- District: Eruh
- Population (2021): 24
- Time zone: UTC+3 (TRT)

Gelenkardeş (Kurdish: Şaş) is a village in the Eruh District of Siirt Province in Turkey. The village is populated by Kurds of the Botikan tribe and had a population of 24 in 2021.

The hamlet of Dikmenli (Milina) is attached to Gelenkardeş.
