= Gönülaldı, Eruh =

Village in Siirt Province, Turkey

Gönülaldı
- Village
- Location within Turkey
- Coordinates: 37.701°N 42.079°E
- Country: Turkey
- Province: Siirt
- District: Eruh
- Population (2021): 103
- Time zone: UTC+3 (TRT)

Gönülaldı (Kurdish: Emteh) is a village in the Eruh District of Siirt Province in Turkey. The village is populated by Kurds of the Jilyan tribe and had a population of 103 in 2021.
