= Kaşıkyayla, Eruh =

Village in Siirt Province, Turkey

Kaşıkyayla
- Village
- Location within Turkey
- Coordinates: 37.703°N 41.929°E
- Country: Turkey
- Province: Siirt
- District: Eruh
- Population (2021): 213
- Time zone: UTC+3 (TRT)

Kaşıkyayla (Kurdish: Zovanya) is a village in the Eruh District of Siirt Province in Turkey. The village had a population of 213 in 2021.
