= Gökdoğan, Kurtalan =

Village in Siirt Province, Turkey

Gökdoğan
- Village
- Location within Turkey
- Coordinates: 37.952°N 41.404°E
- Country: Turkey
- Province: Siirt
- District: Kurtalan
- Population (2021): 530
- Time zone: UTC+3 (TRT)

Gökdoğan (Kurdish: Cimzerk) is a village in the Kurtalan District of Siirt Province in Turkey. The village is populated by Kurds and had a population of 530 in 2021.

The hamlet of Yunuslar is attached to Gökdoğan.

Gökdoğan was partially depopulated in the 1990s.
