= Yayladağ, Şirvan =

Village in Siirt Province, Turkey

Yayladağ
- Village
- Location within Turkey
- Coordinates: 38.094°N 42.311°E
- Country: Turkey
- Province: Siirt
- District: Şirvan
- Population (2021): 164
- Time zone: UTC+3 (TRT)

Yayladağ (Kurdish: Saraz) is a village in the Şirvan District of Siirt Province in Turkey. The village is populated by Kurds and had a population of 164 in 2021.

The hamlet of Doyumlu is attached to the village.

Yayladağ was burned by authorities in 1995, during the Kurdish–Turkish conflict.
