= Kılıçlı, Kurtalan =

Village in Siirt Province, Turkey

Kılıçlı
- Village
- Location within Turkey
- Coordinates: 38.011°N 41.770°E
- Country: Turkey
- Province: Siirt
- District: Kurtalan
- Population (2021): 303
- Time zone: UTC+3 (TRT)

Kılıçlı (Kurdish: Başura) is a village in the Kurtalan District of Siirt Province in Turkey. The village is populated by Kurds of the Pencenarî tribe and had a population of 303 in 2021.

The hamlets of Kanikervane and Uluağaç are attached to the village.
