= Soğuksu, Şirvan =

Village in Siirt Province, Turkey

Soğuksu
- Village
- Location within Turkey
- Coordinates: 38.043°N 42.356°E
- Country: Turkey
- Province: Siirt
- District: Şirvan
- Population (2021): 41
- Time zone: UTC+3 (TRT)

Soğuksu (Kurdish: Ewzind) is a village in the Şirvan District of Siirt Province in Turkey. The village had a population of 41 in 2021.

The hamlets of Çatak and Kartal are attached to the village.
