= İncirlik, Kurtalan =

Village in Siirt Province, Turkey

İncirlik
- Village
- Location within Turkey
- Coordinates: 37.927°N 41.517°E
- Country: Turkey
- Province: Siirt
- District: Kurtalan
- Population (2021): 196
- Time zone: UTC+3 (TRT)

İncirlik (Kurdish: Xindukê) is a village in the Kurtalan District of Siirt Province in Turkey. The village had a population of 196 in 2021.

The hamlet of Yolboyu is attached to the village.
