= Kavakgölü, Eruh =

Village in Siirt Province, Turkey

Kavakgölü
- Village
- Location within Turkey
- Coordinates: 37.794°N 41.992°E
- Country: Turkey
- Province: Siirt
- District: Eruh
- Population (2021): 43
- Time zone: UTC+3 (TRT)

Kavakgölü (Kurdish: Rehine) is a village in the Eruh District of Siirt Province in Turkey. The village is populated by Kurds of the Botikan tribe and had a population of 43 in 2021.

The hamlet of Kutluca (Mizgeft) is attached to the village.
