= Taşyaka, Şirvan =

Village in Siirt Province, Turkey

Taşyaka
- Village
- Location within Turkey
- Coordinates: 38.017°N 42.174°E
- Country: Turkey
- Province: Siirt
- District: Şirvan
- Population (2021): 147
- Time zone: UTC+3 (TRT)

Taşyaka (Kurdish: Pay) is a village in the Şirvan District of Siirt Province in Turkey. The village had a population of 147 in 2021.
