= Şenköy, Kurtalan =

Village in Siirt Province, Turkey

Şenköy
- Village
- Location within Turkey
- Coordinates: 37.916°N 41.529°E
- Country: Turkey
- Province: Siirt
- District: Kurtalan
- Population (2021): 288
- Time zone: UTC+3 (TRT)

Şenköy (Kurdish: Bîra Kurêdiya) is a village in the Kurtalan District of Siirt Province in Turkey. The village is populated by Kurds of the Pencenarî tribe and had a population of 288 in 2021.

The hamlets of Kuyulu and Yeniköy are attached to the village.
