= Erenkaya, Eruh =

Village in Siirt Province, Turkey

Erenkaya
- Village
- Location within Turkey
- Coordinates: 37.634°N 42.062°E
- Country: Turkey
- Province: Siirt
- District: Eruh
- Population (2021): 234
- Time zone: UTC+3 (TRT)

Erenkaya (Kurdish: Şêx Şehwelî) is a village in the Eruh District of Siirt Province in Turkey. The village is inhabited by Kurds of the Jilyan tribe and had a population of 234 in 2021.
