= Çattepe, Kurtalan =

Village in Siirt Province, Turkey

Çattepe
- Village
- Location within Turkey
- Coordinates: 37.755°N 41.769°E
- Country: Turkey
- Province: Siirt
- District: Kurtalan
- Population (2021): 3
- Time zone: UTC+3 (TRT)

Çattepe (Kurdish: Tilê) is a village in the Kurtalan District of Siirt Province in Turkey. The village is populated by Kurds of the Erebiyan tribe and had a population of 3 in 2021.
