= Ormanbağı, Şirvan =

Village in Siirt Province, Turkey

Ormanbağı
- Village
- Location within Turkey
- Coordinates: 38.160°N 42.001°E
- Country: Turkey
- Province: Siirt
- District: Şirvan
- Population (2021): 916
- Time zone: UTC+3 (TRT)

Ormanbağı (Kurdish: Iskambo) is a village in the Şirvan District of Siirt Province in Turkey. The village had a population of 916 in 2021.

The hamlet of Tosun is attached to Ormanbağı.
