= Çalıdüzü, Kurtalan =

Village in Siirt Province, Turkey

Çalıdüzü
- Village
- Location within Turkey
- Coordinates: 37.935°N 41.465°E
- Country: Turkey
- Province: Siirt
- District: Kurtalan
- Population (2021): 144
- Time zone: UTC+3 (TRT)

Çalıdüzü (Kurdish: Melha) is a village in the Kurtalan District of Siirt Province in Turkey. The village had a population of 144 in 2021.
