= Taşoluk, Kurtalan =

Village in Siirt Province, Turkey

Taşoluk
- Village
- Location within Turkey
- Coordinates: 38.025°N 41.493°E
- Country: Turkey
- Province: Siirt
- District: Kurtalan
- Population (2021): 36
- Time zone: UTC+3 (TRT)

Taşoluk (Kurdish: Xirbê) is a village in the Kurtalan District of Siirt Province in Turkey. The village is populated by Kurds and had a population of 36 in 2021.

The hamlet of Yayık is part of the village.
