= Elmadalı, Şirvan =

Village in Siirt Province, Turkey

Elmadalı
- Village
- Location within Turkey
- Coordinates: 38.193°N 42.165°E
- Country: Turkey
- Province: Siirt
- District: Şirvan
- Population (2021): 566
- Time zone: UTC+3 (TRT)

Elmadalı (Kurdish: Firyar) is a village in the Şirvan District of Siirt Province in Turkey. The village had a population of 566 in 2021.
