= Nallıkaya, Şirvan =

Village in Siirt Province, Turkey

Nallıkaya
- Village
- Location within Turkey
- Coordinates: 38.171°N 42.142°E
- Country: Turkey
- Province: Siirt
- District: Şirvan
- Population (2021): 633
- Time zone: UTC+3 (TRT)

Nallıkaya (Kurdish: Harat) is a village in the Şirvan District of Siirt Province in Turkey. The village had a population of 633 in 2021.

The hamlets of Atmaca, Turgutlu and Tüylüce are attached to the village.
