= Atalay, Kurtalan =

Village in Siirt Province, Turkey

Atalay
- Village
- Location within Turkey
- Coordinates: 37.755°N 41.687°E
- Country: Turkey
- Province: Siirt
- District: Kurtalan
- Population (2021): 31
- Time zone: UTC+3 (TRT)

Atalay (Kurdish: Qubane) is a village in the Kurtalan District of Siirt Province in Turkey. The village had a population of 31 in 2021.
