= Yuvalı, Kurtalan =

Village in Siirt Province, Turkey

Yuvalı
- Village
- Location within Turkey
- Coordinates: 37.826°N 41.813°E
- Country: Turkey
- Province: Siirt
- District: Kurtalan
- Population (2021): 110
- Time zone: UTC+3 (TRT)

Yuvalı (Kurdish: Beytil) is a village in the Kurtalan District of Siirt Province in Turkey. The village is populated by Kurds and had a population of 110 in 2021.

The hamlets of Bozdoğan and Söğütlü (Kanî Mirê) are attached to Yuvalı. Söğütlü is populated by the Erebiyan tribe.

The village was depopulated in the 1990s.
