= Uluköy, Kurtalan =

Village in Siirt Province, Turkey

Uluköy
- Village
- Location within Turkey
- Coordinates: 38.011°N 41.641°E
- Country: Turkey
- Province: Siirt
- District: Kurtalan
- Population (2021): 497
- Time zone: UTC+3 (TRT)

Uluköy (Kurdish: Bera) is a village in the Kurtalan District of Siirt Province in Turkey. The village is populated by Kurds of the Babosî tribe and had a population of 497 in 2021.

The hamlet of Gümüşsu is attached to Uluköy.
