= Yeşilkonak, Kurtalan =

Village in Siirt Province, Turkey

Yeşilkonak
- Village
- Location within Turkey
- Coordinates: 37.879°N 41.737°E
- Country: Turkey
- Province: Siirt
- District: Kurtalan
- Population (2021): 225
- Time zone: UTC+3 (TRT)

Yeşilkonak (Kurdish: Qadiyan) is a village in the Kurtalan District of Siirt Province in Turkey. The village is populated by Kurds of non-tribal affiliation and had a population of 225 in 2021.

The hamlet of Mağralı is attached to the village.
