= Salkımbağlar, Eruh =

Village in Siirt Province, Turkey

Salkımbağlar
- Village
- Location within Turkey
- Coordinates: 37.681°N 41.936°E
- Country: Turkey
- Province: Siirt
- District: Eruh
- Population (2021): 110
- Time zone: UTC+3 (TRT)

Salkımbağlar (Kurdish: Bedare) is a village in the Eruh District of Siirt Province in Turkey. The village is populated by Kurds of the Jilyan tribe and had a population of 110 in 2021.
