= Üçpınar, Kurtalan =

Village in Siirt Province, Turkey

Üçpınar
- Village
- Location within Turkey
- Coordinates: 37.837°N 41.710°E
- Country: Turkey
- Province: Siirt
- District: Kurtalan
- Population (2021): 513
- Time zone: UTC+3 (TRT)

Üçpınar (Kurdish: Bîşêr) is a village in the Kurtalan District of Siirt Province in Turkey. The village is populated by Kurds of the Pencenarî tribe and had a population of 513 in 2021.

The hamlets of Aşağıbeşir and Kargılı are attached to the village.
