= Hürmüz, Şirvan =

Village in Siirt Province, Turkey

Hürmüz
- Village
- Location within Turkey
- Coordinates: 38.060°N 42.218°E
- Country: Turkey
- Province: Siirt
- District: Şirvan
- Population (2021): 82
- Time zone: UTC+3 (TRT)

Hürmüz (Kurdish: Hurmiz) is a village in the Şirvan District of Siirt Province in Turkey. The village is populated by Kurds of the Sturkiyan tribe and had a population of 82 in 2021.
