= Ortaklı, Eruh =

Village in Siirt Province, Turkey

Ortaklı
- Village
- Location within Turkey
- Coordinates: 37.802°N 42.040°E
- Country: Turkey
- Province: Siirt
- District: Eruh
- Population (2021): 33
- Time zone: UTC+3 (TRT)

Ortaklı (Kurdish: Şerka) is a village in the Eruh District of Siirt Province in Turkey. The village is populated by Kurds of the Botikan tribe and had a population of 33 in 2021.

The hamlet of Ulaşlar is attached to the village.
