= Pirinçli, Şirvan =

Village in Siirt Province, Turkey

Pirinçli
- Village
- Location within Turkey
- Coordinates: 37.955°N 42.181°E
- Country: Turkey
- Province: Siirt
- District: Şirvan
- Population (2021): 666
- Time zone: UTC+3 (TRT)

Pirinçli (Kurdish: Mawit) is a village in the Şirvan District of Siirt Province in Turkey. The village is populated by Kurds of the Berojî tribe and had a population of 338 in 2021.

The hamlets of Kaniyasaro, Kısraklı and Serinpınar are attached to Pirinçli.
