= Avcılar, Kurtalan =

Village in Siirt Province, Turkey

Avcılar
- Village
- Location within Turkey
- Coordinates: 37.926°N 41.425°E
- Country: Turkey
- Province: Siirt
- District: Kurtalan
- Population (2021): 82
- Time zone: UTC+3 (TRT)

Avcılar (Kurdish: Qinaskê) is a village in the Kurtalan District of Siirt Province in Turkey. The village is populated by Kurds of the Elîkan tribe and had a population of 82 in 2021.
