= Ekinyolu, Eruh =

Village in Siirt Province, Turkey

Ekinyolu
- Village
- Location within Turkey
- Coordinates: 37.694°N 41.912°E
- Country: Turkey
- Province: Siirt
- District: Eruh
- Population (2021): 179
- Time zone: UTC+3 (TRT)

Ekinyolu (Kurdish: Geweşîl) is a village in the Eruh District of Siirt Province in Turkey. The village is populated by Kurds of the Jilyan tribe and had a population of 179 in 2021.

The hamlet of Sevindik is attached to the village.
