= Çeltikyolu, Şirvan =

Village in Siirt Province, Turkey

Çeltikyolu
- Village
- Location within Turkey
- Coordinates: 38.142°N 42.066°E
- Country: Turkey
- Province: Siirt
- District: Şirvan
- Population (2021): 345
- Time zone: UTC+3 (TRT)

Çeltikyolu (Kurdish: Hesko) is a village in the Şirvan District of Siirt Province in Turkey. The village is populated by Kurds and had a population of 345 in 2021.

It was burned by authorities in 1995, during the Kurdish–Turkish conflict.
