= Karaca, Şirvan =

Village in Siirt Province, Turkey

Karaca
- Village
- Location within Turkey
- Coordinates: 38.121°N 42.034°E
- Country: Turkey
- Province: Siirt
- District: Şirvan
- Population (2021): 253
- Time zone: UTC+3 (TRT)

Karaca (Kurdish: Tasil) is a village in the Şirvan District of Siirt Province in Turkey. The village had a population of 253 in 2021.

The hamlet of Aydıncık is attached to Karaca.
