= Kayahisar, Şirvan =

Village in Siirt Province, Turkey

Kayahisar
- Village
- Location within Turkey
- Coordinates: 38.158°N 42.227°E
- Country: Turkey
- Province: Siirt
- District: Şirvan
- Population (2021): 446
- Time zone: UTC+3 (TRT)

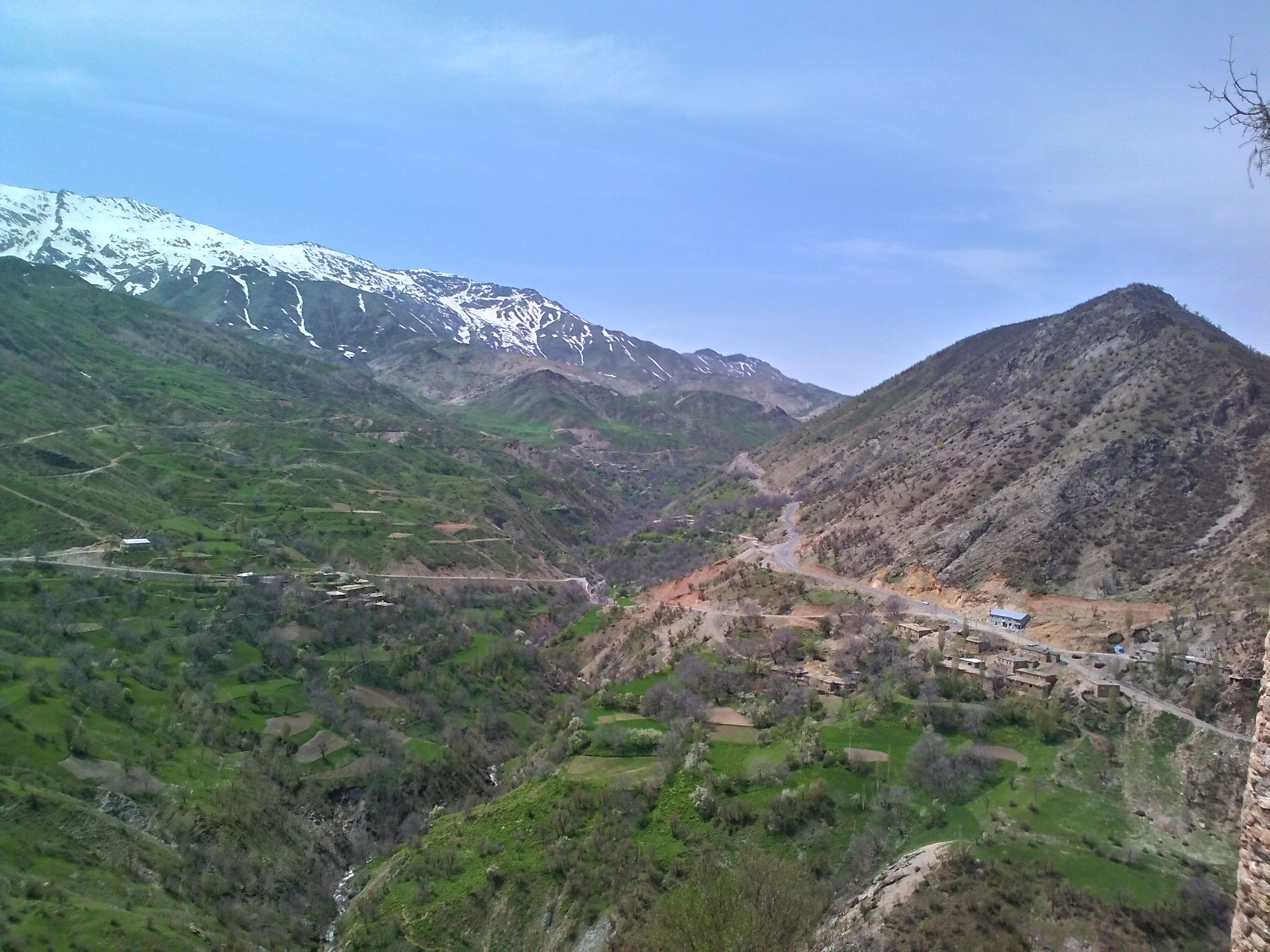
İrun Fortress, Kayahisar, Şirvan

Kayahisar (Kurdish: Îron) is a village in the Şirvan District of Siirt Province in Turkey. The village had a population of 446 in 2021.

The hamlets of Bindal, Gürgencik, Kayalı and Toplu are attached to the village.
