= Çınarlı, Şirvan =

Village in Siirt Province, Turkey

Çınarlı
- Village
- Location within Turkey
- Coordinates: 38.059°N 42.238°E
- Country: Turkey
- Province: Siirt
- District: Şirvan
- Population (2021): 10
- Time zone: UTC+3 (TRT)

Çınarlı (Kurdish: Awîl) is a village in the Şirvan District of Siirt Province in Turkey. The village had a population of 10 in 2021.
