= Derince, Kurtalan =

Village in Siirt Province, Turkey

Derince
- Village
- Location within Turkey
- Coordinates: 37.920°N 41.576°E
- Country: Turkey
- Province: Siirt
- District: Kurtalan
- Population (2021): 313
- Time zone: UTC+3 (TRT)

Derince (Kurdish: Xalibîye) is a village in the Kurtalan District of Siirt Province in Turkey. The village had a population of 313 in 2021.
