= Yerliçoban, Eruh =

Village in Siirt Province, Turkey

Yerliçoban
- Village
- Location within Turkey
- Coordinates: 37.694°N 42.019°E
- Country: Turkey
- Province: Siirt
- District: Eruh
- Population (2021): 261
- Time zone: UTC+3 (TRT)

Yerliçoban (Kurdish: Kusê) is a village in the Eruh District of Siirt Province in Turkey. The village is populated by Kurds of the Jilyan tribe and had a population of 261 in 2021.
