= İkizler, Şirvan =

Village in Siirt Province, Turkey

İkizler
- Village
- Location in Turkey
- Coordinates: 38.065°N 41.927°E
- Country: Turkey
- Province: Siirt
- District: Şirvan
- Population (2021): 380
- Time zone: UTC+3 (TRT)

İkizler (Kurdish: Beytarûn) is a village in the Şirvan District of Siirt Province in Turkey. The village is populated by Kurds of the Silokan tribe and had a population of 380 in 2021.

The hamlets of Nergiz and Saçayak are attached to İkizler.
