= Kılıçkaya, Eruh =

Village in Siirt Province, Turkey

Kılıçkaya
- Village
- Location within Turkey
- Coordinates: 37.767°N 41.939°E
- Country: Turkey
- Province: Siirt
- District: Eruh
- Population (2021): 48
- Time zone: UTC+3 (TRT)

Kılıçkaya (Kurdish: Divke, Devke) is a village in the Eruh District of Siirt Province in Turkey. The village is populated by Kurds of the Botikan tribe and had a population of 48 in 2021.
