= Bilgili, Eruh =

Village in Siirt Province, Turkey

Bilgili
- Village
- Location within Turkey
- Coordinates: 37.795°N 42.271°E
- Country: Turkey
- Province: Siirt
- District: Eruh
- Population (2021): 346
- Time zone: UTC+3 (TRT)

Bilgili, historically Eski Eruh, (Kurdish: Dihê kevin) is a village in the Eruh District of Siirt Province in Turkey. The village is populated by Kurds of the Botikan tribe and had a population of 346 in 2021.

The hamlets of Çayır (Merge) and Demirciler are attached to Bayramlı.
