= Azıklı, Kurtalan =

Village in Siirt Province, Turkey

Azıklı
- Village
- Location within Turkey
- Coordinates: 37.980°N 41.544°E
- Country: Turkey
- Province: Siirt
- District: Kurtalan
- Population (2021): 194
- Time zone: UTC+3 (TRT)

Azıklı (Kurdish: Bastoka) is a village in the Kurtalan District of Siirt Province in Turkey. The village is populated by Kurds and had a population of 194 in 2021.
