= Çeltiksuyu, Eruh =

Village in Siirt Province, Turkey

Çeltiksuyu
- Village
- Location within Turkey
- Coordinates: 37.703°N 41.915°E
- Country: Turkey
- Province: Siirt
- District: Eruh
- Population (2021): 172
- Time zone: UTC+3 (TRT)

Çeltiksuyu (Kurdish: Gerhaseyne) is a village in the Eruh District of Siirt Province in Turkey. The village is populated by Kurds of the Jilyan tribe and had a population of 172 in 2021.
