= Gümüş, Şirvan =

Village in Siirt Province, Turkey

Gümüş
- Village
- Location within Turkey
- Coordinates: 38.082°N 42.275°E
- Country: Turkey
- Province: Siirt
- District: Şirvan
- Population (2021): 20
- Time zone: UTC+3 (TRT)

Gümüş (Kurdish: Cewmîş) is a village in the Şirvan District of Siirt Province in Turkey. The village had a population of 20 in 2021.
