= Sırçalı, Şirvan =

Village in Siirt Province, Turkey

Sırçalı
- Village
- Location within Turkey
- Coordinates: 38.037°N 42.367°E
- Country: Turkey
- Province: Siirt
- District: Şirvan
- Population (2021): 204
- Time zone: UTC+3 (TRT)

Sırçalı (Kurdish: Papor) is a village in the Şirvan District of Siirt Province in Turkey. The village had a population of 204 in 2021.
