= Yedikapı, Şirvan =

Village in Siirt Province, Turkey

Yedikapı
- Village
- Location within Turkey
- Coordinates: 38.018°N 42.284°E
- Country: Turkey
- Province: Siirt
- District: Şirvan
- Population (2021): 49
- Time zone: UTC+3 (TRT)

Yedikapı (Kurdish: Selenzo) is a village in the Şirvan District of Siirt Province in Turkey. The village is populated by Kurds and had a population of 49 in 2021.

The hamlets of Başçavuş and İmren are attached to Yolbaşı.

The village was depopulated in the 1990s.
