= Güzeldere, Kurtalan =

Village in Siirt Province, Turkey

Güzeldere
- Village
- Location within Turkey
- Coordinates: 37.958°N 41.546°E
- Country: Turkey
- Province: Siirt
- District: Kurtalan
- Population (2021): 185
- Time zone: UTC+3 (TRT)

Güzeldere (Kurdish: Gozelder) is a village in the Kurtalan District of Siirt Province in Turkey. The village is populated by Kurds of the Pencenarî tribe and had a population of 185 in 2021.

The hamlet of Demirbaşı and Işıklı are attached to Güzeldere.
