= Oya, Şirvan =

Village in Siirt Province, Turkey

Oya
- Village
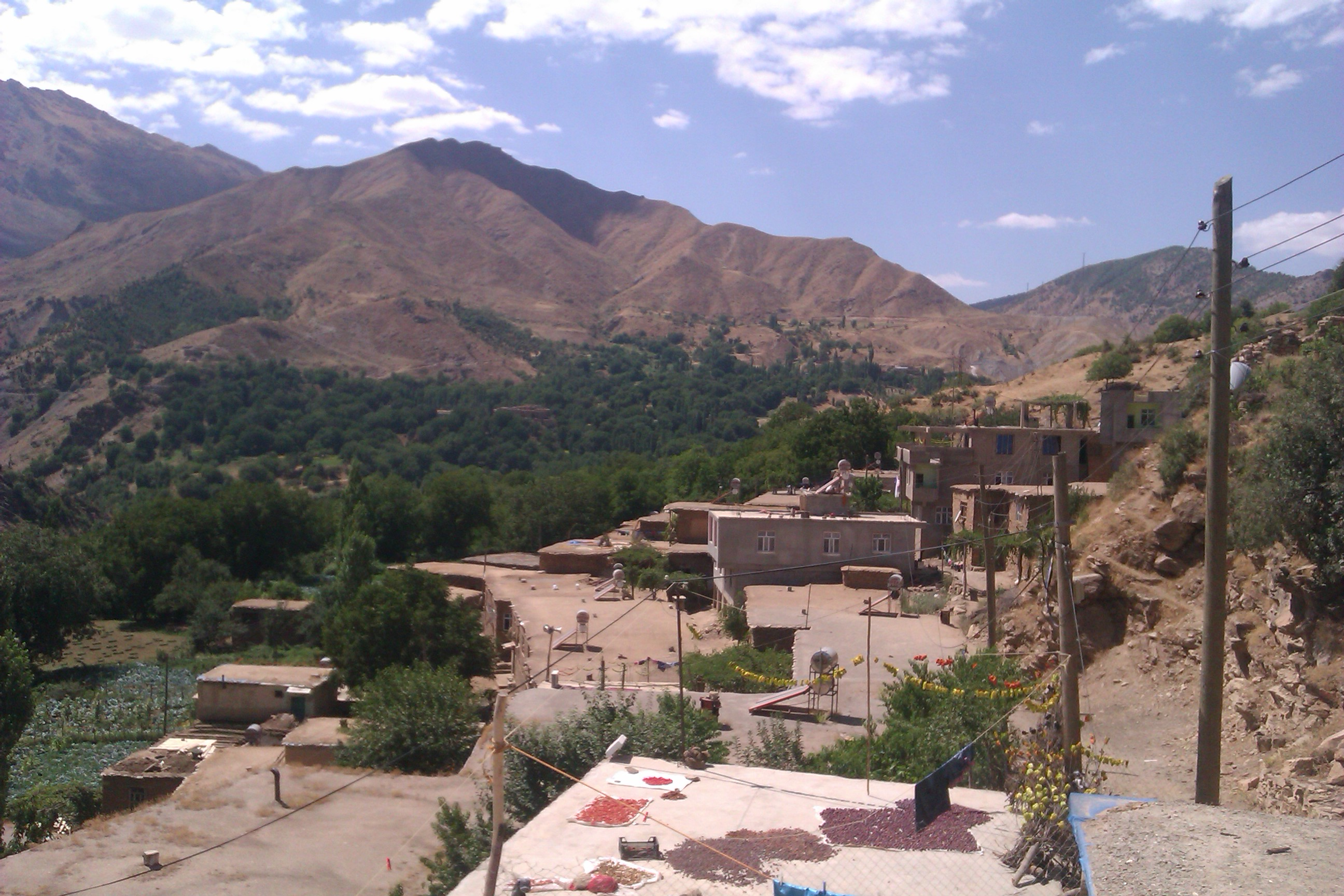

- Location within Turkey
- Coordinates: 38.158°N 42.244°E
- Country: Turkey
- Province: Siirt
- District: Şirvan
- Population (2021): 282
- Time zone: UTC+3 (TRT)

Oya (Kurdish: Zîzik) is a village in the Şirvan District of Siirt Province in Turkey. The village had a population of 282 in 2021.
