= Ormanlı, Şirvan =

Village in Siirt Province, Turkey

Ormanlı
- Village
- Location within Turkey
- Coordinates: 38.203°N 42.122°E
- Country: Turkey
- Province: Siirt
- District: Şirvan
- Population (2021): 444
- Time zone: UTC+3 (TRT)

Ormanlı (Kurdish: Osyak) is a village in the Şirvan District of Siirt Province in Turkey. The village had a population of 444 in 2021.

The hamlet of Çöğürlü is attached to Ormanlı.
