= Tulumtaş, Kurtalan =

Village in Siirt Province, Turkey

Tulumtaş
- Village
- Location within Turkey
- Coordinates: 37.770°N 41.730°E
- Country: Turkey
- Province: Siirt
- District: Kurtalan
- Population (2021): 867
- Time zone: UTC+3 (TRT)

Tulumtaş (Kurdish: Cefan; Syriac: Gafānī) (Note: Also known as Djeffen, Djafan, or Jeffen.) is a village in the Kurtalan District of Siirt Province in Turkey. The village is populated by Kurds of the Erebiyan tribe and had a population of 867 in 2021.

The hamlets of Akbulut, Çukurlu and Evciler are attached to Tulumtaş.

== History ==
Gafānī (today called Tulumtaş) was historically inhabited by Syriac Orthodox Christians. In the Syriac Orthodox patriarchal register of dues of 1870, it was recorded that the village had 4 households, who paid 17 dues, and did not have a church or a priest.

According to the Sghert Prelacy survey in 1902, the village had 3 Armenian households and 8 Turkish households. The 1913 Sghert Prelacy survey recorded that the village had 5 Syriac households and 30 Muslim households.

== Bibliography ==
- Bcheiry, Iskandar (2009). The Syriac Orthodox Patriarchal Register of Dues of 1870: An Unpublished Historical Document from the Late Ottoman Period. Gorgias Press.
- Tan, Altan (2018). Turabidin'den Berriye'ye. Aşiretler - Dinler - Diller - Kültürler (in Turkish). ISBN 9789944360944.
