= Sarıdana, Şirvan =

Village in Siirt Province, Turkey

Sarıdana
- Village
- Location within Turkey
- Coordinates: 37.973°N 42.283°E
- Country: Turkey
- Province: Siirt
- District: Şirvan
- Population (2021): 252
- Time zone: UTC+3 (TRT)

Sarıdana (Kurdish: Simxor; Syriac: Semḥōr) (Note: Alternatively transliterated as Samḫūr, Simhor, Simkhor, or Smkhor. Nisba: Simkhorī.) is a village in the Şirvan District of Siirt Province in Turkey. The village had a population of 252 in 2021. It is located in the Botan valley.

== History ==
Semḥōr (today called Sarıdana) was historically inhabited by Syriac Orthodox Christians. Syriacs from the village emigrated to Istanbul in the 1840s. In the Syriac Orthodox patriarchal register of dues of 1870, it was recorded that the village had 57 households, who paid 469 dues, and had one priest, but did not have a church. According to Raymond Kévorkian, it was populated by Armenians and adherents of the Church of the East. It was the largest non-Muslim village in the Şirvan District. The village was not affected by the Hamidian massacres in 1895 as it was protected by a hired Kurdish guard. By 1898, there were 50 Syriac households, according to James Henry Monahan, the British Vice-Consul of Bitlis.

== Bibliography ==
- Al-Jeloo, Nicholas (2019). "Who were the Assyrians of Bitlis?". In Mehmet İnbaşı; Mehmet Demirtaş (eds.). Tarihî ve Kültürel Yönleriyle Bitlis. Vol. II. Bitlis Eren Üniversitesi Yayınları. pp. 363–390.
- Atto, Naures (2011). Hostages in the Homeland, Orphans in the Diaspora: Identity Discourses Among the Assyrian/Syriac Elites in the European Diaspora (PDF). Leiden University Press.
- Bcheiry, Iskandar (2009). The Syriac Orthodox Patriarchal Register of Dues of 1870: An Unpublished Historical Document from the Late Ottoman Period. Gorgias Press.
- Demir Görür, Emel (2020). "İngiliz Konsolos James Henry Monahan'ın Raporlarında Bitlis Vilayeti (1896-1898)". Akademik Bakış (in Turkish). 13 (26): 244–266. doi:10.19060/gav.750472. Archived from the original on 27 November 2020.
- Verheij, Jelle (2017). ""The year of the firman:" The 1895 massacres in Hizan and Şirvan (Bitlis vilayet)". Études arméniennes contemporaines. 10 (10): 125–159.
- Wilmshurst, David (2000). The Ecclesiastical Organisation of the Church of the East, 1318–1913 (PDF). Peeters Publishers.
