= Özpınar, Şirvan =

Village in Siirt Province, Turkey

Özpınar
- Village
- Location within Turkey
- Coordinates: 38.006°N 42.244°E
- Country: Turkey
- Province: Siirt
- District: Şirvan
- Population (2021): 338
- Time zone: UTC+3 (TRT)

Özpınar (Kurdish: Hesras) is a village in the Şirvan District of Siirt Province in Turkey. The village is populated by Kurds of the Mehmediyan tribe and had a population of 338 in 2021.
