= Yeniköprü, Kurtalan =

Village in Siirt Province, Turkey

Yeniköprü
- Village
- Location within Turkey
- Coordinates: 37.911°N 41.738°E
- Country: Turkey
- Province: Siirt
- District: Kurtalan
- Population (2021): 295
- Time zone: UTC+3 (TRT)

Yeniköprü (Kurdish: Kirava) is a village in the Kurtalan District of Siirt Province in Turkey. The village is populated by Kurds of non-tribal affiliation and had a population of 295 in 2021.
