= Akgeçit, Şirvan =

Village in Siirt Province, Turkey

Akgeçit
- Village
- Location within Turkey
- Coordinates: 38.069°N 42.199°E
- Country: Turkey
- Province: Siirt
- District: Şirvan
- Population (2021): 96
- Time zone: UTC+3 (TRT)

Akgeçit (Kurdish: Ganet) is a village in the Şirvan District of Siirt Province in Turkey. The village had a population of 96 in 2021.

The hamlets of Deştadere, Gülpınar and Meşecik are attached to the village.
