= Kapıkaya, Kurtalan =

Village in Siirt Province, Turkey

Kapıkaya
- Village
- Location within Turkey
- Coordinates: 38.022°N 41.607°E
- Country: Turkey
- Province: Siirt
- District: Kurtalan
- Population (2021): 81
- Time zone: UTC+3 (TRT)

Kapıkaya (Kurdish: Kevirêhamo) is a village in the Kurtalan District of Siirt Province in Turkey. The village had a population of 81 in 2021.
