= Yalkaya, Şirvan =

Village in Siirt Province, Turkey

Yalkaya
- Village
- Location within Turkey
- Coordinates: 37.980°N 42.326°E
- Country: Turkey
- Province: Siirt
- District: Şirvan
- Population (2021): 83
- Time zone: UTC+3 (TRT)

Yalkaya (Kurdish: Daynan) is a village in the Şirvan District of Siirt Province in Turkey. The village had a population of 83 in 2021.
