= Yelkesen, Eruh =

Village in Siirt Province, Turkey

Yelkesen
- Village
- Location within Turkey
- Coordinates: 37.658°N 41.981°E
- Country: Turkey
- Province: Siirt
- District: Eruh
- Population (2021): 319
- Time zone: UTC+3 (TRT)

Yelkesen (Kurdish: Basixre) is a village in the Eruh District of Siirt Province in Turkey. The village is populated by Kurds of the Jilyan tribe and had a population of 319 in 2021.

The hamlet of Ilıcak is attached to the village.
