= Derinçay, Şirvan =

Village in Siirt Province, Turkey

Derinçay
- Village
- Location within Turkey
- Coordinates: 38.039°N 42.105°E
- Country: Turkey
- Province: Siirt
- District: Şirvan
- Population (2021): 319
- Time zone: UTC+3 (TRT)

Derinçay (Kurdish: Kelmix) is a village in the Şirvan District of Siirt Province in Turkey. The village is populated by Kurds of the Sturkiyan tribe and had a population of 319 in 2021.

The hamlet of Dilecik is attached to the village.
