= İncekaya, Şirvan =

Village in Siirt Province, Turkey

İncekaya
- Village
- Location within Turkey
- Coordinates: 38.024°N 42.132°E
- Country: Turkey
- Province: Siirt
- District: Şirvan
- Population (2021): 319
- Time zone: UTC+3 (TRT)

İncekaya (Kurdish: Kurmas) is a village in the Şirvan District of Siirt Province in Turkey. The village is populated by Kurds of the Sturkiyan tribe and had a population of 496 in 2021.
