= Çizmeli, Eruh =

Village in Siirt Province, Turkey

Çizmeli
- Village
- Location within Turkey
- Coordinates: 37.824°N 42.171°E
- Country: Turkey
- Province: Siirt
- District: Eruh
- Population (2021): 282
- Time zone: UTC+3 (TRT)

Çizmeli (Kurdish: Nîvîlan) is a village in the Eruh District of Siirt Province in Turkey. The village is populated by Kurds of the Botikan tribe and had a population of 282 in 2021.

The hamlet of Pelitli is attached to the village.
