= Budamış, Eruh =

Village in Siirt Province, Turkey

Budamış
- Village
- Location within Turkey
- Coordinates: 37.739°N 42.058°E
- Country: Turkey
- Province: Siirt
- District: Eruh
- Population (2021): 31
- Time zone: UTC+3 (TRT)

Budamış (Kurdish: Îspanka) is a village in the Eruh District of Siirt Province in Turkey. The village is populated by Kurds of the Botikan tribe and had a population of 31 in 2021.

The hamlet of Peynirli is attached to the village.
