= Kurtalan District =

District of Siirt Province, Turkey

Kurtalan
- District
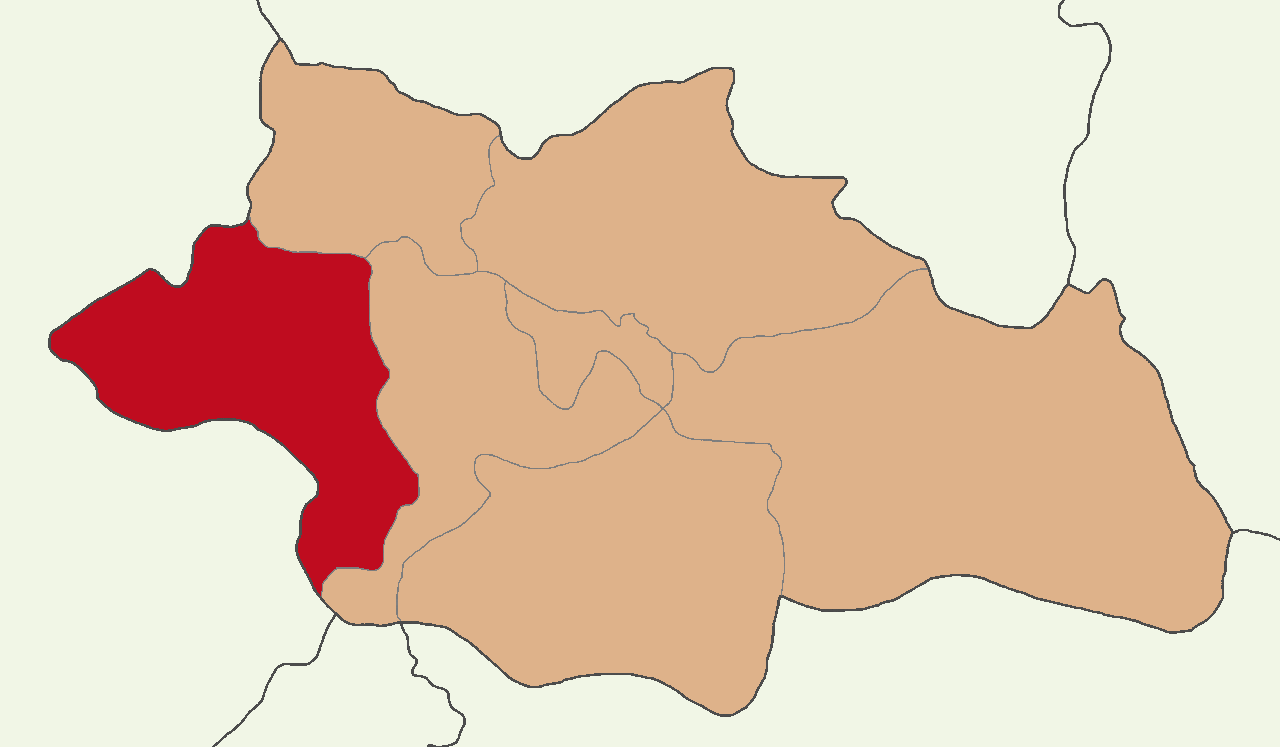
- Map showing Kurtalan District in Siirt Province
- Country: Turkey
- Province: Siirt
- Seat: Kurtalan
- Area: 811 km^{2} (313 sq mi)
- Population (2021): 60,592
  - Density: 75/km^{2} (190/sq mi)
- Time zone: UTC+3 (TRT)

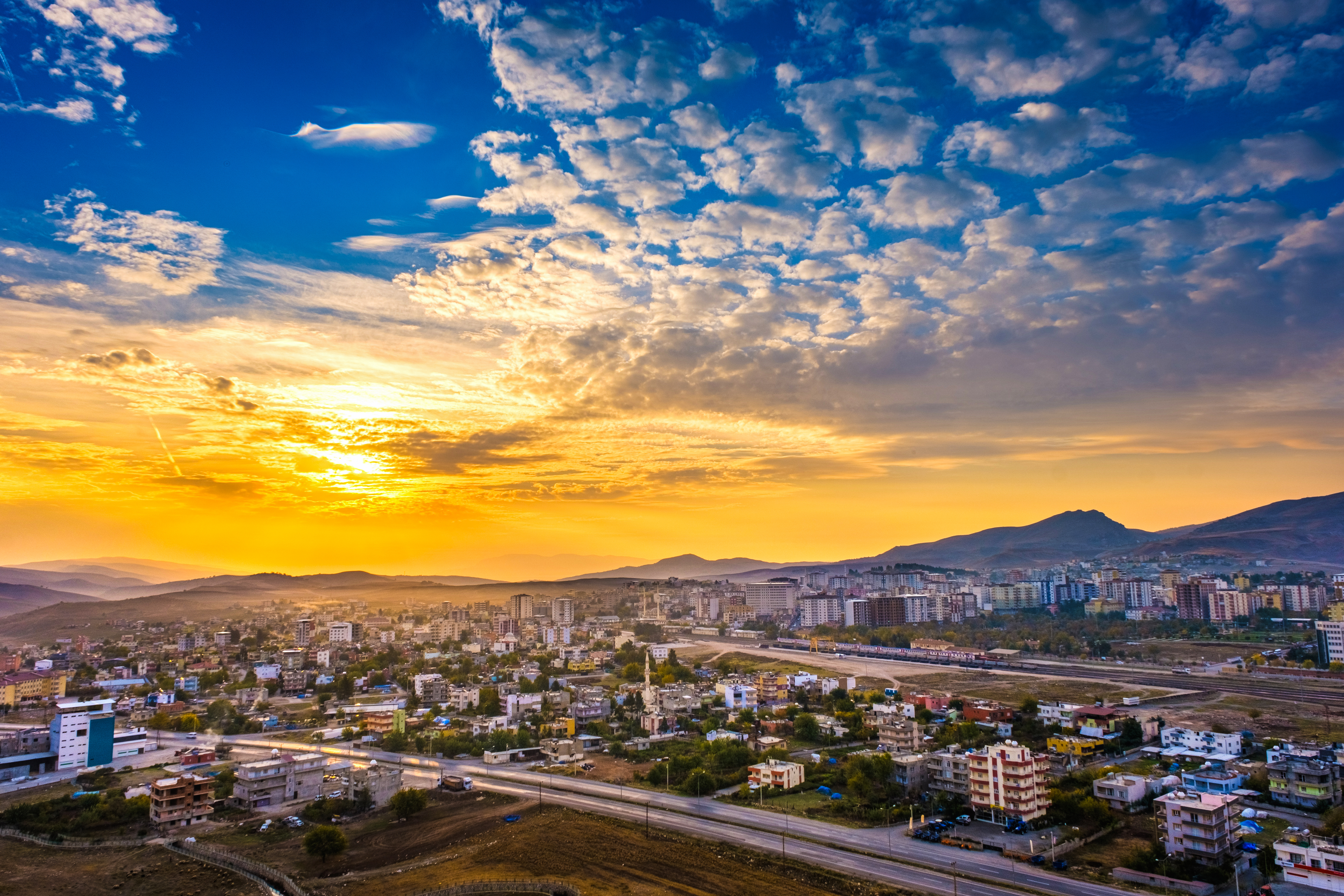
Kurtalan

Kurtalan District is a district of Siirt Province in Turkey. The town of Kurtalan is the seat and the district had a population of 60,592 in 2021. Its area is 811 km^{2}.

The district is populated by Kurds, it used to be called "Garzan" until 1938. The current District Governor is Ihsan Emre Aydin.

== Settlements ==
The district encompasses two municipalities, fifty-five villages and forty-seven hamlets.

=== Municipalities ===
1. Kayabağlar (Zokayd)
2. Kurtalan (Misircê)

=== Villages ===
1. Ağaçlıpınar (Ayndarê)
2. Akçalı (Bakirdê)
3. Akçegedik (Ziqeyf)
4. Akdam
5. Aksöğüt (Dilbe)
6. Atalay (Qubane)
7. Avcılar (Qinaskê)
8. Aydemir (Husêniyê)
9. Azıklı (Bastoka)
10. Bağlıca (Siyan)
11. Ballıkaya (Badê)
12. Beşler (Bahimsa jor)
13. Beykent (Beykend)
14. Bozhüyük (Teliba)
15. Bölüktepe (Girê Hemdo)
16. Çakıllı (Palonî)
17. Çalıdüzü (Melha)
18. Çattepe (Tilê)
19. Çayırlı (Searta)
20. Çeltikbaşı (Avta Xwarê)
21. Demirkuyu (Beysatun)
22. Derince (Xalibîye)
23. Ekinli
24. Erdurağı (Kelemeran)
25. Gökdoğan (Cimzerk)
26. Gözpınar (Hishis)
27. Gürgöze (Ayneke)
28. Güzeldere (Gozelder)
29. İğdeli (Mazoran)
30. İncirlik (Xindukê)
31. Kapıkaya (Kevirêhamo)
32. Karabağ (Behavs)
33. Kayalısu (Ûşiyê)
34. Kılıçlı (Başur)
35. Konakpınar (Eynqesir)
36. Saipbeyli (Beybo)
37. Şenköy (Bîra Kurêdiya)
38. Taşoluk (Xirbê)
39. Tatlı (Kozik)
40. Teylan
41. Tosunbağı (Zinahf)
42. Toytepe (Merce)
43. Tulumtaş (Cefan)
44. Tütünköy (Titin)
45. Uluköy (Bera)
46. Üçpınar (Bişer)
47. Yakıttepe
48. Yanarsu (Zoke)
49. Yayıklı
50. Yellice (Batran)
51. Yeniköprü (Kirava)
52. Yeşilkonak (Qadiyan)
53. Yoldurağı (Zivik)
54. Yuvalı (Beytil)
55. Yürekveren (Binof)
