= Karadayılar, Eruh =

Village in Siirt Province, Turkey

Karadayılar
- Village
- Location within Turkey
- Coordinates: 37.692°N 41.964°E
- Country: Turkey
- Province: Siirt
- District: Eruh
- Population (2021): 52
- Time zone: UTC+3 (TRT)

Karadayılar (Kurdish: Isxasa) is a village in the Eruh District of Siirt Province in Turkey. The village had a population of 48 in 2021.
