= Cevizlik, Şirvan =

Village in Siirt Province, Turkey

Cevizlik
- Village
- Location within Turkey
- Coordinates: 38.179°N 42.230°E
- Country: Turkey
- Province: Siirt
- District: Şirvan
- Population (2021): 1,286
- Time zone: UTC+3 (TRT)

Cevizlik (Kurdish: Bimbat) is a village in the Şirvan District of Siirt Province in Turkey. The village had a population of 1,286 in 2021.
