= Kesmetaş, Şirvan =

Village in Siirt Province, Turkey

Kesmetaş
- Village
- Location within Turkey
- Coordinates: 38.161°N 42.208°E
- Country: Turkey
- Province: Siirt
- District: Şirvan
- Population (2021): 395
- Time zone: UTC+3 (TRT)

Kesmetaş (Kurdish: Serxos) is a village in the Şirvan District of Siirt Province in Turkey. The village had a population of 395 in 2021.
