= Bayramlı, Eruh =

Village in Siirt Province, Turkey

Bayramlı
- Village
- Location within Turkey
- Coordinates: 37.839°N 42.136°E
- Country: Turkey
- Province: Siirt
- District: Eruh
- Population (2021): 60
- Time zone: UTC+3 (TRT)

Bayramlı (Kurdish: Tarham) is a village in the Eruh District of Siirt Province in Turkey. The village is populated by Kurds of the Botikan tribe and had a population of 60 in 2021.

The hamlets of Baltalı and Sungur are attached to Bayramlı.
