= Suludere, Şirvan =

Village in Siirt Province, Turkey

Suludere
- Village
- Location within Turkey
- Coordinates: 38.132°N 42.103°E
- Country: Turkey
- Province: Siirt
- District: Şirvan
- Population (2021): 39
- Time zone: UTC+3 (TRT)

Suludere (Kurdish: Gundê Dizan, lit. 'the village of the thieves'; Syriac: Gūndīdzāl) (Note: Alternatively transliterated as Gounde-Déghan, Gundediesan, Gunde-Dizan, Gunde-Dizal, Kondudizan, or Kourtétizan.) is a village in the Şirvan District of Siirt Province in Turkey. The village had a population of 39 in 2021.

== History ==
Gūndīdzāl (today called Suludere) was historically inhabited by Syriac Orthodox Christians. In the Syriac Orthodox patriarchal register of dues of 1870, it was recorded that the village had 11 households, who paid 66 dues, and it did not have a church or a priest. According to Raymond Kévorkian, it was populated by Armenian-speaking adherents of the Church of the East. In a letter from Priest Ibrahim to Patriarch Ignatius Abdul Masih II, it is recorded that the village was attacked by about 100 men of the Danabkta kochers led by two sons of the chief of the tribe, Mijdad Agha, on 15 October 1895, amidst the Hamidian massacres, resulting in the killing of three men and a woman. However, an Armenian report details that half of the village's population was killed and the village headman was burned alive, whilst James Henry Monahan, the British Vice-Consul of Bitlis, noted that 12 were killed in an attack by Kurds of the Demli tribe in November 1895, including the village priest, and three families subsequently died of hunger or disease after the massacre. Local Kurds also plundered the village. The surviving villagers converted to Islam, but reconverted to Christianity in the summer of 1896. Monahan recorded that the village had 14 Syriac Orthodox households in 1898, in which year he noted that a number of Syriac Orthodox families from Gūndīdzāl had moved to Bitlis.

== Bibliography ==
- Al-Jeloo, Nicholas (2019). "Who were the Assyrians of Bitlis?". In Mehmet İnbaşı; Mehmet Demirtaş (eds.). Tarihî ve Kültürel Yönleriyle Bitlis. Vol. II. Bitlis Eren Üniversitesi Yayınları. pp. 363–390.
- Bcheiry, Iskandar (2009). The Syriac Orthodox Patriarchal Register of Dues of 1870: An Unpublished Historical Document from the Late Ottoman Period. Gorgias Press.
- Demir Görür, Emel (2020). "İngiliz Konsolos James Henry Monahan'ın Raporlarında Bitlis Vilayeti (1896-1898)". Akademik Bakış (in Turkish). 13 (26): 244–266. doi:10.19060/gav.750472.
- Dinno, Khalid S. (2017). The Syrian Orthodox Christians in the Late Ottoman Period and Beyond: Crisis then Revival. Gorgias Press.
- Verheij, Jelle (2017). ""The year of the firman:" The 1895 massacres in Hizan and Şirvan (Bitlis vilayet)". Études arméniennes contemporaines. 10 (10): 125–159.
