= Kömürlü, Şirvan =

Village in Siirt Province, Turkey

Kömürlü
- Village
- Location within Turkey
- Coordinates: 38.138°N 41.944°E
- Country: Turkey
- Province: Siirt
- District: Şirvan
- Population (2021): 299
- Time zone: UTC+3 (TRT)

Kömürlü (Kurdish: Sirs) is a village in the Şirvan District of Siirt Province in Turkey. The village is populated by Kurds and had a population of 299 in 2021.

The hamlets of Yaygın and Yeken are attached to Kömürlü.

The village was depopulated in the 1990s.
