= Çimencik, Eruh =

Village in Siirt Province, Turkey

Çimencik
- Village
- Location within Turkey
- Coordinates: 37.677°N 41.961°E
- Country: Turkey
- Province: Siirt
- District: Eruh
- Population (2021): 42
- Time zone: UTC+3 (TRT)

Çimencik (Kurdish: Tille) is a village in the Eruh District of Siirt Province in Turkey. The village is populated by Kurds of the Jilyan tribe and had a population of 42 in 2021.
