= Durankaya, Şirvan =

Village in Siirt Province, Turkey

Durankaya
- Village
- Location within Turkey
- Coordinates: 37.985°N 42.180°E
- Country: Turkey
- Province: Siirt
- District: Şirvan
- Population (2021): 548
- Time zone: UTC+3 (TRT)

Durankaya (Kurdish: Gelî) is a village in the Şirvan District of Siirt Province in Turkey. The village had a population of 548 in 2021.

The hamlets of Ozdoğan, Sevinç and Sevindik are attached to the village.
