= Gürgöze, Kurtalan =

Village in Siirt Province, Turkey

Gürgöze
- Village
- Location within Turkey
- Coordinates: 37.922°N 41.661°E
- Country: Turkey
- Province: Siirt
- District: Kurtalan
- Population (2021): 505
- Time zone: UTC+3 (TRT)

Gürgöze (Kurdish: Eynik) is a village in the Kurtalan District of Siirt Province in Turkey. The village is populated by Kurds of the Pencenarî tribe and had a population of 505 in 2021.

The hamlet of Kuyucak is attached to the village.
