= Meşecik, Şirvan =

Village in Siirt Province, Turkey

Meşecik
- Village
- Location within Turkey
- Coordinates: 38.100°N 42.207°E
- Country: Turkey
- Province: Siirt
- District: Şirvan
- Population (2021): 21
- Time zone: UTC+3 (TRT)

Meşecik (Kurdish: Maveka) is a village in the Şirvan District of Siirt Province in Turkey. The village had a population of 21 in 2021.
