= Akyokuş, Şirvan =

Village in Siirt Province, Turkey

Akyokuş
- Village
- Location in Turkey
- Coordinates: 38.087°N 42.192°E
- Country: Turkey
- Province: Siirt
- District: Şirvan
- Population (2021): 29
- Time zone: UTC+3 (TRT)

Akyokuş (Kurdish: Zuzeht) is a village in the Şirvan District of Siirt Province in Turkey. The village is populated by Kurds of the Sturkiyan tribe and had a population of 29 in 2021.
