= Payamlı, Eruh =

Village in Siirt Province, Turkey

Payamlı
- Village
- Location within Turkey
- Coordinates: 37.762°N 41.959°E
- Country: Turkey
- Province: Siirt
- District: Eruh
- Population (2021): 127
- Time zone: UTC+3 (TRT)

Payamlı (Kurdish: Deravit) is a village in the Eruh District of Siirt Province in Turkey. The village is populated by Kurds of the Botikan tribe and had a population of 127 in 2021.

The hamlet of Taşdibek is attached to the village.
