= Tatlı, Kurtalan =

Village in Siirt Province, Turkey

Tatlı
- Village
- Location within Turkey
- Coordinates: 37.759°N 41.786°E
- Country: Turkey
- Province: Siirt
- District: Kurtalan
- Population (2021): 75
- Time zone: UTC+3 (TRT)

Tatlı (Kurdish: Kozik) is a village in the Kurtalan District of Siirt Province in Turkey. The village had a population of 75 in 2021.
