= Soğanlı, Şirvan =

Village in Siirt Province, Turkey

Soğanlı
- Village
- Location within Turkey
- Coordinates: 38.056°N 42.139°E
- Country: Turkey
- Province: Siirt
- District: Şirvan
- Population (2021): 123
- Time zone: UTC+3 (TRT)

Soğanlı (Kurdish: Miskin) is a village in the Şirvan District of Siirt Province in Turkey. The village had a population of 123 in 2021.
