= Yürekveren, Kurtalan =

Village in Siirt Province, Turkey

Yürekveren
- Village
- Location within Turkey
- Coordinates: 37.897°N 41.761°E
- Country: Turkey
- Province: Siirt
- District: Kurtalan
- Population (2021): 73
- Time zone: UTC+3 (TRT)

Yürekveren (Kurdish: Binof) is a village in the Kurtalan District of Siirt Province in Turkey. The village is populated by Kurds of the Pencenarî tribe and had a population of 73 in 2021.

The hamlet of Mağralı is attached to the village.
