= Doğruca, Şirvan =

Village in Siirt Province, Turkey

Doğruca
- Village
- Location within Turkey
- Coordinates: 38.069°N 42.271°E
- Country: Turkey
- Province: Siirt
- District: Şirvan
- Population (2021): 59
- Time zone: UTC+3 (TRT)

Doğruca (Kurdish: Ende) is a village in the Şirvan District of Siirt Province in Turkey. The village is populated by Kurds and had a population of 59 in 2021.

It was burned by authorities in the early 1990s, during the Kurdish–Turkish conflict.
