= Ballıkaya, Kurtalan =

Village in Siirt Province, Turkey

Ballıkaya
- Village
- Location within Turkey
- Coordinates: 38.021°N 41.577°E
- Country: Turkey
- Province: Siirt
- District: Kurtalan
- Population (2021): 395
- Time zone: UTC+3 (TRT)

Ballıkaya (Kurdish: Badê) is a village in the Kurtalan District of Siirt Province in Turkey. The village is populated by Kurds of the Elîkan tribe and had a population of 395 in 2021.

The hamlet of Yuvalı is attached to the village.
