= Kirazlı, Şirvan =

Village in Siirt Province, Turkey

Kirazlı
- Village
- Location within Turkey
- Coordinates: 38.074°N 42.172°E
- Country: Turkey
- Province: Siirt
- District: Şirvan
- Population (2021): 138
- Time zone: UTC+3 (TRT)

Kirazlı (Kurdish: Hevkes) is a village in the Şirvan District of Siirt Province in Turkey. The village is populated by Kurds of the Sturkiyan tribe and had a population of 138 in 2021.
