= Suluyazı, Şirvan =

Village in Siirt Province, Turkey

Suluyazı
- Village
- Location within Turkey
- Coordinates: 38.133°N 42.121°E
- Country: Turkey
- Province: Siirt
- District: Şirvan
- Population (2021): 128
- Time zone: UTC+3 (TRT)

Suluyazı (Kurdish: Merç; Syriac: Al-Mareğ) (Note: Also spelt as al-Marj, Marj, or Merj.) is a village in the Şirvan District of Siirt Province in Turkey. The village is populated by Kurds and had a population of 128 in 2021.

The hamlets of Akgedik and Çampınar are attached to the village.

== History ==
Al-Mareğ (today called Suluyazı) was historically inhabited by Syriac Orthodox Christians. In the Syriac Orthodox patriarchal register of dues of 1870, it was recorded that the village had 14 households, who paid 53 dues, and it did not have a church or a priest. Amidst the Hamidian massacres, it was attacked by about 100 men of the Danabkta kochers led by two sons of the chief of the tribe, Mijdad Agha, on 15 October 1895. Two men were killed and all nine families converted to Islam. Some families subsequently returned to Christianity. Afterwards, seven families fled the village whilst two families remained and were still Muslim by 1898. It was settled by some Kurdish families. The village was depopulated in the 1990s.

== Bibliography ==
- Bcheiry, Iskandar (2009). The Syriac Orthodox Patriarchal Register of Dues of 1870: An Unpublished Historical Document from the Late Ottoman Period. Gorgias Press.
- Bcheiry, Iskandar (2019). "Digitizing and Schematizing the Archival Material from the Late Ottoman Period Found in the Monastery of al-Zaʿfarān in Southeast Turkey". Atla Summary of Proceedings. 72 (January): 50–61. doi:10.31046/proceedings.2018.113.
- Demir Görür, Emel (2020). "İngiliz Konsolos James Henry Monahan'ın Raporlarında Bitlis Vilayeti (1896-1898)". Akademik Bakış (in Turkish). 13 (26): 244–266. doi:10.19060/gav.750472.
- Dinno, Khalid S. (2017). The Syrian Orthodox Christians in the Late Ottoman Period and Beyond: Crisis then Revival. Gorgias Press.
- Verheij, Jelle (2017). ""The year of the firman:" The 1895 massacres in Hizan and Şirvan (Bitlis vilayet)". Études arméniennes contemporaines. 10 (10): 125–159.
- Sugden, Jonathan (2005). Turkey "still Critical": Prospects in 2005 for Internally Displaced Kurds in Turkey. Human Rights Watch.
