= Bozhüyük, Kurtalan =

Village in Siirt Province, Turkey

Bozhöyük
- Village
- Location within Turkey
- Coordinates: 37.981°N 41.412°E
- Country: Turkey
- Province: Siirt
- District: Kurtalan
- Population (2021): 522
- Time zone: UTC+3 (TRT)

Bozhüyük (Kurdish: Teliba) is a village in the Kurtalan District of Siirt Province in Turkey. The village is populated by Kurds and had a population of 522 in 2021.
