= Yamaçlı, Şirvan =

Village in Siirt Province, Turkey

Yamaçlı
- Village
- Location within Turkey
- Coordinates: 38.182°N 42.191°E
- Country: Turkey
- Province: Siirt
- District: Şirvan
- Population (2021): 315
- Time zone: UTC+3 (TRT)

Yamaçlı (Kurdish: Birvîr) is a village in the Şirvan District of Siirt Province in Turkey. The village had a population of 315 in 2021.

The hamlets of Ardıtaş and Bardacık are attached to Yamaçlı.
