= Gülburnu, Eruh =

Village in Siirt Province, Turkey

Gülburnu
- Village
- Location within Turkey
- Coordinates: 37.648°N 42.091°E
- Country: Turkey
- Province: Siirt
- District: Eruh
- Population (2021): 97
- Time zone: UTC+3 (TRT)

Gülburnu (Kurdish: Şişil) is a village in the Eruh District of Siirt Province in Turkey. The village is populated by Kurds of the Botikan tribe and had a population of 97 in 2021.
