= Oymakılıç, Eruh =

Village in Siirt Province, Turkey

Oymakılıç
- Village
- Location within Turkey
- Coordinates: 37.796°N 42.007°E
- Country: Turkey
- Province: Siirt
- District: Eruh
- Population (2021): 22
- Time zone: UTC+3 (TRT)

Oymakılıç (Kurdish: Baraşa) is a village in the Eruh District of Siirt Province in Turkey. The village is populated by Kurds of the Botikan tribe and had a population of 22 in 2021.
