= Bölüklü, Eruh =

Village in Siirt Province, Turkey

Bölüklü
- Village
- Location within Turkey
- Coordinates: 37.853°N 42.132°E
- Country: Turkey
- Province: Siirt
- District: Eruh
- Population (2021): 23
- Time zone: UTC+3 (TRT)

Bölüklü (Kurdish: Gezeruk) is a village in the Eruh District of Siirt Province in Turkey. The village is populated by Kurds of the Botikan tribe and had a population of 23 in 2021.
