= Çakıllı, Kurtalan =

Village in Siirt Province, Turkey

Çakıllı
- Village
- Location within Turkey
- Coordinates: 37.946°N 41.427°E
- Country: Turkey
- Province: Siirt
- District: Kurtalan
- Population (2021): 361
- Time zone: UTC+3 (TRT)

Çakıllı (Kurdish: Palonî) is a village in the Kurtalan District of Siirt Province in Turkey. The village had a population of 361 in 2021.
