= Yolbaşı, Şirvan =

Village in Siirt Province, Turkey

Yolbaşı
- Village
- Location within Turkey
- Coordinates: 37.986°N 42.249°E
- Country: Turkey
- Province: Siirt
- District: Şirvan
- Population (2021): 176
- Time zone: UTC+3 (TRT)

Yolbaşı (Kurdish: Kevijan) is a village in the Şirvan District of Siirt Province in Turkey. The village had a population of 176 in 2021.

The hamlet of İncesırt is attached to Yolbaşı.
