= Toytepe, Kurtalan =

Village in Siirt Province, Turkey

Toytepe
- Village
- Location within Turkey
- Coordinates: 37.947°N 41.482°E
- Country: Turkey
- Province: Siirt
- District: Kurtalan
- Population (2021): 163
- Time zone: UTC+3 (TRT)

Toytepe (Kurdish: Merce) is a village in the Kurtalan District of Siirt Province in Turkey. The village is populated by Kurds and had a population of 163 in 2021.

The hamlet of Düzceli is attached to the village.
