= Daltepe, Şirvan =

Village in Siirt Province, Turkey

Daltepe
- Village
- Location within Turkey
- Coordinates: 38.077°N 42.359°E
- Country: Turkey
- Province: Siirt
- District: Şirvan
- Population (2021): 73
- Time zone: UTC+3 (TRT)

Daltepe (Kurdish: Hertawis) is a village in the Şirvan District of Siirt Province in Turkey. The village had a population of 73 in 2021.
