= Çayırlı, Kurtalan =

Village in Siirt Province, Turkey

Çayırlı
- Village
- Location within Turkey
- Coordinates: 37.924°N 41.568°E
- Country: Turkey
- Province: Siirt
- District: Kurtalan
- Population (2021): 72
- Time zone: UTC+3 (TRT)

Çayırlı (Kurdish: Searta; Syriac: S'irtah) is a village in the Kurtalan District of Siirt Province in Turkey. The village had a population of 72 in 2021.

== History ==
S'irtah (today called Çayırlı) was historically inhabited by Syriac Orthodox Christians. In the Syriac Orthodox patriarchal register of dues of 1870, it was recorded that the village had 5 households, who paid 22 dues, and did not have a church or a priest.

== Bibliography ==
- Bcheiry, Iskandar (2009). The Syriac Orthodox Patriarchal Register of Dues of 1870: An Unpublished Historical Document from the Late Ottoman Period. Gorgias Press.
