= Dişlinar, Şirvan =

Village in Siirt Province, Turkey

Dişlinar
- Village
- Location within Turkey
- Coordinates: 37.972°N 42.318°E
- Country: Turkey
- Province: Siirt
- District: Şirvan
- Population (2021): 220
- Time zone: UTC+3 (TRT)

Dişlinar (Kurdish: Zivzik) is a village in the Şirvan District of Siirt Province in Turkey. The village is populated by Kurds and had a population of 220 in 2021.

The village grows pomegranates.
