= Kasımlı, Şirvan =

Village in Siirt Province, Turkey

Kasımlı
- Village
- Location within Turkey
- Coordinates: 38.057°N 41.977°E
- Country: Turkey
- Province: Siirt
- District: Şirvan
- Population (2021): 273
- Time zone: UTC+3 (TRT)

Kasımlı (Kurdish: Tahwan) is a village in the Şirvan District of Siirt Province in Turkey. The village is populated by Kurds of the Silokan tribe and had a population of 273 in 2021.
