= Aksöğüt, Kurtalan =

Village in Siirt Province, Turkey

Aksöğüt
- Village
- Location within Turkey
- Coordinates: 38.045°N 41.587°E
- Country: Turkey
- Province: Siirt
- District: Kurtalan
- Population (2021): 666
- Time zone: UTC+3 (TRT)

Aksöğüt (Kurdish: Dilbe) is a village in the Kurtalan District of Siirt Province in Turkey. The village had a population of 666 in 2021.
