= Akçalı, Kurtalan =

Village in Siirt Province, Turkey

Akçalı
- Village
- Location within Turkey
- Coordinates: 37.939°N 41.763°E
- Country: Turkey
- Province: Siirt
- District: Kurtalan
- Population (2021): 180
- Time zone: UTC+3 (TRT)

Akçalı (Kurdish: Baqird) is a village in the Kurtalan District of Siirt Province in Turkey. The village is populated by Kurds of the Pencenarî tribe and had a population of 180 in 2021.
