= Damlı, Şirvan =

Village in Siirt Province, Turkey

Damlı
- Village
- Location within Turkey
- Coordinates: 37.996°N 42.060°E
- Country: Turkey
- Province: Siirt
- District: Şirvan
- Population (2021): 430
- Time zone: UTC+3 (TRT)

Damlı (Kurdish: Pûlî) is a village in the Şirvan District of Siirt Province in Turkey. The village is populated by Kurds of the Sturkiyan tribe and had a population of 430 in 2021.
