= Ekinli, Kurtalan =

Village in Siirt Province, Turkey

Ekinli
- Village
- Location within Turkey
- Coordinates: 38.006°N 41.478°E
- Country: Turkey
- Province: Siirt
- District: Kurtalan
- Population (2021): 11
- Time zone: UTC+3 (TRT)

Ekinli is a village in the Kurtalan District of Siirt Province in Turkey. The village is populated by Kurds and had a population of 11 in 2021.

The hamlet of Yağızlar is attached to the village.
