= Bağlıca, Kurtalan =

Village in Siirt Province, Turkey

Bağlıca
- Village
- Location within Turkey
- Coordinates: 37.873°N 41.759°E
- Country: Turkey
- Province: Siirt
- District: Kurtalan
- Population (2021): 506
- Time zone: UTC+3 (TRT)

Bağlıca (Kurdish: Siyan) is a village in the Kurtalan District of Siirt Province in Turkey. The village is populated by Kurds of non-tribal affiliation and had a population of 506 in 2021.

The hamlets of Aşağı Dibekli and Yukarı Dibekli are attached to the village.
