= Yanarsu, Kurtalan =

Village in Siirt Province, Turkey

Yanarsu
- Village
- Location within Turkey
- Coordinates: 38.038°N 41.559°E
- Country: Turkey
- Province: Siirt
- District: Kurtalan
- Population (2021): 148
- Time zone: UTC+3 (TRT)

Yanarsu (Kurdish: Zoke; Syriac: Al-Zūq) (Note: Also known as Zūq.) is a village in the Kurtalan District of Siirt Province in Turkey. The village is populated by Kurds and had a population of 148 in 2021.

== History ==
Al-Zūq (today called Yanarsu) was historically inhabited by Syriac Orthodox Christians. In the Syriac Orthodox patriarchal register of dues of 1870, it was recorded that the village had 13 households, who paid 87 dues, and was served by one priest. There was a Syriac Orthodox church of Yūldaṯ Alohō. A diyāqūs (servant of the church) was ordained for the Church of Meryem Ana at Al-Zūq on 16 December 1326 AH by Metropolitan Ilyās.

== Bibliography ==
- Bcheiry, Iskandar (2009). The Syriac Orthodox Patriarchal Register of Dues of 1870: An Unpublished Historical Document from the Late Ottoman Period. Gorgias Press.
- Bcheiry, Iskandar (2023). "A Syriac Orthodox List of Diyāqūs (Servants of the Church) from the Late Ottoman Period" (PDF). The International Journal of Levant Studies. 5: 25–74.
