= Erdurağı, Kurtalan =

Village in Siirt Province, Turkey

Erdurağı
- Village
- Location within Turkey
- Coordinates: 37.901°N 41.575°E
- Country: Turkey
- Province: Siirt
- District: Kurtalan
- Population (2021): 687
- Time zone: UTC+3 (TRT)

Erdurağı (Kurdish: Kelemeran) is a village in the Kurtalan District of Siirt Province in Turkey. The village is populated by Kurds of the Pencenarî tribe and had a population of 687 in 2021.

The hamlets of Arslanlı, Baştepe, Kaynaklı and Sıcaksu are attached to the village.
