= Akçayar, Şirvan =

Village in Siirt Province, Turkey

Akçayar
- Village
- Location within Turkey
- Coordinates: 38.107°N 42.217°E
- Country: Turkey
- Province: Siirt
- District: Şirvan
- Population (2021): 19
- Time zone: UTC+3 (TRT)

Akçayar (Kurdish: Mezra Şêxan) is a village in the Şirvan District of Siirt Province in Turkey. The village is populated by Kurds and had a population of 19 in 2021.

It was burned by authorities in 1995, during the Kurdish–Turkish conflict.
