= Yağcılar, Şirvan =

Village in Siirt Province, Turkey

Yağcılar
- Village
- Location within Turkey
- Coordinates: 38.033°N 42.345°E
- Country: Turkey
- Province: Siirt
- District: Şirvan
- Population (2021): 754
- Time zone: UTC+3 (TRT)

Yağcılar (Kurdish: Sîsam) is a village in the Şirvan District of Siirt Province in Turkey. The village had a population of 754 in 2021.

The hamlets of Asmaladere, Gözlü, Kaynarca and Sütlü are attached to the village.
