= Kayabağlar, Kurtalan =

Town in Siirt Province, Turkey

Kayabağlar
- Municipality
- Location in Turkey
- Coordinates: 37.985°N 41.665°E
- Country: Turkey
- Province: Siirt
- District: Kurtalan
- Population (2021): 5,179
- Time zone: UTC+3 (TRT)

Kayabağlar (Kurdish: Zokayd) is a belde in the Kurtalan District of Siirt Province in Turkey. It had a population of 5,179 in 2021.

It is divided into the neighborhoods of Bağlar, Çeşme and Kayalı.
