= Beykent, Kurtalan =

Village in Siirt Province, Turkey

Beykent
- Village
- Location within Turkey
- Coordinates: 37.883°N 41.686°E
- Country: Turkey
- Province: Siirt
- District: Kurtalan
- Population (2021): 434
- Time zone: UTC+3 (TRT)

Beykent (Kurdish: Beykend, Pekend; Syriac: Bīkand) (Note: Alternatively transliterated as Bekind, Bekinde, Bikin, or Pékinde, Pékionde.) is a village in the Kurtalan District of Siirt Province in Turkey. The village is populated by Kurds of non-tribal affiliation and had a population of 434 in 2021.

== History ==
Bīkand (today called Beykent) was historically inhabited by Syriac Orthodox Christians. The 17th-century monastery of Mar Yoḥannan Naḥlaya, located near Bīkand, came into the ownership of the Syriac Orthodox Church at the beginning of the 19th-century. In the Syriac Orthodox patriarchal register of dues of 1870, it was recorded that the village had 11 households, who paid 39 dues, and it did not have a priest. There was a church of Yūldaṯ Alohō and a church of Morī Barṣawmō. In 1913, there were 80 Chaldean Catholics who were served by one priest and one church as part of the diocese of Seert. It was also populated by 85 households who adhered to the Church of the East. The village's population was exterminated in June 1915 amidst the Sayfo at Siirt.

== Bibliography ==
- Bcheiry, Iskandar (2009). The Syriac Orthodox Patriarchal Register of Dues of 1870: An Unpublished Historical Document from the Late Ottoman Period. Gorgias Press.
- Cibo, Nezire (2016). Kürt tarihinde Garzan ve Pencinariler (1st ed.). İsmail Beşikci Vakfı Yayınları. ISBN 9786059073219.
- Gaunt, David (2006). Massacres, Resistance, Protectors: Muslim-Christian Relations in Eastern Anatolia during World War I. Gorgias Press.
- Wilmshurst, David (2000). The Ecclesiastical Organisation of the Church of the East, 1318–1913 (PDF). Peeters Publishers.
