= Şirvan, Siirt =

Municipality in Siirt Province, Turkey

Şirvan
- Municipality
- Location in Turkey
- Coordinates: 38°03′48″N 42°01′39″E
- Country: Turkey
- Province: Siirt
- District: Şirvan

Government
  - Mayor: Necat Cellek (AKP)
- Population (2021): 3,958
- Time zone: UTC+3 (TRT)
- Website: www.sirvan.bel.tr

Şirvan (Arabic: شروان, Syriac: ܫܝܪܘܢ, romanized: Sherwan, Kurdish: Kufra, Şêrvan, Armenian: Քուֆրա, romanized: Qufra) is a municipality in the Şirvan District of Siirt Province in southeastern Turkey. It is populated by Kurds of the Silokan and Sturkiyan tribes and had a population of 3,958 in 2021.

== Neighborhoods ==
The municipality is divided into the neighborhoods of Bağcılar, Fatih, Kırtepe, Küfre and Sit.

== History ==
Şirvan is attested in the 13th century by Yaqut al-Hamawi in Mu'jam al-Buldan.

Under the Ottoman Empire, Şirvan was a kaza (district) of the sanjak of Siirt in the Bitlis Vilayet, and the village of Küfre (ܫܪܘܐܢ, "village" in Syriac, today called Şirvan) served as its administrative centre. In late 19th century, the district of Şirvan was largely inhabited by Muslim Kurds but was also home to a number of Christian Assyrians and Armenians, who constituted roughly 20% of the total population of the district. Of the total 200-odd settlements in the district, 28 were Christian, most of which were predominantly inhabited by Syriac Orthodox Assyrians, and some were populated by both Christians and Muslims.

As a consequence of the removal of local Kurdish overlords as part of the Ottoman policy of centralisation in the 1830s and 1840s, rural areas in the district were made vulnerable to oppression and exploitation by Kurdish tribes. Christians were also the victim of religious persecution, and led many to emigrate, as well as a small number of Kurds due to economic hardship, and resulted in a gradual process of Kurdification of the district.

By 1895, Küfre was populated by Assyrians and Kurds, with some Armenian families. In the same year, amidst the Hamidian massacres, the village was attacked by Kurdish nomads of the Mahometan (Mehmediyan) and Strugan (Sturkiyan) tribes, allegedly with the permission of the acting kaymakam (district governor), Fatha Bey. It was reported that all Christian houses were looted, and 25 Assyrians and Armenians were killed. As well as this, almost every Christian village in the district was attacked in October–November 1895. James Henry Monahan, British vice-consul of Bitlis, reported that 179 Christians (151 men and 18 women) were killed, however it is suggested that this figure may under-represent the total figure.

In order to avoid future attacks, almost all Assyrians and Armenians ostensibly converted to Islam on the suggestion of sedentary Kurds. The large majority of converts privately reconverted to Christianity within several years after the massacres of 1895, and only three converted villages in the district remained Muslim when visited by Monahan. Oppression of Christians worsened considerably in the aftermath of the massacres, thereby increasing Christian emigration; of 22 villages in the district, over half of the population left.

== Demographics ==
On the eve of the First World War, the Armenian Patriarchate of Constantinople recorded 2,853 Armenians in 19 localities of the kaza of Şirvan, with eleven churches and two schools. Their fate is unknown. According to the 1927 Turkish census, the whole population of 9,467 people was Muslim. However, a number of crypto-Christian villages have endured into the 21st century. The 1927 census records 9,272 native Kurdish speakers, 109 native Turkish speakers, and 66 native Arabic speakers.

== See also ==
- Emirate of Şirvan

== Bibliography ==
- Verheij, Jelle (2017). ""The year of the firman:" The 1895 massacres in Hizan and Şirvan (Bitlis vilayet)". Études arméniennes contemporaines. 10 (10): 125–159.
