= List of municipalities in Siirt Province =

This is the List of municipalities in Siirt Province, Turkey as of March 2023.

District	Municipality
Baykan	Atabağı
Baykan	Baykan
Baykan	Veyselkarani
Eruh	Eruh
Kurtalan	Kayabağlar
Kurtalan	Kurtalan
Pervari	Beğendik
Pervari	Pervari
Siirt	Gökçebağ
Siirt	Siirt
Şirvan	Şirvan
Tillo	Tillo
