= Siirt Airport =

Siirt Airport Siirt Havalimanı
- IATA: SXZ; ICAO: LTCL

Summary
- Airport type: Public
- Operator: General Directorate of State Airports Authority
- Serves: Siirt, Turkey
- Location: Siirt, Turkey
- Opened: 1998; 28 years ago
- Elevation AMSL: 2,000 ft / 610 m
- Coordinates: 37°58′41″N 41°50′21″E
- Website: www.dhmi.gov.tr

Map
- Location of airport in Turkey

Runways
Direction	Length		Surface
Direction	ft	m	Surface
06/24	6,561	2,000	Asphalt

Statistics (2025)
- Annual passenger capacity: 250,000
- Passengers: 65,517
- Passenger change 2024–25: ▼10%
- Aircraft movements: 596
- Movements change 2024–25: ▼19%

Siirt Airport (IATA: SXZ, ICAO: LTCL) is an airport in Siirt, the city in Southeastern Anatolian region of Turkey.

Airport is close to Pınarova, Pınarca, Aktaş, Tuzkuyusu, and Köprübaşı villages.

== Airlines and destinations ==
The following airlines operate regular scheduled and charter flights at Siirt Airport:

Airlines	Destinations
AJet	Ankara
Turkish Airlines	Istanbul

== Traffic statistics ==
Siirt Airport passenger traffic statistics
Year (months)	Domestic	% change	International	% change	Total	% change
2025	65,517	▼10%	-	-	65,517	▼10%
2024	72,606	▲16%	-	-	72,606	▲16%
2023	62,711	▲23%	-	-	62,711	▲23%
2022	50,918	▲11%	-	-	50,918	▲11%
2021	45,840	▲37%	-	-	45,840	▲37%
2020	33,568	▼3%	-	-	33,568	▼3%
2019	34,718	-	-	-	34,718	-
2018	-	▼100%	-	-	-	▼100%
2017	22,674	▼77%	-	-	22,674	▼77%
2016	97,912	▲47%	-	-	97,912	▲47%
2015	66,753	▲242%	-	-	66,753	▲242%
2014	19,526	▲16%	-	-	19,526	▲38%
2013	16,896	▼50%	-	-	16,896	▼50%
2012	33,740	▲7%	-	-	33,740	▲7%
2011	31,420	▲3253%	-	-	31,420	▲3253%
2010	937	-	-	-	937	-
2009	-	▼100%	-	-	-	▼100%
2008	12,581	▼12%	-	-	12,581	▼12%
2007	14,278	Steady	-	Steady	14,278	Steady
