= Çetin Dam =

- Location within Turkey
- Country: Turkey
- Location: Pervari and Şirvan districts, Siirt Province
- Coordinates: 37°58′27″N 42°22′42″E
- Purpose: Power
- Status: Operational
- Construction began: December 2011
- Opening date: May 2020
- Construction cost: US$678 million

Dam and spillways
- Type of dam: Embankment, roller-compacted concrete
- Impounds: Botan River
- Height (foundation): 165 m
- Height (thalweg): 143 m
- Length: 492 m (1,614 ft)
- Elevation at crest: 825 m
- Width (crest): 10 m
- Dam volume: 4 726 527 m^{3}

Reservoir
- Total capacity: 615 million m^{3}
- Surface area: 10 km^{2} (4 mi^{2})
- Maximum length: 37 km

Power Station
- Commission date: May 2020
- Hydraulic head: 140 m (459 ft)
- Turbines: 3 x 135 MW + 1 x 15 MW Francis-type
- Installed capacity: 420 MW
- Annual generation: 1175 GW·h

The Çetin Dam hydropower dam, on the Botan River in Siirt Province, Turkey, with an installed capacity of 420 MW. It was completed in 2020.

== Location ==
The dam will be located directly downstream of the Botan and Büyük River confluence. Also part of the Çetin project is a smaller dam 6 km (4 mi) downstream with 45 m (148 ft) in height. The Çetin lower dam will regulate outflows from the Çetin main dam and also produce hydroelectric power with a 112 MW capacity via two 56 MW Kaplan turbines.

Overall, six dams are to be built on the Botan River, among which Çetin dam will have the largest power plant.

== Design ==
Çetin Dam is a roller-compacted concrete body embankment dam. With a volume exceeding 4.7 million m^{3}, il will be the biggest of its kind in Turkey, and bigger than any existing RCC dam in Europe. The dam will be 165 m high and create a 615 million m^{3} reservoir.

The dam's power plant will house four vertical axis Francis turbine-generators, three of them with a 135 MW capacity and a smaller 15 MW one.

== Funding ==
The owner was the Norwegian, Statkraft, at a cost of US $678 million. The Contractor was Yϋksel-iLci Joint Venture. Veidekke Industri AS was the subcontractor for Cetin dam. In September 2017, Limak invested $400 million to purchase the rights, in order to complete the whole project by 2020–21.

== Timeline ==
Construction on the main dam began in December 2011 and the power plant was first expected to be complete in 2015, with a planned capacity of 401 MW.

The project experienced delays due to Kurdistan Workers' Party attacks on the construction site and equipment. In February 2016, Statkraft suspended construction. Works resumed in July 2017.

Construction was 84% complete as of September 2019 ; at that time, as many as 15,000 m^{3} of concrete are poured onto the structure every day.

The dam started impounding water in January 2020. The first two units of the power station started generating electricity in April 2020, whereas the two remaining ones are expected to be commissioned by May 2020.

== See also ==
- Alkumru Dam – downstream, completed in 2011
