= Beğendik Bridge =

Road bridge in Turkey

Beğendik Bridge Beğendik Köprüsü
- Coordinates: 37°57′52″N 42°38′56″E
- Carries: Motor vehicles
- Crosses: Botan River
- Locale: Beğendik, Pervari, Siirt, Turkey

Characteristics
- Design: Suspension type Balanced Cantilever
- Material: Concrete
- Total length: 450 m (1,480 ft)
- Width: 14 m (46 ft)
- Height: 165 m (541 ft)
- Longest span: 210 m (690 ft)
- No. of spans: 3
- Piers in water: 2
- No. of lanes: 2

History
- Construction start: 2014
- Construction end: November 2019
- Construction cost: ₺ 100 million
- Inaugurated: 11 July 2020; 6 years ago

Location
- Interactive map of Beğendik Bridge

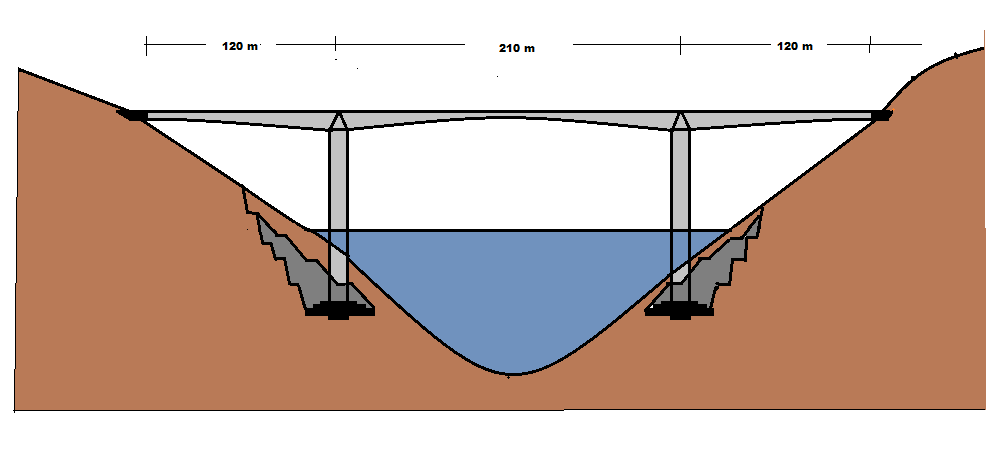
Concrete balanced cantilever Beğendik Bridge in Siirt Province, Turkey

Beğendik Bridge (Turkish: Beğendik Köprüsü), also known as Botan Bridge, is a road bridge crossing the Botan River at Beğendik in Siirt Province in southeastern Turkey. Inaugurated in 2020, it is Turkey's highest and longest main-span bridge.

== History ==
The construction of the bridge was projected in the 1970s. The construction works for the bridge and the roads, which started in 1998, progressed slow in particular due to the actions of terrorist organizations in the region. The construction works started again in 2014.

During the construction phase of the north structure, in mid December 2017, the 50 m (160 ft) long final segment of the beam broke off and fell into the gorge. About three months later, in March 2018, the remaining north structure imploded, causing the north pier and the deck to collapse and fall to the valley slope. The incidents delayed the completion date, which had been set for the end of 2018.

The bridge was completed early November 2019, and was opened to road traffic on 11 July 2020. The bridge connects the Van-Tatvan-Bitlis with Siirt-Mardin-Batman provincial road line P.56-06.

== Characteristics ==
Crossing the Botan River south of Beğendik town in Pervari district of Siirt Province, Southeastern Anatolia, it is a suspension type concrete balanced cantilever bridge. The two-lane bridge is in total 450 m (1,480 ft) long and 14 m (46 ft) wide. It has the longest central span, at 210 m (690 ft), of any balanced cantilever bridge in Turkey. It is also the country's highest bridge at 165 m (541 ft) above ground.

The construction of Beğendik Bridge was part of a ₺ 1.510 billion investment project launched in 1998 to connect Küçüksu, Tatvan in Bitlis Province via Hizan Junction with Pervari on a 72 km (45 mi) long provincial road. This road, with bridge and tunnels, replaces the former very dangerous and long road with hairpin turns winding in high elevation mountainous terrain. Through the Beğendik Bridge, cargo transport between Iran and Iraq takes three hours instead of six hours before. The travel time between Van and Pervari decreased from about five hours to nearly two hours on a safety and comfortable route. The distance between Beğendik and Pervari shortened 8 km (5.0 mi).

A workforce of total 1,025, of which 255 were from Beğendik town, was employed during the construction. The bridge cost ₺ 100 million.
