= Narsuyu, Pervari =

Kurdish Village in Siirt Province, Turkey

Narsuyu
- Village
- Location within Turkey
- Coordinates: 37.960°N 42.515°E
- Country: Turkey
- Province: Siirt
- District: Pervari
- Population (2021): 296
- Time zone: UTC+3 (TRT)

Narsuyu (Kurdish: Kêpê; Syriac: Kīb) (Note: Also spelt as Kibb.) is a village in the Pervari District of Siirt Province in Turkey. The village is populated by Kurds and had a population of 296 in 2021. It is located in the Botan valley.

== History ==
Kīb (today called Narsuyu) was historically inhabited by Chaldean Catholics. Most of the Chaldean Catholics in the village converted to Islam amidst the Hamidian massacres in 1895. In 1913, it was populated by 50 Chaldean Catholics, who had one church, but no priests, as part of the Chaldean Catholic Eparchy of Seert. It was depopulated in the 1990s.

== Bibliography ==
- Botî, Evdila (2012). Ferhenga Sêrtê. Istanbul: Siirt Belediyesi.
- Gaunt, David (2006). Massacres, Resistance, Protectors: Muslim-Christian Relations in Eastern Anatolia during World War I. Gorgias Press.
- Sugden, Jonathan (2005). Turkey "still Critical": Prospects in 2005 for Internally Displaced Kurds in Turkey. Human Rights Watch.
- Wilmshurst, David (2000). The Ecclesiastical Organisation of the Church of the East, 1318–1913 (PDF). Peeters Publishers.
