= Taşdibek, Pervari =

Village in Siirt Province, Turkey

Taşdibek
- Village
- Location within Turkey
- Coordinates: 37.950°N 42.295°E
- Country: Turkey
- Province: Siirt
- District: Pervari
- Population (2021): 655
- Time zone: UTC+3 (TRT)

Taşdibek (Kurdish: Pîroz; Syriac: Pīrōz) (Note: Also spelt as Péroz, Peroz, Piron, Piros, or Piroze.) is a village in the Pervari District of Siirt Province in Turkey. The village is populated by Kurds of the Botikan tribe and had a population of 655 in 2021. It is located in the Botan valley.

The hamlets of Arıca and Çingırak are attached to the village.

== History ==
Pīrōz (today called Taşdibek) was historically inhabited by adherents of the Church of the East and Chaldean Catholics. Peter Mīkhā'īl Bartatar of Khosrowa, Chaldean Catholic metropolitan of Seert, died at the village in 1884. In the same year, Stephen Yōḥannān Qaynāyā, superior of the Monastery of Mār Ya‘qōb the Recluse, visited the village with the priest Paul al-Jādir of Seert and a detachment of Turkish soldiers to convince the villagers to return the body of Peter Mīkhā'īl Bartatar of Khosrowa for burial at Seert.

In 1913, it was populated by 300 Chaldean Catholics, who were served by the Church of Mart Shmūni and one priest as part of the Chaldean Catholic Eparchy of Seert. According to Agha Petros's list, there were 62 households that belonged to the Church of the East as part of the district of Ispirad. Amidst the Sayfo, the village's inhabitants were killed in early June 1915 by the aghas of Aro and their bands. The Christian population endured until 1968, in which year they took refuge at Midyat until 1972, before moving to Istanbul for five years, and then on to France in 1980.

== Bibliography ==
- Botî, Evdila (2012). Ferhenga Sêrtê. Istanbul: Siirt Belediyesi.
- Gaunt, David (2006). Massacres, Resistance, Protectors: Muslim-Christian Relations in Eastern Anatolia during World War I. Gorgias Press.
- Wilmshurst, David (2000). The Ecclesiastical Organisation of the Church of the East, 1318–1913 (PDF). Peeters Publishers.
- Yacoub, Joseph (2016). Year of the Sword: The Assyrian Christian Genocide, A History. Translated by James Ferguson. Oxford University Press.
