= Karasungur, Pervari =

Village in Siirt Province, Turkey

Karasungur
- Village
- Location within Turkey
- Coordinates: 37.884°N 42.340°E
- Country: Turkey
- Province: Siirt
- District: Pervari
- Population (2021): 856
- Time zone: UTC+3 (TRT)

Karasungur (Kurdish: Beruk, Berûk) is a village in the Pervari District of Siirt Province in Turkey. The village had a population of 856 in 2021. The village is Kurdish.

It is located in the Botan River basin.

== History ==
The village formerly adhered to the Qadiriyya order but turned to the Naqshbandi order as it spread throughout the region.
