= Chaldean Catholic Eparchy of Seert =

Turkish diocese of the Chaldean Catholic Church

Seert and the surrounding areas, at the beginning of the 20th century

Chaldean Catholic Eparchy of Seert was a diocese of the Chaldean Catholic Church, centered in Seert. It existed during the eighteenth, nineteenth and early-twentieth centuries. The diocese ceased to exist during the Sayfo (Assyrian genocide) after the murder of its final archbishop, Addai Sher, on 21 June 1915.

== Early Chaldean and Nestorian bishops of Seert ==
There is no evidence for an East Syrian bishop or metropolitan of Seert before the schism of 1551. From just before the end of the fifteenth century Seert seems to have been under the jurisdiction of the metropolitan Eliya of Nisibis, who was styled 'metropolitan of Nisibis, Mardin, Amid, Hesna d'Kifa and Seert' in a colophon of 1477; 'metropolitan of Nisibis, Armenia, Amid, Hesna d'Kifa and Seert' in 1480; and 'metropolitan of Nisibis, Armenia, Mardin, Amid, Seert and Hesna d'Kifa' in 1483. In 1504 another Eliya, perhaps the same man, was styled 'metropolitan of Amid, Gazarta and Seert' in the colophon of a manuscript copied in the monastery of Mar Yaʿqob.

According to Tfinkdji, followed by Fiey, the first bishop or metropolitan of Seert was Joseph, brother of the patriarch Yohannan Sulaqa, who would have been among the bishops consecrated by Sulaqa in 1554. The source for this assertion is not clear, and it is possible that Joseph was instead metropolitan of Gazarta, where a metropolitan of that name is attested between 1555 and 1568. In any case, Joseph Sulaqa did not remain long in his office. In 1555 he was sent to India with Eliya Asmar by the patriarch ʿAbdishoʿ IV and was there consecrated metropolitan of India. He did not return to Mesopotamia, and after struggling for several years to maintain his authority in the face of harassment by the Portuguese authorities, he died in 1569 in or on his way to Rome.

Although there are no references to a bishop of Seert in manuscript colophons from the second half of the sixteenth century, the monastery of Mar Yaʿqob in the Seert district was the seat of the patriarch ʿAbdishoʿ IV Maron and his successor Shemʿon VIII Yahballaha, and a number of manuscripts were copied there by ʿAbdishoʿ himself and by the Catholic metropolitans Eliya Asmar of Amid and Hnanishoʿ of Mardin. The district would therefore have come under strong Catholic influence at this period, and it is not surprising to find Seert listed by ʿAbdishoʿ IV in 1562 as a metropolitan see under his jurisdiction, with a suffragan bishop at 'Azzen', possibly Hesna d'Kifa.

According to Peter Strozza, the Catholic patriarch Shemʿon IX Denha (1580–1600) was archbishop of Jilu and Seert before his election, and therefore might have been consecrated by ʿAbdishoʿ IV. His letter of 1580 written to pope Gregory XIII shortly after his election was witnessed, among others, by the bishops Sargis of Jilu and Joseph of Seert, both probably consecrated by the new patriarch.

The witnesses of Eliya VI's profession of faith in 1586 did not include a metropolitan of Seert, but a metropolitan of Seert named Mar Yaʿqob, 'superior of the monastery of Seert', is mentioned by Leonard Abel in 1587 as among 'the more lettered men of the Nestorian nation'.

The metropolitan Eliya Bar Tappe, dependent on the patriarch Eliya VII (1591-1617), is mentioned under a variety of titles in the dating formulas or colophons of several manuscripts between 1599 and 1618. He resided at the monastery of Mar Yaʿqob throughout his reign, and was primarily responsible for the diocese of Seert, though he clearly had responsibilities for Amid, Gazarta and Hezzo also, and was regarded as their metropolitan for at least part of his reign. He is mentioned as metropolitan of Amid in the report of 1607, and was among the recipients of a letter of Peter Strozza in 1614. He was present at the synod of Amid in 1616 with the metropolitans of Amid and Gazarta, and was on that occasion styled simply metropolitan of Seert.

The dating formula of a manuscript copied in the monastery of Mar Yaʿqob in 1612 mentions the patriarch Eliya VII and 'the metropolitans Mar Eliya and Mar Gabriel'. Mar Gabriel is probably to be identified with the metropolitan Gabriel of Hesna d'Kifa, attested between 1607 and 1617, and there is no need to suppose that Seert had two metropolitans at this period.

Eliya Bar Tappe died on 1 March 1618, the third Sunday of Lent, and was buried in the monastery of Mar Yaʿqob the Recluse near Seert. He was succeeded as metropolitan by his nephew Ishoʿyahb, who built the sanctuary door of the monastery of Mar Yaʿqob in 1619. Ishoʿyahb's jurisdiction also seems to have been wider than Seert itself, and he is mentioned under a variety of titles in the dating formulas of manuscripts copied between 1618 and 1628.

A metropolitan named Eliya, 'nephew of Mar Ishoʿyahb', died on the Friday of Saint John the Baptist, 1660.

A metropolitan of Seert named Yohannan was one of the signatories of a letter of 22 November 1669 from the Patriarch Eliya IX (1660-1700) to pope Clement IX.

He was probably succeeded by the metropolitan Shemʿon Bar Tappe, attested in September 1702, when a manuscript was copied for the bishop 'Mar Shemʿon, of the Tappe family, living in the monastery of Mar Yaʿqob'. Tfinkdji, followed by Fiey, confused him with his Catholic namesake Shemʿon Kemo (see below), and placed his death in 1742. He was probably a Nestorian bishop dependent on the Eliya line, and is not mentioned again, unless he is the unnamed 'heretic bishop' who recovered two villages of Seert from Shemʿon Kemo in 1738.

== The Chaldean bishops of Seert ==
In 1730, shortly before his departure for Rome, Joseph III consecrated a Catholic bishop for Seert, Yohannan Shemʿon Kemo, who appears to have been a native of the Seert village of Seduh. During Joseph's absence in Rome Shemʿon acted as his patriarchal vicar, and had to combat a fierce Nestorian reaction in his diocese in 1738, in which two villages were recovered from the Catholics by a 'heretic bishop' while he was administering the patriarchate in Amid. Two of his letters imploring the patriarch to return from Rome, written on 28 December 1737 and 5 March 1739 respectively, have survived in the Vatican archives. He was also the scribe of two manuscripts in the Seert collection, one of which was copied in 1746. He is said by Tfinkdji to have governed his diocese for more than forty years, but it is not known when he died.

Peter Shawriz of Seert, nephew of Mikha'il Shawriz, bishop of Mardin, was consecrated metropolitan of Seert in 1801 by the metropolitan and natar kursya Hnanishoʿ, nephew of the patriarch Eliya XII (d. 1804). He travelled to Rome in 1806 to secure the confirmation of his appointment, but was frustrated for several years by the French occupation. On his eventual return from Rome he met Henry Leeves of the British and Foreign Bible Society and the British embassy chaplain Robert Walsh in Constantinople in 1822, and the information he provided encouraged Leeves to contact the mountain Nestorians. As a result of this association he was deposed from his diocese by the Vatican in 1823, and was then employed by Leeves as an agent of the Society, visiting the patriarch Shemʿon XVII Abraham in 1824 with Syriac copies of the Psalms and the New Testament. He died at Khosrowa in 1831.

He was succeeded by the Rabban Hormizd monk Mikha'il Kattula of Telkepe, one of the many opponents of Yohannan VIII Hormizd, who was consecrated in 1826 by Joseph V. He died in 1855 and was buried in the monastery of Mar Yaʿqob.

He was succeeded by Peter Mikha'il Bartatar of Khosrowa, who had been educated by the Propaganda and served as a priest at Baghdad and then at Mosul before his ordination. He was consecrated by the patriarch Joseph VI Audo on 7 November 1858, and was present with the patriarch at the First Vatican Council. He retired to the monastery of Mar Guriya in 1878 following a dispute with the newly elected patriarch Eliya Abulyonan, and died in the village of Piroz in 1885.

He was succeeded in 1885 by Yaʿqob Mikha'il Naʿmo of Mosul, who became a priest in 1863, was appointed first director of the patriarchal seminary in Mosul in 1867, and became patriarchal vicar at Baghdad in 1875. He retired either in 1888 or 1891, and died at Baghdad in 1895. The future patriarch Joseph Emmanuel Thomas, who was born in Alqosh in 1852 and became a priest in 1879, succeeded him as metropolitan of Seert in either 1890 (De Clerq) or 1892 (Fiey), remaining there until his election as patriarch in 1900.

The last Chaldean metropolitan of Seert was the scholar Addaï Scher (1902–15), whose many achievements included cataloguing the East Syrian manuscript collections of Seert, Amid, Mardin, Mosul and Alqosh, and editing for publication the Chronicle of Seert, a most important historical source for East Syrian Christianity under the Sassanians and the early caliphs. He was also the author of Épisodes de l'histoire du Kurdistan and other scholarly articles on the history of the Church of the East. He was murdered on 20 June 1915 during the massacre of Christians in the Seert district, and it is said his final hours were spent in an attempt to conceal the precious collection of manuscripts in the monastery of Mar Yaʿqob. The debt which all modern scholars of the Church of the East owe to Scher was expressed by Fiey:

La catastrophe finale de 1915 est encore toute proche de nous. De ce drame humain on ne peut évidemment décider ce qui fut le plus tragique. Hélas! ce n'est plus dans un Journal scientifique, ni avec de l'encre qu'Addaï Scher aura écrit ce dernier des Épisodes de l'histoire du Kurdistan.

== Population statistics ==
The Anglican missionary George Percy Badger was unable to gather detailed statistics in respect of the Chaldean diocese of Seert, but he said that it consisted of eleven villages, and estimated that the diocese contained 12 churches, 9 priests and 300 Chaldean families. In 1852 Marchi estimated the Chaldean population of the diocese at 1,865 persons.

In 1888 the population of the diocese (Seert and 33 villages) was estimated at between 3,500 and 4,000 Chaldeans (P. Müller-Simonis and H. Hyvernat), and in 1891 at 2,600 Chaldeans (Cuinet).

In 1896 the diocese had a population of 5,000 Chaldeans, and contained 22 parishes (plus a further 15 Nestorian villages in the process of conversion to Catholicism), 21 churches, and 17 priests (Chabot).

In 1913 the diocese contained 37 villages, with 5,430 believers, 21 priests, 31 churches, 7 chapels, 9 schools and 4 mission stations (Tfinkdji).

Table 1: Chaldean communities in the diocese of Seert, 1913

Name of Village	Name in Syriac	Number of Believers	Number of Priests	Number of Churches
Seert		824	3	1
Kitmis		326	1	1
Mar Guriya		182	1	1
Gadyanis		55	1	1
Tel Imshar		290	1	1
Bingov		110	1	1
Birkah		30	0	1
Dohuk		146	1	1
Ramuran		126	0	0
Deir Rabban		142	0	0
Deir Mazzen		152	0	0
Arjiqanis		45	0	1
Korij		100	1	1
Urij		20	0	1
Borm		282	1	1
Hwitha		95	0	1
Rawma		110	0	1
Hah		70	0	1
Piroz		300	1	1

Name of Village	Name in Syriac	Number of Believers	Number of Priests	Number of Churches
Tentas		80	1	0
Artun (Upper)		310	1	1
Artun (Lower)		160	0	0
Gurbatanes		75	0	1
Tal		50	0	1
Azar		50	1	1
Gweri Atel		100	0	1
Maranish		60	0	1
Marshanis		60	0	1
Seduh		230	1	1
Mar Yaqob		200	1	1
Mart Shmuni		30	0	0
Hadide		200	1	1
Birke		120	1	1
Bekinde		80	1	1
Deir Shemesh		40	0	1
Kib		50	0	1
Ejnith		120	1	0
Total		5,430	21	31

== Sources ==
- Assemani, Giuseppe Simone (1719). Bibliotheca orientalis clementino-vaticana. Vol. 1. Roma.
- Baaba, Youel A., The Assyrian Homeland before World War I (Alamo, California, 2009)
- Badger, George Percy (1852). The Nestorians and Their Rituals. Vol. 1. London: Joseph Masters.
- Badger, George Percy (1852). The Nestorians and Their Rituals. Vol. 2. London: Joseph Masters. ISBN 978-0-7905-4482-3.
- Baum, Wilhelm; Winkler, Dietmar W. (2003). The Church of the East: A Concise History. London-New York: Routledge-Curzon. ISBN 978-1-134-43019-2.
- Baumer, Christoph (2006). The Church of the East: An Illustrated History of Assyrian Christianity. London-New York: Tauris. ISBN 978-1-84511-115-1.
- Chabot, Jean-Baptiste (1896). "Éttat religieux des diocèses formant le patriarcat chaldéen de Babylone". Revue de l'Orient chrétien. 1: 433–453.
- Fiey, Jean Maurice (1977). Nisibe, métropole syriaque orientale et ses suffragants des origines à nos jours. Louvain: Secrétariat du CorpusSCO. ISBN 978-2-8017-0061-7.
- Fiey, Jean Maurice (1993). Pour un Oriens Christianus Novus: Répertoire des diocèses syriaques orientaux et occidentaux. Beirut: Orient-Institut. ISBN 978-3-515-05718-9.
- Giamil, Samuel (1902). Genuinae relationes inter Sedem Apostolicam et Assyriorum orientalium seu Chaldaeorum ecclesiam. Roma: Ermanno Loescher.
- Martin, P., La Chaldée, esquisse historique, suivie de quelques réflexions sur l'Orient (Rome, 1867)
- Tfinkdji, Joseph (1914). "L' église chaldéenne catholique autrefois et aujourd'hui". Annuaire Pontifical Catholique. 17: 449–525.
- Tisserant, Eugène (1931). "L'Église nestorienne". Dictionnaire de théologie catholique. Vol. 11. Paris: Letouzey et Ané. pp. 157–323.
- Wilmshurst, David (2000). The Ecclesiastical Organisation of the Church of the East, 1318–1913. Louvain: Peeters Publishers. ISBN 978-90-429-0876-5.
- Wilmshurst, David (2011). The Martyred Church: A History of the Church of the East. London: East & West Publishing Limited. ISBN 978-1-907318-04-7.
