= Söğütönü, Pervari =

Village in Siirt Province, Turkey

Söğütönü
- Village
- Location within Turkey
- Coordinates: 37.910°N 42.757°E
- Country: Turkey
- Province: Siirt
- District: Pervari
- Population (2021): 490
- Time zone: UTC+3 (TRT)

Söğütönü (Kurdish: Nureşîn) is a village in the Pervari District of Siirt Province in Turkey. The village is populated by Kurds and had a population of 490 in 2021.

It was depopulated in the 1990s.
