= Akdoğmuş, Siirt =

Village in Siirt Province, Turkey

Akdoğmuş
- Village
- Location within Turkey
- Coordinates: 37.853°N 42.045°E
- Country: Turkey
- Province: Siirt
- District: Siirt
- Population (2021): 184
- Time zone: UTC+3 (TRT)

Akdoğmuş (Kurdish: Gundêşêx) is a village in the Siirt District of Siirt Province in Turkey. The village is populated by Kurds of the Botikan tribe and had a population of 184 in 2021.
