= Palamutlu, Pervari =

Village in Siirt Province, Turkey

Palamutlu
- Village
- Location within Turkey
- Coordinates: 37.899°N 42.201°E
- Country: Turkey
- Province: Siirt
- District: Pervari
- Population (2021): 1,443
- Time zone: UTC+3 (TRT)

Palamutlu (Kurdish: Şoz) is a village in the Pervari District of Siirt Province in Turkey. The village is populated by Kurds of the Botikan tribe and had a population of 1,443 in 2021.

The hamlet of Yazıcık is attached to the village.
