= Demirkaya, Siirt =

Village in Siirt Province, Turkey

Demirkaya
- Village
- Location within Turkey
- Coordinates: 37.822°N 41.895°E
- Country: Turkey
- Province: Siirt
- District: Siirt
- Population (2021): 103
- Time zone: UTC+3 (TRT)

Demirkaya (Kurdish: Hadid, Syriac: Hadīde) is a village in the Siirt District of Siirt Province in Turkey. The village is populated by Kurds of the Botikan tribe and had a population of 103 in 2021.

The hamlet of Akarsu is attached to the village.

== History ==
The village was part of the Chaldean Catholic Eparchy of Seert of the Chaldean Catholic Church and had a population of 200 Assyrians in 1913.
