= Belenoluk, Pervari =

Village in Siirt Province, Turkey

Belenoluk
- Village
- Location within Turkey
- Coordinates: 37.915°N 42.778°E
- Country: Turkey
- Province: Siirt
- District: Pervari
- Population (2021): 765
- Time zone: UTC+3 (TRT)

Belenoluk (Kurdish: Hêşet) is a village in the Pervari District of Siirt Province in Turkey. The village is populated by Kurds of the Adiyan and Şakiran tribes and had a population of 765 in 2021.
