= Yarımca, Baykan =

Village in Siirt Province, Turkey

Yarımca
- Village
- Location within Turkey
- Coordinates: 38.189°N 41.871°E
- Country: Turkey
- Province: Siirt
- District: Baykan
- Population (2021): 498
- Time zone: UTC+3 (TRT)

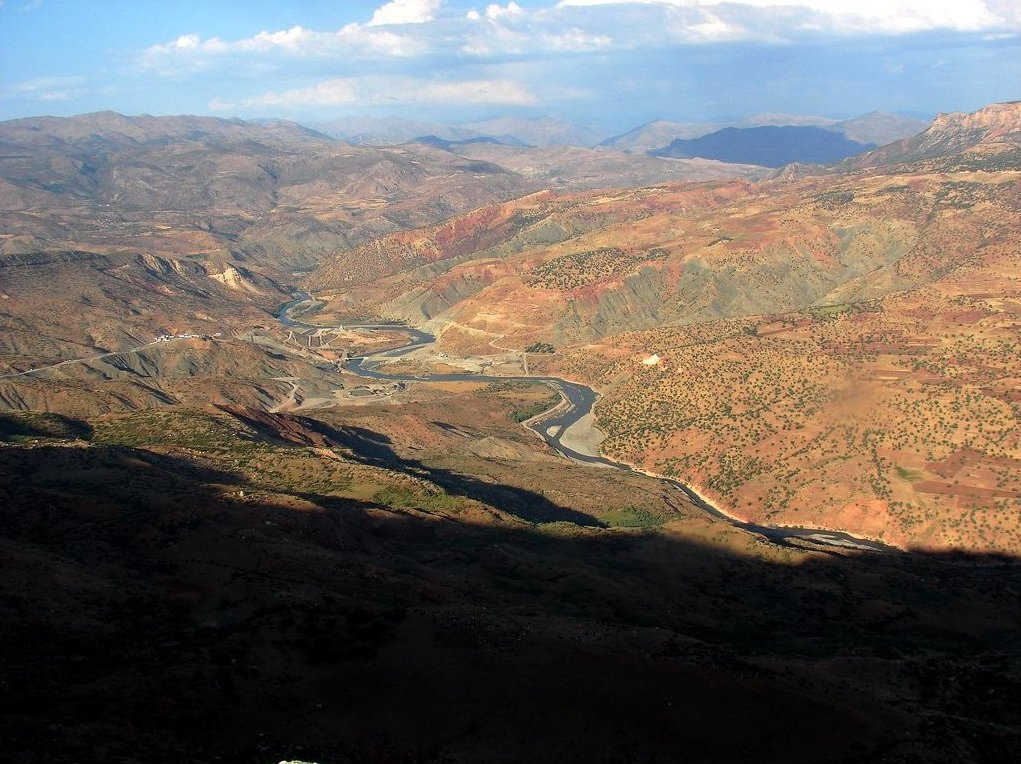
Valley of the Botan, near Aydınlar (Tillo) district of Siirt Province, Turkey

Yarımca (Kurdish: Erbo) is a village in the Baykan District of Siirt Province in Turkey. The village had a population of 498 in 2021.

The hamlet of Sarıyurt is attached to the village.
