= Ormanpınar, Baykan =

Village in Siirt Province, Turkey

Ormanpınar
- Village
- Location within Turkey
- Coordinates: 38.185°N 41.742°E
- Country: Turkey
- Province: Siirt
- District: Baykan
- Population (2021): 386
- Time zone: UTC+3 (TRT)

Ormanpınar (Kurdish: Bilvanis) is a village in the Baykan District of Siirt Province in Turkey. The village is populated by Kurds and had a population of 386 in 2021.

It was burned by authorities in 1995, during the Kurdish–Turkish conflict.
