= Ekmekçiler, Siirt =

Village in Siirt Province, Turkey

Ekmekçiler
- Village
- Location within Turkey
- Coordinates: 37.884°N 42.127°E
- Country: Turkey
- Province: Siirt
- District: Siirt
- Population (2021): 897
- Time zone: UTC+3 (TRT)

Ekmekçiler (Kurdish: Binerver) is a village in the Siirt District of Siirt Province in Turkey. The village is populated by Kurds of the Botikan tribe and had a population of 897 in 2021.

The hamlet of Elmacık is attached to the village.
