= Derince, Baykan =

Village in Siirt Province, Turkey

Derince
- Village
- Location within Turkey
- Coordinates: 38.205°N 41.801°E
- Country: Turkey
- Province: Siirt
- District: Baykan
- Population (2021): 164
- Time zone: UTC+3 (TRT)

Derince (Kurdish: Şikarim) is a village in the Baykan District of Siirt Province in Turkey. The village is populated by Kurds of the Etmanekî tribe and had a population of 164 in 2021.
