= Günbuldu, Baykan =

Village in Siirt Province, Turkey

Günbuldu
- Village
- Location within Turkey
- Coordinates: 38.205°N 41.787°E
- Country: Turkey
- Province: Siirt
- District: Baykan
- Population (2021): 298
- Time zone: UTC+3 (TRT)

Günbuldu (Kurdish: Melo) is a village in the Baykan District of Siirt Province in Turkey. The village is populated by Kurds of the Etmanekî tribe and had a population of 298 in 2021.
