= Ormandalı, Pervari =

Village in Siirt Province, Turkey

Ormandalı
- Village
- Location within Turkey
- Coordinates: 37.942°N 42.487°E
- Country: Turkey
- Province: Siirt
- District: Pervari
- Population (2021): 881
- Time zone: UTC+3 (TRT)

Ormandalı (Kurdish: Hêşeta jêr) is a village in the Pervari District of Siirt Province in Turkey. The village is populated by Kurds of the Adiyan and Şakiran tribes. It had a population of 881 in 2021.
