= Koçlu, Siirt =

Village in Siirt Province, Turkey

Koçlu
- Village
- Location within Turkey
- Coordinates: 37.866°N 42.022°E
- Country: Turkey
- Province: Siirt
- District: Siirt
- Population (2021): 139
- Time zone: UTC+3 (TRT)

Koçlu (Kurdish: Sadax) is a village in the Siirt District of Siirt Province in Turkey. The village is populated by Kurds of the Botikan tribe and had a population of 139 in 2021.
