= Çaykaya, Baykan =

Village in Siirt Province, Turkey

Çaykaya
- Village
- Location within Turkey
- Coordinates: 38.077°N 41.763°E
- Country: Turkey
- Province: Siirt
- District: Baykan
- Population (2021): 215
- Time zone: UTC+3 (TRT)

Çaykaya (Kurdish: Malabado) is a village in the Baykan District of Siirt Province in Turkey. The village is populated by Kurds of the Babosî tribe and had a population of 215 in 2021.

The hamlets of Bardaklı, Geçit and Karataş are attached to Çaykaya.
