= Kasımlı, Baykan =

Village in Siirt Province, Turkey

Kasımlı
- Village
- Location within Turkey
- Coordinates: 38.149°N 41.908°E
- Country: Turkey
- Province: Siirt
- District: Baykan
- Population (2021): 343
- Time zone: UTC+3 (TRT)

Kasımlı (Kurdish: Werkanis) is a village in the Baykan District of Siirt Province in Turkey. The village had a population of 343 in 2021.

The hamlets of Bölücek and Yuvacık are attached to the village.

== Notable people ==
- Şeyh Fethullah Verkanisi
