= Doğanköy, Pervari =

Village in Siirt Province, Turkey

Doğanköy
- Village
- Location within Turkey
- Coordinates: 37.762°N 42.789°E
- Country: Turkey
- Province: Siirt
- District: Pervari
- Population (2021): 2,356
- Time zone: UTC+3 (TRT)

Doğanköy (Kurdish: Ûsiyan) is a village in the Pervari District of Siirt Province in Turkey. The village is populated by Kurds of the Goyan tribe and had a population of 2,356 in 2021.

The three hamlets of Ilısu, İnceler and Karamik are attached to Doğanköy.
