= Köprüçay, Pervari =

Village in Siirt Province, Turkey

Köprüçay
- Village
- Location within Turkey
- Coordinates: 37.878°N 42.303°E
- Country: Turkey
- Province: Siirt
- District: Pervari
- Population (2021): 536
- Time zone: UTC+3 (TRT)

Köprüçay (Kurdish: Kêverok) is a village in the Pervari District of Siirt Province in Turkey. The village is populated by Kurds and had a population of 536 in 2021.

The village was depopulated in the 1990s.
