= Pervari District =

District of Siirt Province, Turkey

Pervari
- District
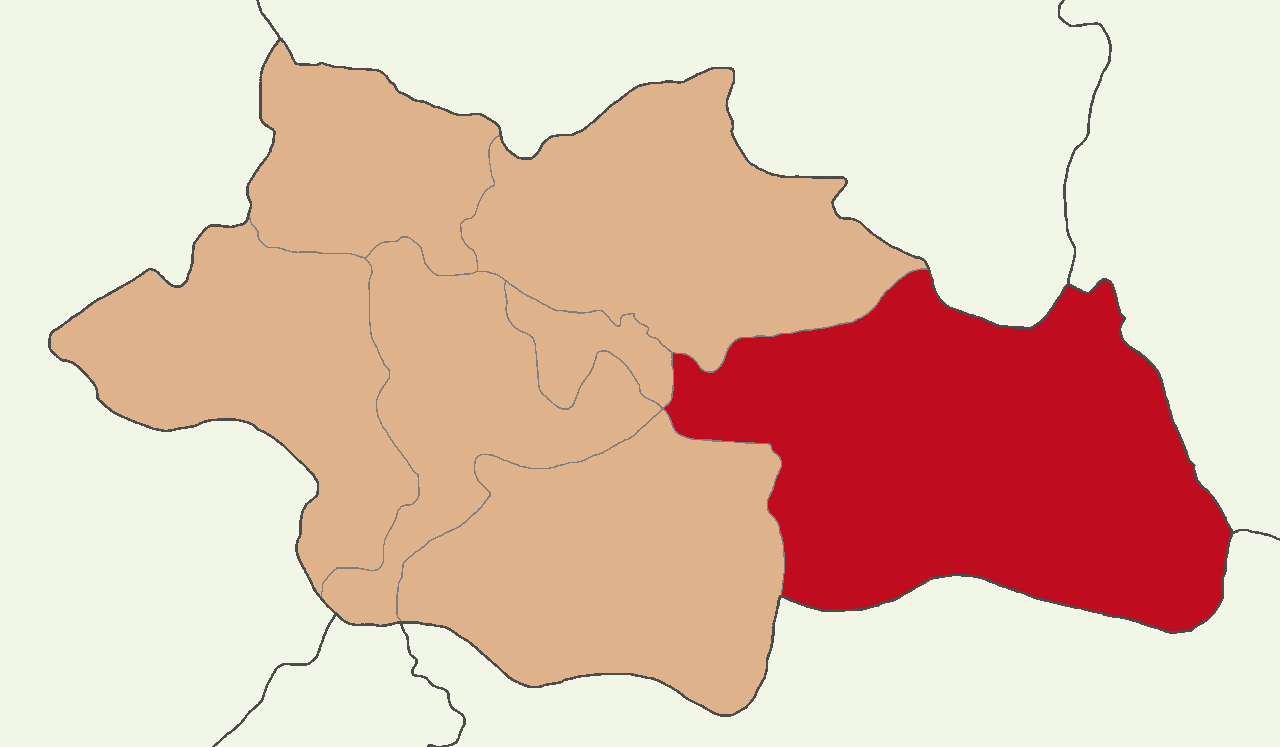
- Map showing Pervari District in Siirt Province
- Country: Turkey
- Province: Siirt
- Seat: Pervari
- Area: 1,651 km^{2} (637 sq mi)
- Population (2021): 30,276
  - Density: 18.34/km^{2} (47.50/sq mi)
- Time zone: UTC+3 (TRT)

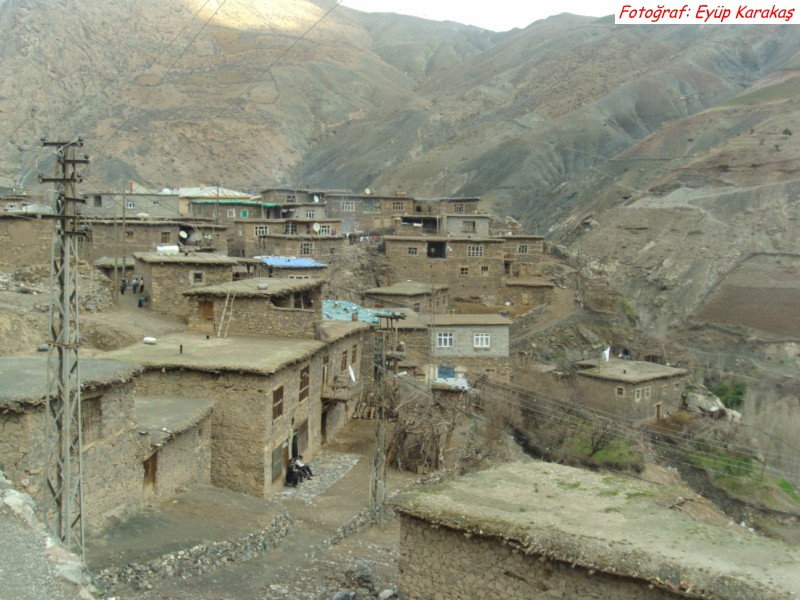
Beğendik, Pervari

Pervari District is a district of Siirt Province in Turkey which has the town of Pervari as its seat. The district had a population of 30,276 in 2021. Its area is 1,651 km^{2}.

The district is fully Kurdish.

== Settlements ==
The district encompasses the seat of Pervari, belde of Beğendik (Bedar), forty-one villages and twenty-one hamlets.

=== Villages ===
- Aşağıbalcılar
- Ayvalıbağ (Tenûra jorîn)
- Belenoluk (Hêşita jorîn)
- Bentköy (Serxanis)
- Çatköy
- Çavuşlu (Çors)
- Çobanören (Wîlas)
- Çukurköy (Çuqûr)
- Doğanca (Xerxûr)
- Doğanköy (Ûsiyan)
- Dolusalkım (Meytîs)
- Düğüncüler (Kimyanis)
- Ekindüzü (Hertevin)
- Erkent (Êrkend)
- Gökbudak (Sanoh)
- Gökçekoru (Kesrafan)
- Gölgeli (Deştetan)
- Gözlükuyu
- Güleçler (Hinuk)
- Gümüşören (Ûzîm)
- Karasungur (Beruk)
- Karşıkaya (Herat)
- Keskin (Borim)
- Kışlacık (Koriç)
- Kocaçavuş (Kizok)
- Kovanağzı (Tal)
- Köprüçay
- Medrese
- Narsuyu (Kîp)
- Ormandalı (Hestan)
- Palamutlu (Şuş)
- Sarıdam (Ataf)
- Sarıyaprak (Aqêr)
- Söğütönü (Noreşin)
- Taşdibek (Pîroz)
- Tosuntarla (Gundeş)
- Tuzcular (Serhel)
- Üçoyuk (Sulati)
- Yapraktepe (Ewrex)
- Yeniaydın (Rûbar)
- Yukarıbalcılar
