= Çağbaşı, Siirt =

Village in Siirt Province, Turkey

Çağbaşı
- Village
- Location within Turkey
- Coordinates: 37.831°N 42.086°E
- Country: Turkey
- Province: Siirt
- District: Siirt
- Population (2021): 51
- Time zone: UTC+3 (TRT)

Çağbaşı (Kurdish: Tirim) is a village in the Siirt District of Siirt Province in Turkey. The village is populated by Kurds of the Botikan tribe and had a population of 51 in 2021.
