= Zorkaya, Siirt =

Village in Siirt Province, Turkey

Zorkaya
- Village
- Location within Turkey
- Coordinates: 37.839°N 41.872°E
- Country: Turkey
- Province: Siirt
- District: Siirt
- Population (2021): 65
- Time zone: UTC+3 (TRT)

Zorkaya is a village in the Siirt District of Siirt Province in Turkey. The village had a population of 65 in 2021.
