= Çatköy, Pervari =

Village in Siirt Province, Turkey

Çatköy
- Village
- Location within Turkey
- Coordinates: 37.947°N 42.354°E
- Country: Turkey
- Province: Siirt
- District: Pervari
- Population (2021): 281
- Time zone: UTC+3 (TRT)

Çatköy (Kurdish: Çatê) is a village in the Pervari District of Siirt Province in Turkey. The village is populated by Kurds and had a population of 281 in 2021.

The village was depopulated in the 1990s.
