= Kalender, Siirt =

Village in Siirt Province, Turkey

Kalender
- Village
- Location within Turkey
- Coordinates: 37.842°N 41.973°E
- Country: Turkey
- Province: Siirt
- District: Siirt
- Population (2021): 27
- Time zone: UTC+3 (TRT)

Kalender is a village in the Siirt District of Siirt Province in Turkey. The village is populated by Kurds of the Botikan tribe and had a population of 27 in 2021.

The hamlet of Demirtaş is attached to the village.
