= Adakale, Baykan =

Village in Siirt Province, Turkey

Adakale
- Village
- Location within Turkey
- Coordinates: 38.131°N 41.870°E
- Country: Turkey
- Province: Siirt
- District: Baykan
- Population (2021): 429
- Time zone: UTC+3 (TRT)

Adakale (Kurdish: Derzin) is a village in the Baykan District of Siirt Province in Turkey. The village had a population of 429 in 2021.

The hamlet of Topraklı is attached to Adakale.
