= Karşıkaya, Pervari =

Village in Siirt Province, Turkey

Karşıkaya
- Village
- Location within Turkey
- Coordinates: 37.953°N 42.689°E
- Country: Turkey
- Province: Siirt
- District: Pervari
- Population (2021): 401
- Time zone: UTC+3 (TRT)

Karşıkaya (Kurdish: Herat) is a village in the Pervari District of Siirt Province in Turkey. The village had a population of 401 in 2021.
