= Yeniaydın, Pervari =

Village in Siirt Province, Turkey

Yeniaydın
- Village
- Location within Turkey
- Coordinates: 37.881°N 42.432°E
- Country: Turkey
- Province: Siirt
- District: Pervari
- Population (2021): 670
- Time zone: UTC+3 (TRT)

Yeniaydın (Kurdish: Rûbar) is a village in the Pervari District of Siirt Province in Turkey. The village is populated by Kurds of the Adiyan tribe and had a population of 670 in 2021.

The hamlet of İğneli is attached to the village.
