= Narlıyurt, Baykan =

Village in Siirt Province, Turkey

Narlıyurt
- Village
- Location within Turkey
- Coordinates: 38.083°N 41.883°E
- Country: Turkey
- Province: Siirt
- District: Baykan
- Population (2021): 213
- Time zone: UTC+3 (TRT)

Narlıyurt (Kurdish: Dezlak) is a village in the Baykan District of Siirt Province in Turkey. The village is populated by Kurds of the Hevêdan tribe and had a population of 213 in 2021.

The hamlets of Ayranlı, Sıralı, Uğurlu (Sadî) and Uzunkavak are attached to Narlıyurt.
