= Bayraktepe, Siirt =

Village in Siirt Province, Turkey

Bayraktepe
- Village
- Location within Turkey
- Coordinates: 37.864°N 42.069°E
- Country: Turkey
- Province: Siirt
- District: Siirt
- Population (2021): 119
- Time zone: UTC+3 (TRT)

Bayraktepe (Kurdish: Çul) is a village in the Siirt District of Siirt Province in Turkey. The village is populated by Kurds of the Botikan tribe and had a population of 119 in 2021.
