= Sarısalkım, Baykan =

Village in Siirt Province, Turkey

Sarısalkım
- Village
- Location within Turkey
- Coordinates: 38.114°N 41.626°E
- Country: Turkey
- Province: Siirt
- District: Baykan
- Population (2021): 432
- Time zone: UTC+3 (TRT)

Sarısalkım (Kurdish: Narê) is a village in the Baykan District of Siirt Province in Turkey. The village is populated by Kurds of the Babosî tribe and had a population of 432 in 2021.
