= Sarıtepe, Siirt =

Village in Siirt Province, Turkey

Sarıtepe
- Village
- Location within Turkey
- Coordinates: 38.033°N 41.803°E
- Country: Turkey
- Province: Siirt
- District: Siirt
- Population (2021): 249
- Time zone: UTC+3 (TRT)

Sarıtepe (Kurdish: Madar) is a village in the Siirt District of Siirt Province in Turkey. The village had a population of 249 in 2021.

The hamlets of Karakuyu, Kayacık and Toraklı (Şarno) are attached to the village.
