= Dolusalkım, Pervari =

Village in Siirt Province, Turkey

Dolusalkım
- Village
- Location within Turkey
- Coordinates: 37.991°N 42.469°E
- Country: Turkey
- Province: Siirt
- District: Pervari
- Population (2021): 523
- Time zone: UTC+3 (TRT)

Dolusalkım (Kurdish: Meytîs) is a village in the Pervari District of Siirt Province in Turkey. The village is populated by Kurds of the Adiyan tribe and had a population of 523 in 2021.
