= Baykan District =

District of Siirt Province, Turkey

Baykan
- District
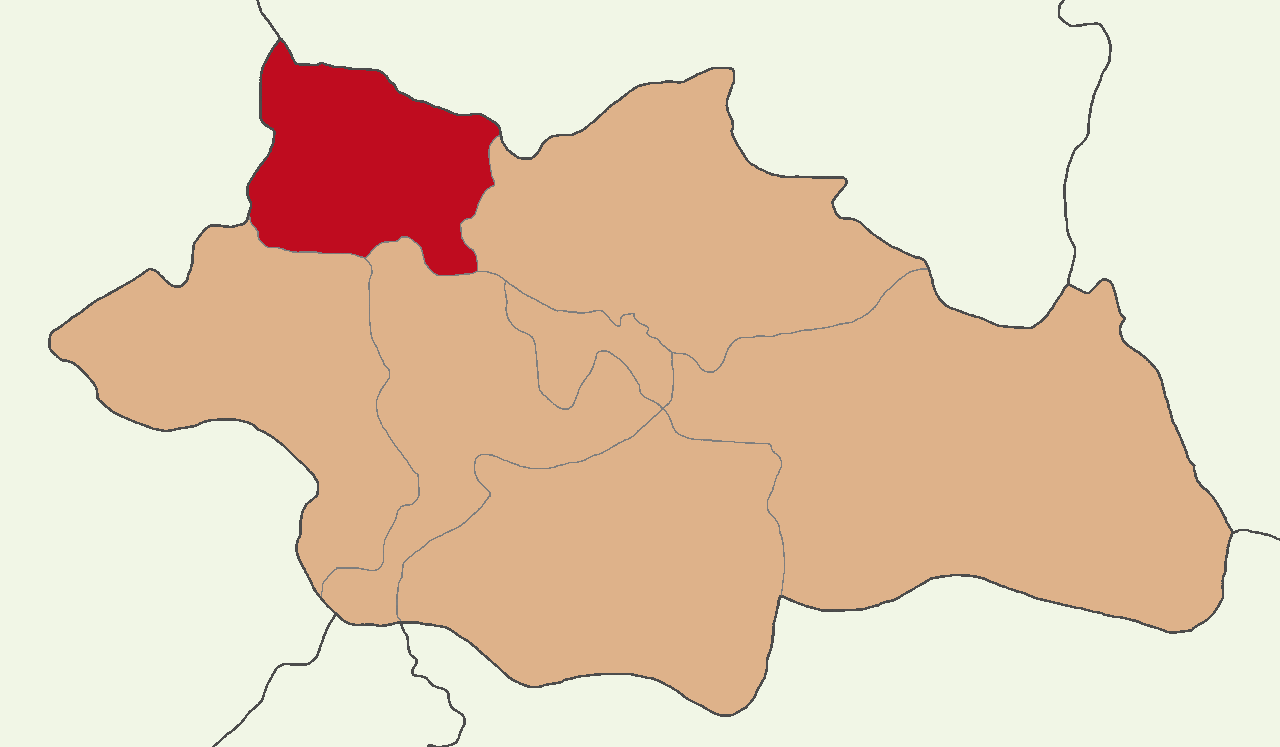
- Map showing Baykan District in Siirt Province
- Country: Turkey
- Province: Siirt
- Seat: Baykan
- Area: 488 km^{2} (188 sq mi)
- Population (2021): 21,321
  - Density: 44/km^{2} (110/sq mi)
- Time zone: UTC+3 (TRT)

Baykan District is a district of Siirt Province in Turkey. The town of Baykan is the seat and the district had a population of 21,321 in 2021. Its area is 488 km^{2}.

The district was established in 1938.

== Settlements ==
The district encompasses the seat of Baykan, two beldes, thirty villages and thirty-six hamlets.

=== Municipalities ===
1. Atabağı (Comanî)
2. Baykan (Hawêl)
3. Veyselkarani (Ziyaret)

=== Villages ===
1. Adakale (Derzin)
2. Ardıçdalı (Xelikan)
3. Çamtaşı (Arinc)
4. Çaykaya (Malabado)
5. Çelikli (Baqinê)
6. Çevrimtepe (Girdikan)
7. Çukurca (Derzin)
8. Dedebakırı (Çirê)
9. Demirışık (Taronî)
10. Derince (Şikarim)
11. Dilektepe (Minar)
12. Dokuzçavuş (Dêreban)
13. Engin (Ingêz)
14. Gümüşkaş (Siyanis)
15. Günbuldu (Milo)
16. Gündoğdu (Gundo)
17. İkizler (Kîkan)
18. Karakaya (Kelhok)
19. Kasımlı (Werqanis)
20. Meşelik (Madaran)
21. Narlıyurt (Dêzlak)
22. Obalı (Nêrban)
23. Ormanpınar (Bilwanis)
24. Sarıdana (Mezrê)
25. Sarısalkım (Narê)
26. Tütenocak (Kox)
27. Ulaştı (Dodan)
28. Ünlüce (Tutî)
29. Yarımca (Erbo)
30. Yeşilçevre (Bayîkan)
