= Doluharman, Siirt =

Village in Siirt Province, Turkey

Doluharman
- Village
- Location within Turkey
- Coordinates: 37.986°N 41.916°E
- Country: Turkey
- Province: Siirt
- District: Siirt
- Population (2021): 898
- Time zone: UTC+3 (TRT)

Doluharman or Fiskin is a village in the Siirt District of Siirt Province in Turkey. The village is populated by Arabs and had a population of 898 in 2021.
