= Keskin, Pervari =

Village in Siirt Province, Turkey

Keskin
- Village
- Location within Turkey
- Coordinates: 37.945°N 42.708°E
- Country: Turkey
- Province: Siirt
- District: Pervari
- Population (2021): 301
- Time zone: UTC+3 (TRT)

Keskin (Kurdish: Borim, Syriac: Borm) is a village in the Pervari District of Siirt Province in Turkey. The village had a population of 301 in 2021.

== History ==
The village was part of the Chaldean Catholic Eparchy of Seert of the Chaldean Catholic Church and had a population of 282 Assyrians in 1913.
