= Akyamaç, Siirt =

Village in Siirt Province, Turkey

Akyamaç
- Village
- Location within Turkey
- Coordinates: 37.992°N 41.936°E
- Country: Turkey
- Province: Siirt
- District: Siirt
- Population (2022): 156
- Time zone: UTC+3 (TRT)

Akyamaç or Elenzok is a village in the Siirt District of Siirt Province in Turkey. The village is populated by Arabs and had a population of 156 in 2022.

== Population ==
Historic population figures of the village:

Historical population
Year	Pop.	±%
1965	414	—
1970	503	+21.5%
1980	215	−57.3%
1990	146	−32.1%
2000	172	+17.8%
2010	169	−1.7%
2020	170	+0.6%
2022	156	−8.2%
