= Kirazlık Dam =

- Location within Turkey
- Official name: Kirazlık Regulator and Hydroelectric Power Plant
- Country: Turkey
- Coordinates: 37°55′22″N 042°03′39″E
- Purpose: Regulation, power
- Status: Operational
- Construction began: 2009
- Opening date: 2011

Dam and spillways
- Impounds: Botan River
- Height: 60 m (197 ft)
- Spillway type: Gate-controlled

Power Station
- Commission date: 2013
- Type: Run-of-the-river
- Turbines: 3 x 15 MW Kaplan-type
- Installed capacity: 45 MW
- Annual generation: 165 million kWh

The Kirazlık Dam is a gravity dam on the Botan River, 9 km (6 mi) east of Siirt in Siirt Province of southeastern Turkey. The purpose of the dam is to regulate the outflow of the Alkumru Dam upstream and to produce hydroelectric power with a run-of-the-river design. The dam was completed in late 2011 and the power station become operational in 2013. The power plant houses three 15 MW Kaplan turbine-generators.
