= Yokuşbağları, Siirt =

Village in Siirt Province, Turkey

Yokuşbağları
- Village
- Location within Turkey
- Coordinates: 37.772°N 41.845°E
- Country: Turkey
- Province: Siirt
- District: Siirt
- Population (2021): 302
- Time zone: UTC+3 (TRT)

Yokuşbağları (Kurdish: Suske) is a village in the Siirt District of Siirt Province in Turkey. The village is populated by Kurds and had a population of 302 in 2021. The hamlets of Balıklı, Çiçekyurdu, Özkonak and Yığınlı are attached to the village.

Yokuşbağları was burned by authorities in 1995, during the Kurdish–Turkish conflict.
