= Tuzcular, Pervari =

Village in Siirt Province, Turkey

Tuzcular
- Village
- Location within Turkey
- Coordinates: 37.896°N 42.408°E
- Country: Turkey
- Province: Siirt
- District: Pervari
- Population (2021): 651
- Time zone: UTC+3 (TRT)

Tuzcular (Kurdish: Serhêl) is a village in the Pervari District of Siirt Province in Turkey. The village is populated by Kurds and had a population of 651 in 2021.

The village was depopulated in the 1990s.
