= Shattak =

River in Kurdistan

The Shokh or Shattak river in Kurdistan appears to be the most distant of the sources of the eastern Tigris, arising from the foot of the lofty chain of Billi, from the snow-clad crest of which Mr. Layard clearly distinguished the peak of Ararat, 145 miles distant. The country traversed on this occasion between Lake Van and the Great Zab is indeed throughout new to geographers, and was hitherto a blank on their maps. It joins the Mox river "about three miles north-west of Khoskheyr", where "the united streams then take the name of the Bohtan Su" and eventually flow into the Tigris at Til (Çattepe).
