= Bingöl, Eruh =

Village in Siirt Province, Turkey

Bingöl
- Village
- Location within Turkey
- Coordinates: 37.709°N 42.068°E
- Country: Turkey
- Province: Siirt
- District: Eruh
- Population (2021): 12
- Time zone: UTC+3 (TRT)

Bingöl (Kurdish: Benguf; Syriac: Bingov) (Note: Also known as Benkof.) is a village in the Eruh District of Siirt Province in Turkey. The village is populated by Kurds of the Jilyan tribe and had a population of 12 in 2021.

== History ==
Bingov (today known as Bingöl) was historically inhabited by Chaldean Catholics. In 1913, it was populated by 110 Chaldean Catholics, who were served by one priest and one church as part of the Chaldean Catholic Eparchy of Seert. They were annihilated by Kurdish tribes in 1915 amidst the Sayfo.

== Bibliography ==
- Gaunt, David (2006). Massacres, Resistance, Protectors: Muslim-Christian Relations in Eastern Anatolia during World War I. Gorgias Press.
- Wilmshurst, David (2000). The Ecclesiastical Organisation of the Church of the East, 1318–1913 (PDF). Peeters Publishers.
