= Sağlarca, Siirt =

Village in Siirt Province, Turkey

Sağlarca
- Village
- Location within Turkey
- Coordinates: 37.836°N 41.872°E
- Country: Turkey
- Province: Siirt
- District: Siirt
- Population (2022): 30
- Time zone: UTC+3 (TRT)

Sağlarca (Kurdish: Bilorus) is a village in the Siirt District of Siirt Province in Turkey. The village is populated by Kurds of the Botikan tribe and had a population of 30 in 2022.

== History ==
The village was abandoned in the 1990s due to harassment by the Turkish military. It had a population of around 500 before the depopulation.

== Population ==
Population history from 1965 to 2022:

Population
Year	Pop.	±%
1965	197	—
1985	428	+117.3%
1990	0	−100.0%
2000	0	0.00%
2007	72	—
2008	95	+31.9%
2009	81	−14.7%
2010	83	+2.5%
2011	85	+2.4%
2012	74	−12.9%
2013	54	−27.0%
2014	78	+44.4%
2015	68	−12.8%
2016	57	−16.2%
2017	62	+8.8%
2018	112	+80.6%
2019	121	+8.0%
2020	65	−46.3%
2021	29	−55.4%
2022	30	+3.4%
