= Doğanca, Pervari =

Village in Siirt Province, Turkey

Doğanca
- Village
- Location within Turkey
- Coordinates: 37.806°N 42.340°E
- Country: Turkey
- Province: Siirt
- District: Pervari
- Population (2021): 152
- Time zone: UTC+3 (TRT)

Doğanca (Kurdish: Xerxur) is a village in the Pervari District of Siirt Province in Turkey. The village is populated by Kurds of the Botikan tribe and had a population of 152 in 2021.

== Notable people ==
- Şeyh Abdurrahman Garisi
