= Alkumru Dam =

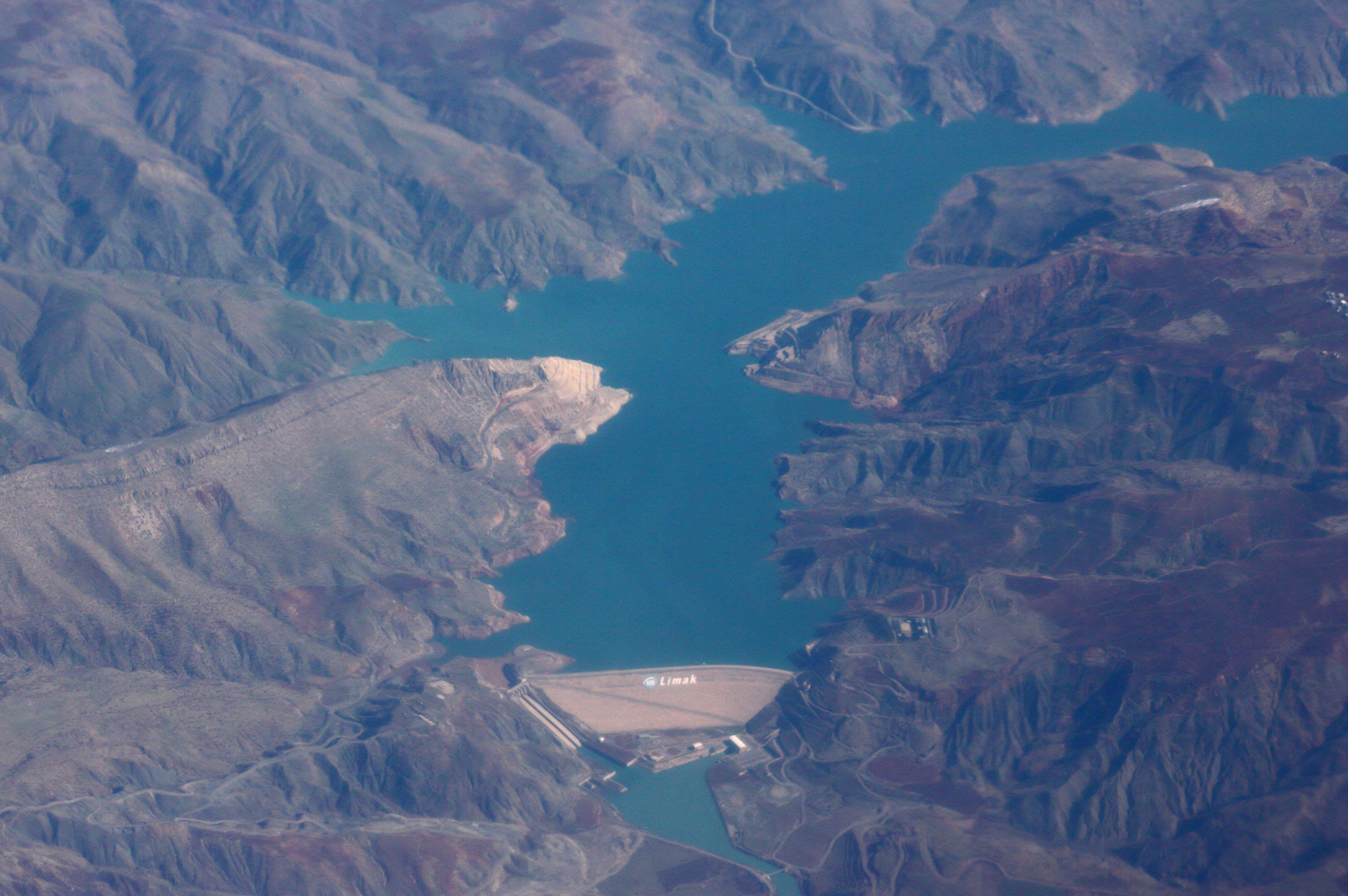

- Location within Turkey
- Country: Turkey
- Location: Siirt
- Coordinates: 37°57′33″N 42°05′34″E
- Status: Operational
- Construction began: 2008
- Opening date: 2011
- Construction cost: US$ 465 million
- Owner: Turkish State Hydraulic Works

Dam and spillways
- Type of dam: Embankment, rock-fill
- Impounds: Botan River
- Height (foundation): 134 m (440 ft)
- Height (thalweg): 100 m (328 ft)
- Length: 1,058 m (3,471 ft)
- Dam volume: 13,000,000 m^{3} (17,003,358 cu yd)

Power Station
- Commission date: 2011
- Turbines: 3 x 88.5 MW Francis-type
- Installed capacity: 265.5 MW

The Alkumru Dam is a rock-fill embankment dam on the Botan River, located 14 km (9 mi) east of Siirt in Siirt Province, Turkey. The dam was constructed between 2008 and 2011. It was inaugurated by President Abdullah Gül and Prime Minister Recep Tayyip Erdoğan on 19 May 2011. Its primary purpose is hydroelectric power generation and it supports a 265.5 MW power station. The first two generators were commissioned in March 2011 with the third and final in April 2011.

== See also ==
- Kirazlık Dam – regulator downstream
- Çetin Dam – upstream, under construction
