= Gümüşören, Pervari =

Gümüşören
- Village
- Interactive map of Gümüşören
- Coordinates: 37°59′56″N 42°42′32″E
- Country: Turkey
- District: Pervari
- Population (2021): 542
- Time zone: UTC+3 (TRT)

Gümüşören (Armenian: Ոզիմ or Ոզմ; Kurdish: Ûzîm) is a village in the Pervari District in the Siirt Province of Turkey. The village is populated by Kurds of the Şakiran tribe and had a population of 542 in 2021.

The hamlet of Ulupınar is attached to the village.

The village was depopulated in the 1990s.
