= Çavuşlu, Pervari =

Village in Siirt Province, Turkey

Çavuşlu
- Village
- Location within Turkey
- Coordinates: 38.006°N 42.427°E
- Country: Turkey
- Province: Siirt
- District: Pervari
- Population (2021): 552
- Time zone: UTC+3 (TRT)

Çavuşlu (Kurdish: Çors) is a village in the Pervari District of Siirt Province in Turkey. The village is populated by Kurds of the Adiyan tribe and had a population of 552 in 2021.
