= Kayaboğaz, Siirt =

Village in Siirt Province, Turkey

Kayaboğaz
- Village
- Location within Turkey
- Coordinates: 37.891°N 41.984°E
- Country: Turkey
- Province: Siirt
- District: Siirt
- Population (2021): 62
- Time zone: UTC+3 (TRT)

Kayaboğaz (Kurdish: Xêrtê) is a village in the Siirt District of Siirt Province in Turkey. The village is populated by Kurds of the Botikan tribe and had a population of 62 in 2021.

The hamlet of Tapınak is attached to the village.
