= Dilektepe, Baykan =

Village in Siirt Province, Turkey

Dilektepe
- Village
- Location within Turkey
- Coordinates: 38.081°N 41.831°E
- Country: Turkey
- Province: Siirt
- District: Baykan
- Population (2021): 235
- Time zone: UTC+3 (TRT)

Dilektepe (Kurdish: Minar; Syriac: Man'ar) (Note: Also spelt as Menar or Mnar.) is a village in the Baykan District of Siirt Province in Turkey. The village had a population of 235 in 2021.

== History ==
Man'ar (today called Dilektepe) was historically inhabited by Syriac Orthodox Christians or Armenians. In the Syriac Orthodox patriarchal register of dues of 1870, it was recorded that the village had 21 households, who paid 83 dues, and it had one priest. There was a church of Morī Zayā and a church of Morī Gewargīs and Morī Qawmī. It was located in the district of al-Zarqiyyah. In 1895, amidst the Hamidian massacres, the village was completely ruined and depopulated after it was plundered and its population was massacred and kidnapped, according to one source, whereas James Henry Monahan, the British Vice-Consul of Bitlis, recorded that he had heard that the village was unaffected. Monahan noted the village was populated by Syriac Orthodox Christians and Muslim Kurds in 1898.

== Bibliography ==
- Bcheiry, Iskandar (2009). The Syriac Orthodox Patriarchal Register of Dues of 1870: An Unpublished Historical Document from the Late Ottoman Period. Gorgias Press.
- Demir Görür, Emel (2020). "İngiliz Konsolos James Henry Monahan'ın Raporlarında Bitlis Vilayeti (1896-1898)". Akademik Bakış (in Turkish). 13 (26): 244–266. doi:10.19060/gav.750472. Archived from the original on 27 November 2020.
- Verheij, Jelle (2017). ""The year of the firman:" The 1895 massacres in Hizan and Şirvan (Bitlis vilayet)". Études arméniennes contemporaines. 10 (10): 125–159.
