= Çelikli, Baykan =

Village in Siirt Province, Turkey

Çelikli
- Village
- Location within Turkey
- Coordinates: 38.089°N 41.659°E
- Country: Turkey
- Province: Siirt
- District: Baykan
- Population (2021): 317
- Time zone: UTC+3 (TRT)

Çelikli (Kurdish: Bakine) is a village in the Baykan District of Siirt Province in Turkey. The village is populated by Kurds of the Babosî tribe and had a population of 317 in 2021.
