= Karakaya, Baykan =

Village in Siirt Province, Turkey

Karakaya
- Village
- Location within Turkey
- Coordinates: 38.081°N 41.726°E
- Country: Turkey
- Province: Siirt
- District: Baykan
- Population (2021): 776
- Time zone: UTC+3 (TRT)

Karakaya (Kurdish: Kelhok) is a village in the Baykan District of Siirt Province in Turkey. The village is populated by Kurds of the Babosî tribe and had a population of 776 in 2021.

The hamlet of Eğridal is attached to Karakaya.
