= Obalı, Baykan =

Village in Siirt Province, Turkey

Obalı
- Village
- Location within Turkey
- Coordinates: 38.156°N 41.811°E
- Country: Turkey
- Province: Siirt
- District: Baykan
- Population (2021): 378
- Time zone: UTC+3 (TRT)

Obalı (Kurdish: Nêrban) is a village in the Baykan District of Siirt Province in Turkey. The village is populated by Kurds of the Etmanekî tribe and had a population of 378 in 2021.

The hamlets of Akbudak (Çemê Çawîş), Akdiken (Gayîna), Dumanlı (Tahtêreş), Köklü (Ginê), Ocaklı and Yelkesen are attached to Obalı.
