= Demirışık, Baykan =

Village in Siirt Province, Turkey

Demirışık
- Village
- Location within Turkey
- Coordinates: 38.192°N 41.835°E
- Country: Turkey
- Province: Siirt
- District: Baykan
- Population (2021): 319
- Time zone: UTC+3 (TRT)

Demirışık (Kurdish: Taronî) is a village in the Baykan District of Siirt Province in Turkey. The village had a population of 319 in 2021.
