= Ünlüce, Baykan =

Village in Siirt Province, Turkey

Ünlüce
- Village
- Location within Turkey
- Coordinates: 38.116°N 41.858°E
- Country: Turkey
- Province: Siirt
- District: Baykan
- Population (2021): 200
- Time zone: UTC+3 (TRT)

Ünlüce (Kurdish: Tûtî) is a village in the Baykan District of Siirt Province in Turkey. The village is populated by Kurds of the Etmanekî tribe and had a population of 200 in 2021.

The hamlet of Dumanlı is attached to Ünlüce.
