= Meşelik, Baykan =

Village in Siirt Province, Turkey

Meşelik
- Village
- Location within Turkey
- Coordinates: 38.212°N 41.693°E
- Country: Turkey
- Province: Siirt
- District: Baykan
- Population (2021): 290
- Time zone: UTC+3 (TRT)

Meşelik (Kurdish: Maderan) is a village in the Baykan District of Siirt Province in Turkey. The village is populated by Kurds of the Çirî tribe and had a population of 290 in 2021.

The hamlet of Umutlu is attached to Meşelik.
