= Yerlibahçe, Siirt =

Village in Siirt Province, Turkey

Yerlibahçe
- Village
- Location within Turkey
- Coordinates: 37.875°N 41.916°E
- Country: Turkey
- Province: Siirt
- District: Siirt
- Population (2021): 99
- Time zone: UTC+3 (TRT)

Yerlibahçe (Kurdish: Kutmis, Syriac: Kitmis, Qetmos) is a village in the Siirt District of Siirt Province in Turkey. The village had a population of 99 in 2021.

== History ==
The village was part of the Chaldean Catholic Eparchy of Seert of the Chaldean Catholic Church and had a population of 326 Assyrians in 1913.
