= Sarıyaprak, Pervari =

Village in Siirt Province, Turkey

Sarıyaprak
- Village
- Location within Turkey
- Coordinates: 37.721°N 42.835°E
- Country: Turkey
- Province: Siirt
- District: Pervari
- Population (2021): 274
- Time zone: UTC+3 (TRT)

Sarıyaprak (Kurdish: Aqêr) is a village in the Pervari District of Siirt Province in Turkey. The village is populated by Kurds of the Berwarî tribe and had a population of 274 in 2021.

The hamlets of Karadayı is attached to the village.
