= Hertevin =

Village in Siirt Province, Turkey

- Village
- Location within Turkey
- Coordinates: 37.924007°N 42.354676°E
- Country: Turkey
- Province: Siirt
- District: Pervari
- Population (2021): 315
- Time zone: UTC+3 (TRT)

Hertevin, officially Ekindüzü, (Armenian: Արդվան, Kurdish: Hertevîn) is a village in the Pervari District of Siirt Province in Turkey.

It was one of the last Assyrian villages in the country prior to Sayfo. The village is now populated by Kurds of the Şakiran tribe and had a population of 315 in 2021.

The hamlet of Yukarı Ekindüzü is attached to the village.

== Name ==
There is no single correct spelling for the name of the village. Spellings used by sources include Artuvin, Hartiv, Artevna, Hertevina, Hertvin, Hertivin, Hertivinler and Ertevın.

Other Armenian sources call it Artoun, Ertun or Arton.

In Armenian, the village is called Artvan.

== Location ==
The village is located on a mountainous plateau, in the Turkish region of Southeast Anatolia. It is 30 km west of Pervari, 60 km southwest of Lake Van, 70 km north of the Iranian border, and 68 km north of the Syrian border.

The village is split in two parts.

== History ==
=== Ancient history ===
The Assyrian king Sennacherib conquered the region in 697 BC, then in the hands of the Urartians.

=== Assyrian and Armenian era ===
There were four Chaldean Catholic churches in the village, including that of Mar Ishak (Saint Isaac) and Mar Giorgis (Saint George). The churches were part of the diocese of Siirt (in Classical Syriac: ܣܥܪܬ) until 1915. In the village of Rabanokan, there was an Armenian Church, known as Surp Asdvadzadzin (en Armenian: Սուրբ Աստուածածին Տաճար, in English Saint Mother of God), also called Surp Sargis (en Armenian: Սուրբ Սարգիս, in English Saint Serge).

During the Ottoman era, the villagers of Hartevin were Rayats of the principality of Bhotan under the authority of the local Kurdish agha, which was somewhat independent of the central government in Constantinople because of the isolation and mountainous nature of the region. The agha owed the residents protection in exchange for the half of the products of their labor. Administratively, the village was in the Sanjak of Siirt in the ancient province of Bitlis Vilayet.

Hartevin was surrounded by many Kurdish villages. Many of these villages had been of Assyrian or Armenian origins and were replaced by Kurdish populations after massacres, and in many cases, the names were changed. The population suffered under the Hamidian massacres committed against Christians in 1895.

In 1909, Rabanok was population by 20 Armenian families. In 1915, Hartevin had a population of 200, in addition to five Armenian families of 45 people in Rabanok, but the village was destroyed during the Armenian Genocide. The Chaldean Catholic bishop of the village was assassinated, and the Venezuelan soldier Rafael de Nogales Méndez witnessed the extermination of tens of thousands of Armenians around Siirt.

The fall of 1928 saw the final expulsion of the remaining Armenians to Syria.

With a population of 500 in the 1970s, the population of Hertevin and other Assyrian villages left Turkey from the 1970s into the 1990s, due to violence and discrimination in the region. In 1982, three Christian families remained in the village. Today, most of these people live in the Paris region, mostly in Seine-Saint-Denis, and mainly in Clichy-sous-Bois.), with smaller numbers in Germany and Sweden. No Assyrians remain in the village.

=== Kurdish era ===
At the end of 1994, the village was attacked and partially destroyed by the Turkish army (it was one of 6,000 villages destroyed in the 1990s), in its conflict against the PKK, which continues to result in violence in the region.

In 2011, a textilte factory opened in the village, employing 150 people.

In 2017, there was only a single family remaining who speaks the Hertevin dialect of Aramaic.

== Population and culture ==
=== Population history ===
Population

Year	Inhabitants
1915	200
1965	437
1975	515
1985	406
1990	546
2021	315

=== Language ===
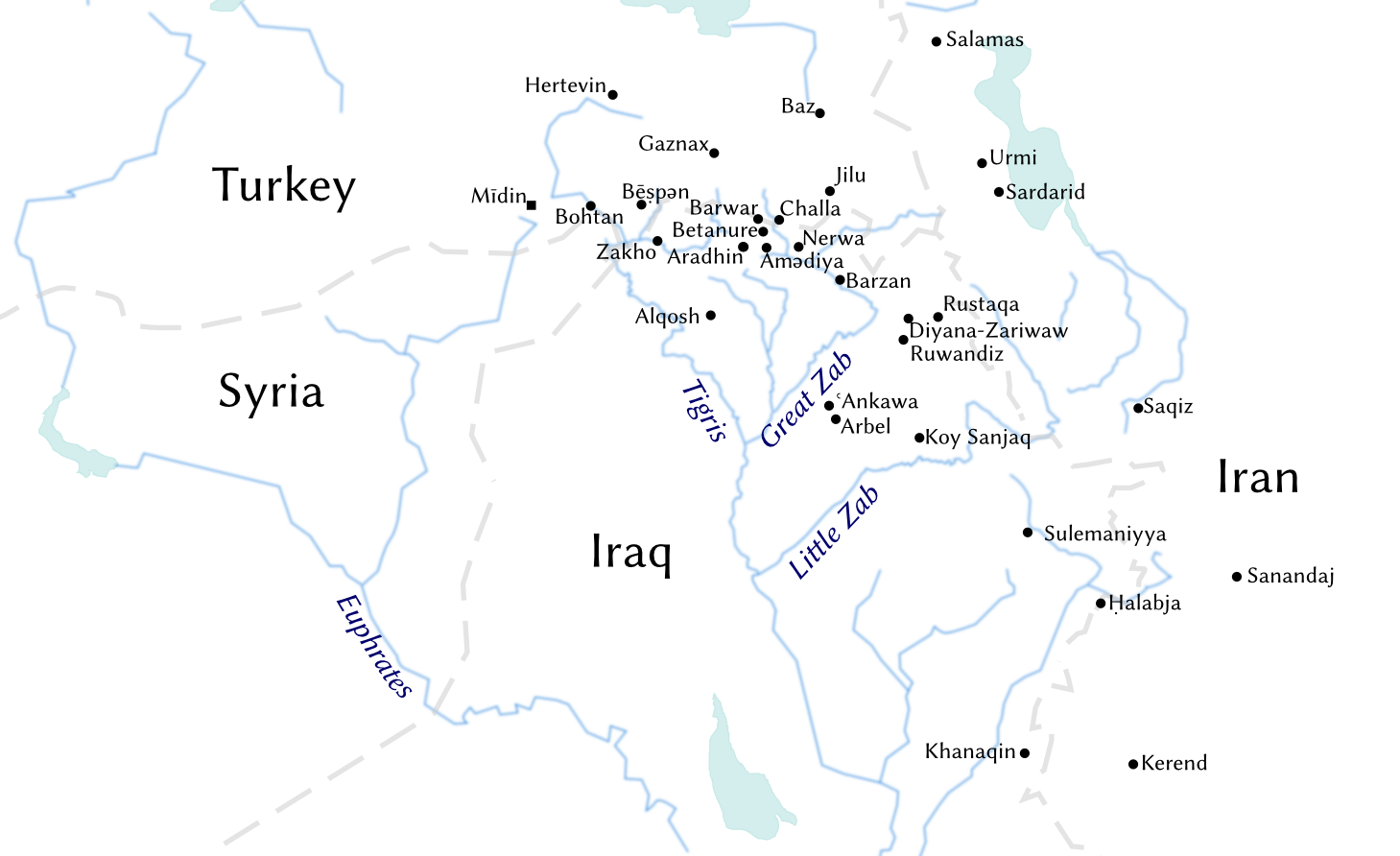
Residents of Hertevin speak soureth, one of the branches of Eastern Neo-Aramaic.

In addition to the Mouch dialect of Armenian that was spoken before the 1930s, and the Kurmanji dialect of Kurdish spoken by most residents today, Hertevin was known for its Soureth dialect that was different from other dialects in the region. which was also spoken until the departure of the Assyrians in nearby villages, known in Turkish as Hertevince (ISO 639-3 : hrt).

This dialect was the main languages of the village until the 1960s.

In the west, it was first discovered by German linguist Otto Jastrow in 1970, who studied it and described it in detail in 1972.
