= Güleçler, Pervari =

Village in Siirt Province, Turkey

Güleçler
- Village
- Location within Turkey
- Coordinates: 37.952°N 42.538°E
- Country: Turkey
- Province: Siirt
- District: Pervari
- Population (2021): 1,295
- Time zone: UTC+3 (TRT)

Güleçler (Kurdish: Xûnik) is a village in the Pervari District of Siirt Province in Turkey. The village is populated by Kurds of the Şakiran tribe and had a population of 1,295 in 2021.
