= Ormanardı, Siirt =

Village in Siirt Province, Turkey

Ormanardı
- Village
- Location within Turkey
- Coordinates: 37.721°N 41.839°E
- Country: Turkey
- Province: Siirt
- District: Siirt
- Population (2021): 120
- Time zone: UTC+3 (TRT)

Ormanardı (Kurdish: Girdara) is a village in the Siirt District of Siirt Province in Turkey. The village is populated by Kurds of the Jilyan tribe and had a population of 120 in 2021.
