= İkizler, Baykan =

Village in Siirt Province, Turkey

İkizler
- Village
- Location within Turkey
- Coordinates: 38.109°N 41.835°E
- Country: Turkey
- Province: Siirt
- District: Baykan
- Population (2021): 213
- Time zone: UTC+3 (TRT)

İkizler (Kurdish: Kikan) is a village in the Baykan District of Siirt Province in Turkey. The village is populated by Kurds of the Etmanekî tribe and had a population of 213 in 2021.
