= Tütenocak, Baykan =

Village in Siirt Province, Turkey

Tütenocak
- Village
- Location within Turkey
- Coordinates: 38.100°N 41.681°E
- Country: Turkey
- Province: Siirt
- District: Baykan
- Population (2021): 615
- Time zone: UTC+3 (TRT)

Tütenocak (Kurdish: Kox) is a village in the Baykan District of Siirt Province in Turkey. The village is populated by Kurds of the Çirî tribe and had a population of 615 in 2021.

The hamlets of Aşağıtütenocak and Yeşil are attached to Tütenocak.
