= Addai Sher =

Chaldean Catholic cleric and scholar (1867–1915)

Addai Scher
- Archbishop of the Eparchy of Siirt
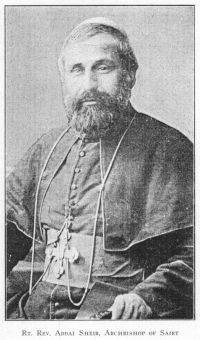
- See: Archeparchy of Siirt
- In office: 13 November 1902—21 June 1915
- Predecessor: Yousef VI Emmanuel II Thomas
- Successor: Ceased to exist
- Previous post: Priest

Orders
- Ordination: 15 August 1889

Personal details
- Born: 3 March 1867 Shaqlawa
- Died: 21 June 1915 (aged 48) Siirt

Addai Sher (Syriac: ܐܕܝ ܫܝܪ, IPA: [ʔadðˈðaːj ʃeːr]; Arabic: أدي شير), also written Addai Scher, Addaï Scher and Addai Sheir (3 March 1867 – 21 June 1915), was an ethnic Assyrian Chaldean Catholic archbishop of Siirt in Upper Mesopotamia. He was killed by the Ottomans during the 1915 Assyrian genocide.

== Early life ==
Addai was born in Shaqlāwa to an ethnic Assyrian family, who were adherents of the Chaldean Catholic Church, on 3 March 1867. His father was the local priest of the village, and he helped him become a teacher of the Syriac language at a young age. The early death of Addai's mother made him concentrate on ascetic life, and he joined the Dominican Seminary in Mosul, Ottoman Iraq, in 1880, where he studied Syriac, Arabic, French, Latin, and Turkish, as well as theology and philosophy. Nine years later, he was appointed a priest and sent back to his hometown of Shaqlāwa, where he once more worked as a teacher in the church's school.

== Priest and bishop ==
He was later appointed as a bishopric assistant in Kirkuk, Ottoman Iraq, where he spent his time studying Hebrew, Greek, Persian, and Kurdish, as well as writing in German and English.

On 13 November 1902, he was elected as the next bishop of Siirt, a position that had been vacant for two years. In 1908, he traveled to Constantinople where he met the Ottoman Sultan Abdul Hamid II. From there, he visited Rome and met Pope Pius X, while during a stay in Paris, he managed to make contacts with French orientalists and print some of his works.

== Death ==
In 1915, the Ottoman Army was initially defeated in the Caucasus during the World War I, and fearing an internal uprising from its Christian population orders were given to exterminate the Armenian, Greek, and Assyrian population of Anatolia. Initially Addai Sher managed to bribe the governor of Siirt with 500 pounds of gold in order to save his congregation. This enabled some of the Chaldean Catholics of the city to flee. The bishop himself was helped by a Kurdish Agha who hid him in his house.

Some Kurds, subjects of Osman, Agha of Tanze, chief of the tribes Hadide and Atamissa, were great friends of the Archbishop and protectors of the Christians and disguised him as a Kurd, getting him away by a secret door of his residence. For some days he remained with his friend the Kurdish Agha, but an Ottoman regiment learning of his flight, attempted to trace him. Knowing that the Kurd chief had concealed him they summoned him to surrender the Archbishop, set fire to his house, and threatened him with death. The Kurdish Agha fled with his family. The Kurds who remained, tired of the struggle, were obliged to indicate the hiding place of the prelate, whom the soldiers seized and killed with eight shots.

The Archbishop remained hidden for several days, but eventually a band of Kurdish mercenaries who worked with the Ottoman Turkish army discovered his hideout. After being captured, a witness described the last hours of Addai Scher's life:

One day when we were at Sairt I was present at a horrible scene, the chief figure in which was His Grace, Mar Addai, the Chaldean Catholic Archbishop of that town. He was in a pitiable state, pale and thin. The soldiers began by jeering at him, pulling his beard and striking him with their rifle butts, firing their revolvers into the air in front of him. They then took the Archbishop outside the town, and, having slain his protector, Osman Agha, killing him with a fatal blow on the head, the butchers cut off the head of the Archbishop in order to show it to the Governor.

— Joseph Naayem, Shall This Nation Die?

== See also ==
- Seert (Chaldean Diocese)
- Assyrian Genocide
- Assyrian struggle for independence
- Assyrian people
- Assyria
- Syriac language
- Chaldean Catholic Church
- Assyrian Church of the East
- Toma Audo
