= Gölgeli, Pervari =

Village in Siirt Province, Turkey

Gölgeli
- Village
- Location within Turkey
- Coordinates: 37.959°N 42.458°E
- Country: Turkey
- Province: Siirt
- District: Pervari
- Population (2021): 294
- Time zone: UTC+3 (TRT)

Gölgeli (Kurdish: Deştetan) is a village in the Pervari District of Siirt Province in Turkey. The village is populated by Kurds of the Adiyan tribe and had a population of 294 in 2021.
