= Çamtaşı, Baykan =

Village in Siirt Province, Turkey

Çamtaşı
- Village
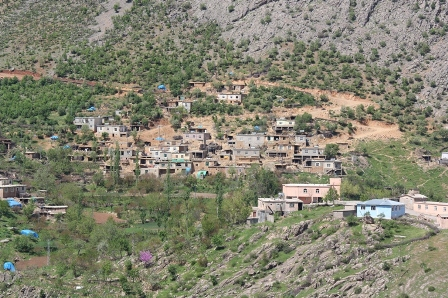

- Location within Turkey
- Coordinates: 38.216°N 41.767°E
- Country: Turkey
- Province: Siirt
- District: Baykan
- Population (2021): 495
- Time zone: UTC+3 (TRT)

Çamtaşı (Kurdish: Arinc) is a village in the Baykan District of Siirt Province in Turkey. The village had a population of 495 in 2021.
