= Yeşilçevre, Baykan =

Village in Siirt Province, Turkey

Yeşilçevre
- Village
- Location within Turkey
- Coordinates: 38.144°N 41.745°E
- Country: Turkey
- Province: Siirt
- District: Baykan
- Population (2022): 169
- Time zone: UTC+3 (TRT)

Yeşilçevre (Kurdish: Bayîkan) is a village in the Baykan District of Siirt Province in Turkey. The village is populated by Kurds of the Poran tribe and had a population of 169 in 2022.

The hamlet of Bahçeli, Çukurtaş, Doğruyol and Eri are attached to Yeşilçevre.

== Geography ==
The village is 40 km away from Siirt city center and 7 km away from Baykan district center.

== Population ==
Village population data by year
2022	169
2021	175
2020	177
2019	186
2018	186
2017	195
2016	204
2015	208
2014	201
2013	198
2012	209
2011	212
2010	209
2009	204
2008	208
2007	222
2000	279
1990	1,206
1985	3,038
