= Üçoyuk, Pervari =

Village in Siirt Province, Turkey

Üçoyuk
- Village
- Location within Turkey
- Coordinates: 37.968°N 42.358°E
- Country: Turkey
- Province: Siirt
- District: Pervari
- Population (2021): 140
- Time zone: UTC+3 (TRT)

Üçoyuk (Kurdish: Sûlatî) is a village in the Pervari District of Siirt Province in Turkey. The village had a population of 140 in 2021.
