= Kışlacık, Siirt =

Village in Siirt Province, Turkey

Kışlacık
- Village
- Location within Turkey
- Coordinates: 37.863°N 41.813°E
- Country: Turkey
- Province: Siirt
- District: Siirt
- Population (2021): 572
- Time zone: UTC+3 (TRT)

Kışlacık (Kurdish: Lif) is a village in the Siirt District of Siirt Province in Turkey. The village is populated by Kurds of the Mehmediyan tribe and had a population of 572 in 2021.
