= Bostancık, Siirt =

Village in Siirt Province, Turkey

Bostancık
- Village
- Location within Turkey
- Coordinates: 37.825°N 41.848°E
- Country: Turkey
- Province: Siirt
- District: Siirt
- Population (2021): 57
- Time zone: UTC+3 (TRT)

Bostancık (Kurdish: Dergalip) is a village in the Siirt District of Siirt Province in Turkey. The village is populated by Kurds of the Mehmediyan tribe and had a population of 57 in 2021.
