= Ulaştı, Baykan =

Village in Siirt Province, Turkey

Ulaştı
- Village
- Location within Turkey
- Coordinates: 38.118°N 41.792°E
- Country: Turkey
- Province: Siirt
- District: Baykan
- Population (2021): 540
- Time zone: UTC+3 (TRT)

Ulaştı (Kurdish: Dodan) is a village in the Baykan District of Siirt Province in Turkey. The village had a population of 540 in 2021.
