= Beşyol, Siirt =

Village in Siirt Province, Turkey

Beşyol
- Village
- Location within Turkey
- Coordinates: 38.016°N 41.865°E
- Country: Turkey
- Province: Siirt
- District: Siirt
- Population (2021): 91
- Time zone: UTC+3 (TRT)

Beşyol (Kurdish: Şamaşa) is a village in the Siirt District of Siirt Province in Turkey. The village had a population of 91 in 2021.

The hamlet of Kuşlu is attached to the village.
