= Gökçekoru, Pervari =

Village in Siirt Province, Turkey

Gökçekoru
- Village
- Location within Turkey
- Coordinates: 37.956°N 42.449°E
- Country: Turkey
- Province: Siirt
- District: Pervari
- Population (2021): 981
- Time zone: UTC+3 (TRT)

Gökçekoru (Kurdish: Kerefa) is a village in the Pervari District of Siirt Province in Turkey. The village is populated by Kurds of the Adiyan tribe and had a population of 981 in 2021.

The hamlet of Gökbel is attached to the village.
