= Gökbudak, Pervari =

Village in Siirt Province, Turkey

Gökbudak
- Village
- Location within Turkey
- Coordinates: 37.903°N 42.648°E
- Country: Turkey
- Province: Siirt
- District: Pervari
- Population (2021): 1,387
- Time zone: UTC+3 (TRT)

Gökbudak (Kurdish: Sanoh, Sanuh) is a village in the Pervari District of Siirt Province in Turkey. The village is populated by Kurds of the Adiyan tribe and had a population of 1,387 in 2021.
