= Sarıdam, Pervari =

Village in Siirt Province, Turkey

Sarıdam
- Village
- Location within Turkey
- Coordinates: 37.961°N 42.629°E
- Country: Turkey
- Province: Siirt
- District: Pervari
- Population (2021): 241
- Time zone: UTC+3 (TRT)

Sarıdam (Kurdish: Ataf) is a village in the Pervari District of Siirt Province in Turkey. The village is populated by Kurds of the Adiyan tribe and had a population of 241 in 2021.
