= Gündoğdu, Baykan =

Village in Siirt Province, Turkey

Gündoğdu
- Village
- Location within Turkey
- Coordinates: 38.098°N 41.790°E
- Country: Turkey
- Province: Siirt
- District: Baykan
- Population (2021): 506
- Time zone: UTC+3 (TRT)

Gündoğdu (Kurdish: Gundo) is a village in the Baykan District of Siirt Province in Turkey. The village is populated by Kurds of the Etmanekî tribe and had a population of 506 in 2021.
