= Yapraktepe, Pervari =

Village in Siirt Province, Turkey

Yapraktepe
- Village
- Location within Turkey
- Coordinates: 37.819°N 42.779°E
- Country: Turkey
- Province: Siirt
- District: Pervari
- Population (2021): 780
- Time zone: UTC+3 (TRT)

Yapraktepe (Kurdish: Ewrax) is a village in the Pervari District of Siirt Province in Turkey. The village is populated by Kurds and had a population of 754 in 2021.

The hamlets of Düğüncüler and Güzelbağ are attached to the village.

The village was depopulated in the 1990s.
