= Çukurca, Baykan =

Village in Siirt Province, Turkey

Çukurca
- Village
- Location within Turkey
- Coordinates: 38.225°N 41.650°E
- Country: Turkey
- Province: Siirt
- District: Baykan
- Population (2021): 273
- Time zone: UTC+3 (TRT)

Çukurca (Kurdish: Çirî) is a village in the Baykan District of Siirt Province in Turkey. The village is populated by Kurds of the Çirî tribe and had a population of 273 in 2021.

The hamlets of Aydınlar, Boyluca, Damlacık, Duraklı, Gürbulak and Oğlaklı are attached to Çukurca.
