= Çevrimtepe, Baykan =

Village in Siirt Province, Turkey

Çevrimtepe
- Village
- Location within Turkey
- Coordinates: 38.057°N 41.846°E
- Country: Turkey
- Province: Siirt
- District: Baykan
- Population (2021): 199
- Time zone: UTC+3 (TRT)

Çevrimtepe (Kurdish: Girdikan) is a village in the Baykan District of Siirt Province in Turkey. The village is populated by Kurds of the Silokan tribe and had a population of 199 in 2021.

The hamlets of Oymaklar, Toptepe and Ulukapı are attached to the village.
