= Aşağıbalcılar, Pervari =

Village in Siirt Province, Turkey

Aşağıbalcılar
- Village
- Location within Turkey
- Coordinates: 37.925°N 42.594°E
- Country: Turkey
- Province: Siirt
- District: Pervari
- Population (2021): 67
- Time zone: UTC+3 (TRT)

Aşağıbalcılar (Kurdish: Saruxa jêr) is a village in the Pervari District of Siirt Province in Turkey. The village is populated by Kurds of the Şakiran tribe. It had a population of 67 in 2021.
