= Yukarıbalcılar, Pervari =

Village in Siirt Province, Turkey

Yukarıbalcılar
- Village
- Location within Turkey
- Coordinates: 37.917°N 42.599°E
- Country: Turkey
- Province: Siirt
- District: Pervari
- Population (2021): 434
- Time zone: UTC+3 (TRT)

Yukarıbalcılar (Kurdish: Saruxa jor) is a village in the Pervari District of Siirt Province in Turkey. The village is populated by Kurds of the Şakiran tribe and had a population of 434 in 2021.
