= Bentköy, Pervari =

Village in Siirt Province, Turkey

Bentköy
- Village
- Location within Turkey
- Coordinates: 37.938°N 42.746°E
- Country: Turkey
- Province: Siirt
- District: Pervari
- Population (2021): 298
- Time zone: UTC+3 (TRT)

Bentköy (Kurdish: Serxanis) is a village in the Pervari District of Siirt Province in Turkey. The village is populated by Kurds of the Adiyan tribe and had a population of 298 in 2021.
