= Gümüşkaş, Baykan =

Village in Siirt Province, Turkey

Gümüşkaş
- Village
- Location within Turkey
- Coordinates: 38.152°N 41.675°E
- Country: Turkey
- Province: Siirt
- District: Baykan
- Population (2021): 307
- Time zone: UTC+3 (TRT)

Gümüşkaş (Kurdish: Siyanis) is a village in the Baykan District of Siirt Province in Turkey. The village is populated by Kurds of the Çirî tribe and had a population of 307 in 2021.
