= Eğlence, Siirt =

Village in Siirt Province, Turkey

Eğlence
- Village
- Location within Turkey
- Coordinates: 37.806°N 41.846°E
- Country: Turkey
- Province: Siirt
- District: Siirt
- Population (2021): 116
- Time zone: UTC+3 (TRT)

Eğlence (Kurdish: Çemê Pirê) is a village in the Siirt District of Siirt Province in Turkey. The village is populated by Kurds of the Botikan tribe and had a population of 116 in 2021.
