= Yağmurtepe, Siirt =

Village in Siirt Province, Turkey

Yağmurtepe
- Village
- Location within Turkey
- Coordinates: 37.947°N 41.877°E
- Country: Turkey
- Province: Siirt
- District: Siirt
- Population (2021): 277
- Time zone: UTC+3 (TRT)

Yağmurtepe (Armenian: Khoshenan; Kurdish: Xuşena) is a village in the Siirt District of Siirt Province in Turkey. The village had a population of 277 in 2021. It was populated by Armenians until the Armenian genocide.

The hamlets of Demirli, Kutluca, Oğulcuk and Yüklüce are attached to the village.
