= Düğüncüler, Pervari =

Village in Siirt Province, Turkey

Düğüncüler
- Village
- Location within Turkey
- Coordinates: 37.857°N 42.741°E
- Country: Turkey
- Province: Siirt
- District: Pervari
- Population (2021): 1,135
- Time zone: UTC+3 (TRT)

Düğüncüler (Kurdish: Kimyanis) is a village in the Pervari District of Siirt Province in Turkey. The village is populated by Kurds of the Ertoşî tribe and had a population of 1,135 in 2021.

The hamlet of Ormancık is attached to the village.
