= Konacık, Siirt =

Village in Siirt Province, Turkey

Konacık
- Village
- Location within Turkey
- Coordinates: 37.833°N 41.840°E
- Country: Turkey
- Province: Siirt
- District: Siirt
- Population (2021): 80
- Time zone: UTC+3 (TRT)

Konacık (Kurdish: Qesrik) is a village in the Siirt District of Siirt Province in Turkey. The village had a population of 80 in 2021.

The hamlets of Çiçekli and Demirkapı are attached to the village.
