= Ayvalıbağ, Pervari =

Village in Siirt Province, Turkey

Ayvalıbağ
- Village
- Location within Turkey
- Coordinates: 37.956°N 42.479°E
- Country: Turkey
- Province: Siirt
- District: Pervari
- Population (2021): 479
- Time zone: UTC+3 (TRT)

Ayvalıbağ (Kurdish: Tenûr) is a village in the Pervari District of Siirt Province in Turkey. The village is populated by Kurds of the Adiyan and Şakiran tribes and had a population of 479 in 2021.

The hamlet of Yukarı Ayvalıbağ is attached to the village.
