= Ardıçdalı, Baykan =

Village in Siirt Province, Turkey

Ardıçdalı
- Village
- Location within Turkey
- Coordinates: 38.206°N 41.710°E
- Country: Turkey
- Province: Siirt
- District: Baykan
- Population (2021): 107
- Time zone: UTC+3 (TRT)

Ardıçdalı (Kurdish: Xêlkan) is a village in the Baykan District of Siirt Province in Turkey. The village is populated by Kurds of the Çirî tribe and had a population of 107 in 2021.

The hamlet of Koruca is attached to Ardıçalı.
