= Dedebakırı, Baykan =

Village in Siirt Province, Turkey

Dedebakırı
- Village
- Location within Turkey
- Coordinates: 38.122°N 41.660°E
- Country: Turkey
- Province: Siirt
- District: Baykan
- Population (2021): 276
- Time zone: UTC+3 (TRT)

Dedebakırı (Kurdish: Mizî) is a village in the Baykan District of Siirt Province in Turkey. The village is populated by Kurds of the Babosî and Çirî tribes and had a population of 276 in 2021.
