= Sarıdana, Baykan =

Village in Siirt Province, Turkey

Sarıdana
- Village
- Location within Turkey
- Coordinates: 38.090°N 41.904°E
- Country: Turkey
- Province: Siirt
- District: Baykan
- Population (2021): 130
- Time zone: UTC+3 (TRT)

Sarıdana (Kurdish: Mezrê) is a village in the Baykan District of Siirt Province in Turkey. The village is populated by Kurds of the Hevêdan tribe and had a population of 130 in 2021.
