= Kavaközü, Siirt =

Village in Siirt Province, Turkey

Kavaközü
- Village
- Location within Turkey
- Coordinates: 37.739°N 41.845°E
- Country: Turkey
- Province: Siirt
- District: Siirt
- Population (2021): 194
- Time zone: UTC+3 (TRT)

Kavaközü (Kurdish: Tanze) is a village in the Siirt District of Siirt Province in Turkey. The village is populated by Kurds of the Botikan tribe and had a population of 194 in 2021.
