= Yazlıca, Siirt =

Village in Siirt Province, Turkey

Yazlıca
- Village
- Location within Turkey
- Coordinates: 37.721°N 41.804°E
- Country: Turkey
- Province: Siirt
- District: Siirt
- Population (2021): 28
- Time zone: UTC+3 (TRT)

Yazlıca (Kurdish: Seyfiyê) is a village in the Siirt District of Siirt Province in Turkey. The village is populated by Kurds of the Erebiyan tribe and had a population of 28 in 2021.

The hamlets of Boztaş and Harmanlı are attached to the village.
