= Tosuntarla, Pervari =

Village in Siirt Province, Turkey

Tosuntarla
- Village
- Location within Turkey
- Coordinates: 37.885°N 42.242°E
- Country: Turkey
- Province: Siirt
- District: Pervari
- Population (2021): 154
- Time zone: UTC+3 (TRT)

Tosuntarla (Kurdish: Gundêş) is a village in the Pervari District of Siirt Province in Turkey. The village is populated by Kurds of the Botikan tribe and had a population of 154 in 2021.
