= Kışlacık, Pervari =

Village in Siirt Province, Turkey

Kışlacık
- Village
- Location within Turkey
- Coordinates: 37.830°N 42.762°E
- Country: Turkey
- Province: Siirt
- District: Pervari
- Population (2021): 180
- Time zone: UTC+3 (TRT)

Kışlacık (Kurdish: Koriç) is a village in the Pervari District of Siirt Province in Turkey. The village is populated by Kurds and had a population of 180 in 2021.
