= Siirt District =

District of Siirt Province, Turkey

Siirt
- District
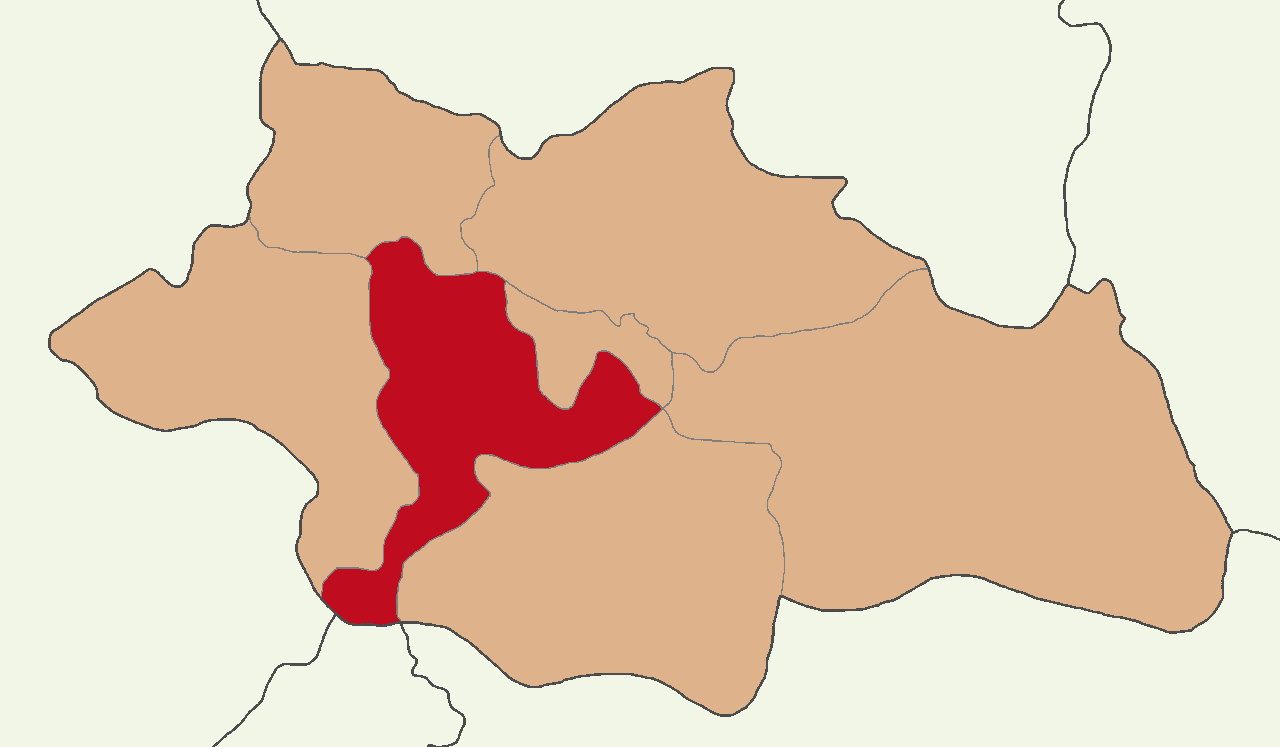
- Map showing Siirt District in Siirt Province
- Country: Turkey
- Province: Siirt
- Seat: Eruh
- Area: 633 km^{2} (244 sq mi)
- Population (2021): 172,824
  - Density: 270/km^{2} (710/sq mi)
- Time zone: UTC+3 (TRT)

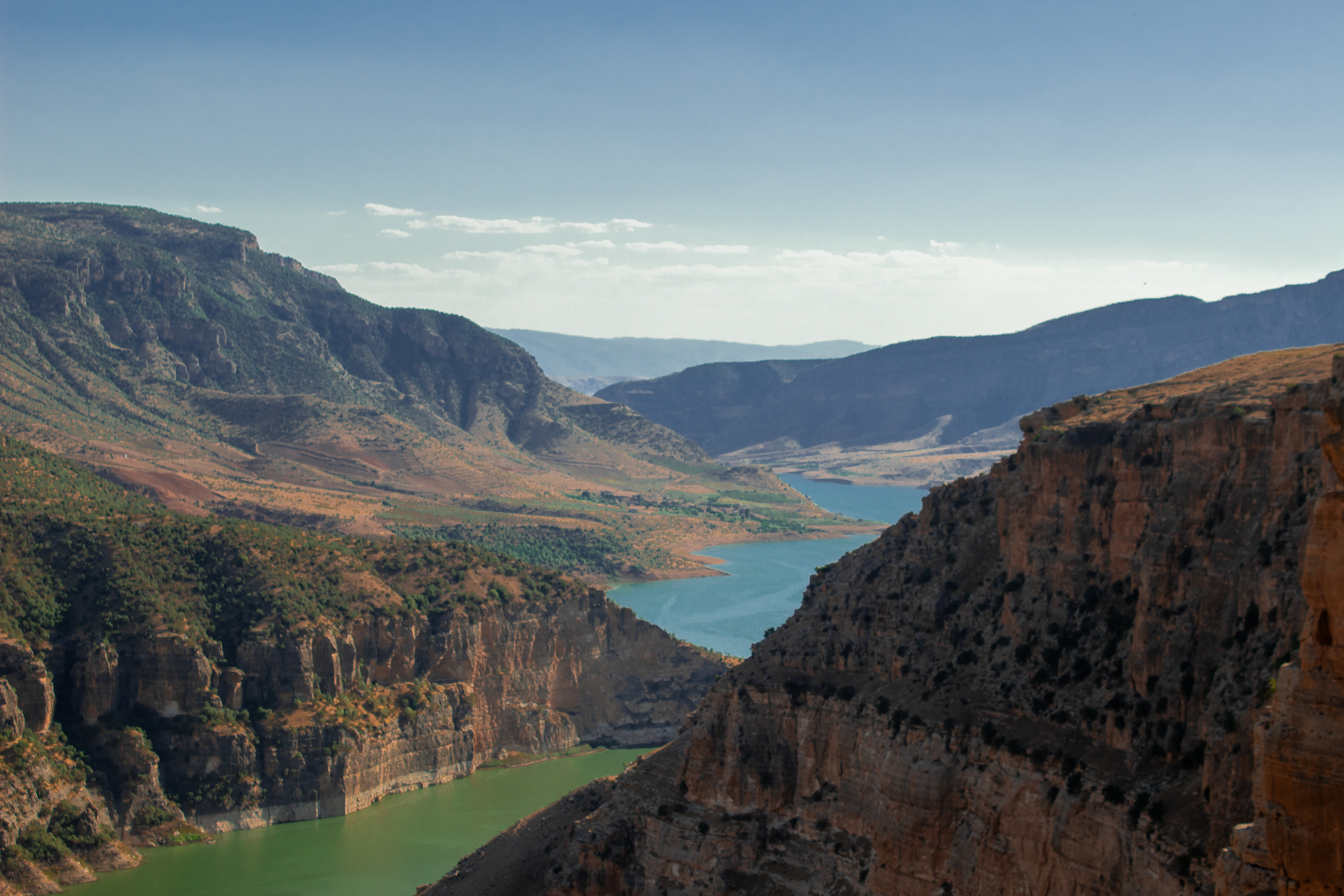
Botan Valley, Siirt

Siirt District (also: Merkez, meaning "central" in Turkish) is a district of Siirt Province in Turkey. The municipality of Siirt is its seat. The district had a population of 172,824 in 2021. Its area is 633 km^{2}.

== Geology and geomorphology ==
There is a national park called Botan valley national park in Siirt province.

== Settlements ==
The district encompasses the municipality of Siirt, the belde of Gökçebağ (Ciwanika), thirty-five villages and thirty-seven hamlets.

=== Villages ===
1. Akdoğmuş (Gundişeyx)
2. Aktaş (Berhurek)
3. Akyamaç
4. Bağlıca (Giravşe)
5. Bayraktepe (Çul)
6. Beşyol (Şamaşa)
7. Bostancık (Dergalip)
8. Çağbaşı (Tirim)
9. Demirkaya (Hadid)
10. Doluharman
11. Eğlence (Çemê Pirê)
12. Ekmekçiler (Binerver)
13. İnkapı (Degele)
14. Kalender
15. Kavaközü (Tanze)
16. Kayaboğaz (Xêrtê)
17. Kemerli (Kevîk)
18. Kışlacık (Lif)
19. Koçlu (Gundişeyx)
20. Konacık (Gundişeyx)
21. Köprübaşı (Malikoz)
22. Meşelidere (Gawat)
23. Meydandere (Nepile)
24. Ormanardı (Girdara)
25. Pınarca (Kezer)
26. Pınarova (Eyn Melek)
27. Sağırsu (Hilela)
28. Sağlarca (Bilorus)
29. Sarıtepe (Şarno)
30. Tuzkuyusu (Erbîne)
31. Yağmurtepe (Xuşena)
32. Yazlıca (Seyfiyê)
33. Yerlibahçe (Kutmis)
34. Yokuşbağları (Suske)
35. Zorkaya
