= Erkent, Pervari =

Village in Siirt Province, Turkey

Erkent
- Village
- Location within Turkey
- Coordinates: 37.769°N 42.356°E
- Country: Turkey
- Province: Siirt
- District: Pervari
- Population (2022): 222
- Time zone: UTC+3 (TRT)

Erkent (Kurdish: Êrkend) is a village in the Pervari District of Siirt Province in Turkey. The village had a population of 222 in 2022. It is populated by Kurds.

== History ==
The village had 120 families in 1989 which fell to 70 families in 1990 due to pressure from the Turkish state to work as village guards. The leaving families went for Adana. In September 1990, most of the male population was taken into custody and all except seven were later released. The village was evacuated and burned in 1993. It was later rebuilt.

== Population ==
Population history from 1965 to 2022:

Population
Year	Pop.	±%
1965	680	—
1985	1,034	+52.1%
1990	774	−25.1%
2000	0	−100.0%
2007	98	—
2008	86	−12.2%
2009	98	+14.0%
2010	110	+12.2%
2011	115	+4.5%
2012	125	+8.7%
2013	160	+28.0%
2014	176	+10.0%
2015	188	+6.8%
2016	229	+21.8%
2017	221	−3.5%
2018	224	+1.4%
2019	214	−4.5%
2020	211	−1.4%
2021	217	+2.8%
2022	222	+2.3%
