= Bağlıca, Siirt =

Village in Siirt Province, Turkey

Bağlıca
- Village
- Location within Turkey
- Coordinates: 37.798°N 41.889°E
- Country: Turkey
- Province: Siirt
- District: Siirt
- Population (2021): 277
- Time zone: UTC+3 (TRT)

Bağlıca (Kurdish: Gera Usê) is a village in the Siirt District of Siirt Province in Turkey. The village is populated by Kurds of the Botikan tribe and had a population of 277 in 2021.

It was burned by authorities in the early 1990s, during the Kurdish–Turkish conflict.
