= İnkapı, Siirt =

Village in Siirt Province, Turkey

İnkapı
- Village
- Location within Turkey
- Coordinates: 37.995°N 41.890°E
- Country: Turkey
- Province: Siirt
- District: Siirt
- Population (2021): 480
- Time zone: UTC+3 (TRT)

İnkapı (Armenian: Tekela; Kurdish: Degele) is a village in the Siirt District of Siirt Province in Turkey. The village had a population of 480 in 2021.

In 1878 and 1902 Armenian prelacy surveys, the village was not listed with an Armenian population, while in 1903, it included 4 Armenians and 4 Muslim households.

The hamlets of Aydoğan, Kuytuca and Yolbuldu are attached to the village.
