= Dokuzçavuş, Baykan =

Village in Siirt Province, Turkey

Dokuzçavuş
- Village
- Location within Turkey
- Coordinates: 38.077°N 41.845°E
- Country: Turkey
- Province: Siirt
- District: Baykan
- Population (2021): 48
- Time zone: UTC+3 (TRT)

Dokuzçavuş (Kurdish: Dereban) is a village in the Baykan District of Siirt Province in Turkey. The village had a population of 48 in 2021.
