= Kemerli, Siirt =

Village in Siirt Province, Turkey

Kemerli
- Village
- Location within Turkey
- Coordinates: 37.738°N 41.835°E
- Country: Turkey
- Province: Siirt
- District: Siirt
- Population (2021): 288
- Time zone: UTC+3 (TRT)

Kemerli (Kurdish: Kevîk) is a village in the Siirt District of Siirt Province in Turkey. The village is populated by Kurds of the Botikan tribe and had a population of 288 in 2021.

The hamlet of Erdoğdu is attached to the village.
