= Tuzkuyusu, Siirt =

Village in Siirt Province, Turkey

Tuzkuyusu
- Village
- Location within Turkey
- Coordinates: 38.005°N 41.831°E
- Country: Turkey
- Province: Siirt
- District: Siirt
- Population (2021): 548
- Time zone: UTC+3 (TRT)

Tuzkuyusu (Kurdish: Erbîne) is a village in the Siirt District of Siirt Province in Turkey. The village had a population of 548 in 2021.

The hamlets of Çevre, Ekinli and Yurt are attached to the village.
