= Beğendik, Pervari =

Village in Siirt Province, Turkey

Beğendik
- Municipality
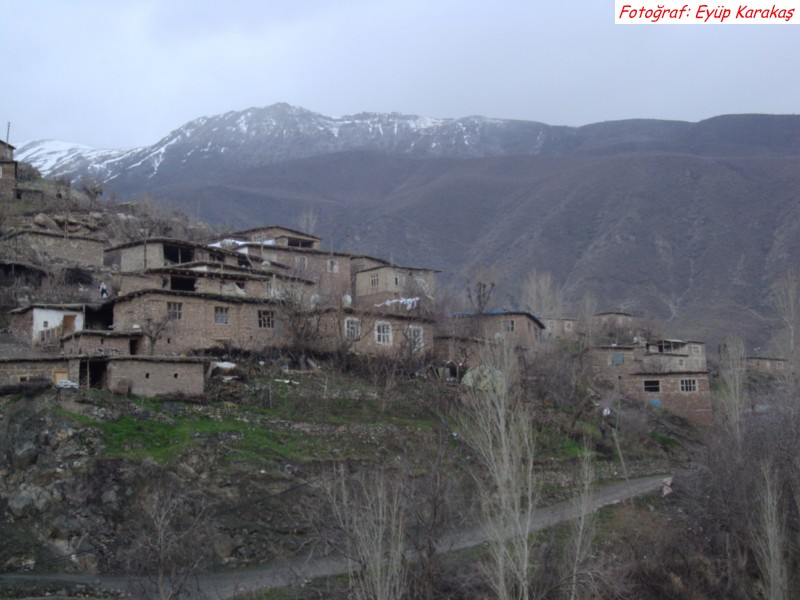

- Location within Turkey
- Coordinates: 37.976°N 42.646°E
- Country: Turkey
- Province: Siirt
- District: Pervari
- Population (2021): 2,123
- Time zone: UTC+3 (TRT)

Beğendik (Kurdish: Bêdar) is a municipality in the Pervari District of Siirt Province in Turkey. It is populated by Kurds of the Adiyan and Şakiran tribes. It had a population of 2,123 in 2021.
