= Atabağı, Baykan =

Village in Siirt Province, Turkey

Atabağı
- Municipality
- Location in Turkey
- Coordinates: 38.061°N 41.662°E
- Country: Turkey
- Province: Siirt
- District: Baykan
- Population (2021): 3,468
- Time zone: UTC+3 (TRT)

Atabağı (Kurdish: Comanî, Armenian: Ճըման, romanized: Jyman) is a municipality (belde) in the Baykan District of Siirt Province in Turkey. It is populated by Kurds of the Babosî tribe and had a population of 3,468 in 2021.
