= Gökçebağ, Siirt =

Village in Siirt Province, Turkey

Gökçebağ
- Municipality
- Location in Turkey
- Coordinates: 37.903°N 41.877°E
- Country: Turkey
- Province: Siirt
- District: Siirt
- Population (2021): 1,741
- Time zone: UTC+3 (TRT)

Gökçebağ (Kurdish: Ciwanika) is a belde in the Siirt District of Siirt Province in Turkey. It is populated by Kurds and had a population of 1,741 in 2021.

Its neighborhoods are Bağlar, Koçpınar and Yenimahalle.
