= Pınarca, Siirt =

Village in Siirt Province, Turkey

Pınarca
- Village
- Location within Turkey
- Coordinates: 37.978°N 41.852°E
- Country: Turkey
- Province: Siirt
- District: Siirt
- Population (2021): 2,321
- Time zone: UTC+3 (TRT)

Pınarca (Armenian: Gazar; Kurdish: Kezer) is a village in the Siirt District of Siirt Province in Turkey. The village had a population of 2,321 in 2021.

According to the Armenian prelacy survey of 1878, the village included 16 Armenians. In 1902, it lacked an Armenian population, and in 1913, the village was exclusively Muslim with 25 households.

The hamlets of Akıncı and İnandik are attached to the village.
