= Veyselkarani =

Village in Siirt Province, Turkey

- Municipality
- Location in Turkey
- Coordinates: 38.132°N 41.714°E
- Country: Turkey
- Province: Siirt
- District: Baykan
- Population (2021): 6,094
- Time zone: UTC+3 (TRT)

Veyselkarani (Kurdish: Ziyaret) is a municipality (belde) in the Baykan District of Siirt Province in Turkey. The settlement is populated by Kurds of the Poran tribe and had a population of 6,094 in 2021.

The municipality is divided into the neighborhoods of Atatürk, Çay and Şeyhosman.
