= Köprübaşı, Siirt =

Village in Siirt Province, Turkey

Köprübaşı
- Village
- Location within Turkey
- Coordinates: 37°57′44″N 41°51′42″E
- Country: Turkey
- Province: Siirt
- District: Siirt
- Population (2021): 279
- Time zone: UTC+3 (TRT)

Köprübaşı (Kurdish: Malikoz) is a village in the Siirt District of Siirt Province in Turkey. The village had a population of 279 in 2021.

The hamlet of Söğütlü is attached to the village.
