= Baykan =

- Municipality
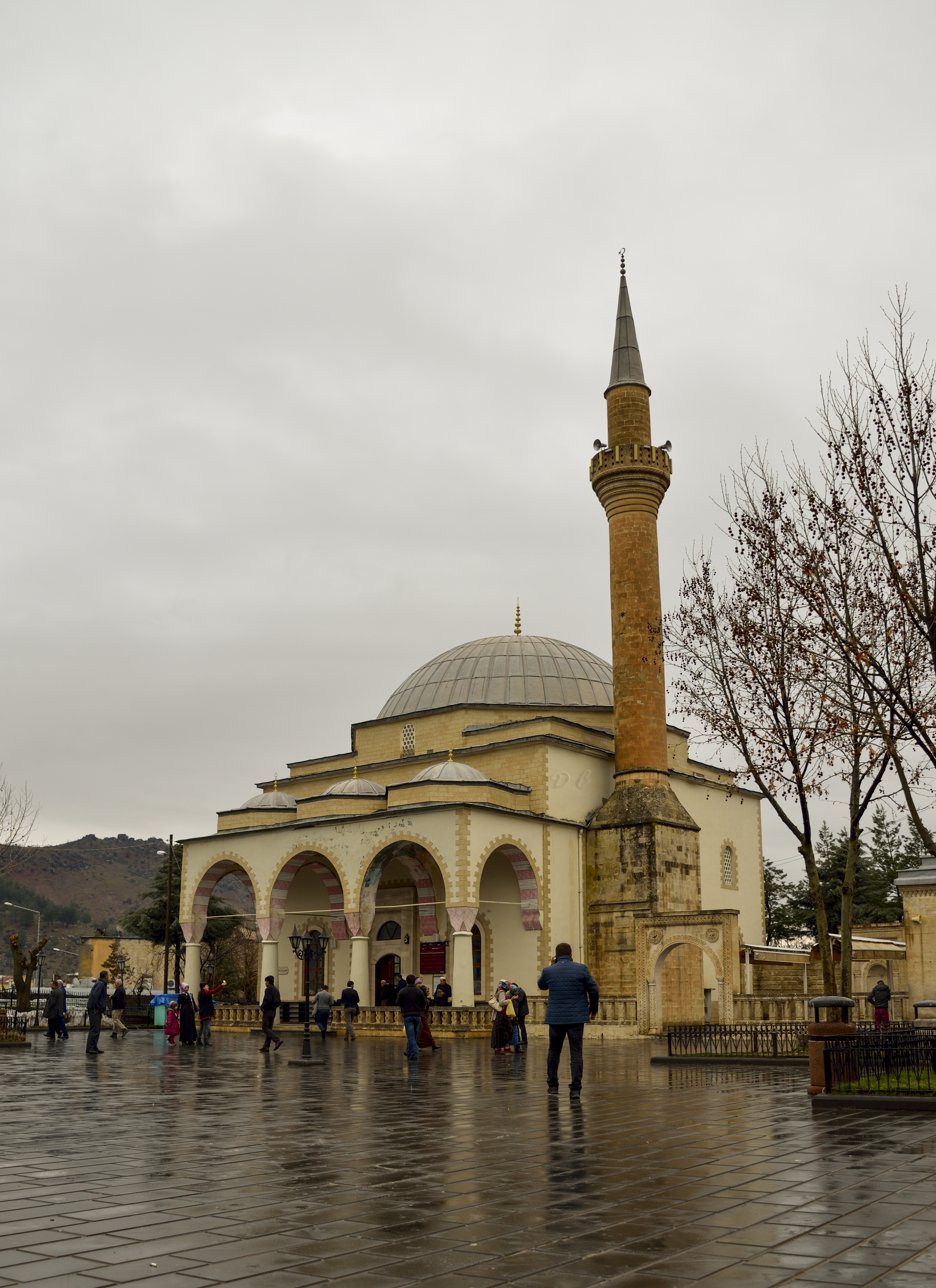
- Mosque and tomb of Uwais al-Qarani, Baykan

- Location within Turkey
- Coordinates: 38°09′50″N 41°47′05″E
- Country: Turkey
- Province: Siirt
- District: Baykan

Government
  - Mayor: Ekrem Erdem (AKP)
- Population (2021): 5,544
- Time zone: UTC+3 (TRT)
- Website: www.baykan.bel.tr

Baykan (Arabic: دير هابيل; Kurdish: Hawêl; Syriac: ܕܝܪܐ ܕܗܒܝܠ, romanized: Dayr Hābil) (Note: Alternatively transliterated as Avin, Avin Téravèl, Dayr-Hawil, Dayr Hāwīl or Dayr Hobīl. Also known as Hawell Monastery.) is a municipality in the Baykan District of the Siirt Province in Turkey. It is populated by Kurds and had a population of 5,544 in 2021. Baykan is divided into the neighbourhoods of Cefan, Havel, İnönü, Karşıyaka and Yenidoğan.

== History ==
Dayr Hābil (today called Baykan) was historically inhabited by Syriac Orthodox Christians. It is alternatively named as an Armenian village. A copy of the Gospel which contained the biography of Metropolitan Yuhanna of Mardin was sold to the church of the Monastery of Mar Abel in 1396. The Maphrian Basil Barsawma (r. 1422–1455) was a monk at the Monastery of Mar Habel. Ignatius Khalaf of Maʿdan, patriarch of Antioch (r. 1455–1483), was from the village of the Monastery of Hobīl.

In the Syriac Orthodox patriarchal register of dues of 1870, it was recorded that the village had 11 households, who paid 62 dues, and it did not have a priest. There was a church of Morī Ḥananyyā. In a letter from Priest Ibrahim to Patriarch Ignatius Abdul Masih II, it is recorded that the village was attacked by about 100 men of the Danabkta kochers led by two sons of the chief of the tribe, Mijdad Agha, on 15 October 1895, amidst the Hamidian massacres. The monastery and most of the houses were burned down and the villagers took refuge in friendly Muslim villages.

In the local elections in March 2019, Ramazan Sarsılmaz from the Peoples' Democratic Party (HDP) was elected mayor. Mehmet Tunç was appointed Kaymakam in September 2018. On 15 May 2020, Sarsılmaz was dismissed from his post, and Mehmet Tunç was appointed as the trustee of the municipality.

== Bibliography ==
- Avcıkıran, Adem (2009). Kürtçe Anamnez, Anamneza bi Kurmancî (in Kurdish and Turkish).
- Barsoum, Aphrem (2003). The Scattered Pearls: A History of Syriac Literature and Sciences. Translated by Matti Moosa (2nd ed.). Gorgias Press.
- Barsoum, Aphrem (2008). History of the Za'faran Monastery. Translated by Matti Moosa. Gorgias Press.
- Bcheiry, Iskandar (2009). The Syriac Orthodox Patriarchal Register of Dues of 1870: An Unpublished Historical Document from the Late Ottoman Period. Gorgias Press.
- Bcheiry, Iskandar (2013). The Account of the Syriac Orthodox Patriarch Yūḥanun Bar Šay Allāh (1483–1492): The Syriac Manuscript of Cambridge: DD.3.8(1). Gorgias Press.
- Dinno, Khalid S. (2017). The Syrian Orthodox Christians in the Late Ottoman Period and Beyond: Crisis then Revival. Gorgias Press.
- Verheij, Jelle (2017). ""The year of the firman:" The 1895 massacres in Hizan and Şirvan (Bitlis vilayet)". Études arméniennes contemporaines. 10 (10): 125–159.
- Wilmshurst, David (2016). Bar Hebraeus The Ecclesiastical Chronicle: An English Translation. Gorgias Press.
