= Pınarova, Siirt =

Village in Siirt Province, Turkey

Pınarova
- Village
- Location within Turkey
- Coordinates: 37.987°N 41.814°E
- Country: Turkey
- Province: Siirt
- District: Siirt
- Population (2021): 43
- Time zone: UTC+3 (TRT)

Pınarova (Armenian: Ayn Milk; Kurdish: Eyn Melek) is a village in the Siirt District of Siirt Province in Turkey. The village had a population of 43 in 2021.

According to the Armenian prelacy survey of 1878, the village was populated by 24 Armenians. In 1902, the village had 4–5 Armenian households and 10 Muslim households. In 1913, it was exclusively Muslim-populated with 10 households.
