= Aktaş, Siirt =

Village in Siirt Province, Turkey

Aktaş
- Village
- Location within Turkey
- Coordinates: 37.954°N 41.808°E
- Country: Turkey
- Province: Siirt
- District: Siirt
- Population (2021): 602
- Time zone: UTC+3 (TRT)

Aktaş (Armenian: Berhurk; Kurdish: Berhûrk) is a village in the Siirt District of Siirt Province in Turkey. The village is populated by Kurds and had a population of 602 in 2021.

The hamlets of Arpalı, Bakır, Düzlüce and Konaklı are attached to the village.

== History ==
According to the Armenian prelacy survey of 1878, the village was populated by 17 Armenians. In 1902, the village lacked an Armenian population, and in 1913, it was exclusively Muslim-populated with 25 households. The village was depopulated in the 1990s.
