= Botan River =

River in Siirt, Turkey

Coordinates: 37.7266°N 41.7764°E

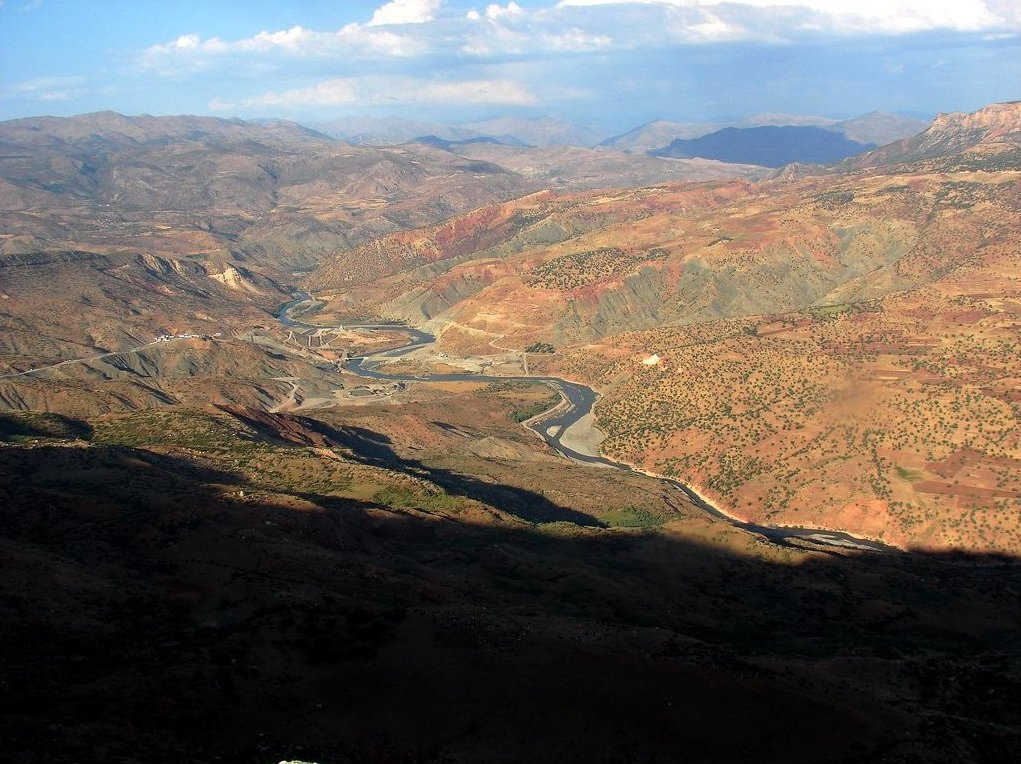
- Botan

Location
- Country: Turkey

Physical characteristics
- Mouth
  - location: Tigris River
- Discharge
  - average: 100 to 300 m^{3}/s (3,500 to 10,600 cu ft/s)

The Botan River (Note: Turkish: Botan Çayı, Botan Suyu, or Uluçay; Kurdish: Çemê Botanê; Armenian: Ջերմ, romanized: Jerm, lit. 'warm'; Syriac: ܒܵܘܗܬܵܢ ܨܘܼ bō(h)tān ṣū; Ancient Greek: Κεντρίτης, romanized: Kentrites) is located in the Siirt Province of southeastern Turkey. The upstream of the Botan River is often called Çatak, which flows mostly in the Van Province.

There is Botan Valley National Park in the area. The uppermost part of the Çatak River, west of the town of Çatak, is sometimes called Norduz. It originates in the high mountains around the Nordüz Plateau, near the border between Van and Hakkâri, and flows westwards before it turns to the northwest. The river has shaped a canyon on its way. The altitude difference between the valley and the top of the mountains reaches about 1,000 m (3,300 ft). The Çatak River is joined by the Büyükdere River at Çukurca, near Pervari in the Siirt Province, after which it is named Botan Suyu (Uluçay). Running westwards by east of Aydınlar and Siirt, it reaches Bostancık locality. Here, the rivers Zorava and Bitlis join the Botan. Finally at Çattepe in Siirt Province, it joins the Tigris River, after which the Tigris sharply turns southwards.

The discharge of Botan River from spring to mid-summer averages about 100–300 m³/s (3,500–11,000 cu ft/s), while it reaches in April and June about 400–600 m³/s (14,000–21,000 cu ft/s, and in May it peaks at about 700–1,000 m³/s (25,000–35,000 cu ft/s and sometimes more. At this time, it looks much bigger than the Tigris River. At the end of summer or in the fall, its depth is not less than 1 m (3.3 ft), and its outflow not less than around 60–80 m³/s (2,100–2,800 cu ft/s).

Crossing is only possible by boat. The river runs in narrow, deep and steep valleys. Lowlands are rare on its way, preventing it use for irrigation.

== Dams ==
For the purpose of building hydroelectric power plants, studies have been carried out on several places at the river. Seven dams in different sizes are planned, built or under construction on the Botan River.

The first dam and hydroelectric plant just below Aydınlar (Tillo) district has been completed. Officially named the "Alkumru Dam", it is also locally called the "Tillo Dam" due to the native name of the district. It is a rock-fill dam of height 110 m (360 ft) having 222 MW installed capacity. The amount of energy to be generated is 812 GWh, of which 350 GWh is firm energy The mean annual discharge is 129 m³/s (4,600 cu ft/s). Downstream of the Alkumru Dam is the Kirazlık Dam to regulate its outflows and produce hydroelectric power; an installed capacity of 45 MW.

The Çetin Dam, which is currently under construction, will have a 405 MW power capacity. The total investment amount for the project is expected to be approximately US$450 million. Construction on the Pervari Dam began in 2014 and the Keskin Dam is planned.

== In history ==
In his Anabasis, Xenophon describes the crossing of the Botan, then called the Centrites (Κεντρίτης). At that time, it formed the boundary between Corduene and Armenia.

== See also ==
- Beğendik Bridge, Turkey's highest and longest span balanced cantilever bridge
- Shattak
