= Pervari =

- Municipality
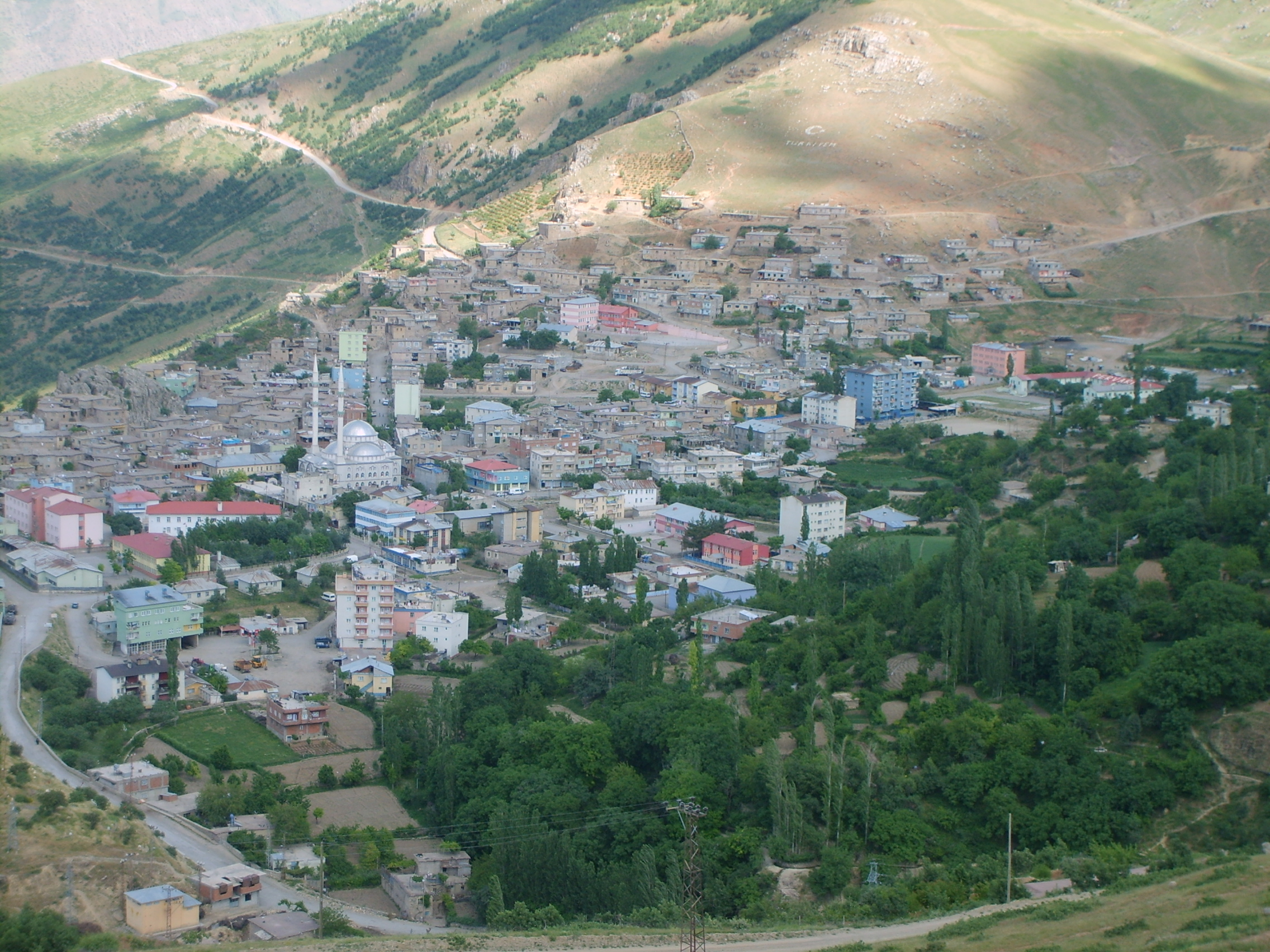
- A panoramic view of Pervari

- Location within Turkey
- Coordinates: 37°55′59″N 42°32′49″E
- Country: Turkey
- Province: Siirt
- District: Pervari

Government
  - Mayor: Teyyar Özcan (AKP)
- Population (2021): 6,261
- Time zone: UTC+3 (TRT)
- Website: www.pervari.bel.tr

Pervari (Kurdish: Berwarî, Armenian: Խոսխեր, romanized: Khoskher) is a town and seat of the Pervari District of Siirt Province in Turkey. It is populated by Kurds of the Adiyan and Şakiran tribes and had a population of 6,261 in 2021.

The town is divided into the two neighborhoods of Aydın and Şakiran.
