= Bidestan (disambiguation) =

Bidestan is a city in Alborz Province, Iran.

Bidestan or Bidastan (Persian: بيدستان) may also refer to:

- Bidestan, Firuzabad, Fars Province
- Bidestan, Kerman
- Bidestan, Khuzestan
- Bidastan, Kohgiluyeh and Boyer-Ahmad
- Bidastan-e Murderaz, Kohgiluyeh and Boyer-Ahmad Province
- Bidestan, Lorestan
- Bidestan, Torbat-e Heydarieh, Razavi Khorasan Province
- Bidestan, Torbat-e Jam, Razavi Khorasan Province
- Bidestan, Semnan
- Bidestan, South Khorasan
- Bidestan, Yazd
