= Darreh Zuleh =

Darreh Zuleh دره زوله
- Village
- Location within Iran
- Coordinates: 33°37′23″N 49°18′59″E
- Country: Iran
- Province: Lorestan
- County: Azna
- Bakhsh: Japelaq
- Rural District: Japelaq-e Gharbi

Population (2006)
  - Total: 28
- Time zone: UTC+3:30 (IRST)
  - Summer (DST): UTC+4:30 (IRDT)

Darreh Zuleh (Persian: دره زوله, also Romanized as Darreh Zūleh, Darreh-ye Zūleh, and Darreh Zūlleh) is a village in Japelaq-e Gharbi Rural District, Japelaq District, Azna County, Lorestan Province, Iran. At the 2006 census, its population was 28, in 7 families.
