= Mavedyn Vamhajryn =

Mavedyn Vamhajryn معاودين ومهاجرين
- camp and village
- Country: Iran
- Province: Lorestan
- County: Azna
- Bakhsh: Central
- Rural District: Silakhor-e Sharqi

Population (2006)
  - Total: 883
- Time zone: UTC+3:30 (IRST)
  - Summer (DST): UTC+4:30 (IRDT)

Mavedyn Vamhajryn (Persian: معاودين ومهاجرين; also known as Mavedyn Vamhajryn Camp (Persian: اردوگاه معاودين ومهاجرين, also Romanized as Ārdūgāh Mʿāūdīn Vamhājrīn) is a camp and village in Silakhor-e Sharqi Rural District, in the Central District of Azna County, Lorestan Province, Iran. At the 2006 census, its population was 883, in 186 families.
