= Kamian-e Bala =

Kamian-e Bala كاميان بالا
- Village
- Location within Iran
- Coordinates: 33°36′27″N 49°22′02″E
- Country: Iran
- Province: Lorestan
- County: Azna
- Bakhsh: Japelaq
- Rural District: Japelaq-e Gharbi

Population (2006)
  - Total: 79
- Time zone: UTC+3:30 (IRST)
  - Summer (DST): UTC+4:30 (IRDT)

Kamian-e Bala (Persian: كاميان بالا, also Romanized as Kāmīān-e Bālā and Kāmyān-e Bālā; also known as Kāmīān, Kāmīyān, and Kāmyān) is a village in Japelaq-e Gharbi Rural District, Japelaq District, Azna County, Lorestan Province, Iran. At the 2006 census, its population was 79, in 16 families.
