= Gombeh =

Gombeh گمبه
- Village
- Location within Iran
- Coordinates: 33°31′07″N 49°27′23″E
- Country: Iran
- Province: Lorestan
- County: Azna
- Bakhsh: Japelaq
- Rural District: Japelaq-e Sharqi

Population (2006)
  - Total: 106
- Time zone: UTC+3:30 (IRST)
  - Summer (DST): UTC+4:30 (IRDT)

Gombeh (Persian: گمبه, also known as Gomeh, Kāgheh, Kambeh, Kameh, and Kūmeh) is a village in Japelaq-e Sharqi Rural District, Japelaq District, Azna County, Lorestan Province, Iran. At the 2006 census, its population was 106, in 23 families.
