= Bidestaneh =

Bidestaneh بيدستانه
- Village
- Location within Iran
- Coordinates: 33°24′01″N 49°16′24″E
- Country: Iran
- Province: Lorestan
- County: Azna
- Bakhsh: Central
- Rural District: Silakhor-e Sharqi

Population (2006)
  - Total: 266
- Time zone: UTC+3:30 (IRST)
  - Summer (DST): UTC+4:30 (IRDT)

Bidestaneh (Persian: بيدستانه, also Romanized as Bīdestāneh) is a village in Silakhor-e Sharqi Rural District, in the Central District of Azna County, Lorestan Province, Iran. At the 2006 census, its population was 266, in 53 families.
