= Qataat, Lorestan =

Qataat قطعات
- Village
- Location within Iran
- Coordinates: 33°36′58″N 49°23′51″E
- Country: Iran
- Province: Lorestan
- County: Azna
- Bakhsh: Japelaq
- Rural District: Japelaq-e Gharbi

Population (2006)
  - Total: 50
- Time zone: UTC+3:30 (IRST)
  - Summer (DST): UTC+4:30 (IRDT)

Qataat (Persian: قطعات, also Romanized as Qaţa‘āt; also known as Qaţa‘āt Qeshlāq) is a village in Japelaq-e Gharbi Rural District, Japelaq District, Azna County, Lorestan Province, Iran. At the 2006 census, its population was 50, in 9 families.
