= Bozdash =

Bozdash بزداش
- Village
- Location within Iran
- Coordinates: 33°42′18″N 49°24′50″E
- Country: Iran
- Province: Lorestan
- County: Azna
- Bakhsh: Japelaq
- Rural District: Japelaq-e Gharbi

Population (2006)
  - Total: 65
- Time zone: UTC+3:30 (IRST)
  - Summer (DST): UTC+4:30 (IRDT)

Bozdash (Persian: بزداش, also Romanized as Bozdāsh) is a village in Japelaq-e Gharbi Rural District, Japelaq District, Azna County, Lorestan Province, Iran. At the 2006 census, its population was 65, in 15 families.
