= Kahriz-e Sefid =

Kahriz-e Sefid كهريزسفيد
- Village
- Location within Iran
- Coordinates: 33°33′03″N 49°26′51″E
- Country: Iran
- Province: Lorestan
- County: Azna
- Bakhsh: Japelaq
- Rural District: Japelaq-e Gharbi

Population (2006)
  - Total: 55
- Time zone: UTC+3:30 (IRST)
  - Summer (DST): UTC+4:30 (IRDT)

Kahriz-e Sefid (Persian: كهريزسفيد, also Romanized as Kahrīz-e Sefīd and Kahrīz Sefīd; also known as Ghār Safīd and Kard Sefīd) is a village in Japelaq-e Gharbi Rural District, Japelaq District, Azna County, Lorestan Province, Iran. At the 2006 census, its population was 55, in 14 families.
