= Tohfat al-Ahbab =

Persian dictionary from 1529/30

Tohfat al-Ahbab ("Gift for friends") is a Persian dictionary from Safavid Iran, which was composed by the poet and calligrapher Hafez Soltan-Ali Owbahi Heravi in 1529/30.

Owbahi claims that after discovering that the works of early Persian poets were being overlooked due to many of their Persian phrases being outdated, he became inspired to create a dictionary that would explain those phrases. However, in addition to names of people, places, and professions, his dictionary also includes a large number of Arabic and Turkic words, as well as many words from other Persian dialects, particularly from Transoxania. 2,483 words from Persian poetry are also quoted in the work. The majority of those cited poems were composed under the Samanid Empire (819–999) which ruled over Transoxania and Khorasan.

A significant dictionary, the Tohfat al-Ahbab has influenced later dictionaries like Farhang-e Soruri, Farhang-e Jahangiri and Farhang-e Rashidi.

== Sources ==
- Bayevsky, Solomon (2020). "Toḥfat al-aḥbāb". In Yarshater, Ehsan (ed.). Encyclopædia Iranica (Online ed.). Encyclopædia Iranica Foundation.
