= Dowlatabad, Azna =

Village in Lorestan province, Iran

Dowlatabad Persian: دولت اباد
- Village
- Location within Iran
- Coordinates: 33°23′12″N 49°27′37″E
- Country: Iran
- Province: Lorestan
- County: Azna
- District: Central
- Rural District: Pachehlak-e Gharbi

Population (2016)
  - Total: 621
- Time zone: UTC+3:30 (IRST)

Dowlatabad (Persian: دولت اباد) (Note: Also romanized as Dowlatābād; also known as Daulatābād) is a village in Pachehlak-e Gharbi Rural District of the Central District in Azna County, Lorestan province, Iran. It is located just to the southeast of Cheshmeh Soltan.

== Demographics ==
=== Population ===
At the time of the 2006 National Census, the village's population was 634 in 132 households. The following census in 2011 counted 582 people in 147 households. The 2016 census measured the population of the village as 621 people in 166 households.
