= Qarah Malek =

Qarah Malek قره ملك
- Village
- Location within Iran
- Coordinates: 33°43′16″N 49°37′00″E
- Country: Iran
- Province: Lorestan
- County: Azna
- Bakhsh: Japelaq
- Rural District: Japelaq-e Sharqi

Population (2006)
  - Total: 198
- Time zone: UTC+3:30 (IRST)
  - Summer (DST): UTC+4:30 (IRDT)

Qarah Malek (Persian: قره ملك, also Romanized as Ghareh Malek, Qara Milk, and Qareh Malek) is a village in Japelaq-e Sharqi Rural District, Japelaq District, Azna County, Lorestan Province, Iran. At the 2013 census, its population was 19, in 2 families.
