= Shah Valeh =

Shah Valeh شاهوله
- Village
- Location within Iran
- Coordinates: 33°34′31″N 49°26′21″E
- Country: Iran
- Province: Lorestan
- County: Azna
- Bakhsh: Japelaq
- Rural District: Japelaq-e Gharbi

Population (2006)
  - Total: 128
- Time zone: UTC+3:30 (IRST)
  - Summer (DST): UTC+4:30 (IRDT)

Shah Valeh (Persian: شاهوله, also Romanized as Shāh Valeh, Shāh Valī, Shāhveleh, and Shāh Waleh; also known as Shāh Valad) is a village in Japelaq-e Gharbi Rural District, Japelaq District, Azna County, Lorestan Province, Iran. At the 2006 census, its population was 128, in 35 families.
