= Choqa Mushan =

Choqa Mushan چقاموشان
- Village
- Location within Iran
- Coordinates: 33°33′49″N 49°22′32″E
- Country: Iran
- Province: Lorestan
- County: Azna
- Bakhsh: Japelaq
- Rural District: Japelaq-e Gharbi

Population (2006)
  - Total: 68
- Time zone: UTC+3:30 (IRST)
  - Summer (DST): UTC+4:30 (IRDT)

Choqa Mushan (Persian: چقاموشان, also Romanized as Choqā Mūshān, Chaqamīshān, Chaqā Mūshān, and Choghā Mūshān) is a village in Japelaq-e Gharbi Rural District, Japelaq District, Azna County, Lorestan Province, Iran. At the 2006 census, its population was 68, in 13 families.
