= Deh Darvishan =

Village in Lorestan, Iran

Deh Darvishan ده درويشان
- Village
- Location within Iran
- Coordinates: 33°17′35″N 49°29′28″E
- Country: Iran
- Province: Lorestan
- County: Azna
- Bakhsh: Central
- Rural District: Pachehlak-e Gharbi

Population (2006)
  - Total: 129
- Time zone: UTC+3:30 (IRST)
  - Summer (DST): UTC+4:30 (IRDT)

Deh Darvishan (Persian: ده درويشان, also Romanized as Deh Darvīshān and Deh Dorvīshan; also known as Deh Darvish-e ‘Azizābād and Deh-e Darvish (Persian: ده درویش), also Romanized as Deh-e Darvīsh) is a village in Pachehlak-e Gharbi Rural District, in the Central District of Azna County, Lorestan Province, Iran. At the 2006 census, its population was 129, in 21 families.
