= Cheshmeh Dargah =

Cheshmeh Dargah چشمه درگاه
- Village
- Location within Iran
- Coordinates: 33°31′01″N 49°25′03″E
- Country: Iran
- Province: Lorestan
- County: Azna
- Bakhsh: Japelaq
- Rural District: Japelaq-e Gharbi

Population (2006)
  - Total: 97
- Time zone: UTC+3:30 (IRST)
  - Summer (DST): UTC+4:30 (IRDT)

Cheshmeh Dargah (Persian: چشمه درگاه, also Romanized as Cheshmeh Dargāh, Cheshmeh-ye Dargāh, Chashmeh Dargāh, and Cheshyeh Dargāh) is a village in Japelaq-e Gharbi Rural District, Japelaq District, Azna County, Lorestan Province, Iran. At the 2006 census, its population was 97, in 20 families.
