= Siveleh =

Siveleh سيوله
- Village
- Location within Iran
- Coordinates: 33°20′38″N 49°26′08″E
- Country: Iran
- Province: Lorestan
- County: Azna
- Bakhsh: Central
- Rural District: Pachehlak-e Gharbi

Population (2006)
  - Total: 212
- Time zone: UTC+3:30 (IRST)
  - Summer (DST): UTC+4:30 (IRDT)

Siveleh (Persian: سيوله, also romanized as Sīveleh and Sivaleh) is a small village in Pachehlak-e Gharbi Rural District, in the Central District of Azna County, Lorestan Province, Iran. At the 2006 census, its population was 212, in 43 families.
