= Shahrak-e Almahdi =

Neighborhood in Lorestan province, Iran

Shahrak-e Almahdi Persian: شهرك المهدي
- Neighborhood
- Location within Iran
- Coordinates: 33°26′28″N 49°29′43″E
- Country: Iran
- Province: Lorestan
- County: Azna
- District: Central
- City: Azna

Population (2011)
  - Total: 4,261
- Time zone: UTC+3:30 (IRST)

Shahrak-e Almahdi (Persian: شهرك المهدي) (Note: Also romanized as Shahrak-e Almahdī) is a neighborhood in the city of Azna in the Central District of Azna County, Lorestan province, Iran.

== Demographics ==
=== Population ===
At the time of the 2006 National Census, Shahrak-e Almahdi's population was 4,116 in 958 households, when it was a village in, and the capital of, Pachehlak-e Gharbi Rural District. The following census in 2011 counted 4,261 people in 1,158 households. After the census, the village was annexed by the city of Azna.
