= Shah Pahneh =

Shah Pahneh شاه پهنه
- Village
- Location within Iran
- Coordinates: 33°43′03″N 49°24′05″E
- Country: Iran
- Province: Lorestan
- County: Azna
- Bakhsh: Japelaq
- Rural District: Japelaq-e Gharbi

Population (2006)
  - Total: 47
- Time zone: UTC+3:30 (IRST)
  - Summer (DST): UTC+4:30 (IRDT)

Shah Pahneh (Persian: شاه پهنه, also Romanized as Shāh Pahneh and Shāpahneh) is a village in Japelaq-e Gharbi Rural District, Japelaq District, Azna County, Lorestan Province, Iran. At the 2006 census, its population was 47, in 12 families.
