= Khorusan =

Khorusan خروسان
- Village
- Location within Iran
- Coordinates: 33°40′13″N 49°33′32″E
- Country: Iran
- Province: Lorestan
- County: Azna
- Bakhsh: Japelaq
- Rural District: Japelaq-e Sharqi

Population (2006)
  - Total: 277
- Time zone: UTC+3:30 (IRST)
  - Summer (DST): UTC+4:30 (IRDT)

Khorusan (Persian: خروسان, also Romanized as Khorūsān, Khoroosan, Khowrīshān, and Khurīshān) is a village in Japelaq-e Sharqi Rural District, Japelaq District, Azna County, Lorestan Province, Iran. At the 2006 census, its population was 277, in 74 families.
