= Chahar Cheshmeh-ye Nazem =

Chahar Cheshmeh-ye Nazem چهارچشمه ناظم
- Village
- Location within Iran
- Coordinates: 33°33′48″N 49°23′52″E
- Country: Iran
- Province: Lorestan
- County: Azna
- Bakhsh: Japelaq
- Rural District: Japelaq-e Gharbi

Population (2006)
  - Total: 195
- Time zone: UTC+3:30 (IRST)
  - Summer (DST): UTC+4:30 (IRDT)

Chahar Cheshmeh-ye Nazem (Persian: چهارچشمه ناظم, also Romanized as Chahār Cheshmeh-ye Nāz̧em; also known as Chahār Cheshmeh) is a village in Japelaq-e Gharbi Rural District, Japelaq District, Azna County, Lorestan Province, Iran. At the 2006 census, its population was 195, in 41 families.
