= Perchestan =

Perchestan پرچستان
- Village
- Location within Iran
- Coordinates: 33°38′00″N 49°22′49″E
- Country: Iran
- Province: Lorestan
- County: Azna
- Bakhsh: Japelaq
- Rural District: Japelaq-e Gharbi

Population (2006)
  - Total: 163
- Time zone: UTC+3:30 (IRST)
  - Summer (DST): UTC+4:30 (IRDT)

Perchestan (Persian: پرچستان, also Romanized as Perchestān and Parchestān) is a village in Japelaq-e Gharbi Rural District, Japelaq District, Azna County, Lorestan Province, Iran. At the 2006 census, its population was 163, in 39 families.
