= Molla Taleb =

Molla Taleb ملاطالب
- Village
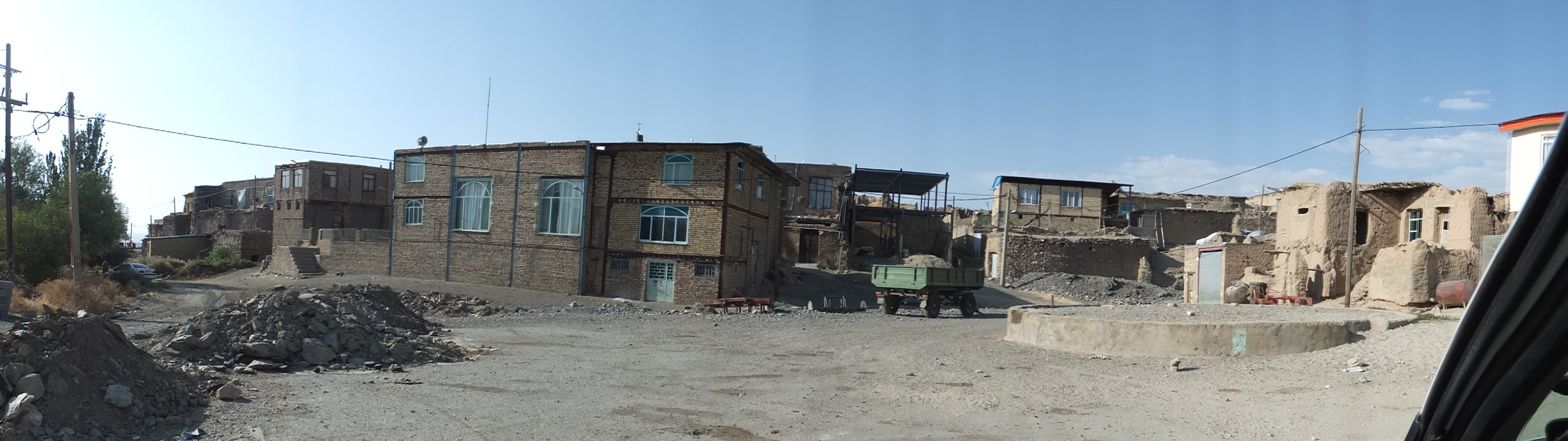

- Location within Iran
- Coordinates: 33°33′33″N 49°38′16″E
- Country: Iran
- Province: Lorestan
- County: Azna
- Bakhsh: Japelaq
- Rural District: Japelaq-e Sharqi

Population (2006)
  - Total: 115
- Time zone: UTC+3:30 (IRST)
  - Summer (DST): UTC+4:30 (IRDT)

Molla Taleb (Persian: ملاطالب, also Romanized as Mollā Ţāleb) is a village in Japelaq-e Sharqi Rural District, Japelaq District, Azna County, Lorestan Province, Iran. At the 2006 census, its population was 115, in 27 families.
