= Baba Dineh =

Baba Dineh بابادينه
- Village
- Location within Iran
- Coordinates: 33°29′50″N 49°35′47″E
- Country: Iran
- Province: Lorestan
- County: Azna
- Bakhsh: Central
- Rural District: Pachehlak-e Gharbi

Population (2006)
  - Total: 29
- Time zone: UTC+3:30 (IRST)
  - Summer (DST): UTC+4:30 (IRDT)

Baba Dineh (Persian: بابادينه, also Romanized as Bābā Dīneh) is a village in Pachehlak-e Gharbi Rural District, in the Central District of Azna County, Lorestan Province, Iran. At the 2006 census, its population was 29, in 7 families.
