= Charkhestan =

Charkhestan چرخستان
- Village
- Location within Iran
- Coordinates: 33°39′46″N 49°22′57″E
- Country: Iran
- Province: Lorestan
- County: Azna
- Bakhsh: Japelaq
- Rural District: Japelaq-e Gharbi

Population (2006)
  - Total: 173
- Time zone: UTC+3:30 (IRST)
  - Summer (DST): UTC+4:30 (IRDT)

Charkhestan (Persian: چرخستان, also Romanized as Charkhestān and Charkhistān) is a village in Japelaq-e Gharbi Rural District, Japelaq District, Azna County, Lorestan Province, Iran. At the 2006 census, its population was 173, in 52 families.
