= Aq Bolagh-e Mohammad Vali =

Aq Bolagh-e Mohammad Vali اقبلاغ محمدولي
- Village
- Location within Iran
- Coordinates: 33°37′12″N 49°16′12″E
- Country: Iran
- Province: Lorestan
- County: Azna
- Bakhsh: Japelaq
- Rural District: Japelaq-e Gharbi

Population (2006)
  - Total: 102
- Time zone: UTC+3:30 (IRST)
  - Summer (DST): UTC+4:30 (IRDT)

Aq Bolagh-e Mohammad Vali (Persian: اقبلاغ محمدولي, also Romanized as Āq Bolāgh-e Moḩammad Valī) is a village in Japelaq-e Gharbi Rural District, Japelaq District, Azna County, Lorestan Province, Iran. At the 2006 census, its population was 102, in 22 families.
