= Do Bolukan =

Do Bolukan دوبلوكان
- Village
- Location within Iran
- Coordinates: 33°21′21″N 49°26′26″E
- Country: Iran
- Province: Lorestan
- County: Azna
- Bakhsh: Central
- Rural District: Pachehlak-e Gharbi

Population (2006)
  - Total: 193
- Time zone: UTC+3:30 (IRST)
  - Summer (DST): UTC+4:30 (IRDT)

Do Bolukan (Persian: دوبلوكان, also Romanized as Do Bolūkān and Dow Bolūkān; also known as Dombaleh Kūh, Do Molūkān, Dow Malkān, and Dumalikān) is a village in Pachehlak-e Gharbi Rural District, in the Central District of Azna County, Lorestan Province, Iran. At the 2006 census, its population was 193, in 33 families.
