= Kerchian =

Kerchian كرچيان
- Village
- Location within Iran
- Coordinates: 33°24′37″N 49°19′37″E
- Country: Iran
- Province: Lorestan
- County: Azna
- Bakhsh: Central
- Rural District: Silakhor-e Sharqi

Population (2006)
  - Total: 257
- Time zone: UTC+3:30 (IRST)
  - Summer (DST): UTC+4:30 (IRDT)

Kerchian (Persian: كرچيان, also Romanized as Kerchīān, Karchīān, and Kercheyān) is a village in Silakhor-e Sharqi Rural District, in the Central District of Azna County, Lorestan Province, Iran. At the 2006 census, its population was 257, in 51 families.
