= Kartilan =

Kartilan كرتيلان
- Village
- Location within Iran
- Coordinates: 33°39′54″N 49°30′11″E
- Country: Iran
- Province: Lorestan
- County: Azna
- Bakhsh: Japelaq
- Rural District: Japelaq-e Sharqi

Population (2006)
  - Total: 172
- Time zone: UTC+3:30 (IRST)
  - Summer (DST): UTC+4:30 (IRDT)

Kartilan (Persian: كرتيلان, also Romanized as Karţīlān and Karţalān) is a village in Japelaq-e Sharqi Rural District, Japelaq District, Azna County, Lorestan Province, Iran. At the 2006 census, its population was 172, in 48 families.
