= Tian, Azna =

Village in Lorestan province, Iran

Tian Persian: تيان
- Village
- Location within Iran
- Coordinates: 33°25′08″N 49°17′08″E
- Country: Iran
- Province: Lorestan
- County: Azna
- District: Central
- Rural District: Silakhor-e Sharqi

Population (2016)
  - Total: 623
- Time zone: UTC+3:30 (IRST)

Tian (Persian: تيان) (Note: Also romanized as Tīān and Ţīān; also known as Qāsimābād, Tayūn, Tbiān, and Zīān) is a village in Silakhor-e Sharqi Rural District of the Central District in Azna County, Lorestan province, Iran.

== Demographics ==
=== Population ===
At the time of the 2006 National Census, the village's population was 637 in 118 households. The following census in 2011 counted 688 people in 153 households. The 2016 census measured the population of the village as 623 people in 182 households.
