= Zarnan, Lorestan =

Village in Lorestan province, Iran

Zarnan Persian: زرنان
- Village
- Location within Iran
- Coordinates: 33°29′30″N 49°22′22″E
- Country: Iran
- Province: Lorestan
- County: Azna
- District: Central
- Rural District: Silakhor-e Sharqi

Population (2016)
  - Total: 545
- Time zone: UTC+3:30 (IRST)

Zarnan (Persian: زرنان) (Note: Also romanized as Zarnān; also known as Zarna) is a village in Silakhor-e Sharqi Rural District of the Central District in Azna County, Lorestan province, Iran.

== Demographics ==
=== Population ===
At the time of the 2006 National Census, the village's population was 647 in 141 households. The following census in 2011 counted 587 people in 161 households. The 2016 census measured the population of the village as 545 people in 153 households.
