= Aqai, Azna =

Village in Lorestan province, Iran

Aqai Persian: اقايي
- Village
- Location within Iran
- Coordinates: 33°33′33″N 49°25′48″E
- Country: Iran
- Province: Lorestan
- County: Azna
- District: Japelaq
- Rural District: Japelaq-e Gharbi

Population (2016)
  - Total: 107
- Time zone: UTC+3:30 (IRST)

Aqai (Persian: اقايي) (Note: Also romanized as Āqā’ī; also known as Āgoya and Ākūyeh) is a village in Japelaq-e Gharbi Rural District of Japelaq District in Azna County in Lorestan province, Iran.

== Demographics ==
=== Population ===
At the time of the 2006 National Census, the village's population was 172 in 36 households. The following census in 2011 counted 111 people in 30 households. The 2016 census measured the population of the village as 107 people in 36 households.
