= Qaleh-ye Rostam, Lorestan =

Village in Lorestan province, Iran

Qaleh-ye Rostam Persian: قلعه رستم
- Village
- Location within Iran
- Coordinates: 33°24′34″N 49°15′17″E
- Country: Iran
- Province: Lorestan
- County: Azna
- District: Central
- Rural District: Silakhor-e Sharqi

Population (2016)
  - Total: 588
- Time zone: UTC+3:30 (IRST)

Qaleh-ye Rostam (Persian: قلعه رستم) (Note: Also romanized as Qal‘eh Rostam and Qal‘eh-ye Rostam) is a village in Silakhor-e Sharqi Rural District of the Central District in Azna County, Lorestan province, Iran.

== Demographics ==
=== Population ===
At the time of the 2006 National Census, the village's population was 658 in 130 households. The following census in 2011 counted 691 people in 169 households. The 2016 census measured the population of the village as 588 people in 146 households.
