= Davud-e Peyghambar =

Village in Lorestan province, Iran

Davud-e Peyghambar Persian: داودپيغمبر
- Village
- Location within Iran
- Coordinates: 33°41′27″N 49°23′33″E
- Country: Iran
- Province: Lorestan
- County: Azna
- District: Japelaq
- Rural District: Japelaq-e Gharbi

Population (2016)
  - Total: 150
- Time zone: UTC+3:30 (IRST)

Davud-e Peyghambar (Persian: داودپيغمبر) (Note: Also romanized as Dāvūd Peyghambar, Dāvūd Peyghamber, and Dāvūd-e Peyghambar; also known as Dāūd Paighambar) is a village in Japelaq-e Gharbi Rural District of Japelaq District in Azna County in Lorestan province, Iran.

== Demographics ==
=== Population ===
At the time of the 2006 National Census, the village's population was 160 in 39 households. The following census in 2011 counted 112 people in 37 households. The 2016 census measured the population of the village as 150 people in 54 households.
