= Emamzadeh Qasem, Lorestan =

Village in Lorestan province, Iran

Emamzadeh Qasem Persian: امام زاده قاسم
- Village
- Location within Iran
- Coordinates: 33°40′12″N 49°30′46″E
- Country: Iran
- Province: Lorestan
- County: Azna
- District: Japelaq
- Rural District: Japelaq-e Sharqi

Population (2016)
  - Total: 311
- Time zone: UTC+3:30 (IRST)

Emamzadeh Qasem (Persian: امام زاده قاسم) (Note: Also romanized as Emāmzādeh Qāsem; also known as Emamzadeh Ghasem and Imāmzādeh Qāsim) is a village in Japelaq-e Sharqi Rural District of Japelaq District in Azna County, Lorestan province, Iran.

== Demographics ==
=== Population ===
At the time of the 2006 National Census, the village's population was 258 in 81 households. The following census in 2011 counted 209 people in 72 households. The 2016 census measured the population of the village as 311 people in 101 households.
