= Gavbar-e Sofla =

Village in Lorestan province, Iran

Gavbar-e Sofla Persian: گاوبارسفلي
- Village
- Location within Iran
- Coordinates: 33°36′55″N 49°31′00″E
- Country: Iran
- Province: Lorestan
- County: Azna
- District: Japelaq
- Rural District: Japelaq-e Sharqi

Population (2016)
  - Total: 240
- Time zone: UTC+3:30 (IRST)

Gavbar-e Sofla (Persian: گاوبارسفلي) (Note: Also romanized as Gav Bar Sofla and Gāvbār-e Soflá; also known as Gāvbar-e Pā’īn, Gāvbār-e Pā’īn, and Gāvbor-e Pā’īn) is a village in Japelaq-e Sharqi Rural District of Japelaq District in Azna County, Lorestan province, Iran.

== Demographics ==
=== Population ===
At the time of the 2006 National Census, the village's population was 349 in 84 households. The following census in 2011 counted 303 people in 99 households. The 2016 census measured the population of the village as 240 people in 75 households.
