= Nosratabad, Azna =

Village in Lorestan province, Iran

Nosratabad Persian: نصرت‌آباد
- Village
- Location within Iran
- Coordinates: 33°21′48″N 49°23′44″E
- Country: Iran
- Province: Lorestan
- County: Azna
- District: Central
- Rural District: Pachehlak-e Gharbi

Population (2016)
  - Total: 462
- Time zone: UTC+3:30 (IRST)

Nosratabad (Persian: نصرت‌آباد) (Note: Also romanized as Noşratābād) is a village in Pachehlak-e Gharbi Rural District of the Central District in Azna County, Lorestan province, Iran.

== Demographics ==
=== Population ===
At the time of the 2006 National Census, the village's population was 497 in 95 households. The following census in 2011 counted 535 people in 143 households. The 2016 census measured the population of the village as 462 people in 134 households.
