= Pazardalu =

Village in Lorestan province, Iran

Pazardalu Persian: پازردالو
- Village
- Location within Iran
- Coordinates: 33°26′46″N 49°14′22″E
- Country: Iran
- Province: Lorestan
- County: Azna
- District: Central
- Rural District: Silakhor-e Sharqi

Population (2016)
  - Total: 491
- Time zone: UTC+3:30 (IRST)

Pazardalu (Persian: پازردالو) (Note: Also romanized as Pāzardālū; also known as Monirabad (مُنير آباد), also romanized as Monīrābād) is a village in Silakhor-e Sharqi Rural District of the Central District in Azna County, Lorestan province, Iran.

== Demographics ==
=== Population ===
At the time of the 2006 National Census, the village's population was 319 in 68 households. The following census in 2011 counted 533 people in 118 households. The 2016 census measured the population of the village as 491 people in 127 households.
