= Galeh, Lorestan =

Village in Lorestan province, Iran

Galeh Persian: گله
- Village
- Location within Iran
- Coordinates: 33°40′53″N 49°23′55″E
- Country: Iran
- Province: Lorestan
- County: Azna
- District: Japelaq
- Rural District: Japelaq-e Gharbi

Population (2016)
  - Total: 225
- Time zone: UTC+3:30 (IRST)

Galeh (Persian: گله) (Note: Also romanized as Gelleh; also known as Kīla and Kīleh) is a village in Japelaq-e Gharbi Rural District of Japelaq District in Azna County in Lorestan province, Iran.

== Demographics ==
=== Population ===
At the time of the 2006 National Census, the village's population was 299 in 60 households. The following census in 2011 counted 201 people in 59 households. The 2016 census measured the population of the village as 225 people in 72 households.
