= Borjeleh =

Village in Lorestan province, Iran

Borjeleh Persian: برجله
- Village
- Location within Iran
- Coordinates: 33°25′06″N 49°26′21″E
- Country: Iran
- Province: Lorestan
- County: Azna
- District: Central
- Rural District: Pachehlak-e Gharbi

Population (2016)
  - Total: 573
- Time zone: UTC+3:30 (IRST)

Borjeleh (Persian: برجله) (Note: Also known as Barchaleh, Borjlah, and Rajeleh) is a village in Pachehlak-e Gharbi Rural District of the Central District in Azna County, Lorestan province, Iran.

== Demographics ==
=== Population ===
At the time of the 2006 National Census, the village's population was 506 in 92 households. The following census in 2011 counted 525 people in 133 households. The 2016 census measured the population of the village as 573 people in 162 households.
