= Panj Zowj =

Village in Lorestan province, Iran

Panj Zowj Persian: پنج زوج
- Village
- Location within Iran
- Coordinates: 33°42′08″N 49°23′08″E
- Country: Iran
- Province: Lorestan
- County: Azna
- District: Japelaq
- Rural District: Japelaq-e Gharbi

Population (2016)
  - Total: 129
- Time zone: UTC+3:30 (IRST)

Panj Zowj (Persian: پنج زوج) is a village in Japelaq-e Gharbi Rural District of Japelaq District in Azna County in Lorestan province, Iran.

== Demographics ==
=== Population ===
At the time of the 2006 National Census, the village's population was 163 in 39 households. The following census in 2011 counted 128 people in 41 households. The 2016 census measured the population of the village as 129 people in 49 households.
