= Hashvid =

Hashvid (Persian: حشويد) may refer to:

- Hashvid, Azna, Iran
- Hashvid, Dorud, Iran
