= Kolbor =

Village in Lorestan province, Iran

Kolbor Persian: كلبر
- Village
- Location within Iran
- Coordinates: 33°37′17″N 49°23′53″E
- Country: Iran
- Province: Lorestan
- County: Azna
- District: Japelaq
- Rural District: Japelaq-e Gharbi

Population (2016)
  - Total: 194
- Time zone: UTC+3:30 (IRST)

Kolbor (Persian: كلبر) (Note: Also known as Golbār, Golpar, and Gulbar) is a village in Japelaq-e Gharbi Rural District of Japelaq District in Azna County in Lorestan province, Iran.

== Demographics ==
=== Population ===
At the time of the 2006 National Census, the village's population was 314 in 72 households. The following census in 2011 counted 224 people in 79 households. The 2016 census measured the population of the village as 194 people in 73 households.
