= Kalkaleh =

Village in Lorestan province, Iran

Kalkaleh Persian: كلكله
- Village
- Location within Iran
- Coordinates: 33°26′59″N 49°15′28″E
- Country: Iran
- Province: Lorestan
- County: Azna
- District: Central
- Rural District: Silakhor-e Sharqi

Population (2016)
  - Total: 1,111
- Time zone: UTC+3:30 (IRST)

Kalkaleh (Persian: كلكله) is a village in Silakhor-e Sharqi Rural District of the Central District in Azna County, Lorestan province, Iran.

== Demographics ==
=== Population ===
At the time of the 2006 National Census, the village's population was 939 in 210 households. The following census in 2011 counted 1,162 people in 295 households. The 2016 census measured the population of the village as 1,111 people in 295 households.
