= Darreh Takht =

Village in Lorestan province, Iran

Darreh Takht Persian: دره تخت
- Village
- Location within Iran
- Coordinates: 33°22′29″N 49°22′58″E
- Country: Iran
- Province: Lorestan
- County: Azna
- District: Central
- Rural District: Pachehlak-e Gharbi

Population (2016)
  - Total: 417
- Time zone: UTC+3:30 (IRST)

Darreh Takht (Persian: دره تخت) is a village in Pachehlak-e Gharbi Rural District of the Central District in Azna County, Lorestan province, Iran.

== Demographics ==
=== Population ===
At the time of the 2006 National Census, the village's population was 413 in 83 households. The following census in 2011 counted 425 people in 108 households. The 2016 census measured the population of the village as 417 people in 124 households.
