= Rashidi =

Rashidi may refer to:

- Rashidi dynasty, ruling family in Arabia

== People ==
- Abdullah Al-Rashidi (born 1963), Kuwaiti sports shooter
- Ahmed Al Rashidi (born 1984), Kuwaiti footballer
- Ahmed Rashidi, Moroccan extrajudicial prisoner of the United States
- Ali Muhammad Rashidi (1905–1987), Pakistani politician
- Davoud Rashidi (1933–2016), Iranian actor
- Eid Al-Rashidi (1999), Kuwaiti footballer
- Fahad Al-Rashidi (footballer, born 1997), Saudi footballer
- Khaled Al-Rashidi (born 1987), Kuwaiti footballer
- Musaid al-Rashidi (1962-2017), Saudi poet and military officer
- Narges Rashidi (born 1980), American-German actress
- Rouzbeh Rashidi (born 1980), Iranian avant-garde filmmaker
- Runoko Rashidi (1954–2021), American historian
- Seif Rashidi (born 1957), Tanzanian politician
- Talal Al-Rashidi (born 1993), Kuwaiti sports shooter

== Places ==
- Rashidi, Iran, a village in Lorestan Province

== Literature ==
- Farhang-i Rashidi, 17th-century Persian dictionary

== See also ==
- Al-Rashid (disambiguation)
