= Masoudabad, Lorestan =

Village in Lorestan province, Iran

Masoudabad Persian: مسعوداباد
- Village
- Location within Iran
- Coordinates: 33°31′35″N 49°20′37″E
- Country: Iran
- Province: Lorestan
- County: Azna
- District: Central
- Rural District: Silakhor-e Sharqi

Population (2016)
  - Total: 629
- Time zone: UTC+3:30 (IRST)

Masoudabad (Persian: مسعوداباد) (Note: Also romanized as Mas‘ūdābād; also known as Maqsudabad (مَقصود آباد), also romanized as Maqşūdābād) is a village in Silakhor-e Sharqi Rural District of the Central District in Azna County, Lorestan province, Iran.

== Demographics ==
=== Population ===
At the time of the 2006 National Census, the village's population was 762 in 173 households. The following census in 2011 counted 691 people in 193 households. The 2016 census measured the population of the village as 629 people in 190 households.
