= Hashvid, Azna =

Hashvid حشويد
- Village
- Location within Iran
- Coordinates: 33°22′45″N 49°28′39″E
- Country: Iran
- Province: Lorestan
- County: Azna
- Bakhsh: Central
- Rural District: Pachehlak-e Gharbi

Population (2006)
  - Total: 287
- Time zone: UTC+3:30 (IRST)
  - Summer (DST): UTC+4:30 (IRDT)

Hashvid (Persian: حشويد, also Romanized as Hashvīd and Ḩashvīd; also known as Harshvīd and HNshvīd) is a village in Pachehlak-e Gharbi Rural District, in the Central District of Azna County, Lorestan Province, Iran. At the 2006 census, its population was 287, in 66 families.
