= Hush, Lorestan =

Hush هوش
- Village
- Location within Iran
- Coordinates: 33°35′45″N 49°24′53″E
- Country: Iran
- Province: Lorestan
- County: Azna
- Bakhsh: Japelaq
- Rural District: Japelaq-e Gharbi

Population (2006)
  - Total: 45
- Time zone: UTC+3:30 (IRST)
  - Summer (DST): UTC+4:30 (IRDT)

Hush (Persian: هوش, also Romanized as Hūsh and Hosh) is a village in Japelaq-e Gharbi Rural District, Japelaq District, Azna County, Lorestan Province, Iran. At the 2006 census, its population was 45, in 11 families.
