= Rashidi, Iran =

Rashidi رشيدی
- village
- Location within Iran
- Coordinates: 33°34′15″N 49°37′30″E
- Country: Iran
- Province: Lorestan
- County: Azna
- Bakhsh: Japelaq
- Rural District: Japelaq-e Sharqi

Population (2006)
  - Total: 126
- Time zone: UTC+3:30 (IRST)
  - Summer (DST): UTC+4:30 (IRDT)

Rashidi (Persian: رشيدی, also Romanized as Rashīdī) is a village in Japelaq-e Sharqi Rural District, Japelaq District, Azna County, Lorestan Province, Iran. At the 2006 census, its population was 126, in 31 families.
