= Malicheh, Lorestan =

Village in Lorestan province, Iran

Malicheh Persian: ماليچه
- Village
- Location within Iran
- Coordinates: 33°37′50″N 49°20′15″E
- Country: Iran
- Province: Lorestan
- County: Azna
- District: Japelaq
- Rural District: Japelaq-e Gharbi

Population (2016)
  - Total: 353
- Time zone: UTC+3:30 (IRST)

Malicheh (Persian: ماليچه) (Note: Also romanized as Mālīcheh) is a village in Japelaq-e Gharbi Rural District of Japelaq District in Azna County in Lorestan province, Iran.

== Demographics ==
=== Population ===
At the time of the 2006 National Census, the village's population was 402 in 103 households. The following census in 2011 counted 272 people in 91 households. The 2016 census measured the population of the village as 353 people in 126 households.
