= Kamari, Lorestan =

Kamari كمري
- Village
- Location within Iran
- Coordinates: 33°28′06″N 49°28′22″E
- Country: Iran
- Province: Lorestan
- County: Azna
- Bakhsh: Central
- Rural District: Pachehlak-e Gharbi

Population (2006)
  - Total: 127
- Time zone: UTC+3:30 (IRST)
  - Summer (DST): UTC+4:30 (IRDT)

Kamari (Persian: كمري, also Romanized as Kamarī and Gamarī) is a village in Pachehlak-e Gharbi Rural District, in the Central District of Azna County, Lorestan Province, Iran. At the 2006 census, its population was 127, in 23 families.
