= Mian Rudan, Lorestan =

Mian Rudan ميان رودان
- Village
- Location within Iran
- Coordinates: 33°26′21″N 49°15′04″E
- Country: Iran
- Province: Lorestan
- County: Azna
- Bakhsh: Central
- Rural District: Silakhor-e Sharqi

Population (2006)
  - Total: 168
- Time zone: UTC+3:30 (IRST)
  - Summer (DST): UTC+4:30 (IRDT)

Mian Rudan (Persian: ميان رودان, also Romanized as Mīān Rūdān and Meyānrūdān; also known as Mīāndūrān) is a village in Silakhor-e Sharqi Rural District, in the Central District of Azna County, Lorestan Province, Iran. At the 2006 census, its population was 168, in 35 families.
