= Gorji, Lorestan =

Village in Lorestan province, Iran

Gorji Persian: گرجي
- Village
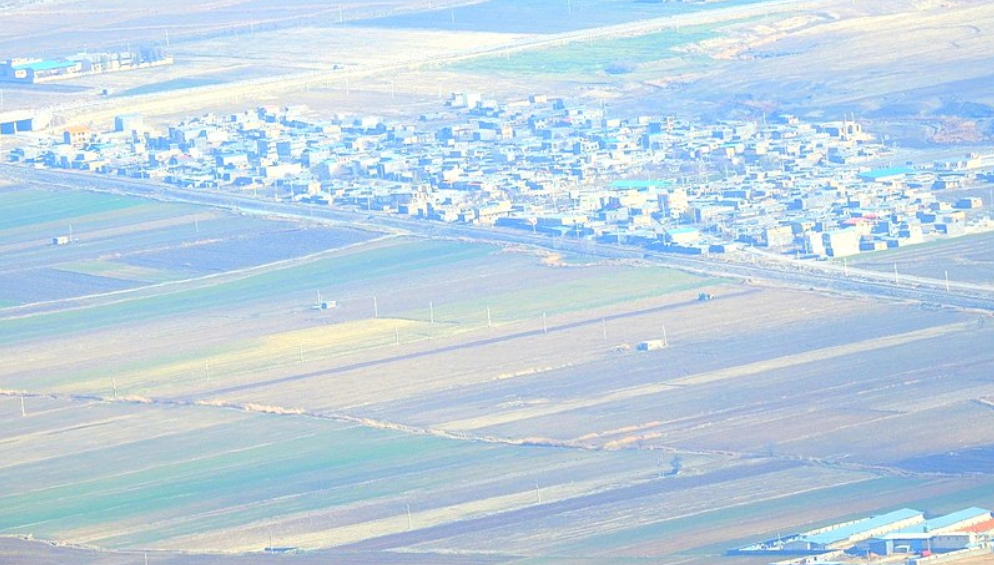
- The village of Gorji

- Location within Iran
- Coordinates: 33°26′17″N 49°26′03″E
- Country: Iran
- Province: Lorestan
- County: Azna
- District: Central
- Rural District: Pachehlak-e Gharbi

Population (2016)
  - Total: 2,971
- Time zone: UTC+3:30 (IRST)

Gorji (Persian: گرجي) (Note: Also romanized as Gorjī) is a village in Pachehlak-e Gharbi Rural District of the Central District in Azna County, Lorestan province, Iran.

== Demographics ==
=== Population ===
At the time of the 2006 National Census, the village's population was 1,980 in 431 households. The following census in 2011 counted 2,579 people in 684 households. The 2016 census measured the population of the village as 2,971 people in 810 households, the most populous in its rural district.

== Overview ==
The villagers date back to the Safavid period, when some of the Georgians of Qazvin (the capital of that period) were displaced and the name of the village is taken from them. These Georgians founded the villages of the Ten Azna, Karitlan and Burjeleh, Cheghazal and Cheghaghoni and Cheghasidee. The last two villages were destroyed in the 1281 solar year's earthquake.

Previously, the Gorji village was located near the Azna River, which was ruined by floods in the past, and its hard-working people re-established the Georgian village above the former village. Gorji has a fort in the north and near the white mountain that is known as the Georgian castle.
