= Marzian, Lorestan =

Village in Lorestan province, Iran

Marzian Persian: مرزيان
- Village
- Location within Iran
- Coordinates: 33°32′13″N 49°30′39″E
- Country: Iran
- Province: Lorestan
- County: Azna
- District: Japelaq
- Rural District: Japelaq-e Sharqi

Population (2016)
  - Total: 986
- Time zone: UTC+3:30 (IRST)

Marzian (Persian: مرزيان) (Note: Also romanized as Marzeyān, Marzīān, and Marzīyan) is a village in Japelaq-e Sharqi Rural District of Japelaq District in Azna County, Lorestan province, Iran.

== Demographics ==
=== Population ===
At the time of the 2006 National Census, the village's population was 738 in 178 households. The following census in 2011 counted 920 people in 249 households. The 2016 census measured the population of the village as 986 people in 274 households, the most populous in its rural district.
