= Darband, Lorestan =

Village in Lorestan province, Iran

Darband Persian: دربند
- Village
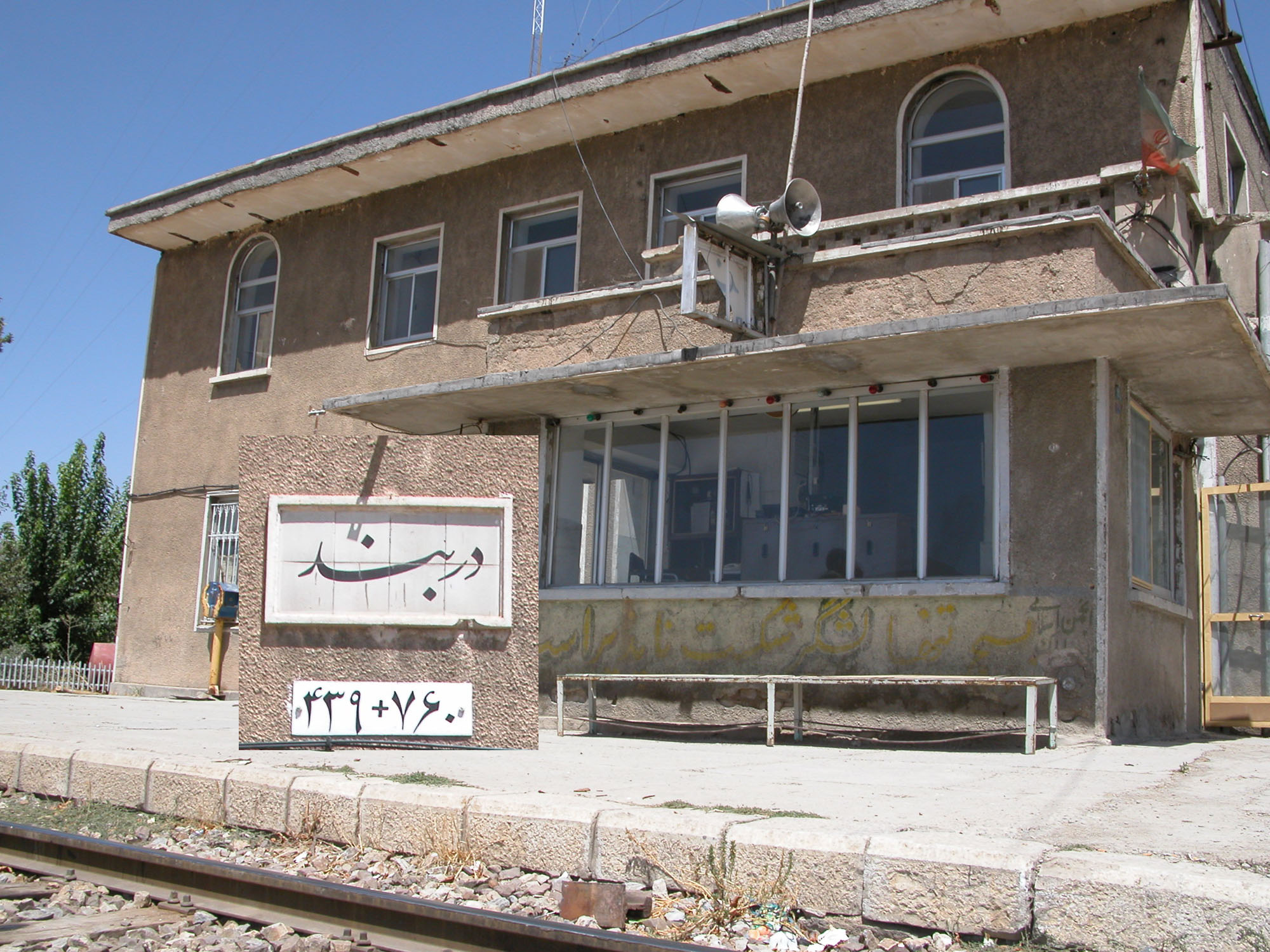
- Railway station at Darband

- Location within Iran
- Coordinates: 33°26′36″N 49°18′56″E
- Country: Iran
- Province: Lorestan
- County: Azna
- District: Central
- Rural District: Silakhor-e Sharqi

Population (2016)
  - Total: 1,903
- Time zone: UTC+3:30 (IRST)

Darband (Persian: دربند) is a village in, and the capital of, Silakhor-e Sharqi Rural District in the Central District of Azna County, Lorestan province, Iran.

== Demographics ==
=== Population ===
At the time of the 2006 National Census, the village's population was 2,037 in 467 households. The following census in 2011 counted 1,909 people in 519 households. The 2016 census measured the population of the village as 1,903 people in 600 households, the most populous in its rural district.
