= Bavaki =

Bavaki or Bauki or Bavki may refer to:

- Bavaki-ye Amir Bakhtiar, a village in Lorestan Province, Iran
- Bovaki, a village in Lorestan Province, Iran
- BAVAKI, a house/ techno dj from the Netherlands
