= Geligerd =

Village in Lorestan province, Iran

Geligerd Persian: گليگرد
- Village
- Location within Iran
- Coordinates: 33°36′58″N 49°36′57″E
- Country: Iran
- Province: Lorestan
- County: Azna
- District: Japelaq
- Rural District: Japelaq-e Sharqi

Population (2016)
  - Total: 462
- Time zone: UTC+3:30 (IRST)

Geligerd (Persian: گليگرد) (Note: Also romanized as Gelīgerd; also known as Gelījerd, Gol Gerd, Golī Jerd, Golicherd, and Jīlkerd) is a village in Japelaq-e Sharqi Rural District of Japelaq District in Azna County, Lorestan province, Iran.

== Demographics ==
=== Population ===
At the time of the 2006 National Census, the village's population was 613 in 159 households. The following census in 2011 counted 637 people in 197 households. The 2016 census measured the population of the village as 462 people in 151 households.
