= Madabad =

Madabad (Persian: ماداباد or مداباد) may refer to:

- Madabad, Hamadan (ماداباد - Mādābād)
- Madabad, Lorestan (مداباد - Madābād)
- Madabad, Khodabandeh, Zanjan Province (ماداباد - Mādābād)
- Madabad, Mahneshan, Zanjan Province (ماداباد - Mādābād)
