= Zanganeh Ganjeh =

Village in Lorestan province, Iran

Zanganeh Ganjeh Persian: زنگنه گنجه
- Village
- Location within Iran
- Coordinates: 33°38′09″N 49°30′06″E
- Country: Iran
- Province: Lorestan
- County: Azna
- District: Japelaq
- Rural District: Japelaq-e Sharqi

Population (2016)
  - Total: 418
- Time zone: UTC+3:30 (IRST)

Zanganeh Ganjeh (Persian: زنگنه گنجه) is a village in Japelaq-e Sharqi Rural District of Japelaq District in Azna County, Lorestan province, Iran.

== Demographics ==
=== Population ===
At the time of the 2006 National Census, the village's population was 502 in 119 households. The following census in 2011 counted 508 people in 149 households. The 2016 census measured the population of the village as 418 people in 131 households.
