= Shater =

Shater may refer to:

- Shater, Lorestan, Iran
- Shater, West Azerbaijan, Iran
- Al-Shater Bossely Abdul Jalil (1901–1977), Egyptian historian and anthropologist
