= Kahriz, Azna =

Village in Lorestan province, Iran

Kahriz Persian: كهريز
- Village
- Location within Iran
- Coordinates: 33°36′06″N 49°19′53″E
- Country: Iran
- Province: Lorestan
- County: Azna
- District: Japelaq
- Rural District: Japelaq-e Gharbi

Population (2016)
  - Total: 237
- Time zone: UTC+3:30 (IRST)

Kahriz (Persian: كهريز) (Note: Also romanized as Kahrīz; also known as Kahrīz-e Safīd and Kārīz) is a village in Japelaq-e Gharbi Rural District of Japelaq District in Azna County in Lorestan province, Iran.

== Demographics ==
=== Population ===
At the time of the 2006 National Census, the village's population was 361 in 89 households. The following census in 2011 counted 308 people in 93 households. The 2016 census measured the population of the village as 237 people in 91 households.
