= Bagh-e Nuri =

Bagh-e Nuri (Persian: باغنوري) may refer to:

- Bagh-e Nuri, Kerman
- Bagh-e Nuri, Lorestan
