= Siavashabad =

Village in Lorestan province, Iran

Siavashabad Persian: سياوش‌آباد
- Village
- Location within Iran
- Coordinates: 33°21′47″N 49°24′17″E
- Country: Iran
- Province: Lorestan
- County: Azna
- District: Central
- Rural District: Pachehlak-e Gharbi

Population (2016)
  - Total: 481
- Time zone: UTC+3:30 (IRST)

Siavashabad (Persian: سياوش‌آباد) (Note: Also romanized as Seyāvashābād, Sīāvashābād, and Sīāvoshābād; also known as Sīāvosh) is a village in Pachehlak-e Gharbi Rural District of the Central District in Azna County, Lorestan province, Iran.

== Demographics ==
=== Population ===
At the time of the 2006 National Census, the village's population was 477 in 92 households. The following census in 2011 counted 406 people in 107 households. The 2016 census measured the population of the village as 481 people in 131 households.
