= Shater, Lorestan =

Shater شاطر
- Village
- Location within Iran
- Coordinates: 33°36′09″N 49°29′02″E
- Country: Iran
- Province: Lorestan
- County: Azna
- Bakhsh: Japelaq
- Rural District: Japelaq-e Sharqi

Population (2006)
  - Total: 131
- Time zone: UTC+3:30 (IRST)
  - Summer (DST): UTC+4:30 (IRDT)

Shater (Persian: شاطر, also Romanized as Shāţer and Shāţir) is a village in Japelaq-e Sharqi Rural District, Japelaq District, Azna County, Lorestan Province, Iran. At the 2006 census, its population was 131, in 31 families.
