= Kamandan, Lorestan =

Village in Lorestan province, Iran

Kamandan Persian: كمندان
- Village
- Location within Iran
- Coordinates: 33°18′30″N 49°26′36″E
- Country: Iran
- Province: Lorestan
- County: Azna
- District: Central
- Rural District: Pachehlak-e Gharbi

Population (2016)
  - Total: 681
- Time zone: UTC+3:30 (IRST)

Kamandan (Persian: كمندان) (Note: Also romanized as Kamandān) is a village in Pachehlak-e Gharbi Rural District of the Central District in Azna County, Lorestan province, Iran.

== Demographics ==
=== Population ===
At the time of the 2006 National Census, the village's population was 729 in 136 households. The following census in 2011 counted 697 people in 187 households. The 2016 census measured the population of the village as 681 people in 200 households.
