= Shurcheh =

Shurcheh (Persian: شورچه) may refer to:

- Shurcheh, Fars
- Shurcheh, Borkhar, Isfahan Province
- Shurcheh, Golpayegan, Isfahan Province
- Shurcheh, Lenjan, Isfahan Province
- Shurcheh, Kermanshah
- Shurcheh, Lorestan
- Shurcheh, Razavi Khorasan
- Shurcheh-ye Purgazy, Khash County, Sistan and Baluchestan Province
