= Ashurabad =

Ashurabad (Persian: اشوراباد or عاشوراباد) may refer to:

- Ashurabad, Gilan (عاشوراباد - ‘Āshūrābād)
- Ashurabad, Golestan (اشوراباد - Āshūrābād)
- Ashurabad, Lorestan (اشوراباد - Āshūrābād)
