= Mian Rudan (disambiguation) =

Mian Rudan is the alternate name of Mianrud, a city in Khuzestan Province, Iran.

Mian Rudan or Meyan Rudan (Persian: ميان رودان) may also refer to:

- Mian Rudan, Ardabil
- Mian Rudan, Chaharmahal and Bakhtiari
- Mian Rudan, Lorestan
- Mian Rudan, Markazi
