= Farzian =

Village in Lorestan province, Iran

Farzian Persian: فرزيان
- Village
- Location within Iran
- Coordinates: 33°33′33″N 49°33′19″E
- Country: Iran
- Province: Lorestan
- County: Azna
- District: Japelaq
- Rural District: Japelaq-e Sharqi

Population (2016)
  - Total: 630
- Time zone: UTC+3:30 (IRST)

Farzian (Persian: فرزيان) (Note: Also romanized as Farzeyān, Farzīān, and Farzīyan; also known as Fārisiyān and Fārsīān) is a village in Japelaq-e Sharqi Rural District of Japelaq District in Azna County, Lorestan province, Iran.

== History ==
The site now occupied by Farzian is believed to have been the site of the city of Gabai (گابایی). The fact that this city shared its name with another in Sogdia serves as evidence for the migration of Aryans into Iran from the Central Asians Plains.

From the 12th to the 16th centuries AD, the most significant site in the Japelaq region was Farzian Castle, a stronghold built by Al-Ajl which often served as a refuge for rebels.

Until the 1970s, Farzian was a popular destination for tourists on account of its beautiful pine groves, vineyards and gardens. However, these were destroyed in droughts following the construction of dams.

== Demographics ==
=== Language ===
All Farzian residents speak the Luri language, and are Twelver Shiites.

=== Population ===
The 2006 National Census recorded a population of 1,025 people in 299 households, including 485 men and 540 women. Roughly 66% of the men and 57% of the women were literate. The following census in 2011 counted 872 people in 261 households. The 2016 census measured the population of the village as 630 people in 219 households.

== Geography ==
Farzian village is 0.7 by 0.5km, with an area of 0.35km. It is 32km northeast of the Oshtrankooh mountain range. The village is crossed by the dry beds of two former rivers - the Godara from northwest, and the Jopileh from southwest.

Farzian has a cold mountainous climate. The average temperature in July (the hottest month of the year) is 25 degrees Celsius, in December (the coldest month of the year) is -3 degrees Celsius, in April it is 12 degrees Celsius and in October it is 15 degrees Celsius. The average annual temperature is 12 degrees Celsius and the annual rainfall is 456.2 mm.
