= Soruri Kashani =

- Born: 16th-century Kashan, Safavid Iran
- Died: after 1626
- Occupations: Poet and lexicographer
- Writing career
- Language: Persian
- Notable works: Farhang-e Soruri; Kholasat al-Majma

Soruri Kashani (Persian: سروری کاشانی: died after 1626) was a poet and lexicographer in 16th and 17th century Safavid Iran, who composed the Persian dictionary Farhang-e Soruri.

Soruri was a native of Kashan. His father Hajji Mohammad was reportedly a shoemaker, which Soruri also worked as early in his career before switching to book learning. Soruri was said to have memorized 30,000 verses due to his strong memory. In 1599/1600, he completed his Farhang-e Soruri, dedicating it to Shah Abbas I (r. 1587–1629). He also composed a shortened version of the dictionary, known as the Kholasat al-Majma, whose opening included the approval of Shah Abbas I's grand vizier Hatem Beg Ordubadi. The index of the Sepahsalar Library mentions a copy of the work in a private collection with the year 1609/10, which indicates that was the latest date of its composition.

After becoming familiar with the Farhang-i Jahangiri by 1618, Soruri created a second edition of his Farhang-e Soruri, significantly increasing its list of words and including a second opening. Soruri moved to Isfahan, where he encountered the Italian traveller Pietro Della Valle in November 1622. In 1622/23, Soruri moved to Lahore in the Mughal Empire. After 1626, he undertook a pilgrimage to Mecca but died on the way.

Some of Soruri's verses have survived in the Tazkera-ye Taher-e Nasrabadi by Mirza Mohammad Taher Nasrabadi.

== Sources ==
- Bayevsky, S. (2020). "Farhang-e Sorūrī". In Yarshater, Ehsan (ed.). Encyclopædia Iranica (Online ed.). Brill. doi:10.1163/2330-4804_EIRO_COM_9555.
- Rahman, Munibur (1997). "Surūrī Kās̲h̲ānī". In Bosworth, C. E.; van Donzel, E.; Heinrichs, W. P. & Lecomte, G. (eds.). The Encyclopaedia of Islam, Second Edition. Volume IX: San–Sze. Leiden: E. J. Brill. ISBN 978-90-04-10422-8.
