= Farhang-i Rashidi =

17th-century Persian dictionary from Mughal India

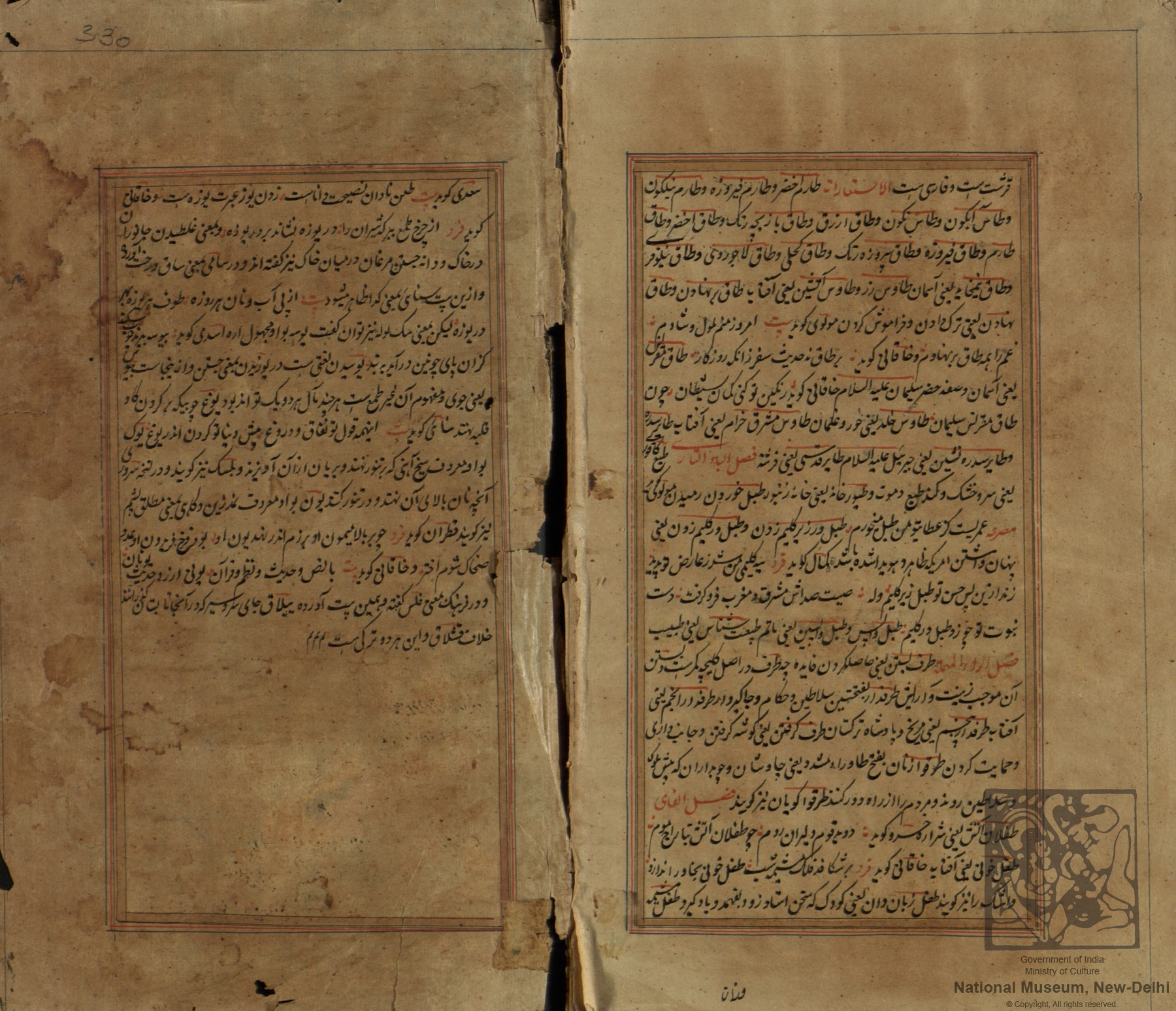
Folio from a manuscript of the Farhang-i Rashidi kept in the National Museum of Delhi

The Farhang-i Rashidi (Persian: فرهنگ رشىدى, lit. 'The dictionary of bravery/of Rashīd') is a Persian dictionary compiled in 17th-century Mughal India by scholar Abd-al-Rashid Thattawi, in the city of Thatta. The dictionary is one of the major contributions to Persian lexicography from the Mughal era, and is the first critical dictionary of the Persian language. It is cited as a source in several subsequent Persian dictionaries and was used by European Persianists in their study of the language. Unlike other dictionaries of its time, the Farhang-i Rashidi has no dedication, and scholars disagree on whether it was the result of imperial patronage.

== Writing ==
The Farhang-i Rashidi was written by Abd-al-Rashid binʿAbd-al-Ghafur Ḥusayni Thattawi, a poet and scholar with two other lexicographical writings to his name. The author introduces himself in the Farhang as having been born in Thatta, Sindh, with his family originating from Medina, and claims descent from Imam Husayn; not much else is known of his life. In the preface to the work, the author states that the purpose of the dictionary was to correct errors and fill gaps introduced by two major dictionaries of the time, the Farhang-i Jahangiri and the Majma al-Furs. The author acknowledges these as the best Persian dictionaries in existence, but is critical of these dictionaries' repetitions of words and verses, the inclusion of Arabic and Turkish-origin words without acknowledgment of their foreignness, and the incorrect usage of i'rab (diacritics) in several entries. For this reason, Farhang-i Rashidi is considered to be an abridgment of the Farhang-i Jahangiri and Majma al-Furs. The dictionary's refutal and improvement of previous works makes it the first critical Persian dictionary. The Farhang-i Rashidi also uses several medieval Persian dictionaries as sources.

The dictionary was compiled around 1653/1654 in Thatta. In the view of historian Muzaffar Alam, the dictionary was part of a trend of attempts to 'purify' the Persian language in Mughal India by aligning it closer to its Iranian roots. The dictionary's completion followed that of the Burhan-i Qati, another major Indo-Persian dictionary compiled in the Deccan, by two years. Unlike other dictionaries of its time, the Farhang-i Rashidi is not dedicated to any individual. Orientalist scholars Charles Ambrose Storey and Heinrich Blochmann agreed that the dictionary was dedicated to Mughal emperor Shah Jahan; Blochmann explained the lack of dedication in the text by asserting that the work was only completed when Shah Jahan had been imprisoned by his successor Aurangzeb, whom Abd-al-Rashid did not approve of. However, scholar Arthur Dudney refutes this explanation, pointing out that Shah Jahan was still in power around 1653 and was only imprisoned in 1658. The Farhang-i Rashidi is also set apart from contemporary dictionaries in that it originated from the Sindh region rather than in any Mughal imperial centre.

== Content ==
The Farhang-i Rashidi is a monolingual Persian dictionary. It is structured into a moqaddema (introduction), followed by twenty-four bab (chapters). The preface of the book indicates that the book also has a khatima (conclusion) but this never appears. The introduction is a notable work in itself; it is a discussion of the vocabulary and grammar of the Persian language and represents one of the earliest academic attempts to describe Persian grammar. The dictionary contains 8,000-9,000 entries arranged alphabetically by the first letter of the word, and every word sharing the same first letter is grouped into one chapter. Chapters are subdivided into fasl (sections) that further group words by shared second letter. Many of these sections also have isti'arat (metaphors) appear at their end. Each word has a pronunciation provided using the constituent vowels, and Indian equivalents are listed for some words.

== Legacy ==
The Farhang-i Rashidi enjoyed widespread popularity after its publication owing to its completeness and critical treatment of previous dictionaries. Scholar Jan Rypka called it one of the three most important dictionaries produced in Mughal India. It was one of the dictionaries that provided the basis for eighteenth-century Persian lexicography, and was cited as a source in subsequent Persian dictionaries Siraj-al-Lughat (1734–35), Bahar-i Ajam (1749), and Ḡīāṯ al-loḡā (1826–27). In the Siraj-al-Lughat, the author Siraj-ud-Din Ali Khan Arzu praises the Farhang-i Rashidi for its use of quotations, but one of the purposes of his own dictionary was to fix shortcomings in the latter. The Farhang-i Rashidi later influenced the European study of the Persian language; it is used as a source by Johann Vullers in his 1864 Persian-Latin dictionary, and Francis Joseph Steingass in his 1892 Persian-English dictionary. The Farhang-i Jahangiri was published in 1872 by the Asiatic Society in Calcutta.

The introduction portion of the Farhang-i Rashidi was used as the basis for a work on Persian grammar titled Resāla-ye 'Abd-al-Wāse, authored by Abd-al-Rashid's contemporary Abd-al-Wāseʿ Hānsawī - this work was a widely used primer of the eighteenth century. The introduction was also published separately as Grammaticae Persicae praecepta ac regula in 1864.
