= Bagh Muri =

Village in Lorestan province, Iran

Bagh Muri Persian: باغ موري
- Village
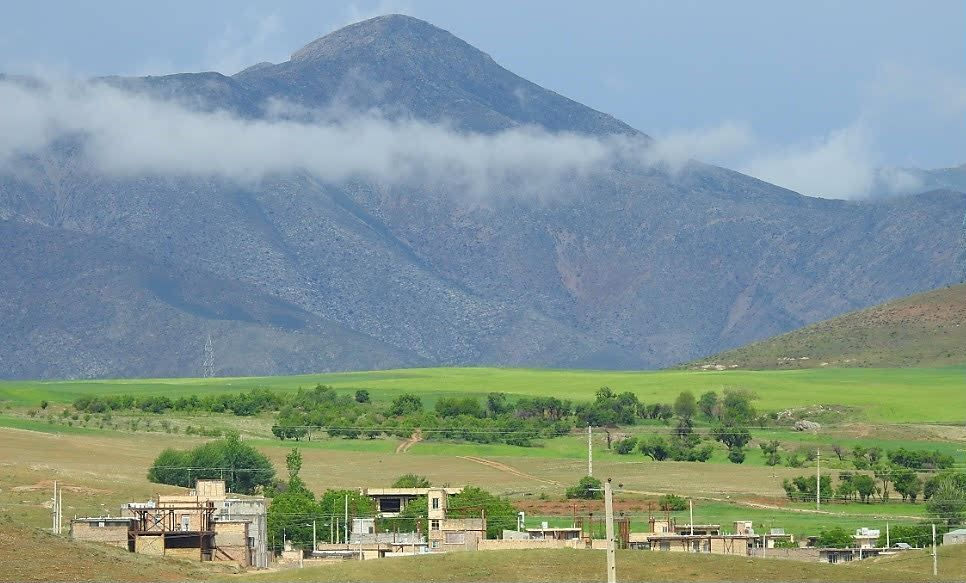
- The village of Bagh Muri

- Location within Iran
- Coordinates: 33°29′33″N 49°25′42″E
- Country: Iran
- Province: Lorestan
- County: Azna
- District: Central
- Rural District: Pachehlak-e Gharbi

Population (2016)
  - Total: 982
- Time zone: UTC+3:30 (IRST)

Bagh Muri (Persian: باغ موري) (Note: Also romanized as Bāgh Mūrī Bāgh-e Mūrī, and Bāgh-i-Mūrī; also known as Bāgh-e Nūrī) is a village in Pachehlak-e Gharbi Rural District of the Central District in Azna County, Lorestan province, Iran.

== Demographics ==
=== Population ===
At the time of the 2006 National Census, the village's population was 724 in 167 households. The following census in 2011 counted 833 people in 225 households. The 2016 census measured the population of the village as 982 people in 274 households.
