= Hosh =

Hosh may refer to several places:

- Hosh Bannaga, a town in Sudan
- Hosh Essa, a city in Egypt
- Hosh, Perth and Kinross, a place in Perth and Kinross, Scotland
- Hush, Lorestan, a village in Iran

It may also refer to:

- Hosh (architecture)

== See also ==
- HOSH, German DJ
- Maarat Umm Hawsh
