= Ashurabad, Lorestan =

Village in Lorestan province, Iran

Ashurabad Persian: اشوراباد
- Village
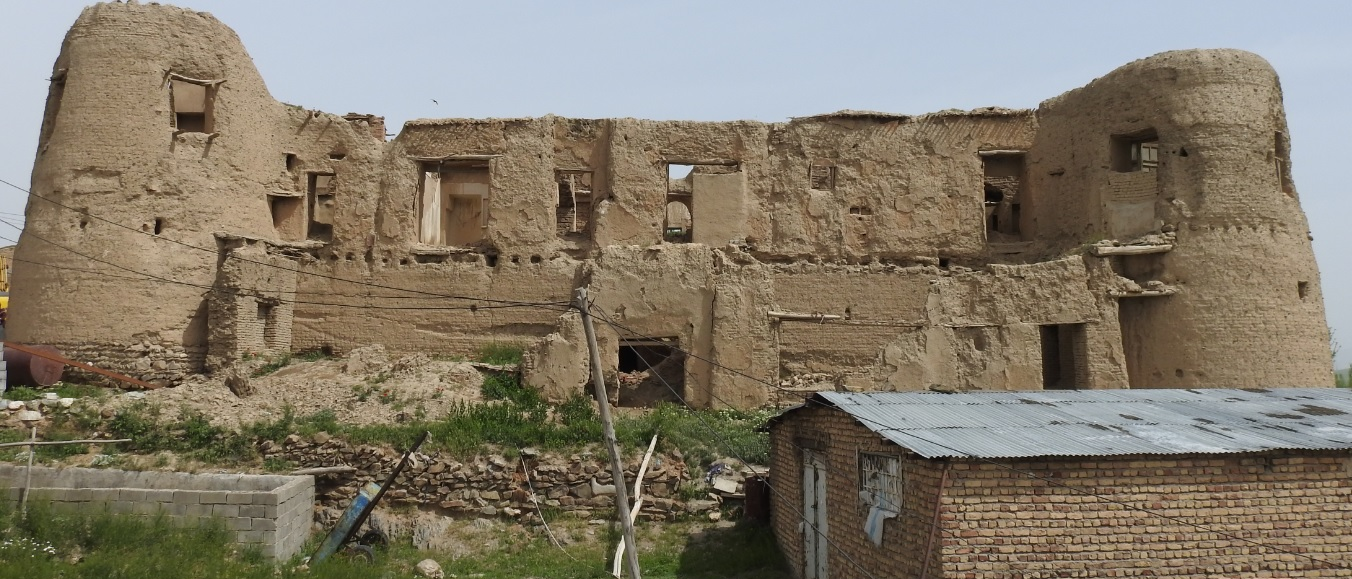
- Ashurabad castle in 2017

- Location within Iran
- Coordinates: 33°38′36″N 49°24′30″E
- Country: Iran
- Province: Lorestan
- County: Azna
- District: Japelaq
- Rural District: Japelaq-e Gharbi

Population (2016)
  - Total: 801
- Time zone: UTC+3:30 (IRST)

Ashurabad (Persian: اشوراباد) (Note: Also romanized as Āshūrābād; also known as ‘Ashīrābād and Ashorabād) is a village in, and the capital of, Japelaq-e Gharbi Rural District in Japelaq District of Azna County, Lorestan province, Iran.

== Demographics ==
=== Population ===
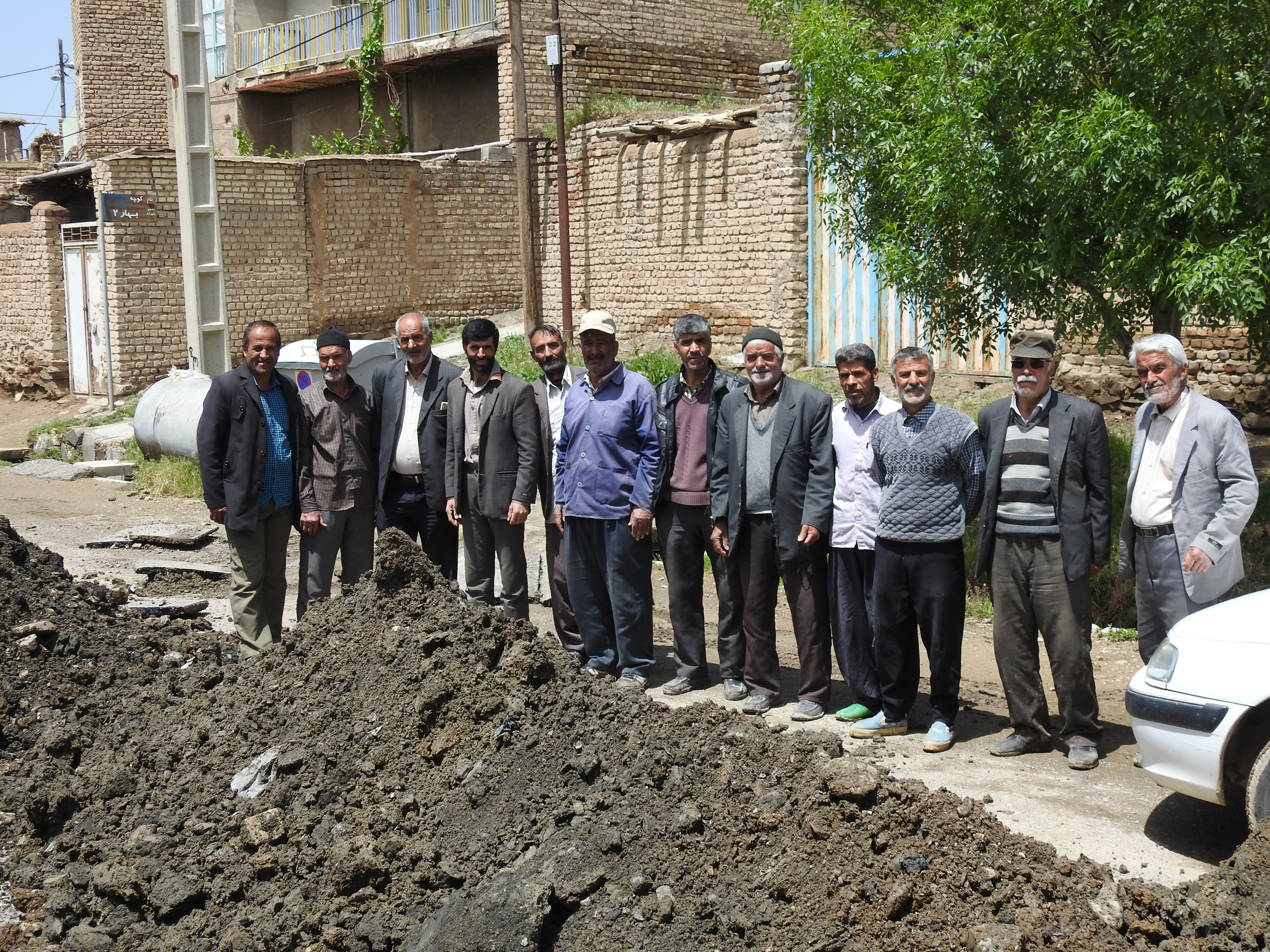
Ashurabad people, 2017

At the time of the 2006 National Census, the village's population was 881 in 220 households. The following census in 2011 counted 732 people in 233 households. The 2016 census measured the population of the village as 801 people in 275 households, the most populous in its rural district.
