= Kamari, Iran =

Kamari or Kamri (Persian: كمري) may refer to:

- Kamari, Hamadan
- Kamari, Lorestan
