= Modabad =

Village in Lorestan province, Iran

Modabad Persian: مداباد
- Village
- Location within Iran
- Coordinates: 33°35′54″N 49°33′39″E
- Country: Iran
- Province: Lorestan
- County: Azna
- District: Japelaq
- Rural District: Japelaq-e Sharqi

Population (2016)
  - Total: 576
- Time zone: UTC+3:30 (IRST)

Modabad (Persian: مداباد) (Note: Also romanized as Madābād and Modābād; also known as Ḩamedābād, Hamūdābād, and Mudābād) is a village in Japelaq-e Sharqi Rural District of Japelaq District in Azna County, Lorestan province, Iran.

== Demographics ==
=== Population ===
At the time of the 2006 National Census, the village's population was 811 in 215 households. The following census in 2011 counted 611 people in 180 households. The 2016 census measured the population of the village as 576 people in 185 households.
