= Bavaki-ye Amir Bakhtiar =

Bavaki-ye Amir Bakhtiar باوكي اميربختيار
- Village
- Location within Iran
- Coordinates: 33°33′25″N 49°19′11″E
- Country: Iran
- Province: Lorestan
- County: Azna
- Bakhsh: Central
- Rural District: Silakhor-e Sharqi

Population (2006)
  - Total: 350
- Time zone: UTC+3:30 (IRST)
  - Summer (DST): UTC+4:30 (IRDT)

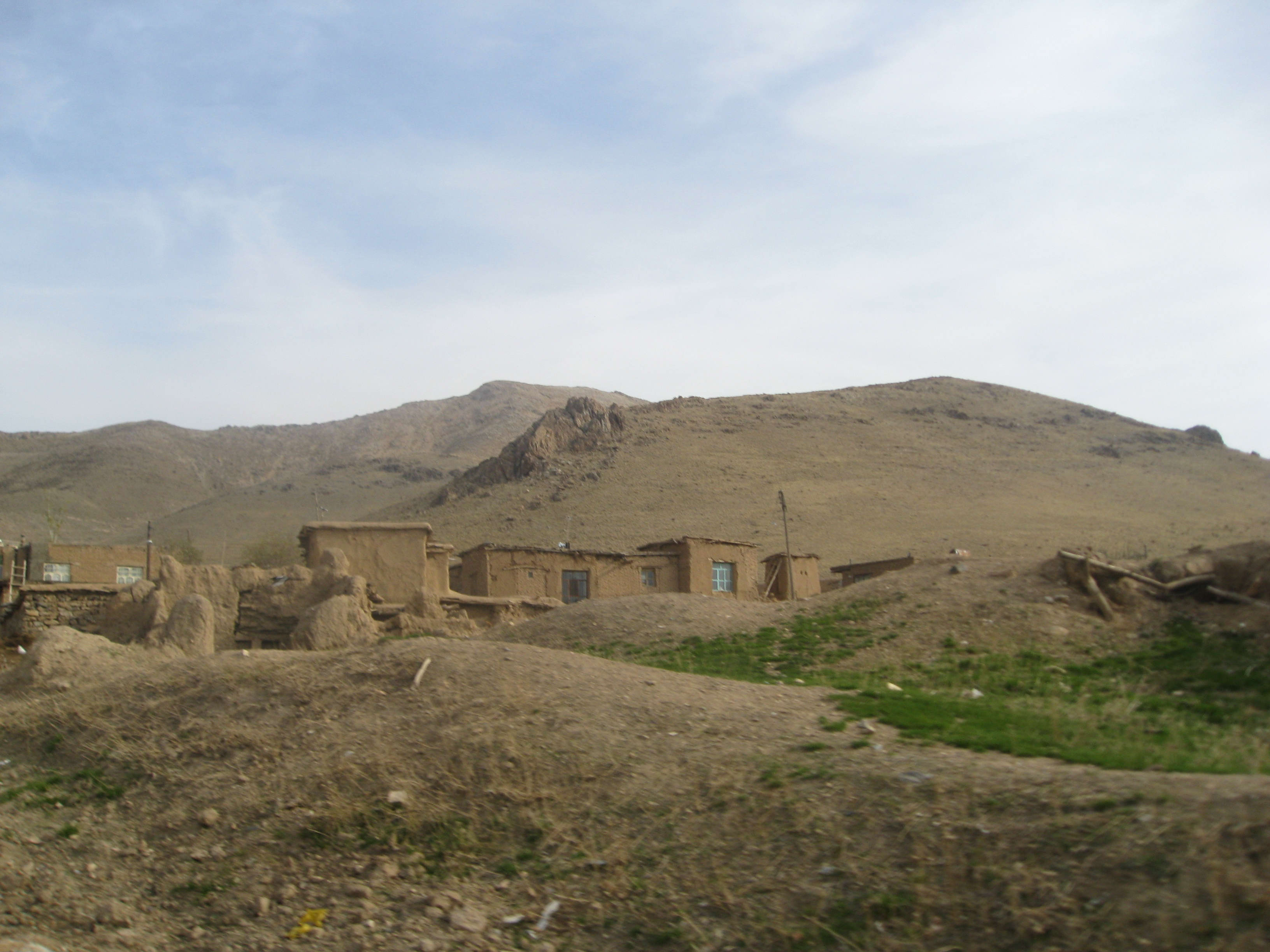
روستای باوکی امیر بختیار پاییز 1387

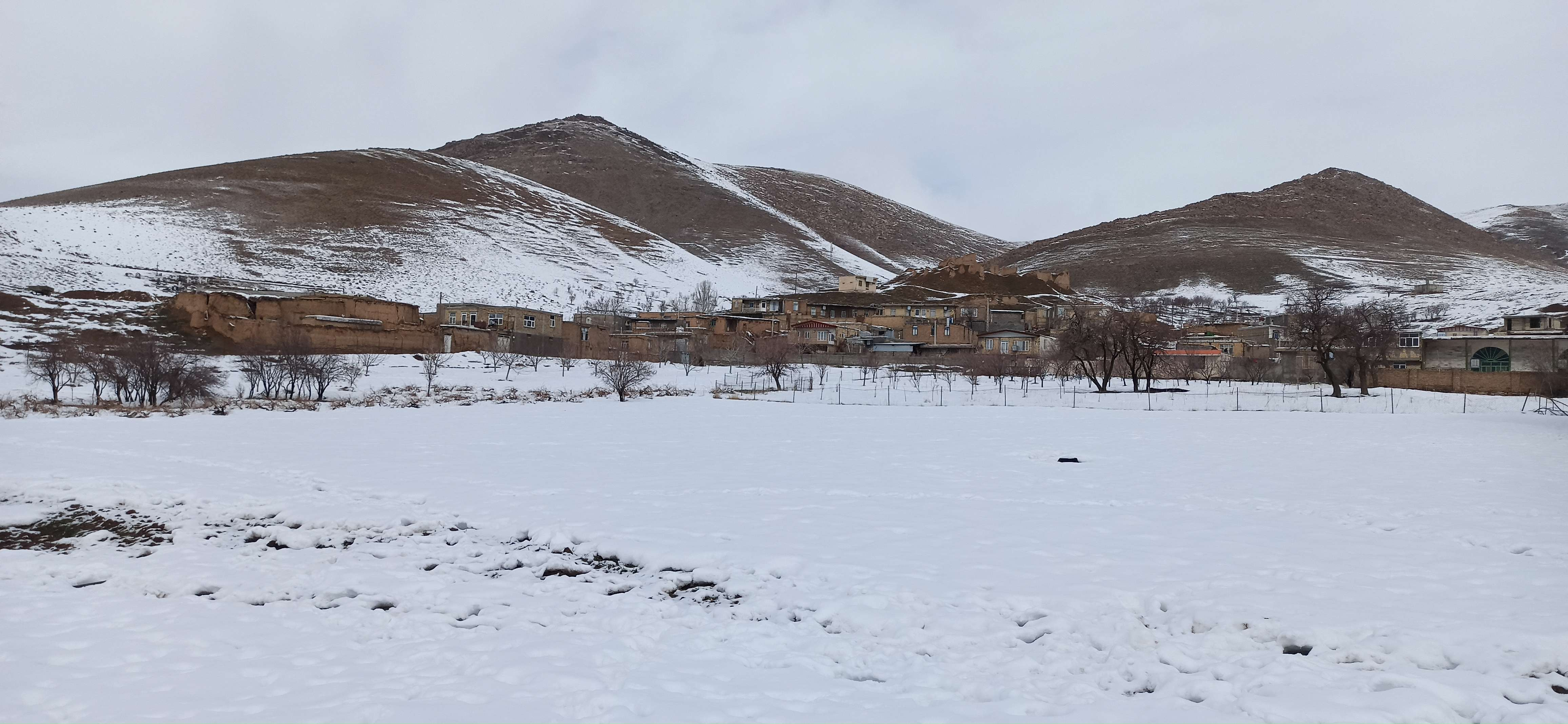
زمستان برفی 1401

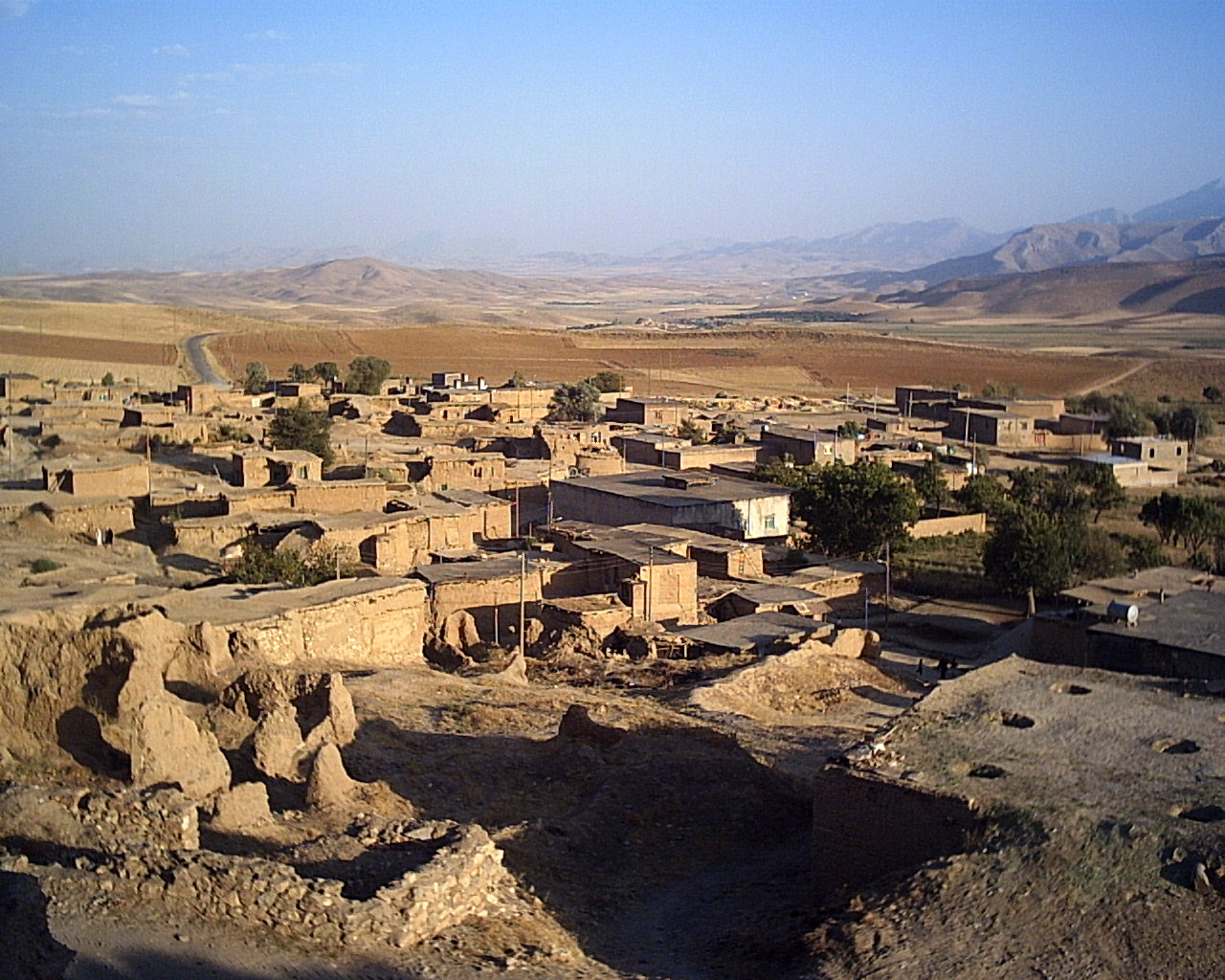

Bavaki-ye Amir Bakhtiar (Persian: باوكي اميربختيار, also Romanized as Bāvakī-ye Amīr Bakhtīār and Bāvekī-ye Amīr Bakhtīār; also known as Bāvekī, Bāvokī, Bābki, Bārkī, and Bauki) is a village in Silakhor-e Sharqi Rural District, in the Central District of Azna County, Lorestan province, Iran. At the 2006 census, its population was 350, in 79 families.
