= Delyan =

Delyan may refer to:

== People ==
- Petar Delyan (reigned 1040–1041), leader of a major Bulgarian uprising against Byzantine rule
- Delyan Dobrev, Bulgarian politician
- Delyan Peevski, Bulgarian politician and oligarch

== Places ==
- Delyan Point, South Shetland Islands, Antarctica

=== Bulgaria ===
- Delyan, Kyustendil Province
- Delyan, Sofia Province

=== Other ===
- Delyan, Iran
