= Suzani =

Suzani may refer to:

- Suzani (textile), an embroidered tribal textile made in Central Asia
- Suzani Samarqandi, 12th-century Persian poet
