= Tombak (disambiguation) =

Tombak is an Iranian goblet drum.

Tombak may also refer to:

- Tombac or tombak, a brass alloy with high copper content and 5–20% zinc content
- Tombak, Iran, a village in Pachehlak-e Gharbi Rural District
- Tombak Rural District, Bushehr province, Iran
- KRI Tombak, a warship of the Indonesian Navy
- Ertan Tombak (born 1999), Bulgarian footballer
- Janek Tombak (born 1976), Estonian cyclist
