= Babki =

Babki may refer to:

- Babki, alternate name of Bavaki-ye Amir Bakhtiar, Iran
- Babki, Greater Poland Voivodeship, Poland
- Babki, Warmian-Masurian Voivodeship, Poland
