= Burhan-i Qati =

Persian dictionary produced in India

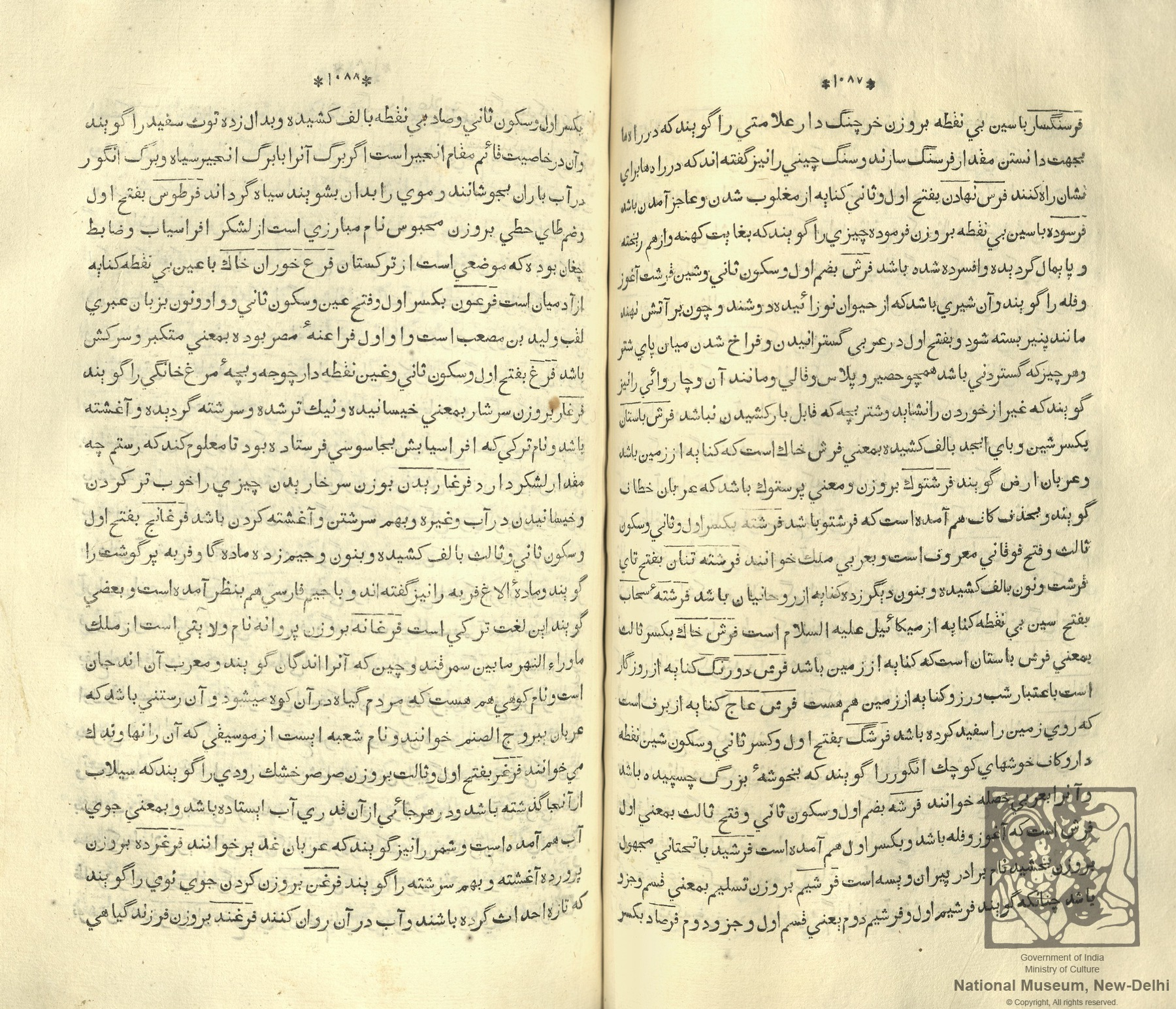
Pages from a text of the Burhan-i Qati published in Calcutta, written in naskh calligraphy. National Museum, New Delhi

The Burhan-i Qati (Persian: برهان قاطع, lit. '[The] Conclusive Proof') is a Persian dictionary compiled during the 17th century by Muhammad Husayn bin Khalaf Tabrizi. Produced in the Indian city of Hyderabad and dedicated to the seventh Qutb Shahi sultan Abdullah Qutb Shah, the dictionary was popular in the Indian subcontinent and beyond. It also received criticism and was a source of controversy among writers and linguists.

== Writing ==
Muhammad Husayn bin Khalaf Tabrizi (who used the pen-name Burhan) was a scholar of obscure origins. He may have immigrated to India from Tabriz, but it is also possible that he inherited his nisba from ancestors of his who had migrated from Tabriz to India in the past. He settled in the Deccan region of the Indian subcontinent and served in the court of Abdullah Qutb Shah for some time. Muhammad Husayn completed his dictionary in 1651–1652.

== Content ==
The Burhan-i Qati contains approximately 20,211 entries, with the number varying across editions. The dictionary consists of a nine-part introduction and a twenty-nine-chapter main text. The main text is arranged in alphabetical order, unlike many of the dictionary's predecessors. Muhammad Husayn cites four dictionaries as sources for the Burhan-i Qati, namely: the Farhang-i Jahangiri, the Majma al-Furs, the Surma-yi Sulaymani, and the Sihah al-adwiya, though the content of the dictionary indicates that the author used more sources than these.

Around half of the entries in the Burhan-i Qati are accompanied by pronunciation guides for the defined word. The dictionary notably contains many non-Persian words from several Iranian languages such as Avestan, Khwarezmian, Sogdian, Sistani, Gilaki, and Tabari. Words from other languages like Hebrew, Syriac, Turkish, Greek, Latin, and vernacular Indian languages, especially Dakani, also appear.

== Legacy ==
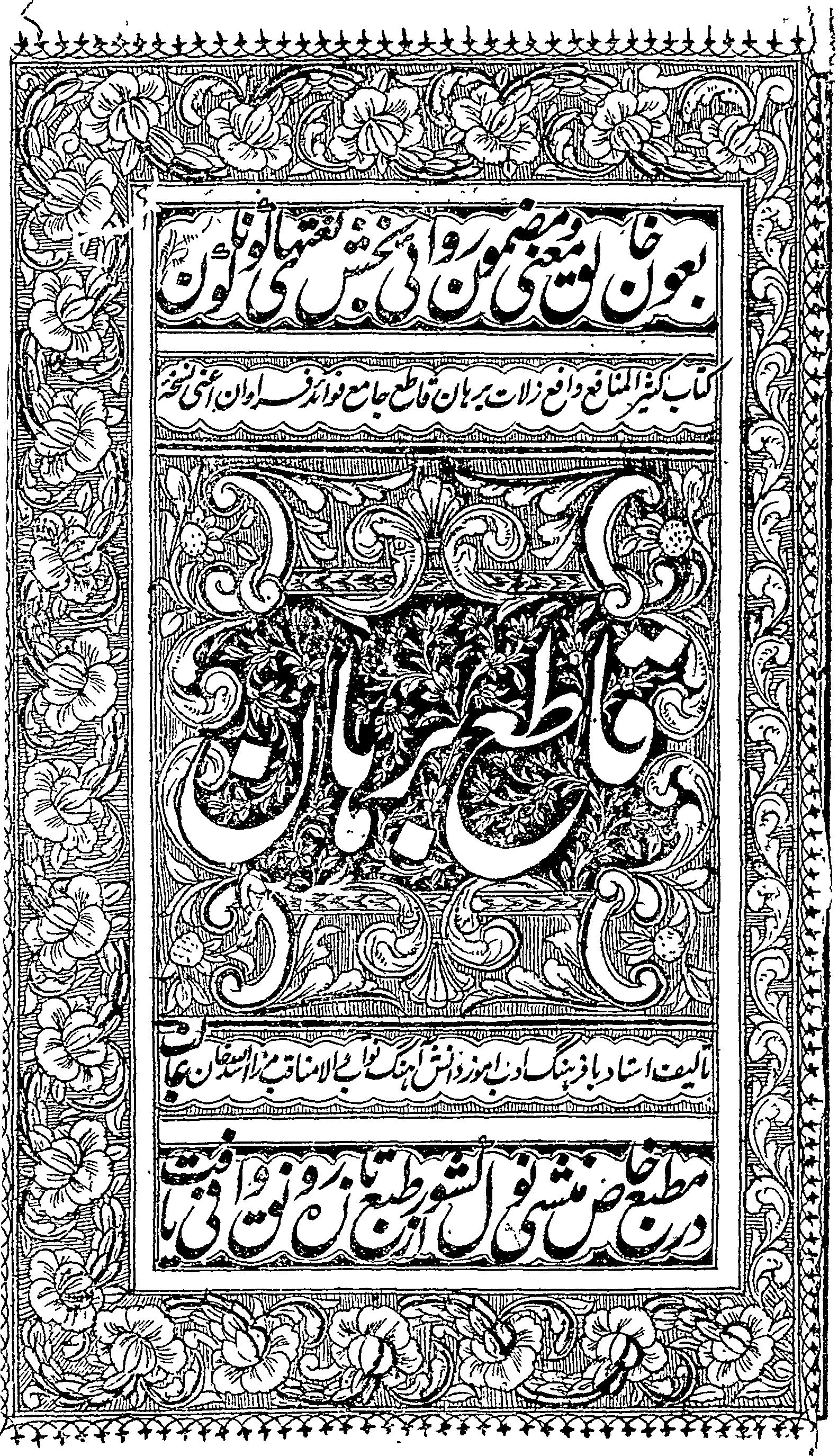
Cover page of Ghalib's Qati-i Burhan, a criticism of the Burhan-i Qati

The Burhan-i Qati became very famous following its completion due to its wide range of words and compounds, the convenience of its alphabetical ordering, and its collation of the material in other dictionaries. It was frequently reproduced in India and Iran, and further spread by the advent of printing technology. The dictionary was used as a reference by writers and linguists more than any other Persian dictionary, and was consulted in the production of subsequent dictionaries Farhang-i anjuman aray-i Nasiri, Farhang-i Anand Raj, and Farhang-i Nafisi. The Burhan-i Qati was also used in the compilation of several Persian dictionaries in other languages.

The dictionary received criticism for containing etymological, historical, and geographical errors, and for including words not actually in use in Persian. This led to many writers using false words in their work and adopting spurious names. Such errors were noticed a century later by Siraj-ud-Din Ali Khan Arzu and corrected in his own dictionary. Towards the end of his life, famed poet Mirza Ghalib wrote a criticism of the Burhan-i Qati, titled 'Qati-i Burhan', which initiated a storm of controversy. Several responses arose both for and against the dictionary.
