= Momenabad =

City in Lorestan province, Iran

Momenabad Persian: مؤمن‌آباد
- City
- Location within Iran
- Coordinates: 33°35′35″N 49°31′26″E
- Country: Iran
- Province: Lorestan
- County: Azna
- District: Japelaq
- Established as a city: 1999

Population (2016)
  - Total: 1,821
- Time zone: UTC+3:30 (IRST)

Momenabad (Persian: مؤمن‌آباد) (Note: Also romanized as Mo’menābād; also known locally as Mamun (مأمون); formerly known as Mamuran (مأموران)) is a city in, and the capital of, Japelaq District in Azna County, Lorestan province, Iran. It also serves as the administrative center for Japelaq-e Sharqi Rural District. The village of Momenabad was converted to a city in 1999.

== Demographics ==
=== Population ===
At the time of the 2006 National Census, the city's population was 1,230 in 326 households. The following census in 2011 counted 1,561 people in 466 households. The 2016 census measured the population of the city as 1,821 people in 550 households.
