= Ab Taruiyeh =

Ab Taruiyeh اب تروئييه
- Village
- Location in Iran
- Coordinates: 30°36′N 54°54′E
- Country: Iran
- Province: Kerman
- County: Shahr-e Babak
- Bakhsh: Dehaj
- Rural District: Dehaj

Population (2006)
  - Total: 25
- Time zone: UTC+3:30 (IRST)
  - Summer (DST): UTC+4:30 (IRDT)

Ab Taruiyeh (Persian: اب تروئييه, also Romanized as Āb Tarū’īyeh; also known as Bāgh-e Nūrī-ye 'Olyā (Persian: باغنوري عليا)) is a village in Dehaj Rural District, Dehaj District, Shahr-e Babak County, Kerman province, Iran. At the 2006 census, its population was 25, in 5 families.
