= Hashvid, Dorud =

Hashvid حشويد
- Village
- Location within Iran
- Coordinates: 33°39′14″N 48°51′17″E
- Country: Iran
- Province: Lorestan
- County: Dorud
- Bakhsh: Silakhor
- Rural District: Chalanchulan

Population (2006)
  - Total: 210
- Time zone: UTC+3:30 (IRST)
  - Summer (DST): UTC+4:30 (IRDT)

Hashvid (Persian: حشويد, also Romanized as Ḩashvīd, Khashvīd, Hashbed, Hāshvīt, and Hāshwet) is a village in Chalanchulan Rural District, Silakhor District, Dorud County, Lorestan Province, Iran. At the 2006 census, its population was 210, in 46 families.
