= Bovaki =

Bovaki باوكي
- Village
- Location within Iran
- Coordinates: 33°19′48″N 49°35′36″E
- Country: Iran
- Province: Lorestan
- County: Aligudarz
- Bakhsh: Central
- Rural District: Pachehlak-e Sharqi

Population (2006)
  - Total: 451
- Time zone: UTC+3:30 (IRST)
  - Summer (DST): UTC+4:30 (IRDT)

Bovaki (Persian: باوكي, also Romanized as Bovakī, Bauki, Bāvakī, and Bāvkī; also known as ‘Alī Āqā and Būk) is a village in Pachehlak-e Sharqi Rural District, in the Central District of Aligudarz County, Lorestan Province, Iran. According to the 2006 census, its population was 451, in 78 families.
