= Farhang-e Soruri =

Persian dictionary by Soruri Kashani

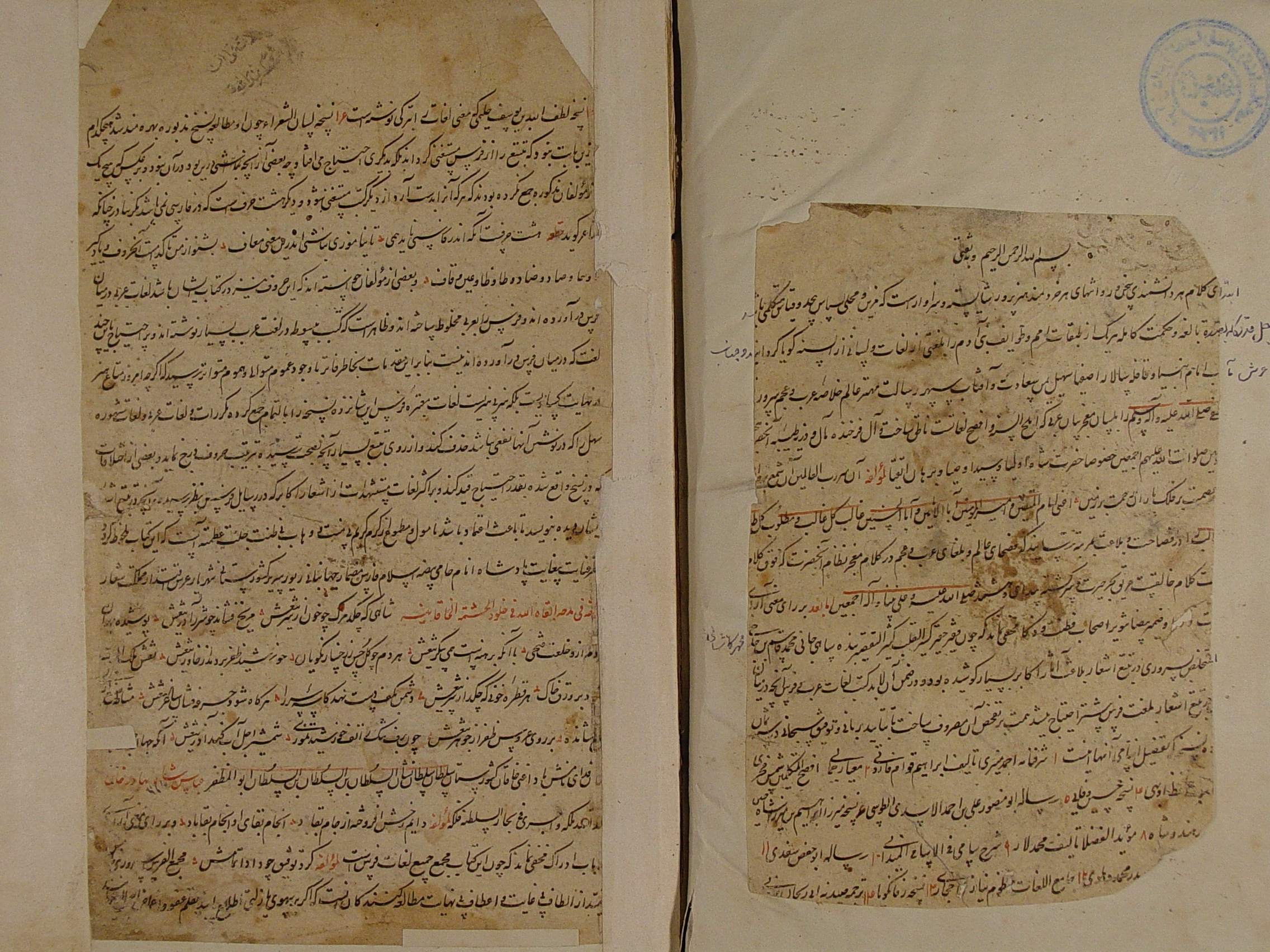
- First and last pages of the Farhang-e Soruri
- Author: Soruri Kashani
- Language: Persian
- Genre: Dictionary
- Publication date: 1599/1600
- Publication place: Safavid Iran

The Farhang-e Soruri (Persian: فرهنگ سروری), also known as Majma al-fors and Loghat-e Soruri, is a Persian dictionary composed by the Safavid poet and lexicographer Soruri Kashani in 1599/1600. It was dedicated to the Safavid ruler Shah Abbas I (r. 1587–1629). After becoming familiar with the Farhang-i Jahangiri by 1618, Soruri created a second edition of his Farhang-e Soruri, significantly increasing its list of words and including a second opening. With more than 6,000 words, the Farhang-e Soruri is primarily composed of old Persian words that were scarcely used in the 17th-century but were used by early Persian poets.

Twenty-eight chapters, an index, and two openings make up the dictionary. The dictionary is presented in an alphabetical order. Each chapter consists of all words that begin with the same letter. Most of the listed words are described as having several meanings. The meanings are supplemented by verses from early Persian poets such as Daqiqi, Ferdowsi, Asadi Tusi, Unsuri, Farrukhi Sistani, Suzani Samarqandi, Munjik Tirmidhi, Sanai, and Anvari. The dictionary also shows regional pronunciations in Iran, focusing on vowel sounds.

One of the earliest Persian dictionaries, written by Abu Hafs Sughdi at the end of the 9th or the beginning of the 10th century and no longer extant, is one of the sources included in Soruri's dictionary, which makes it of high significance. Multiple sentences from this dictionary are cited by Soruri. Written in Iran, the Farhang-e Soruri is notable in a period when Persian lexicography was mostly being created in India.

== Sources ==
- Bayevsky, S. (2020). "Farhang-e Sorūrī". Encyclopaedia Iranica Online. Brill.
