= Bidestan, Torbat-e Jam =

Bidestan بيدستان
- Village
- Location within Iran
- Coordinates: 35°19′27″N 60°17′00″E
- Country: Iran
- Province: Razavi Khorasan
- County: Torbat-e Jam
- Bakhsh: Nasrabad
- Rural District: Bala Jam

Population (2006)
  - Total: 124
- Time zone: UTC+3:30 (IRST)
  - Summer (DST): UTC+4:30 (IRDT)

Bidestan (Persian: بيدستان, also Romanized as Bīdestān; also known as Zardālūvak) is a village in Bala Jam Rural District, Nasrabad District, Torbat-e Jam County, Razavi Khorasan Province, Iran. At the 2006 census, its population was 124, in 26 families.
