= Ashurabad, Gilan =

Ashurabad عاشور آباد
- Village
- Location within Iran
- Coordinates: 36°53′06″N 49°59′43″E
- Country: Iran
- Province: Gilan
- County: Siahkal
- Bakhsh: Deylaman
- Rural District: Deylaman

Population (2016)
  - Total: 81
- Time zone: UTC+3:30 (IRST)

Ashurabad (Persian: عاشورآباد, also Romanized as ‘Āshūrābād; also known as ‘Āshūrābād-e Bālā) is a village in Deylaman Rural District, Deylaman District, Siahkal County, Gilan Province, Iran. Its population was 81 people in 31 households as of the 2016 census.
