= Mian Rudan, Markazi =

Mian Rudan میان‌رودان
- Village
- Location within Iran
- Coordinates: 33°40′56″N 50°16′07″E
- Country: Iran
- Province: Markazi
- County: Khomeyn
- Bakhsh: Central
- Rural District: Galehzan

Population (2006)
  - Total: 61
- Time zone: UTC+3:30 (IRST)
  - Summer (DST): UTC+4:30 (IRDT)

Mian Rudan (Persian: میان‌رودان, also Romanized as Mīān Rūdān and Miyan Roodan; also known as Mīānrūd) is a village in Galehzan Rural District, in the Central District of Khomeyn County, Markazi Province, Iran. At the 2006 census, its population was 61, in 20 families.
