= Tazkera-ye Taher-e Nasrabadi =

The Tazkera-ye Taher-e Nasrabadi (Persian: تذکرهٔ طاهر نصرآبادی) is a 17th-century Persian collection of brief biographies of around 1,000 poets from Safavid Iran. It was composed in 1680 by the poet and literary historian Mirza Mohammad Taher Nasrabadi in dedication to the Safavid shah Suleiman I (r. 1666–1694).

The book divided the Persian literary world into three areas: Iran, Turan, and India. However, the focus was predominantly on Safavid Iran.

== Sources ==
- Fotoohi, Mahmoud (2020). "Taḏkera-ye Naṣrābādi". Encyclopaedia Iranica Online. Brill. doi:10.1163/2330-4804_EIRO_COM_10916.
- Sharma, Sunil (2021). "Local and Transregional Places in the Works of Safavid Men Of Letters". In Melville, Charles (ed.). Safavid Persia in the Age of Empires, the Idea of Iran Vol. 10. Bloomsbury Publishing. pp. 309–330. ISBN 9780755633784.
