= Bidastan, Kohgiluyeh and Boyer-Ahmad =

Bidastan بيدستان
- Village
- Location within Iran
- Coordinates: 30°17′22″N 51°14′21″E
- Country: Iran
- Province: Kohgiluyeh and Boyer-Ahmad
- County: Basht
- Bakhsh: Basht
- Rural District: Babuyi

Population (2006)
  - Total: 150
- Time zone: UTC+3:30 (IRST)
  - Summer (DST): UTC+4:30 (IRDT)

Bidastan (Persian: بيدستان, also Romanized as Bīdastān) is a village in Babuyi Rural District, Basht District, Basht County, Kohgiluyeh and Boyer-Ahmad Province, Iran. At the 2006 census, its population was 150, in 26 families.
