= Bahar-i Ajam =

Bahar-i Ajam (Persian: بهار عجم) is an 18th-century dictionary of Persian words and idioms used in Persian poetry. The author of the work was the Indian poet Lala Tik Chand (died 1766), a Khatri from Delhi, who probably started writing it in 1720, completed it in 1739, and published the book in 1743.

== Sources ==
- Afsharian, Marjan (2015). "Bahār-i ʿAjam". In Madelung, Wilferd; Daftary, Farhad (eds.). Encyclopaedia Islamica Online. Brill Online. ISSN 1875-9831.
