= Munjik Tirmidhi =

Persian poet (10th-century)

Munjik Tirmidhi (Persian: منجیک ترمذی; fl. second half of the 10th-century) was a Persian poet who is best known for his satirical poems. A native of the city of Tirmidh, he served as a panegyrist of the local Muhtajid dynasty of Chaghaniyan.

== Sources ==
- Shavarebi, Ehsan (2021). "Munjīk Tirmidhī". In Fleet, Kate; Krämer, Gudrun; Matringe, Denis; Nawas, John; Rowson, Everett (eds.). Encyclopaedia of Islam (3rd ed.). Brill Online. ISSN 1873-9830.
