= Farhang-i Jahangiri =

17th-century Persian dictionary

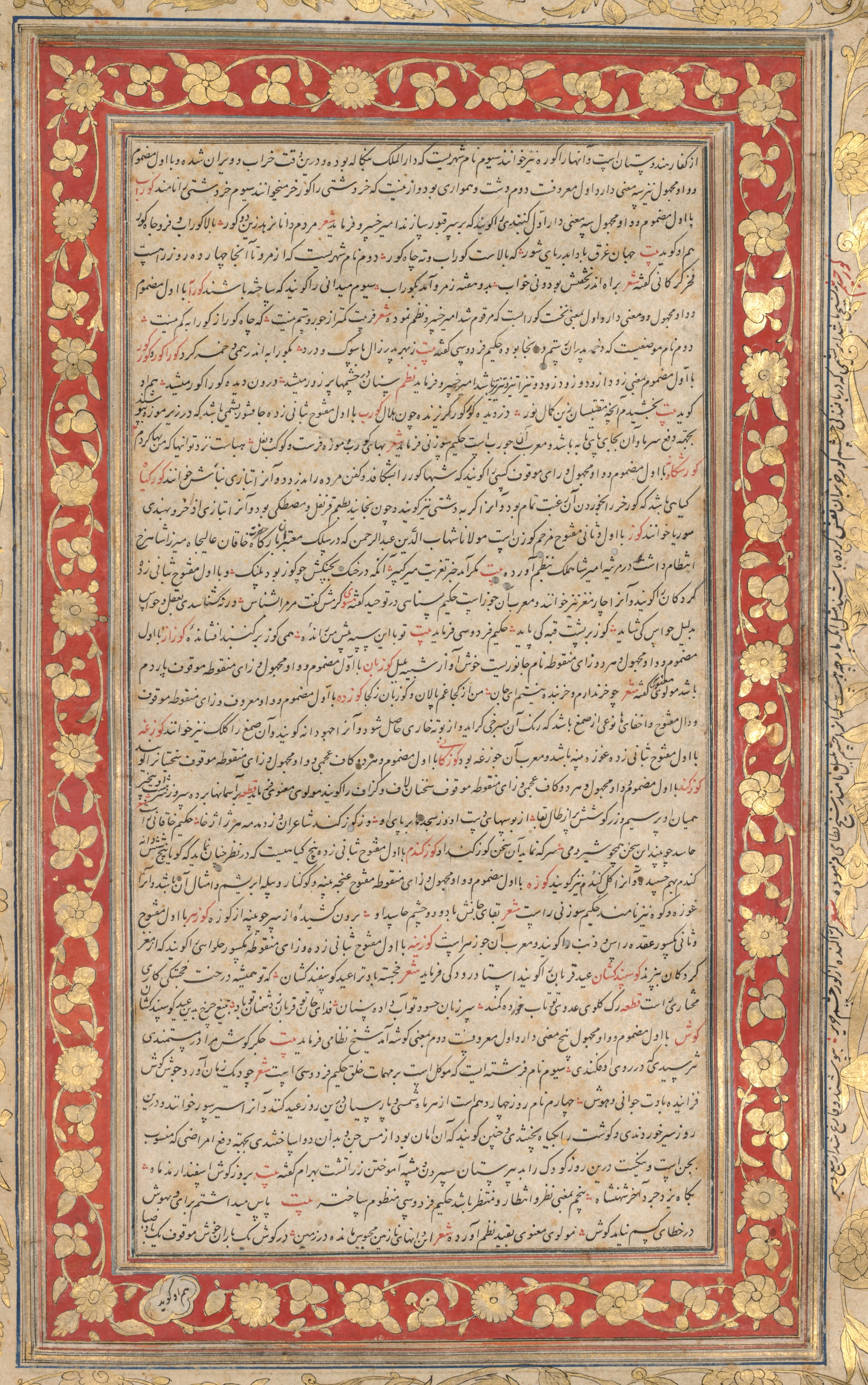
Recto and verso of an illuminated folio, from a manuscript of the Farhang-i Jahangiri.

The Farhang-i Jahangiri (Persian: فرهنگ جهانگیری, lit. 'Jahangir's dictionary') is a Persian dictionary compiled in the 17th century by Mir Jamal al-din Husayn Inju, and commissioned by Mughal Emperor Akbar. It is one of the most important Persian-language dictionaries produced in Mughal India, and has been termed a "benchmark" in the genre of Persian dictionary-writing.

== Writing ==
Mir Jamal al-din Husayn Inju hailed from Shiraz (in present-day Iran), born into a noble Sayyid family. He emigrated to Mughal India at an early age, spending the majority of his life in the city of Agra. He rose to a prominent position in the court of the Mughal Emperor Akbar, and began writing the dictionary at the ruler's request in the 1590s. Inju was advised by Akbar to investigate words and idioms from Middle Persian, to understand the nature of the Persian language before it was influenced by Arabic; this was a major objective of the dictionary. Muzaffar Alam interprets this as emblematic of a larger trend of Persian linguistic purification attempts in Mughal India. Richard Eaton views the production of this dictionary as part of efforts by Akbar to associate the Mughal court with Persian culture.

The dictionary was completed after twelve years in 1608, by which time Akbar had died and been succeeded by his son Jahangir; Inju hence named the dictionary in honor of him. In 1622, Inju authored a second edition of the dictionary. The Farhang-i Jahangiri was considered a standard dictionary of Persian in the early 17th century. It was highly influential on subsequent dictionaries such as Farhang-i Rashidi and Burhan-i Qati. It also inspired the contemporary Iranian poet and lexicographer Soruri Kashani to write a second edition of his dictionary Farhang-e Soruri.

== Content ==
The Farhang-i Jahangiri lists 9,830 words, arranged in alphabetical order. The ordering is unconventional in that it is alphabetised by second letter of the word, then first letter. These words were taken from the works of an extensive number of Persian poets. Each entry provides a definition as well as poetic verses where the word was used. The dictionary used at least 44 Persian dictionaries as sources, as well as Persian technical treatises and oral sources.

The dictionary contains an introduction, which includes a discussion of the sources and a detailed study of the Persian language. The dictionary's supplement includes five glossaries.
