= Bidestan, Yazd =

Bidestan بيدستان
- Village
- Location within Iran
- Coordinates: 31°34′58″N 53°48′39″E
- Country: Iran
- Province: Yazd
- County: Taft
- Bakhsh: Central
- Rural District: Dehshir

Population (2006)
  - Total: 11
- Time zone: UTC+3:30 (IRST)
  - Summer (DST): UTC+4:30 (IRDT)

Bidestan (Persian: بيدستان, also Romanized as Bīdestān) is a village in Dehshir Rural District, in the Central District of Taft County, Yazd Province, Iran. At the 2006 census, its population was 11, in 5 families.
