= Suzani Samarqandi =

12th-century Persian poet

Shams al-Dīn Muhammad b. ‘Alī (or possibly Mas‘ūd) (Persian: شمس‌الدین محمد بن علی) (d. 1166) was a poet born in Samarqand or its vicinity. He is more often known by the name Suzani (سوزنی, 'needle maker'), or Suzani Samarqandi (سوزنی سمرقندی). According to one theory, the name is said to have arisen because of his violent passion for a needle-maker's apprentice under whose influence he supposedly took up the twin crafts of needle making and poetry. According to his own claim, he was a scion of the family of Salman the Persian, a famous companion of the Islamic prophet Muhammad.

Details of his life (he died in 562/1166) are lacking, apart from what we can gather from his works. He took a knowledge of Arabic for granted. He was also remarkably well read, and that his knowledge of Christianity and Manichaeism was exceptional, while his frequent use of Turkic words shows his broad language skills. To make his livelihood, he addressed eulogistic verses to greater and lesser rulers, though he stayed in Samarqand. He did not hesitate to include lewd and insulting remarks in his satire, for which he had many a down-to-earth metaphor and turn of phrase. Suzani was a genuinely realistic poet with an unmistakable poetic talent.
