= Azna, Lorestan =

City in Lorestan province, Iran

Azna Persian: ازنا
- City
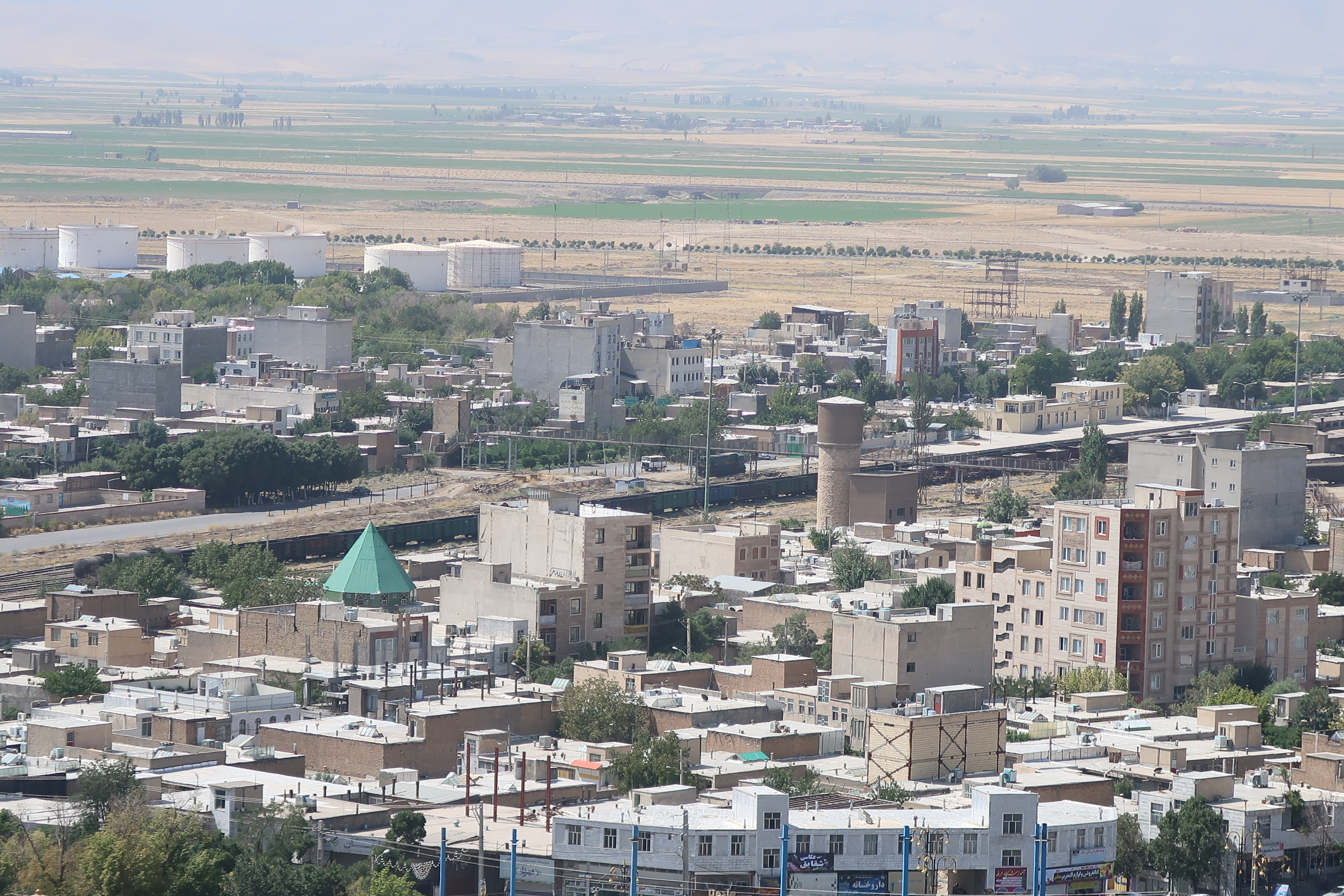

- Location within Iran
- Coordinates: 33°27′35″N 49°27′17″E
- Country: Iran
- Province: Lorestan
- County: Azna
- District: Central

Population (2016)
  - Total: 47,489
- Time zone: UTC+3:30 (IRST)

Azna (Persian: ازنا) (Note: Also romanized as Aznā and Eznā) is a city in the Central District of Azna County, Lorestan province, Iran, serving as capital of both the county and the district.

== Demographics ==
=== Population ===
At the time of the 2006 National Census, the city's population was 37,645 in 9,178 households. The following census in 2011 counted 40,145 people in 11,128 households. The 2016 census measured the population of the city as 47,489 people in 14,208 households.

== Geography ==
In the Zagros Mountains, the city is 133 km. east of Khoramabad and 75 km. south of Arak. The city is en route Esfahan–Khuzestan and is connected to the railway network of the country.

=== Climate ===
Azna has a dry-summer continental climate(Dsa) in Köppen climate classification with precipitation being higher in winter months than summer. Summers are dry and hot with very low precipitation from June to September. Winters are very cold and relatively wet.

Climate data for Azna (2000-2005, elevation:1871.9)
Month	Jan	Feb	Mar	Apr	May	Jun	Jul	Aug	Sep	Oct	Nov	Dec	Year
Daily mean °C (°F)	−2.4 (27.7)	0.9 (33.6)	7.5 (45.5)	11.7 (53.1)	15.8 (60.4)	21.3 (70.3)	25.3 (77.5)	24.6 (76.3)	20.0 (68.0)	14.9 (58.8)	7.3 (45.1)	1.8 (35.2)	12.4 (54.3)
Average precipitation mm (inches)	76.2 (3.00)	34.9 (1.37)	69.8 (2.75)	98.4 (3.87)	25.5 (1.00)	2.2 (0.09)	0.0 (0.0)	0.0 (0.0)	1.1 (0.04)	14.3 (0.56)	37.2 (1.46)	96.6 (3.80)	456.2 (17.94)
Source: IRIMO(temperature), (precipitation)

== Civilian casualties of 2025-2026 Iranian protests in Azna, Lorestan ==
Beginning on 28 December 2025, mass demonstrations erupted across multiple cities in Iran amid a deepening economic crisis and widespread dissatisfaction with the government. While initially sparked by frustration over skyrocketing inflation, rising food prices, and the severe depreciation of the Iranian rial, the protests quickly evolved into a broader movement demanding an end to the Islamic Republic's rule.

On 1 January 2026, Reza Moradi Abdolvand, an 18-year-old citizen from Azna, fell into a coma after being shot directly by forces of the Islamic Republic of Iran, and died on 5 January 2026. He was the sixth civilian to die in Azna during the 2025–2026 Iranian protests.

Hengaw Organization of Human Rights reported the killing of three protestors, including a child in the city of Azna, in Iran’s Lorestan province, after Iranian forces opened fire. Hengaw Organization for Human Rights confirmed that the victims were Mostafa (surname unknown), 15, Shayan Asadollahi, 30, and Vahab Musavi, all residents of Azna. They were killed on the evening of Thursday, 1 January 2026, when Iranian forces opened fire on demonstrators. The killing of Ahmadreza Amani was also reported on the same date. Amani was struck in the chest by live ammunition fired by state forces. Amani, a law graduate and trainee lawyer, was rushed to hospital following the shooting but died shortly after arrival due to severe internal bleeding.
