= Silakhor-e Sharqi Rural District =

Rural district in Lorestan province, Iran

Silakhor-e Sharqi Rural District Persian: دهستان سیلاخور شرقی
- Rural District
- Location within Iran
- Coordinates: 33°28′N 49°20′E
- Country: Iran
- Province: Lorestan
- County: Azna
- District: Central
- Established: 1987
- Capital: Darband

Population (2016)
  - Total: 7,152
- Time zone: UTC+3:30 (IRST)

Silakhor-e Sharqi Rural District (Persian: دهستان سیلاخور شرقی) is in the Central District of Azna County, Lorestan province, Iran. Its capital is the village of Darband.

== Demographics ==
=== Population ===
At the time of the 2006 National Census, the rural district's population was 8,171 in 1,763 households. There were 7,652 inhabitants in 2,004 households at the following census of 2011. The 2016 census measured the population of the rural district as 7,152 in 2,086 households. The most populous of its 20 villages was Darband, with about 1,903 people.

=== Other villages in the rural district ===
- Kalkaleh
- Masoudabad
- Pazardalu
- Qaleh-ye Rostam
- Tian
- Zarnan
