= Japelaq-e Sharqi Rural District =

Rural district in Lorestan province, Iran

Japelaq-e Sharqi Rural District Persian: دهستان جاپلق شرقی
- Rural District
- Location within Iran
- Coordinates: 33°37′N 49°32′E
- Country: Iran
- Province: Lorestan
- County: Azna
- District: Japelaq
- Established: 1987
- Capital: Momenabad

Population (2016)
  - Total: 5,289
- Time zone: UTC+3:30 (IRST)

Japelaq-e Sharqi Rural District (Persian: دهستان جاپلق شرقی) is in Japelaq District of Azna County, Lorestan province, Iran. It is administered from the city of Momenabad. (Note: Formerly Mamuran)

== Demographics ==
=== Population ===
At the time of the 2006 National Census, the rural district's population was 6,337 in 1,647 households. There were 5,683 inhabitants in 1,699 households at the following census of 2011. The 2016 census measured the population of the rural district as 5,289 in 1,698 households. The most populous of its 28 villages was Marzian, with 986 people.

=== Other villages in the rural district ===
- Emamzadeh Qasem
- Farzian
- Gavbar-e Sofla
- Geligerd
- Modabad
- Zanganeh Ganjeh
