= Pachehlak-e Gharbi Rural District =

Rural district in Lorestan province, Iran

Pachehlak-e Gharbi Rural District Persian: دهستان پاچه‌لک غربی
- Rural District
- Location within Iran
- Coordinates: 33°23′N 49°27′E
- Country: Iran
- Province: Lorestan
- County: Azna
- District: Central
- Established: 1987

Population (2016)
  - Total: 10,237
- Time zone: UTC+3:30 (IRST)

Pachehlak-e Gharbi Rural District (Persian: دهستان پاچه‌لک غربی) is in the Central District of Azna County, Lorestan province, Iran. Its capital was the village of Shahrak-e Almahdi, now a neighborhood in the city of Azna.

== Demographics ==
=== Population ===
At the time of the 2006 National Census, the rural district's population was 12,864 in 2,744 households. There were 13,471 inhabitants in 3,589 households at the following census of 2011. The 2016 census measured the population of the rural district as 10,237 in 2,825 households. The most populous of its 39 villages was Gorji, with 2,971 people.

=== Other villages in the rural district ===
- Bagh Muri
- Borjeleh
- Darreh Takht
- Dowlatabad
- Kamandan
- Nosratabad
- Siavashabad
