= Japelaq-e Gharbi Rural District =

Rural district in Lorestan province, Iran

Japelaq-e Gharbi Rural District Persian: دهستان جاپلق غربی
- Rural District
- Location within Iran
- Coordinates: 33°36′N 49°23′E
- Country: Iran
- Province: Lorestan
- County: Azna
- District: Japelaq
- Established: 1987
- Capital: Ashurabad

Population (2016)
  - Total: 2,915
- Time zone: UTC+3:30 (IRST)

Japelaq-e Gharbi Rural District (Persian: دهستان جاپلق غربی) is in Japelaq District of Azna County, Lorestan province, Iran. Its capital is the village of Ashurabad.

== Demographics ==
=== Population ===
At the time of the 2006 National Census, the rural district's population was 4,215 in 1,005 households. There were 3,036 inhabitants in 964 households at the following census of 2011. The 2016 census measured the population of the rural district as 2,915 in 1,037 households. The most populous of its 30 villages was Ashurabad, with 801 people.

=== Other villages in the rural district ===
- Aqai
- Davud-e Peyghambar
- Galeh
- Kahriz
- Kolbor
- Malicheh
- Panj Zowj
