= Central District (Azna County) =

District in Lorestan province, Iran

Central District (Azna County) Persian: بخش مرکزی شهرستان ازنا
- District
- Location within Iran
- Coordinates: 33°25′N 49°26′E
- Country: Iran
- Province: Lorestan
- County: Azna
- Established: 1994
- Capital: Azna

Population (2016)
  - Total: 64,878
- Time zone: UTC+3:30 (IRST)

The Central District of Azna County (Persian: بخش مرکزی شهرستان ازنا) is in Lorestan province, Iran. Its capital is the city of Azna.

== Demographics ==
=== Population ===
At the time of the 2006 National Census, the district's population was 58,680 in 13,685 households. The following census in 2011 counted 61,268 people in 16,721 households. The 2016 census measured the population of the district as 64,878 inhabitants in 19,119 households.

=== Administrative divisions ===
Central District (Azna County) Population
Administrative Divisions	2006	2011	2016
Pachehlak-e Gharbi RD	12,864	13,471	10,237
Silakhor-e Sharqi RD	8,171	7,652	7,152
Azna (city)	37,645	40,145	47,489
Total	58,680	61,268	64,878
RD = Rural District
