= Japelaq District =

District in Lorestan province, Iran

Japelaq District Persian: بخش جاپلق
- District
- Location within Iran
- Coordinates: 33°36′N 49°28′E
- Country: Iran
- Province: Lorestan
- County: Azna
- Established: 1995
- Capital: Momenabad

Population (2016)
  - Total: 10,025
- Time zone: UTC+3:30 (IRST)

Japelaq District (Persian: بخش جاپلق) is in Azna County, Lorestan province, Iran. Its capital is the city of Momenabad. (Note: Formerly Mamuran)

== Demographics ==
=== Population ===
At the time of the 2006 National Census, the district's population was 11,782 in 2,978 households. The following census in 2011 counted 10,280 people in 3,129 households. The 2016 census measured the population of the district as 10,025 inhabitants in 3,285 households.

=== Administrative divisions ===
Japelaq District Population
Administrative Divisions	2006	2011	2016
Japelaq-e Gharbi RD	4,215	3,036	2,915
Japelaq-e Sharqi RD	6,337	5,683	5,289
Momenabad (city)	1,230	1,561	1,821
Total	11,782	10,280	10,025
RD = Rural District
