= Azna County =

County in Lorestan province, Iran

Azna County Persian: شهرستان ازنا
- County
- Location of Azna County in Lorestan province (right, purple)

- Location of Lorestan province in Iran
- Coordinates: 33°29′N 49°26′E
- Country: Iran
- Provinces: Lorestan
- Established: 1994
- Capital: Azna
- Districts: Central, Japelaq

Population (2016)
  - Total: 74,936
- Time zone: UTC+3:30 (IRST)

Azna County (Persian: شهرستان ازنا) is in Lorestan province, Iran. Its capital is the city of Azna.

== Demographics ==
=== Population ===
At the time of the 2006 National Census, the county's population was 70,462 in 16,663 households. The following census in 2011 counted 71,586 people in 19,843 households. The 2016 census measured the population of the county as 74,936 in 22,411 households.

=== Administrative divisions ===
Azna County's population history and administrative structure over three consecutive censuses are shown in the following table.

Azna County Population
Administrative Divisions	2006	2011	2016
Central District	58,680	61,268	64,878
Pachehlak-e Gharbi RD	12,864	13,471	10,237
Silakhor-e Sharqi RD	8,171	7,652	7,152
Azna (city)	37,645	40,145	47,489
Japelaq District	11,782	10,280	10,025
Japelaq-e Gharbi RD	4,215	3,036	2,915
Japelaq-e Sharqi RD	6,337	5,683	5,289
Momenabad (city) (Note: Formerly the village of Mamuran)	1,230	1,561	1,821
Total	70,462	71,586	74,936
RD = Rural District

== See also ==
Media related to Azna County at Wikimedia Commons
