= Phulwari =

Phulwari (lit. 'garden') may refer to:

- Phulwari, Iran
- Phulwari, Nepal
- Phulwari (1984 film), a Hindi film
- Phoolwari, a 1946 Indian Bollywood film
- Phulwari Sharif, town in Patna district, Bihar, India
  - Phulwari Sharif railway station
  - Phulwari (Vidhan Sabha constituency)

== See also ==
- Phulwaria, a city in Uttar Pradesh, India
- Phulwariwa, a village in Bihar, India
- Phulwari Ki Nal Wildlife Sanctuary, Rajasthan, India
- Sikh Phulwari
