= Chahar Cheshmeh =

Chahar Cheshmeh or Chehar Chashmeh (Persian: چهارچشمه) may refer to:

- Chahar Cheshmeh, Hamadan
- Chahar Cheshmeh-ye Nazem, Lorestan Province
- Chahar Cheshmeh, Markazi
- Chahar Cheshmeh, alternate name of Qaleh-ye Hajji Shafi, Markazi Province
- Chahar Cheshmeh-ye Olya, Razavi Khorasan Province
- Chahar Cheshmeh Rural District, in Markazi Province
