= Kukah =

Kukah or Kookeh or Kukeh (Persian: كوكه) may refer to:

- Kukah, Markazi
- Kukeh, West Azerbaijan
