= Chahar Taq, Markazi =

Village in Markazi province, Iran

Chahar Taq Persian: چهارطاق
- Village
- Location within Iran
- Coordinates: 33°41′26″N 49°49′27″E
- Country: Iran
- Province: Markazi
- County: Khomeyn
- District: Kamareh
- Rural District: Khorram Dasht

Population (2016)
  - Total: 358
- Time zone: UTC+3:30 (IRST)

Chahar Taq (Persian: چهارطاق) (Note: Also romanized as Chahār Ţāq; also known as Chahar Tagh, Chahār Tak, and Chehārtak) is a village in Khorram Dasht Rural District of Kamareh District in Khomeyn County, Markazi province, Iran.

== Demographics ==
=== Population ===
At the time of the 2006 National Census, the village's population was 543 in 145 households. The following census in 2011 counted 387 people in 113 households. The 2016 census measured the population of the village as 358 people in 113 households.
