= Lilihan carpets and rugs =

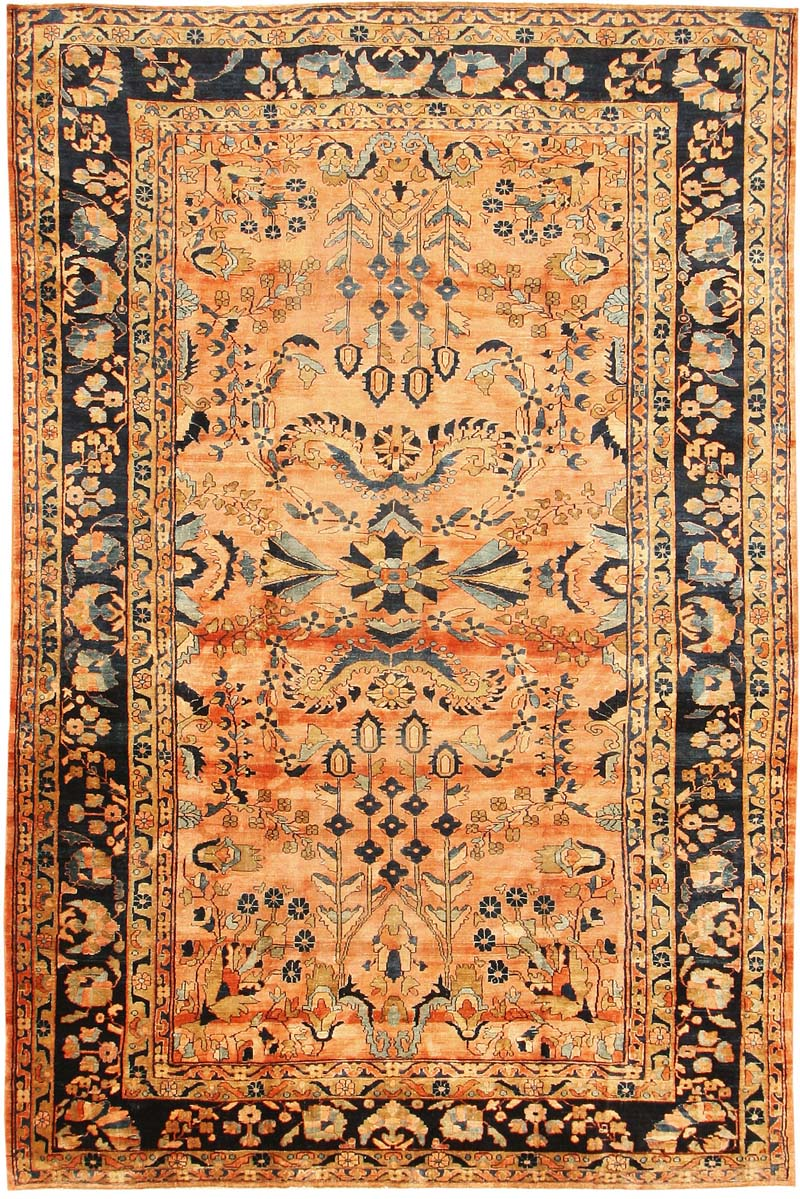

Armenians wove Lilihans in Lilihan village in what used to be called Kamareh (now Khomeyn) district in Iran. The term Lilihan is better known in the US, in Europe it is not as widely used.

== Structure ==
Although a wide range of carpet and mat sizes are produced, the most common sizes found are 4 x 6 to 8 x 10 feet.3 The use of a longer pile traditionally appealed to Americans.4 The Lilihan rugs are executed using the Hamadan (single-wefted) weave, typically this means that they have one heavy cotton weft and are made with thick, first quality wool. The Lilihan rugs are the only fabrics in the Sultanabad region to be single-wefted. Lilihan carpets and rugs are coarsely, but tightly flat woven, making them extremely durable.

== Design ==
Lilihan carpets and rugs are similar to Sarouk rug carpets in colour, style and thickness.6 According to Leslie Stroh of Rug News, there are about 3000 different designs for Hamadan rugs. This is attributed to 1500 villages in the Hamadan region that each produced two styles of designs. While some geometric patterns can be found amongst Lilihan carpets, the more prevalent designs are traditional floral motifs.7

== Colour ==
The pink colour of the weft, distinguishes the Lilihan carpets from all others. Khaki and brown also accentuate the primarily salmon field colour.8
