= Khalilabad, Markazi =

Village in Markazi province, Iran

Khalilabad Persian: خليل اباد
- Village
- Location within Iran
- Coordinates: 33°35′32″N 49°48′21″E
- Country: Iran
- Province: Markazi
- County: Khomeyn
- District: Kamareh
- Rural District: Chahar Cheshmeh

Population (2016)
  - Total: 356
- Time zone: UTC+3:30 (IRST)

Khalilabad (Persian: خليل اباد) (Note: Also romanized as Khalīlābād; also known as Khalil Abad Japlogh) is a village in Chahar Cheshmeh Rural District of Kamareh District in Khomeyn County, Markazi province, Iran.

== Demographics ==
=== Population ===
At the time of the 2006 National Census, the village's population was 534 in 150 households. The following census in 2011 counted 446 people in 162 households. The 2016 census measured the population of the village as 356 people in 153 households.
