= Tayyebabad =

Village in Markazi province, Iran

Tayyebabad Persian: طيب اباد
- Village
- Location within Iran
- Coordinates: 33°41′10″N 49°47′21″E
- Country: Iran
- Province: Markazi
- County: Khomeyn
- District: Kamareh
- Rural District: Khorram Dasht

Population (2016)
  - Total: 310
- Time zone: UTC+3:30 (IRST)

Tayyebabad (Persian: طيب اباد) (Note: Also romanized as Ţayyebābād and Teybābād; also known as Ţayyeb and Ţīb) is a village in Khorram Dasht Rural District of Kamareh District in Khomeyn County, Markazi province, Iran.

== Demographics ==
=== Population ===
At the time of the 2006 National Census, the village's population was 428 in 108 households. The following census in 2011 counted 410 people in 119 households. The 2016 census measured the population of the village as 310 people in 107 households.
