= Lakan, Markazi =

Village in Markazi province, Iran

Lakan Persian: لكان
- Village
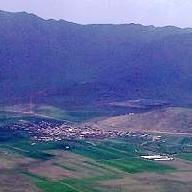
- The village of Lakan

- Location within Iran
- Coordinates: 33°42′16″N 49°44′12″E
- Country: Iran
- Province: Markazi
- County: Khomeyn
- District: Kamareh
- Rural District: Khorram Dasht

Population (2016)
  - Total: 662
- Time zone: UTC+3:30 (IRST)

Lakan (Persian: لكان) (Note: Also romanized as Lakān; also known as Lagān, Lākhaūn, and Lākhūn) is a village in Khorram Dasht Rural District of Kamareh District in Khomeyn County, Markazi province, Iran.

== Demographics ==
=== Population ===
At the time of the 2006 National Census, the village's population was 870 in 256 households. The following census in 2011 counted 682 people in 238 households. The 2016 census measured the population of the village as 662 people in 243 households.
