= Vasheh =

Vasheh (Persian: واشه) may refer to:

- Vasheh, Markazi
- Vasheh, Khomeyn, Markazi Province
