= Mohammadiyeh, Khomeyn =

Village in Markazi province, Iran

Mohammadiyeh Persian: محمديه
- Village
- Location within Iran
- Country: Iran
- Province: Markazi
- County: Khomeyn
- District: Kamareh
- Rural District: Khorram Dasht

Population (2016)
  - Total: 254
- Time zone: UTC+3:30 (IRST)

Mohammadiyeh (Persian: محمديه) (Note: Also romanized as Moḩammadīyeh) is a village in Khorram Dasht Rural District of Kamareh District in Khomeyn County, Markazi province, Iran.

== Demographics ==
=== Population ===
At the time of the 2006 National Census, the village's population was 494 in 124 households. The following census in 2011 counted 389 people in 109 households. The 2016 census measured the population of the village as 254 people in 92 households.
