= Qaleh Babu =

Village in Markazi province, Iran

Qaleh Babu Persian: قلعه بابو
- Village
- Location within Iran
- Coordinates: 33°37′00″N 49°38′58″E
- Country: Iran
- Province: Markazi
- County: Khomeyn
- District: Kamareh
- Rural District: Chahar Cheshmeh

Population (2016)
  - Total: 300
- Time zone: UTC+3:30 (IRST)

Qaleh Babu (Persian: قلعه بابو) (Note: Also romanized as Qal‘eh Bābū and Qal‘eh-ye Bābū; also known as Ghal’eh Baboo and Qal‘eh Bānū) is a village in Chahar Cheshmeh Rural District of Kamareh District in Khomeyn County, Markazi province, Iran.

== Demographics ==
=== Population ===
At the time of the 2006 National Census, the village's population was 414 in 93 households. The following census in 2011 counted 346 people in 89 households. The 2016 census measured the population of the village as 300 people in 91 households.
