= Domaney =

Village in Markazi province, Iran

Domaney Persian: دمني
- Village
- Location within Iran
- Coordinates: 33°34′40″N 49°36′18″E
- Country: Iran
- Province: Markazi
- County: Khomeyn
- District: Kamareh
- Rural District: Chahar Cheshmeh

Population (2016)
  - Total: 462
- Time zone: UTC+3:30 (IRST)

Domaney (Persian: دمني) is a village in Chahar Cheshmeh Rural District of Kamareh District in Khomeyn County, Markazi province, Iran.

== Demographics ==
=== Population ===
At the time of the 2006 National Census, the village's population was 784 in 200 households. The following census in 2011 counted 649 people in 204 households. The 2016 census measured the population of the village as 462 people in 161 households.
