= Fargas =

Fargas may refer to:

- Fargas, Iran, a village in Markazi Province, Iran
- Antonio Fargas (born 1946), American actor
- Johneshwy Fargas (born 1994), Puerto Rican baseball player
- Justin Fargas (born 1980), American football running back
