= Poluli =

Poluli پلولي
- Village
- Location within Iran
- Coordinates: 33°35′39″N 49°41′45″E
- Country: Iran
- Province: Markazi
- County: Khomeyn
- Bakhsh: Kamareh
- Rural District: Chahar Cheshmeh

Population (2006)
  - Total: 30
- Time zone: UTC+3:30 (IRST)
  - Summer (DST): UTC+4:30 (IRDT)

Poluli (Persian: پلولي, also Romanized as Polūlī, Polooli, Pelowlī, and Pelūlī; also known as Fūlvārī and Phulwāri) is a village in Chahar Cheshmeh Rural District, Kamareh District, Khomeyn County, Markazi Province, Iran. At the 2006 census, its population was 30, in 8 families.
