= Javadiyeh, Markazi =

Village in Markazi province, Iran

Javadiyeh Persian: جواديه
- Village
- Location within Iran
- Coordinates: 33°38′18″N 49°41′12″E
- Country: Iran
- Province: Markazi
- County: Khomeyn
- District: Kamareh
- Rural District: Chahar Cheshmeh

Population (2016)
  - Total: 387
- Time zone: UTC+3:30 (IRST)

Javadiyeh (Persian: جواديه) (Note: Also romanized as Javādīyeh) is a village in, and the capital of, Chahar Cheshmeh Rural District in Kamareh District of Khomeyn County, Markazi province, Iran.

== Demographics ==
=== Population ===
At the time of the 2006 National Census, the village's population was 574 in 162 households. The following census in 2011 counted 516 people in 157 households. The 2016 census measured the population of the village as 387 people in 135 households.
