= Qaleh-ye Hajji Shafi =

Village in Markazi, Iran

Qaleh-ye Hajji Shafi قلعه حاجي شفيع
- Village
- Location within Iran
- Coordinates: 33°38′22″N 49°40′47″E
- Country: Iran
- Province: Markazi
- County: Khomeyn
- Bakhsh: Kamareh
- Rural District: Chahar Cheshmeh

Population (2006)
  - Total: 31
- Time zone: UTC+3:30 (IRST)
  - Summer (DST): UTC+4:30 (IRDT)

Qaleh-ye Hajji Shafi (Persian: قلعه حاجي شفيع, also Romanized as Qal‘eh-ye Ḩājjī Shafī‘; also known as Chahār Cheshmeh and Qal‘eh-ye Ḩājj Shafī‘) is a village in Chahar Cheshmeh Rural District, Kamareh District, Khomeyn County, Markazi Province, Iran. At the 2006 census, its population was 31, in 12 families.
