= Chaqa Seyf ol Din =

Village in Markazi province, Iran

Chaqa Seyf ol Din Persian: چغاسيف الدين
- Village
- Location within Iran
- Coordinates: 33°39′58″N 49°38′06″E
- Country: Iran
- Province: Markazi
- County: Khomeyn
- District: Kamareh
- Rural District: Chahar Cheshmeh

Population (2016)
  - Total: 671
- Time zone: UTC+3:30 (IRST)

Chaqa Seyf ol Din (Persian: چغاسيف الدين) (Note: Also known as Chegā Seyfedīn, Chogā Seyfodīn, Choghā Seyfodīn, Chougha Seifoddin, Choughā Seyfodīn, ChoughāSeyfodDīn, Chūb-e Safīdān, and Chūgheh Safīdain) is a village in Chahar Cheshmeh Rural District of Kamareh District in Khomeyn County, Markazi province, Iran.

== Demographics ==
=== Population ===
At the time of the 2006 National Census, the village's population was 854 in 221 households. The following census in 2011 counted 794 people in 232 households. The 2016 census measured the population of the village as 671 people in 217 households, the most populous in its rural district.
