= Suk Qazqan =

Village in Markazi province, Iran

Suk Qazqan Persian: سوكقزقان
- Village
- Location within Iran
- Coordinates: 33°43′13″N 49°39′32″E
- Country: Iran
- Province: Markazi
- County: Khomeyn
- District: Kamareh
- Rural District: Chahar Cheshmeh

Population (2016)
  - Total: 389
- Time zone: UTC+3:30 (IRST)

Suk Qazqan (Persian: سوكقزقان) (Note: Also romanized as Sūk Qazqān and Sūk-e Qazqān; also known as Sūk, Sūk Qarqān, Sūke-e Qazqan, Sukhegāzgaon, and Sūkhgākūn) is a village in Chahar Cheshmeh Rural District of Kamareh District in Khomeyn County, Markazi province, Iran.

== Demographics ==
=== Population ===
At the time of the 2006 National Census, the village's population was 604 in 139 households. The following census in 2011 counted 484 people in 143 households. The 2016 census measured the population of the village as 389 people in 136 households.
