= Hratch Kozibeyokian =

Armenian-American expert on oriental rugs

Hratch Kozibeyokian Հրաչ Կոզիբեյոկյան
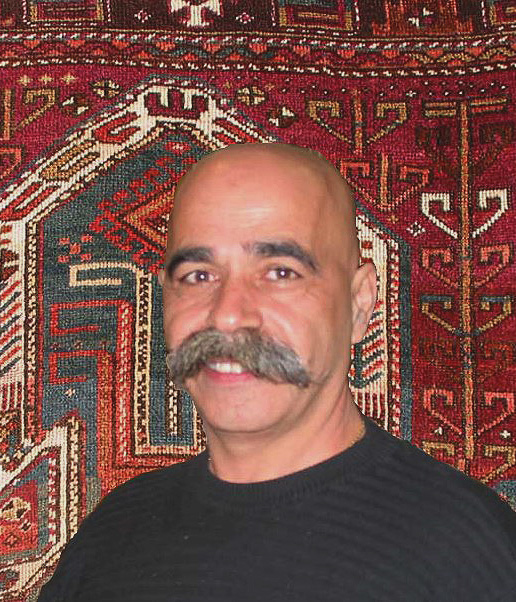
- Born: Kozibeyokian, Hratch; August 12, 1951; Aleppo, Syria
- Occupations: Master Weaver, Restorer, Designer
- Spouse: Mira Assadourian
- Writing career
- Language: Armenian, English
- Notable awards: Best oriental rug restorer of Los Angeles

Hratch Kozibeyokian (Armenian: Հրաչ Կոզիբեյոկյան; born August 12, 1951) is an Armenian American expert on oriental rugs.

== Biography ==
Kozibeyokian was born in 1951 in Aleppo, Syria, in a family of Armenian genocide survivors. He was raised in Lebanon in a family which hailed from a long line of traditional Armenian master weavers of carpets (from Aintab and Zeitun).

In 1977 he came to the United States to join his father's oriental rug business. In 1979 he settled in Los Angeles and earned a B.A. in Cultural Anthropology from Chapman University. In 1990 he established KO'Z'Craft, a workshop that restores and conserves hand-woven antique textiles and carpets, whose works were exhibited in a gallery in West Hollywood. Mr. Kozibeyokian holds an extensive collection of rare Armenian and Caucasian hand woven rugs and textiles. He has organized countless exhibitions, lectures and has participated in many symposia, geared towards bringing awareness to the importance of the ancient Armenian weaving heritage.

Kozibeyokian was the first to launch a specific academic course on the history of traditional Armenian rugs within the Armenian Studies Program at the California State University, Northridge (CSUN). He has also lectured on the history and significance of Armenian rug weaving culture in a number of high schools and colleges. He is the author of numerous articles on the history and techniques of Armenian weaving that have been published in various publications. Kozibeyokian's expertise and keen knowledge of Armenian and oriental rugs has been valued by countless connoisseurs of antique rugs.

In 2014, Kozibeyokian, as the representative of the Armenian Rugs Society, was invited to present the display of President Calvin Coolidge's Armenian Orphan Rug at the White House.

In 1998, Kozibeyokian joined the Armenian Rugs Society (ARS) and has been elected to serve on its board many times.

In 2005, the Los Angeles Magazine, has dubbed him the "rug doctor", and named him as the "best oriental rug restorer of Los Angeles".

In 2015 Hratch Kozibeyokian was unanimously elected by the board of the Armenian Rugs Society to serve as its president.
