= Kukah, Markazi =

Village in Markazi province, Iran

Kukah Persian: كوكه
- Village
- Location within Iran
- Coordinates: 33°39′34″N 50°03′32″E
- Country: Iran
- Province: Markazi
- County: Khomeyn
- District: Kamareh
- Rural District: Khorram Dasht

Population (2016)
  - Total: 544
- Time zone: UTC+3:30 (IRST)

Kukah (Persian: كوكه) (Note: Also romanized as Kookeh, Kūkah, and Kūkeh) is a village in Khorram Dasht Rural District of Kamareh District in Khomeyn County, Markazi province, Iran.

== Demographics ==
=== Population ===
At the time of the 2006 National Census, the village's population was 286 in 77 households. The following census in 2011 counted 423 people in 135 households. The 2016 census measured the population of the village as 544 people in 173 households.
