= Sikh Youth Symposium =

Logo of the Sikh Youth Alliance of North America, which organizes the symposium

The Sikh Youth Symposium is an annual public speaking and debate competition held for the Sikh youth across the United States of America and Canada, encouraging them to reconnect with their cultural foundations and religious roots. Organized by the Sikh Youth Alliance of North America (SYANA), the competition is open to children between the ages of 6 and 22 and has three levels—locals, regionals, and internationals. The children are divided into five groups, on the basis of age, with the first four groups competing by way of prepared speeches and the final group engaging in a stimulating discussion focused on a yearly chosen topic. The competition aims to ensure that the next generation of Sikh leaders remains firmly connected to the basic principles of its religion.

== Format ==
The competition is divided into five age groups: Group I (6–8 years old), Group II (9–10 years old), Group III (11–13 years old), Group IV (14–17 years old, and Group V (16–22 years old). Each age group is assigned a different book on the Sikh religion each year by a committee of regional and international conveners. This committee also generates a list of three questions for each age group that are to be answered in the participants' speeches. The answers to these questions can be found, in large part, in the book assigned; however, some reflection and critical thinking by the participants is necessary in answering the questions, as well.

The local level of competition is usually held within a gurdwara. The winners in each group of the competition advance to the regional level, which usually involves four to five gurdwaras in close geographical proximity. The winners in each group of this competition advance to the international level, which is hosted in a different city across the United States of America and Canada every year.

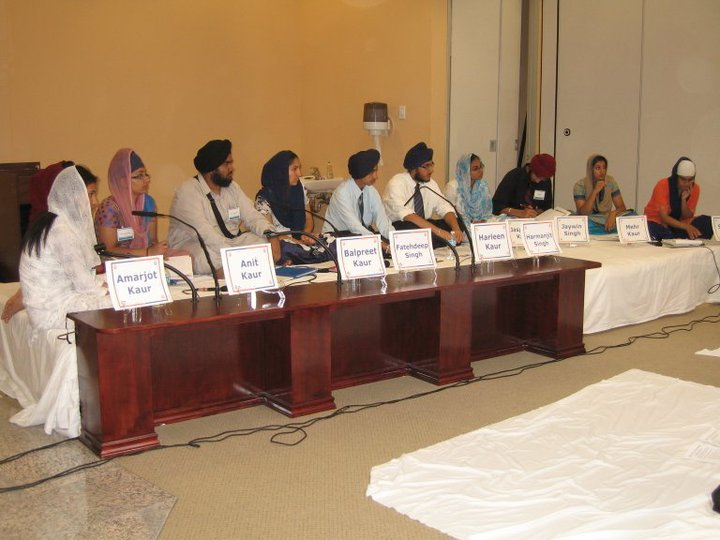
Group V competitors at the 2010 International Sikh Youth Symposium in Toronto, Ontario

At the local, regional, and international level for groups I - IV, the competition is held in the form of a prepared speech. Group I's allotted time is 5 minutes, Group II's allotted time is 6 minutes, Group III's allotted time is 6 minutes, and Group IV's allotted time is 7 minutes. A panel of three judges assesses the speeches, weighing 60% of a participant's score on his/her content (answering the questions) and the remaining 40% on the participant's presentation (style and delivery, eye contact, voice and diction, language, and overall effectiveness). For Group V, the local and regional competition is usually a prepared speech, graded in the same manner as groups I-IV. However, the international competition for Group V is a debate between the winners from each region. The debate consists of four phases—opening statements, questions from the moderator, closing statements, and questions from the sangat—and typically lasts three hours.

Whereas the local and regional competition are completed in a day in April/May, the international competition spans the entire first weekend of August. Finalists and their families arrive in the host city on a Thursday, checking in that evening and receiving their informational packets for the weekend. Also on Thursday evening, the regional and international conveners meet to decide on the books and international host city for the next year. On Friday morning, the competition for Group I, Group II, and Group III is typically held before langar and Group IV's competition is held after langar. On Friday evening, participants and their families enjoy a social activity, ranging from a tour of the city and its notable landmarks to a fun activity, such as bowling or attending a rodeo. On Saturday, the marquee event of the Symposium—the Group V debate—is held throughout the morning and early afternoon. In the evening, participants and their families enjoy a formal banquet to honor the Symposium's participants. On Sunday morning, the awards ceremony is held and, after langar, the Symposium is officially complete.

== List of Past International Symposiums ==
=== 2002 ===
Detroit, Michigan

=== 2003 ===
Toronto, Ontario

=== 2004 ===
Atlanta, Georgia

=== 2005 ===
Boston, Massachusetts

=== 2006 ===
Seattle, Washington

=== 2007 ===
Bakersfield, California

=== 2008 ===
Dallas, Texas (Akaljot Gurdwara and Sikh Temple of North Texas)

=== 2009 ===
Detroit, Michigan (Singh Sabha of Michigan and Madison Heights Gurdwara)

==== Books ====
Group	Book	Author/Publisher
1	Supreme Sacrifice of Young Souls - The Martyrdom of the Younger Sahibzadas	Professor Jagdish Singh
2	Sikhism	Sikh Missionary College, Ludhiana
3	Teaching Sikh Heritage to the Youth - Lessons Learnt Vol. 2	Dr. Gurbakhsh Singh
4	Sundri	Bhai Sahib Bhai Vir Singh
5	When a Tree Shook Delhi - The 1984 Carnage and its Aftermath	Mr. Manoj Mitta and Harvinder Singh Phoolka

=== 2010 ===
Toronto, Ontario

==== Winners ====
Group	First place	Second place	Third place
1	Mehr Kaur (IL/MO)	Simran Kaur (Georgia)	Simran Preet Kaur (Khalsa School)
2	Jaslina Kaur (Seattle, Washington)	Harchint Singh (Midwest)	Gurjit Kaur (Khalsa School)
3	Arjan Singh (Niagara Falls)	Manun Singh (Dallas, Texas)	Sehaj Singh (Georgia)
4	Jasmeet Kaur (Toronto, Ontario)	Tejasvir Singh (Georgia)	Gurpartap Singh (Seattle, Washington)
5	Jaywin Singh (Dallas, Texas)	Jaskirat Kaur (Boston, Massachusetts)	Satprit Kaur (Seattle Washington)

=== 2011 ===
Seattle, Washington

==== Books ====
Group	Book	Author/Publisher
1	Basic Knowledge of Sikhism	Sikh Missionary College, Ludhiana
2	The Sikh Sakhis	Dr. Gurbakhsh Singh
3	Banda Singh Bahadur	Sikh Missionary College, Ludhiana
4	The Message of Gurbani	Sikh Missionary College, Ludhiana
5	Shabad Guru and False Gurudom	Sikh Missionary College, Ludhiana

==== Winners ====
Group	First place	Second place	Third place
1			
2	Simran Kaur (GA)		
3			
4			
5		Robby Singh (CA)	

=== 2012 ===
==== Books ====
Group I: Warrior Princess I by Harjit Singh Lakhan

Group II: Warrior Princess II by Harjit Singh Lakhan

Group III: Khalsa Generals by Dr. Gurbakhsh Singh

Group IV: Martyrs - The Pride of Sikhs by Sikh Missionary College, Ludhiana

Group V: Panth Dardiyo Kuchh Karo by Sikh Missionary College, Ludhiana

==== Winners ====
Group	First place	Second place	Third place
1	Sehaj Kaur (TX)	Kiren Kaur (MA)	Tegbir Singh (ON)
2	Ravkiran Kaur (TX)	Simranpreet Kaur (ON)	Kimenjot Kaur (ON)
3	Jaslina Kaur (OH)	Simran Kaur (MA)	Simran Kaur (GA)
4	Jeewant Kaur (ON)	Jaagrit Kaur (PA)	Harbir Singh (MI)
5	Japman Kaur (ON)	Tejasvir Singh (GA)	Mehr Kaur (MA)

=== 2013 ===
SEWA gurudwara Atlanta, Georgia

==== Books ====
Group I: Supreme Sacrifices of Young Souls by Jagdish Singh

Group II: Why Am I A Sikh? by Sikh Missionary College, Ludhiana

Group III: Sikh Way of Life by Sikh Missionary College, Ludhiana

Group IV: Brief History of Sikh Misls by Sikh Missionary College, Ludhiana

Group V: The Message of Gurbani (Chapters on Anand Sahib, Asa Ki Var, and 'Who is God') by Dr. Gurbaksh Singh

==== Winners ====
Group	First place	Second place	Third place
1	Gurmeher Kaur (NC)	Amrita Kaur (IL)	Harjap Singh (ON)
2	Anitvir Singh (OH)	Ruhani Kaur (TX)	Prabh Noor Singh (OH)
3	Simran Kaur (GA)	Japneet Kaur (OH)	Manjot Singh (ON)
4	Jaslina kaur (WA)	Jasmeen Kaur (ON)	Manmeet Kaur (OH)
5	Harmanpreet Singh (NY)	Balpreet Kaur (OH)	Fatehdeep Singh (GA)

=== 2014 ===
Cleveland, Ohio

==== Books ====
Group I: The Illustrated Story of Chamkaur Sahib: The Martyrdom of Elder Sahibzadas by S. Jagdish Singh

Group II: Selected Episodes from Sikh History - Vol I by Sikh Missionary College, Ludhiana

Group III: We Are Not Symbols by S. Harjot Singh

Group IV: Chithiyan Likh Satguraan Val Paiaan by S. Manohar Singh

Group V: 1984 Pogroms - 30 years

==== Winners ====
Group	First place	Second place	Third place
1	Arshmeet Singh (CT)	Kiren Kaur (MA)	Mehervan Singh (WA)
2	Gurmeher Kaur (NC)	Simranpreet Kaur (ON)	
3			
4			
5	Bani Kaur	Indervir Singh	Triman Singh (ON)

=== 2015 ===
Gurdwara Khalsa Prakash, Windsor, ON

==== Books ====
Group I: Basic Principles of SIkhism, Sikh Missionary College, Ludhiana

Group II: The Warrior Princess: Mata Bhaag Kaur, by S. Harmeet Singh

Group III: Brief History of the Sikh Gurus, Sikh Missionary College, Ludhiana

Group IV: Teaching Sikh Heritage to the Youth (Vol. 1), by Dr. Gurbaksh Singh

Group V: Sikhism: A Universal Message, by Dr. Gurbaksh Singh

==== Winners ====
Group	First place	Second place	Third place
1	Harjot Singh (MI)	Dilzafer Singh (MA)	Sunitvir Singh (OH)
2	Jasjeev Singh (MI)	Dibjot Kaur (NY-NJ)	Taig Singh (Midwest)
3	Gurmeher Kaur (NC)	Navnit Singh (MA)	Ruhani Kaur (TX)
4	Manmeet Kaur (OH)	Simran Kaur (MA)	Ishpreet Singh (MI)
5	Anisha Kaur (Toronto)	Indervir Singh (Bakersfield)	Harsimar Kaur (Renton)

=== 2016 ===
Gurdwara Pittsburgh, Monroeville, PA

==== Books ====
Group I: My Guru's Blessings Book 1, by S. Daljeet Singh, Gyan Khand Media

Group II: My Guru's Blessings Book 2, by S. Daljeet Singh, Gyan Khand Media

Group III: Teaching Sikh Heritage to the Youth (Vol. 2), by Dr. Gurbaksh Singh

Group III: Sahibey Kamaal Guru Gobind Singh, by Daulat Rai

Group V: Sidh Gosht, Sikh Missionary College, Ludhiana

Winners:

Group	First place	Second place	Third place
1	Gurdit Singh (WA)	Saachvir Singh (Niagara Falls)	Pavan Singh (Dallas)
2	Arshmeet Singh (MA)	Simerdeep Singh (GA)	Meharvan Singh (Renton)
3	Sahej Kaur (Renton)	Harjas Kaur (GA)	Gurjot Singh (Toronto)
4	Arushi Kaur (Midwest)	Amneet Singh (MA)	Kirnvir Kaur (Bakersfield)
5	Simranpreet Singh (NY-NJ)	Jagjit Singh (Midwest)	Milanpreet Kaur (Ontario)

=== 2017 ===
Gurdwara Nanak Darbar, Duncan, SC

==== Books ====
Group I: My Guru's Blessings Book 3, by S. Daljeet Singh, Gyan Khand Media

Group II: My Guru's Blessings Book 4, by S. Daljeet Singh, Gyan Khand Media

Group III: Khalsa Generals, by Dr. Gurbaksh Singh

Group IV: Baba Banda Singh Bahadur, Sikh Missionary College, Ludhiana

Group V: Asa Ki Vaar, Sikh Missionary College, Ludhiana

==== Winners ====
Group	First place	Second place	Third place
1	Vigaas Singh (GA)	Kirpal Singh (Boston/CT)	Gurjot Singh (NY-NJ)
2	Aneil Kaur (ON)	Bisan Kaur (GA)	Unnat Singh (NY-NJ)
3	Gurmeher Kaur (NC)	Ruhani Kaur (TX)	Kiran Kaur (MA)
4	Ravkiran Kaur (TX)	Sahib Singh (MA)	Sukhmeet Kaur (ON)
5	Triman Singh (ON)	Ikonkar Kaur (CA)	Harchint Singh (MI)

=== 2018 ===
Khalsa Gurmat Center, Federal Way, WA

==== Books ====
Group I: Warrior Princess Rani Sahib Kaur, by S. Harmeet Singh

Group II: Why Am I a Sikh, Sikh Missionary College, Ludhiana

Group III: Selected Episodes from Sikh History - Part 3, Sikh Missionary College, Ludhiana

Group IV: Guru Granth Sahib: A Supreme Treasure, Dr. Sarup Singh

Group V: (Theme) Importance of Giving Gurgaddi to Guru Granth Sahib

==== Winners ====
Group	First place	Second place	Third place
1	Mananjan Kaur (Ohio)	Eknoor Kaur (Ohio)	Gurbani Kaur (Georgia)
2	Gurdit Singh (Renton)	Pavan Singh (Dallas)	Jasleen Kaur (Toronto)
3	Meharvan Singh (Renton)	Gursimar Singh (Michigan)	Sehaj Kaur (Dallas)
4	Ruhani Kaur (Dallas)	Gurmeher Kaur (North Carolina)	Jasjeev Singh (Toledo)
5	Simran Kaur (Georgia)	Jasvant Singh (Detroit)	Manjot Singh (Toronto)
