= Qurchi Bashi =

City in Markazi province, Iran

Qurchi Bashi Persian: قورچی باشی
- City
- Location within Iran
- Coordinates: 33°40′32″N 49°52′43″E
- Country: Iran
- Province: Markazi
- County: Khomeyn
- District: Kamareh

Population (2016)
  - Total: 1,374
- Time zone: UTC+3:30 (IRST)

Qurchi Bashi (Persian: قورچي باشي) (Note: Also romanized as Qūrchī Bāshī; also known as Khurchbāshi and Qūrchī) is a city in, and the capital of, Kamareh District in Khomeyn County, Markazi province, Iran. It also serves as the administrative center for Khorram Dasht Rural District.

== Demographics ==
=== Population ===
At the time of the 2006 National Census, the city's population was 1,522 in 416 households. The following census in 2011 counted 1,497 people in 446 households. The 2016 census measured the population of the city as 1,374 people in 436 households.
