= Varcheh =

Village in Markazi province, Iran

Varcheh Persian: ورچه
- Village
- Location within Iran
- Coordinates: 33°46′58″N 49°55′45″E
- Country: Iran
- Province: Markazi
- County: Khomeyn
- District: Kamareh
- Rural District: Khorram Dasht

Population (2016)
  - Total: 752
- Time zone: UTC+3:30 (IRST)

Varcheh (Persian: ورچه) (Note: Also romanized as Warcheh; also known as Varchīn, Varchū, and Vāsheh) is a village in Khorram Dasht Rural District of Kamareh District in Khomeyn County, Markazi province, Iran.

== Demographics ==
=== Population ===
At the time of the 2006 National Census, the village's population was 846 in 260 households. The following census in 2011 counted 734 people in 244 households. The 2016 census measured the population of the village as 752 people in 260 households, the most populous in its rural district.
