= Farqas =

Village in Markazi province, Iran

Farqas Persian: فرقس
- Village
- Location within Iran
- Coordinates: 33°38′25″N 49°38′52″E
- Country: Iran
- Province: Markazi
- County: Khomeyn
- District: Kamareh
- Rural District: Chahar Cheshmeh

Population (2016)
  - Total: 231
- Time zone: UTC+3:30 (IRST)

Farqas (Persian: فرقس) (Note: Also known as Fargas and Farghas) is a village in Chahar Cheshmeh Rural District of Kamareh District in Khomeyn County, Markazi province, Iran.

== Demographics ==
=== Population ===
At the time of the 2006 National Census, the village's population was 304 in 76 households. The following census in 2011 counted 259 people in 72 households. The 2016 census measured the population of the village as 231 people in 69 households.
