= Chahar Cheshmeh, Markazi =

Village in Markazi province, Iran

Chahar Cheshmeh Persian: چهارچشمه
- Village
- Location within Iran
- Coordinates: 33°38′16″N 49°39′42″E
- Country: Iran
- Province: Markazi
- County: Khomeyn
- District: Kamareh
- Rural District: Chahar Cheshmeh

Population (2016)
  - Total: 659
- Time zone: UTC+3:30 (IRST)

Chahar Cheshmeh (Persian: چهارچشمه) (Note: Also romanized as Chahār Cheshmeh and Chehār Chashmeh; also known as Chahār Chashmeh-ye Nāz̧em and Qal‘eh-ye Zakī) is a village in Chahar Cheshmeh Rural District of Kamareh District in Khomeyn County, Markazi province, Iran.

== Demographics ==
=== Population ===
At the time of the 2006 National Census, the village's population was 831 in 209 households. The following census in 2011 counted 800 people in 228 households. The 2016 census measured the population of the village as 659 people in 204 households.
