= Lilian, Iran =

Village in Markazi province, Iran

Lilian Persian: ليليان
- Village
- Location within Iran
- Coordinates: 33°41′04″N 49°56′27″E
- Country: Iran
- Province: Markazi
- County: Khomeyn
- District: Kamareh
- Rural District: Khorram Dasht

Population (2016)
  - Total: 477
- Time zone: UTC+3:30 (IRST)

Lilian (Persian: ليليان) (Note: Also romanized as Leylīān and Līlīan; formerly known as Minudasht (مينودشت), also romanized as Mīnūdasht; also known as Leylan, Līlān, and Līrīan) is a village in Khorram Dasht Rural District of Kamareh District in Khomeyn County, Markazi province, Iran.

== Demographics ==
=== Population ===
At the time of the 2006 National Census, the village's population was 782 in 193 households. The following census in 2011 counted 667 people in 206 households. The 2016 census measured the population of the village as 477 people in 166 households.
