= Khorram Dasht Rural District (Khomeyn County) =

Rural district in Markazi province, Iran

Khorram Dasht Rural District Persian: دهستان خرم دشت
- Rural District
- Location within Iran
- Coordinates: 33°44′N 49°52′E
- Country: Iran
- Province: Markazi
- County: Khomeyn
- District: Kamareh
- Established: 1987
- Capital: Qurchi Bashi

Population (2016)
  - Total: 4,888
- Time zone: UTC+3:30 (IRST)

Khorram Dasht Rural District (Persian: دهستان خرم دشت) is in Kamareh District of Khomeyn County, Markazi province, Iran. It is administered from the city of Qurchi Bashi.

== Demographics ==
=== Population ===
At the time of the 2006 National Census, the rural district's population was 6,360 in 1,708 households. There were 5,457 inhabitants in 1,684 households at the following census of 2011. The 2016 census measured the population of the rural district as 4,888 in 1,653 households. The most populous of its 34 villages was Varcheh, with 752 people.

=== Other villages in the rural district ===
- Chahar Taq
- Kukah
- Lakan
- Lilian
- Mohammadiyeh
- Tayyebabad
