= Sikh Phulwari =

Indian Sikh Missionary College magazine

- Type: Monthly magazine
- Format: Print
- Editor-in-chief: Harjit Singh
- Founded: 1980
- Language: Punjabi Hindi
- Headquarters: Ludhiana
- Website: sikhphulwari.com

Sikh Phulwari is a monthly Punjabi and Hindi magazine of the Sikh Missionary College in Ludhiana, India. The magazine aims at the revival of Sikhism and preaching the message of the Sikh Gurus. It is the largest circulating Sikh religious monthly, with 65,000 copies circulating worldwide.

== History ==
Sikh Phulwari was started in Punjabi in August 1980. Other sources claim it started being published as a quarterly in 1977. The Hindi edition of the magazine was launched later.
