= Armenian Orphan Rug =

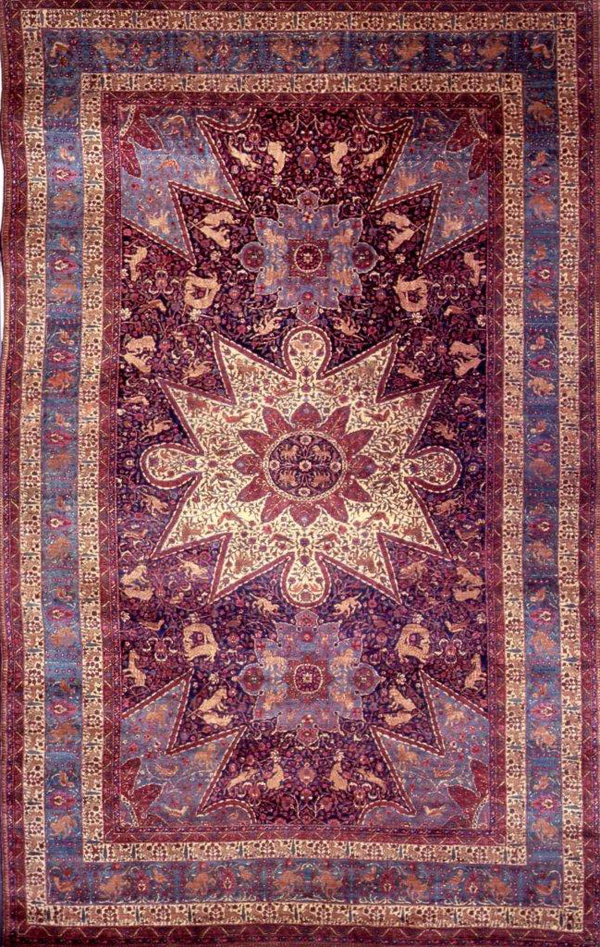
The Armenian Orphan Rug, also known as the Ghazir Orphans' Rug

The Armenian Orphan Rug, also known as the Ghazir Orphans' Rug, is an Armenian styled carpet woven by orphans of the Armenian genocide in Ghazir, Lebanon. The carpet took eighteen months to make and was eventually shipped to the United States where it was given to President Calvin Coolidge as a gift in 1925. It was returned by the Coolidge family to the White House in 1982. Its most recent public display was in November 2014 at the White House Visitors' Center as part of the exhibition "Thank you to the United States: Three Gifts to Presidents in Gratitude for American Generosity Abroad".

== History ==
Due to the Armenian genocide, thousands of orphans and refugees were resettled in the Middle East and placed in orphanages throughout the region. One hundred thousand orphans were assisted by Near East Relief, an American-led relief organization. An orphanage run by Near East Relief in Ghazir, Lebanon, housed many such orphans. In the early 1920s, as a token of appreciation for Near East Relief having protected them, four hundred orphaned girls wove a carpet over the course of 18 months. It was intended as a gift to the United States, and was formally presented to President Calvin Coolidge on December 4, 1925. A label on the back of the rug reads, "In Golden Rule Gratitude to Coolidge". This is a reference to the "Golden Rule" campaign: each year, on the first Sunday in December, people in the United States were asked to eat only a one-course meal and contribute the money saved to the Near East Relief.

US President Calvin Coolidge (left) receiving the rug from John H. Finley as a gift from the Armenian orphans

The gift of the rug received nationwide coverage. Coolidge remarked in a letter to the vice-president of Near East Relief, "The rug has a place of honor in the White House where it will be a daily symbol of goodwill on earth". Coolidge displayed the rug in the White House's Blue Room. After his presidential term ended in 1929, the carpet was taken to his home in Northampton, Massachusetts. The rug lay in the living room of his house until his death in 1933, after which Mrs. Coolidge kept the rug in her home in Northampton until her death in 1957. After a period in storage, the Coolidge family returned the rug to the White House in 1982, where it was placed in storage, not on public display.

== Design ==
The carpet contains designs that may depict scenes from the Adam and Eve story. The rug measures 11 feet 7 inches by 18 feet 5 inches (3.53 m by 5.61 m), and contains over four million hand-woven knots. The rug features lions, unicorns, eagles, and birds as part of its overall design. In the middle of the carpet is a medallion-shaped design.

== Exhibition ==
The Armenian Orphan Rug was removed from storage in 1984 and 1995. In 1995, it was temporarily removed from the storage room of the White House to show it to Vartoohi Galezian, one of its original weavers, and her family. However, it wasn't publicly displayed.

In January 2013, Paul Michael Taylor, director of the Smithsonian Institution's Asian cultural history program, held preliminary discussions with White House curator William G. Allman about the possibility of displaying the rug at the Smithsonian on December 16, 2013, as part of an event sponsored by the Armenian Rugs Society and the Armenian Cultural Foundation, which would include a book launch for Hagop Martin Deranian's President Calvin Coolidge and the Armenian Orphan Rug. The proposal was later backed by a letter signed by a bipartisan group of 33 U.S. Congressmen supporting the removal of the rug from storage. But on September 12, Taylor cancelled the event, citing the White House's decision to decline the requested loan of the rug as the reason.

The White House had not offered an explanation to Taylor for its refusal to lend the carpet, and Taylor did not want to speculate on the reason. However others speculated that the decision not to loan the carpet was fear of negative reaction from Turkey. US Congressman Adam Schiff (D-California) said in an interview, "It's hard for me to reach any conclusion but that they don't want to offend Turkey. If that's their motivation, that's completely unacceptable". The Armenian National Committee of America linked the refusal to loan the carpet to President Barack Obama's position on the Armenian genocide, citing his refusal to officially recognize the Genocide, his blocking of Congressional legislation to mark the event, his Solicitor General's opposition to efforts in U.S. courts to allow American citizens to pursue Genocide-era property claims, and his administration's sending of senior officials to speak at events organized by Armenian genocide deniers while refusing to attend Congressional observances of the Genocide.

On November 12, 2013, the White House responded to the allegations. Laura Lucas Magnuson, spokeswoman for the National Security Council, said, "Displaying the rug for only half a day in connection with a private book launch event, as proposed, would have been an inappropriate use of U.S. government property, would have required the White House to undertake the risk of transporting the rug for limited public exposure, and was not viewed as commensurate with the rug's historical significance". The White House also said that the decision to keep the rug in storage "does not preclude" the possibility that it might be displayed sometime in the future.

The Armenian Orphan Rug was displayed at the White House Visitor Center in November 2014 as part of the temporary exhibition "Thank you to the United States: Three Gifts to Presidents in Gratitude for American Generosity Abroad". The exhibition displayed three objects gifted to America as a response to American aid after international catastrophes: the Armenian Orphan Rug; a French vase presented to President Herbert Hoover after World War I; and Japanese cherry and dogwood blossoms encased in acrylic, given to President Obama. The display caption for the rug was criticized for avoiding mention of the Armenian genocide, and failing to explain "who these orphans were, where they were from, why were they orphaned, who made them orphans, or what was done (or not done) to set things right".

== Legacy and recognition ==
President Calvin Coolidge:

This beautiful rug woven by children in Lebanon has been received. This, their expression of gratitude for what we’ve been able to do for this country for their aid, is accepted by me as a token of their goodwill to the people of the United States who have assisted in the work of the Near East Relief. Please extend to these orphans my thanks and the thanks of the vast number of our citizens whose generosity this labor of love is intended to acknowledge. The rug has a place of honor in the White House where it will be a daily symbol of goodwill on earth.

Congressman Frank Pallone:

The White House has taken an important step in recognizing historical accuracy by displaying the Armenian orphan rug. The rug was presented to President Coolidge on behalf of the Armenian people to honor the U.S. assistance provided during the Armenian genocide. As a result, this cultural treasure has become a symbol of the strong and historic ties between the United States and Armenia. I sent a letter to President Obama urging him to allow this unique gift to go on display in a place where all Americans could view it. I believe that past attempts to keep this rug behind closed doors were fueled by the Turkish government’s desire to prevent any further dialogue about the Armenian genocide. It is my hope that the rug’s exhibition will facilitate academic discourse and allow the American people to reflect on our positive role during a dark period of history.

Congressman Adam Schiff:

The Ghazir Rug is not just a carpet; it is a tangible connection to the first genocide of the Twentieth Century – a silent, beautiful rebuttal to those who deny the murder of 1.5 million men, woman and children in a campaign of mass murder, forced marches, rape and looting that befell the Armenian people from 1915-23. As the world prepares to commemorate the centennial of the genocide, the Ghazir Rug brings to life the shattered families and the mass inhumanity that was visited upon the Armenian people. And I hope that it can serve to educate a new generation of Americans about one of the great tragedies of history and leads to a redoubling of efforts in 2015 to finally and forever, honor the genocide of the Armenians without equivocation. One hundred years is a long time to wait and the Armenian people should not have to wait any longer. History is replete with tragedy and barbarism, but it is also filled with stories of humanity, courage and faith. The Ghazir Rug embodies all of these and stands as a potent symbol of triumph against evil, our solidarity with the victims of persecution everywhere, and our special bond with the Armenian people.

Congressman Jim Costa:

The Armenian Orphan Rug not only symbolizes the terror and the struggle of the Armenian people, but also their fighting spirit.

Congresswoman Judy Chu:

For the last 10 years, the Armenian American community has fought to get this rug released and displayed to the public. This is only a first step. This story reinforces why Congress must pass a resolution to recognize the Armenian genocide.

Washington Post arts and architecture critic Philip Kennicott:

It's a big rug. It's a beautiful piece. It has on it many images of animals and plants and there is the sense by people who know what these images suggest, that it represents probably the garden of Eden.

== See also ==
- Armenian culture
- Recognition of the Armenian genocide
- Armenian genocide in culture
