= Shirak, Armenia =

Shirak Շիրակ
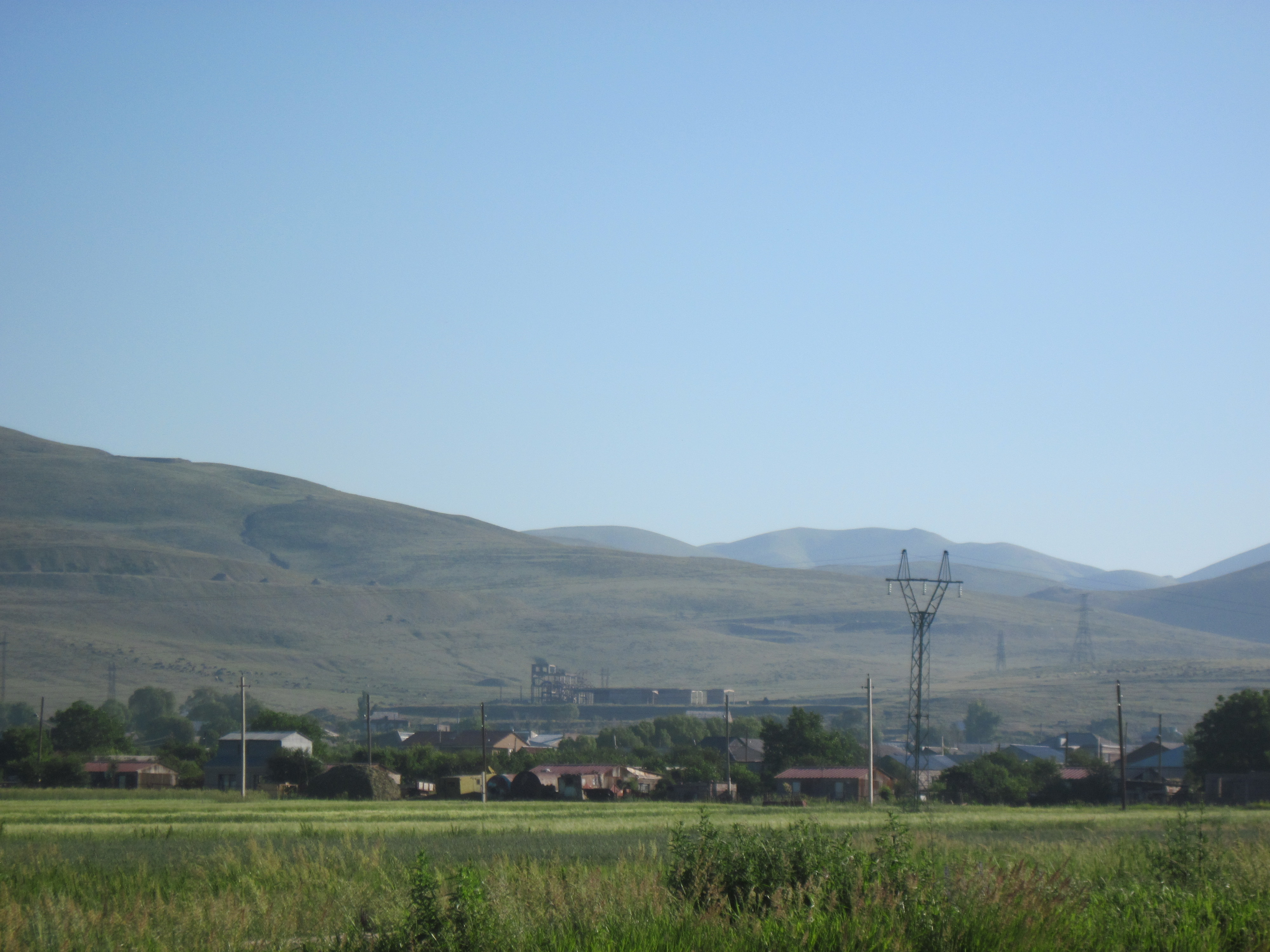

- Location within Armenia Location within Shirak
- Coordinates: 40°50′53″N 43°55′17″E
- Country: Armenia
- Province: Shirak
- Municipality: Akhuryan

Population (2011)
  - Total: 1,153
- Time zone: UTC+4

Shirak (Armenian: Շիրակ) is a village in the Akhuryan Municipality of the Shirak Province of Armenia, belongs to the Marmashen community.

== Demographics ==
Historical population
Year	Pop.	±% p.a.
1831	192	—
1897	1,125	+2.72%
1926	1,158	+0.10%
1939	1,132	−0.17%
1959	847	−1.44%
1970	859	+0.13%
1979	839	−0.26%
1989	548	−4.17%
2001	1,081	+5.82%
2011	1,153	+0.65%
