= Chahar Cheshmeh-ye Olya =

Chahar Cheshmeh-ye Olya چهارچشمه عليا
- Village
- Location within Iran
- Coordinates: 36°17′35″N 59°29′47″E
- Country: Iran
- Province: Razavi Khorasan
- County: Torqabeh and Shandiz
- Bakhsh: Torqabeh
- Rural District: Torqabeh

Population (2006)
  - Total: 172
- Time zone: UTC+3:30 (IRST)
  - Summer (DST): UTC+4:30 (IRDT)

Chahar Cheshmeh-ye Olya (Persian: چهارچشمه عليا, also Romanized as Chahār Cheshmeh-ye ‘Olyā; also known as Chahār Cheshmeh and Chahār Cheshmeh-ye Bālā) is a village in Torqabeh Rural District, Torqabeh District, Torqabeh and Shandiz County, Razavi Khorasan Province, Iran. At the 2006 census, its population was 172, in 40 families.
