= Kukeh, West Azerbaijan =

Kukeh كوكه
- Village
- Location within Iran
- Coordinates: 36°27′56″N 45°57′32″E
- Country: Iran
- Province: West Azerbaijan
- County: Bukan
- Bakhsh: Central
- Rural District: Il Teymur

Population (2006)
  - Total: 173
- Time zone: UTC+3:30 (IRST)
  - Summer (DST): UTC+4:30 (IRDT)

Kukeh (Persian: كوكه, also Romanized as Kūkeh) is a village in Il Teymur Rural District, in the Central District of Bukan County, West Azerbaijan Province, Iran. At the 2006 census, its population was 173, in 29 families.
