= Phulbari, Kailali =

Coordinates: 28°38′N 80°42′E

Phulbari फुलबारी
- Village development committee
- Interactive map of Phulbari
- Country: Nepal
- Province: Sudurpashchim Province
- District: Kailali District

Population (2011)
  - Total: 20,508
- Time zone: UTC+5:45 (Nepal Time)

Phulbari is a village in Dhangadhi sub-metropolitan city and former village development committee in Kailali District in Sudurpashchim Province of Nepal. At the time of the 2011 Nepal census it had a population of 20,508 living in 3,844 individual households.
