= Chahar Cheshmeh Rural District =

Rural district in Markazi province, Iran

Chahar Cheshmeh Rural District Persian: دهستان چهارچشمه
- Rural District
- Location within Iran
- Coordinates: 33°37′N 49°44′E
- Country: Iran
- Province: Markazi
- County: Khomeyn
- District: Kamareh
- Established: 1987
- Capital: Javadiyeh

Population (2016)
  - Total: 4,646
- Time zone: UTC+3:30 (IRST)

Chahar Cheshmeh Rural District (Persian: دهستان چهارچشمه) is in Kamareh District of Khomeyn County, Markazi province, Iran. Its capital is the village of Javadiyeh.

== Demographics ==
=== Population ===
At the time of the 2006 National Census, the rural district's population was 6,852 in 1,763 households. There were 5,727 inhabitants in 1,745 households at the following census of 2011. The 2016 census measured the population of the rural district as 4,646 in 1,609 households. The most populous of its 28 villages was Chaqa Seyf ol Din, with 671 people.

=== Other villages in the rural district ===
- Chahar Cheshmeh
- Domaney
- Farqas
- Khalilabad
- Qaleh Babu
- Suk Qazqan
