= Kamareh District =

District in Markazi province, Iran

Kamareh District Persian: بخش کمره
- District
- Location within Iran
- Coordinates: 33°40′N 49°50′E
- Country: Iran
- Province: Markazi
- County: Khomeyn
- Established: 1997
- Capital: Qurchi Bashi

Population (2016)
  - Total: 10,908
- Time zone: UTC+3:30 (IRST)

Kamareh District (Persian: بخش کمره) is in Khomeyn County, Markazi province, Iran. Its capital is the city of Qurchi Bashi.

== Demographics ==
=== Population ===
At the time of the 2006 National Census, the district's population was 14,734 in 3,887 households. The following census in 2011 counted 12,681 people in 3,875 households. The 2016 census measured the population of the district as 10,908 inhabitants in 3,698 households.

=== Administrative divisions ===
Kamareh District Population
Administrative Divisions	2006	2011	2016
Chahar Cheshmeh RD	6,852	5,727	4,646
Khorram Dasht RD	6,360	5,457	4,888
Qurchi Bashi (city)	1,522	1,497	1,374
Total	14,734	12,681	10,908
RD = Rural District
