= Sikhs =

Religious group

- The Khanda, a common symbol of the Sikhs

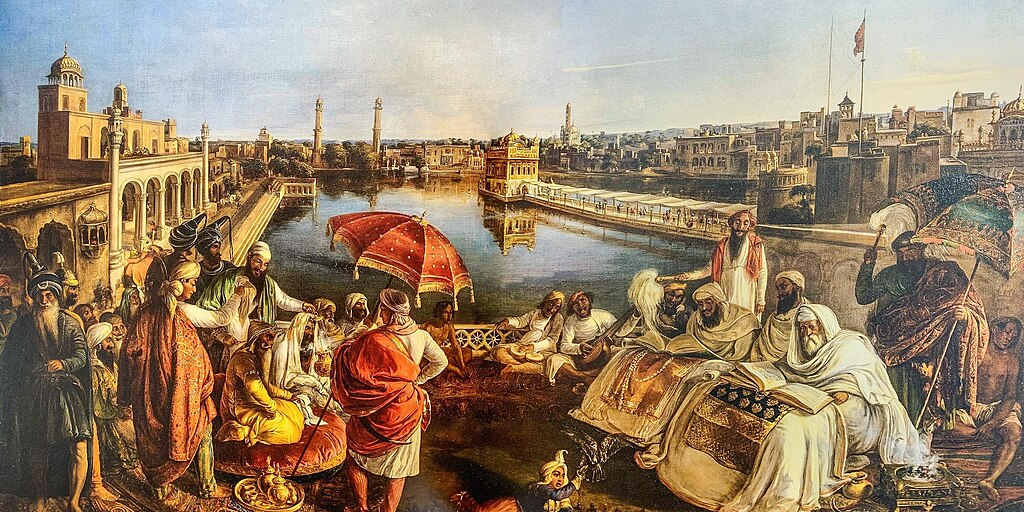
- Painting of Maharaja Ranjit Singh at the Golden Temple, by August Schoefft, c. 1840s–1855

Total population
- c. 25–30 million

Founder
- Guru Nanak

Regions with significant populations
- India: 25 million
- Canada: 771,790
- United Kingdom: 535,517
- United States: 500,000
- Australia: 210,400
- Italy: 210,000
- Malaysia: 130,000
- Thailand: 100,000
- United Arab Emirates: 100,000
- New Zealand: 53,406

Religions
- Sikhism

Scriptures
- Guru Granth Sahib

Languages
- Contemporarily; Modern Punjabi • Hindustani • Pashto • English • French • Italian • Spanish • Dutch; Historically; Punjabi dialects • Khalsa bole • Sant Bhasha (liturgical)

Sikhs (Gurmukhi: ਸਿੱਖ, romanized: Sikkh, Punjabi pronunciation: [sɪkkʰ]) (Note: /sɪk/ SIK or /siːk/ SEEK) are followers of Sikhism, a religion that originated in the late 15th century in the Punjab region of the Indian subcontinent, based on the teachings of Guru Nanak. The term Sikh has its origin in the Sanskrit word śiṣya, meaning 'seeker', 'disciple' or 'student'.

According to Article I of Chapter 1 of the Sikh Rehat Maryada ('code of conduct'), the definition of Sikh is: Any human being who faithfully believes in

1. One Immortal Being
2. Ten Gurus, from Guru Nanak Sahib to Guru Gobind Singh Sahib
3. The Guru Granth Sahib
4. The utterances and teachings of the ten Gurus and
5. The initiation, known as the Amrit Sanchar, bequeathed by the tenth Guru and who does not owe allegiance to any other religion, is a Sikh.

Male Sikhs generally have Singh ('lion') as their last name, though not all Singhs are necessarily Sikhs; likewise, female Sikhs generally have Kaur ('princess') as their last name. These unique last names were given by the Gurus to allow Sikhs to stand out and also as an act of defiance to India's caste system, which the Gurus were always against. Sikhs strongly believe in the idea of sarbat da bhala ('welfare of all') and are often seen on the frontline to provide humanitarian aid across the world.

Sikhs who have undergone the Amrit Sanchar ('baptism by Khanda'), an initiation ceremony, are known as Khalsa from the day of their initiation and they must at all times have on their bodies the five Ks:

1. kesh, uncut hair usually kept covered by a dastār, also known as a turban;
2. kara, an iron or steel bracelet;
3. kirpan, a dagger-like sword tucked into a gatra strap or a kamar kasa waistband;
4. kachera, a cotton undergarment; and
5. kanga, a small wooden comb.

The Punjab region of the Indian subcontinent has been the historic homeland of the Sikhs, having even been ruled by the Sikhs for significant parts of the 18th and 19th centuries. Today, Canada has the largest national Sikh proportion (2.1%) in the world, while the Punjab state in India has the largest Sikh proportion (60%) amongst all administrative divisions in the world. With a population of approximately 25 to 30 million, Sikhs represent about 0.3% to 0.4% of the total world population in 2024. Many countries, such as Canada and the United Kingdom, recognise Sikhs as a designated religion on their censuses and, as of 2020, Sikhs are considered as a separate ethnic group in the United States. The UK also considers Sikhs to be an ethno-religious people, as a direct result of the Mandla v Dowell-Lee case in 1982.

== History ==
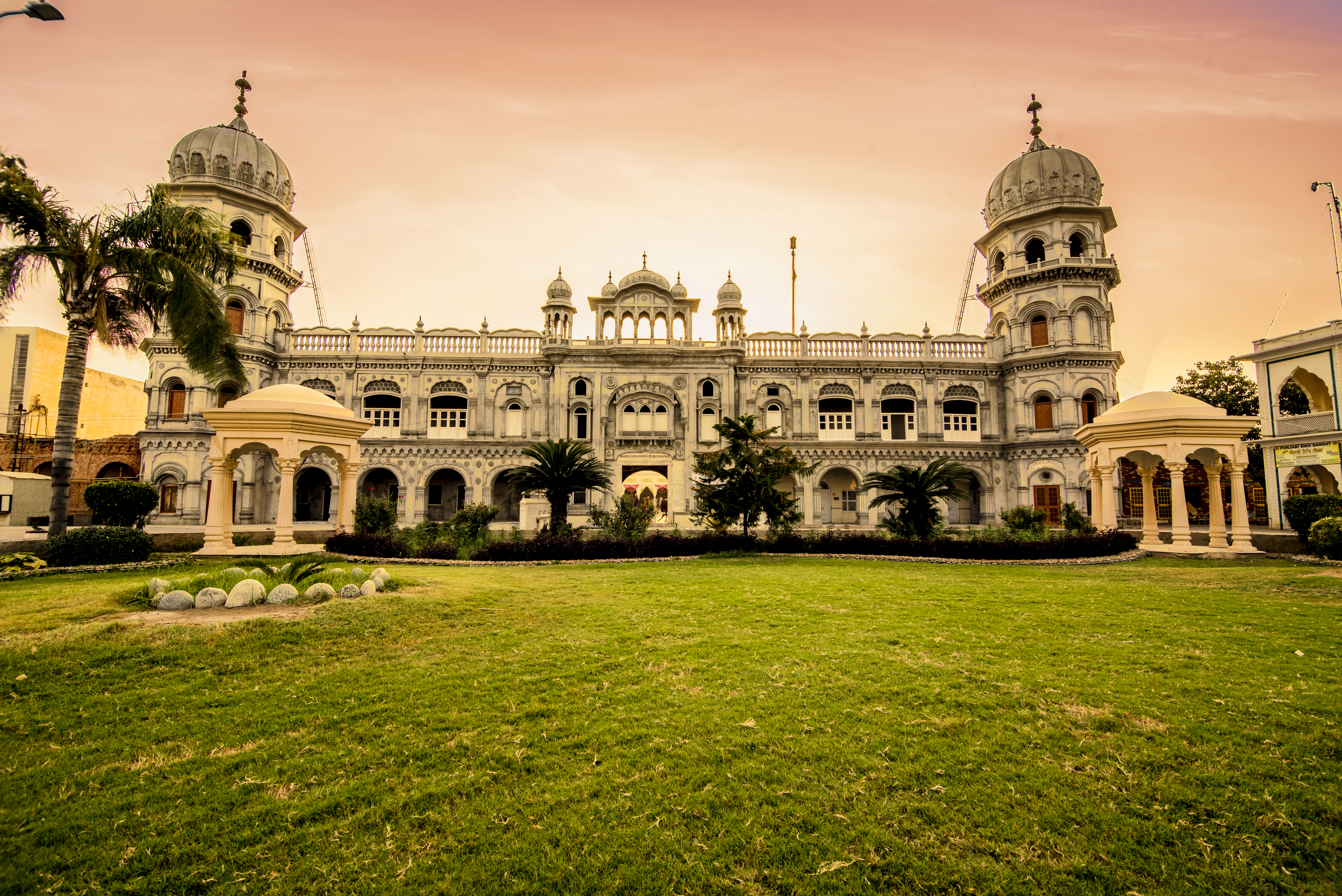
Gurdwara Janam Asthan, the birthplace of Guru Nanak

Guru Nanak (1469–1539), the founder of Sikhism, was born in a Hindu Khatri family to Mehta Kalu and Mata Tripta in the village of Talwandi, present-day Nankana Sahib, near Lahore. Throughout his life, Guru Nanak was a religious leader and social reformer. However, Sikh political history may be said to begin in 1606, with the death of the fifth Sikh guru, Guru Arjan. Religious practices were formalised by Guru Gobind Singh on 30 March 1699, when the Guru initiated five people from a variety of social backgrounds known as the Panj Piare ('beloved five'), to form a collective body of initiated Sikhs known as the Khalsa ('pure').

The early followers of Guru Nanak were Khatris, but later a large number of Jats joined the Sikh faith. Khatris and Brahmins opposed "the demand that the Sikhs set aside the distinctive customs of their castes and families, including the older rituals."

Pashaura Singh analysed references made within the 11th ballad of the Varan of Bhai Gurdas to form a picture of the caste-makeup of the early Sikh community. At the time of the writing the Vaar, the early Sikh community was composed of various castes and backgrounds, such as:

- Khatris (particularly the Sehgal, Ohri, Uppal, Julka, Bhalla, Passi, Khullar, Vohra, Vij, Kapur, Chaddha, Behl, Kohli, Marwah, Mehra, Soni, Jhanjhi, Sodhi, Beri, Nanda, Wadhawan, Tulli and Puri gotras)
- Rajputs (such as Alam Singh Nachna, Bachittar Singh, Baj Singh, Uday Singh (Sikh warrior), Banda Singh Bahadur)
- Brahmins (such as the Bhardwaj gotra)
- Jats (particularly the Randhawa, Khehra, Dhillon and Pannu gotras)
- Tarkhans ('carpenters')
- Lohars ('blacksmiths')
- Nais ('barbers')
- Chhimbas ('cotton-printers')
- Machhis ('water-carriers')
- Dhobis ('washermen')
- Kumhars ('potters')
- Telis ('oil pressers")
- masons
- goldsmiths
- Outcastes (such as Chandals)
- Muslims

The early Sikhs varied widely in their occupations and position in society's hierarchy: some were rich merchants (Seths and Sarrafs), others were heads of villages (Chowdhury), some were labourers, others were enslaved, whilst others still were artisans, craftsmen, shopkeepers or simple peasants.

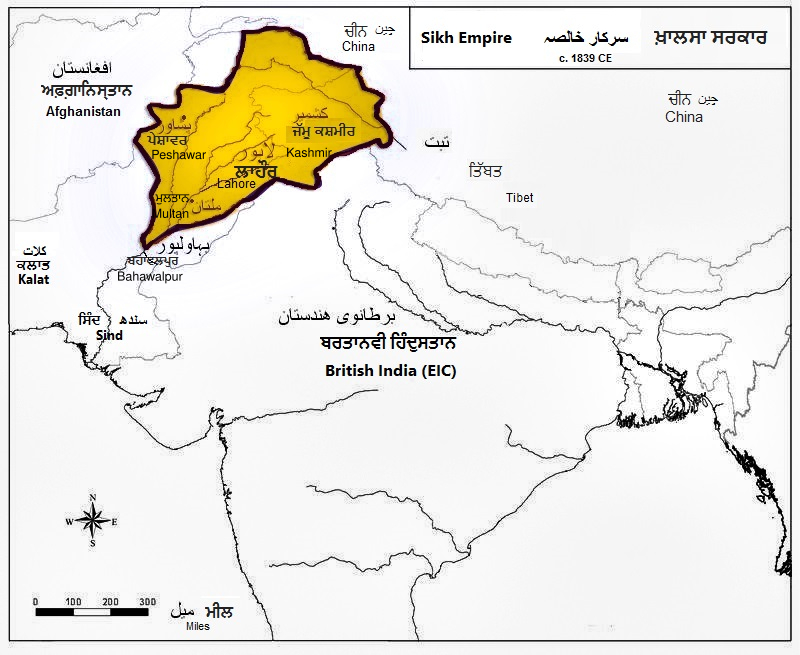
The Sikh Empire at its greatest extent

During the rule of the Mughal Empire in India, two Sikh gurus were martyred. (Guru Arjan was martyred on suspicion of helping in betrayal of Mughal Emperor Jahangir and Guru Tegh Bahadur was martyred by the Mughal Emperor Aurangzeb) As the Sikh faith grew, the Sikhs subsequently militarised to oppose Mughal rule.

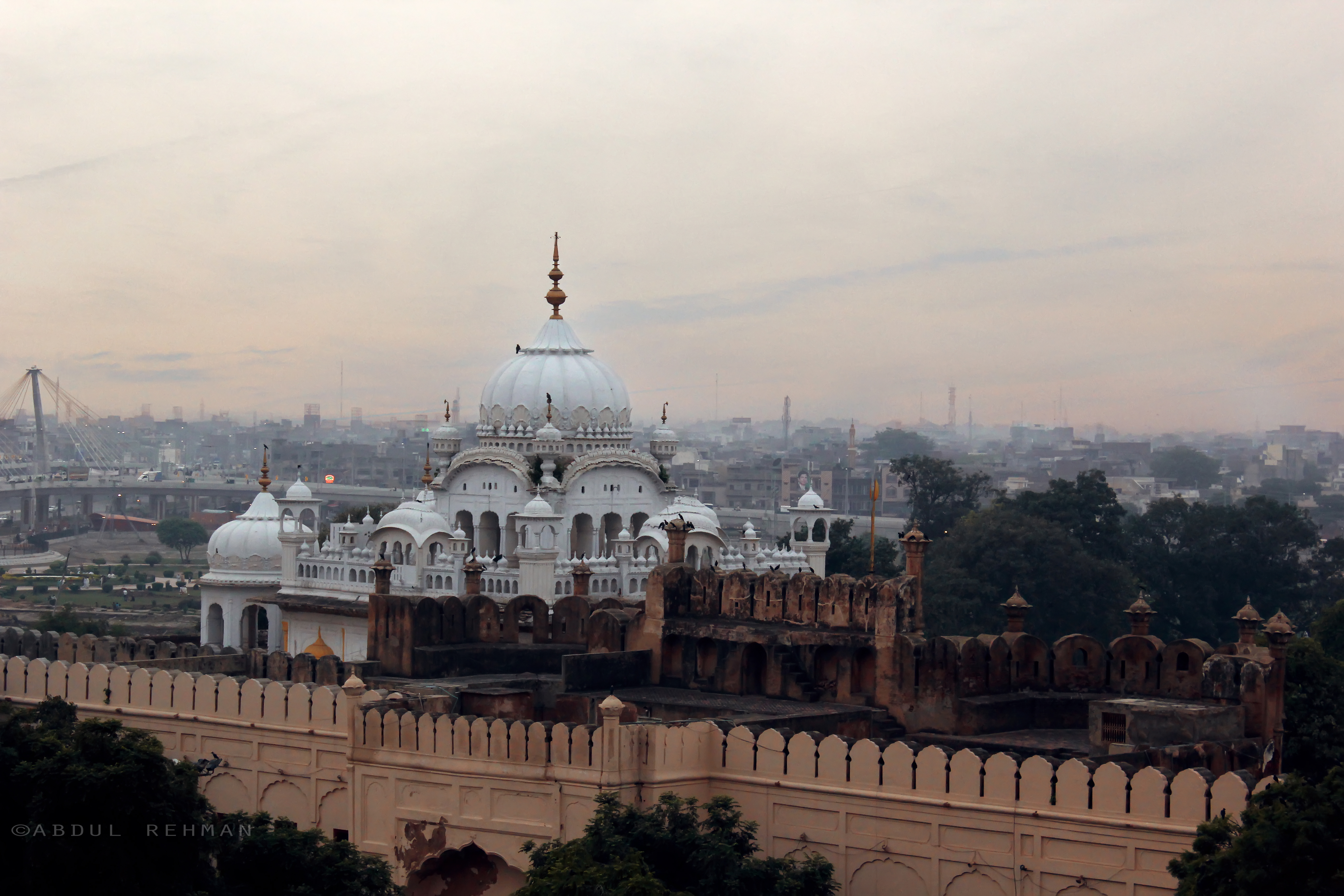
The Samadhi of Emperor Ranjit Singh in Lahore, Pakistan

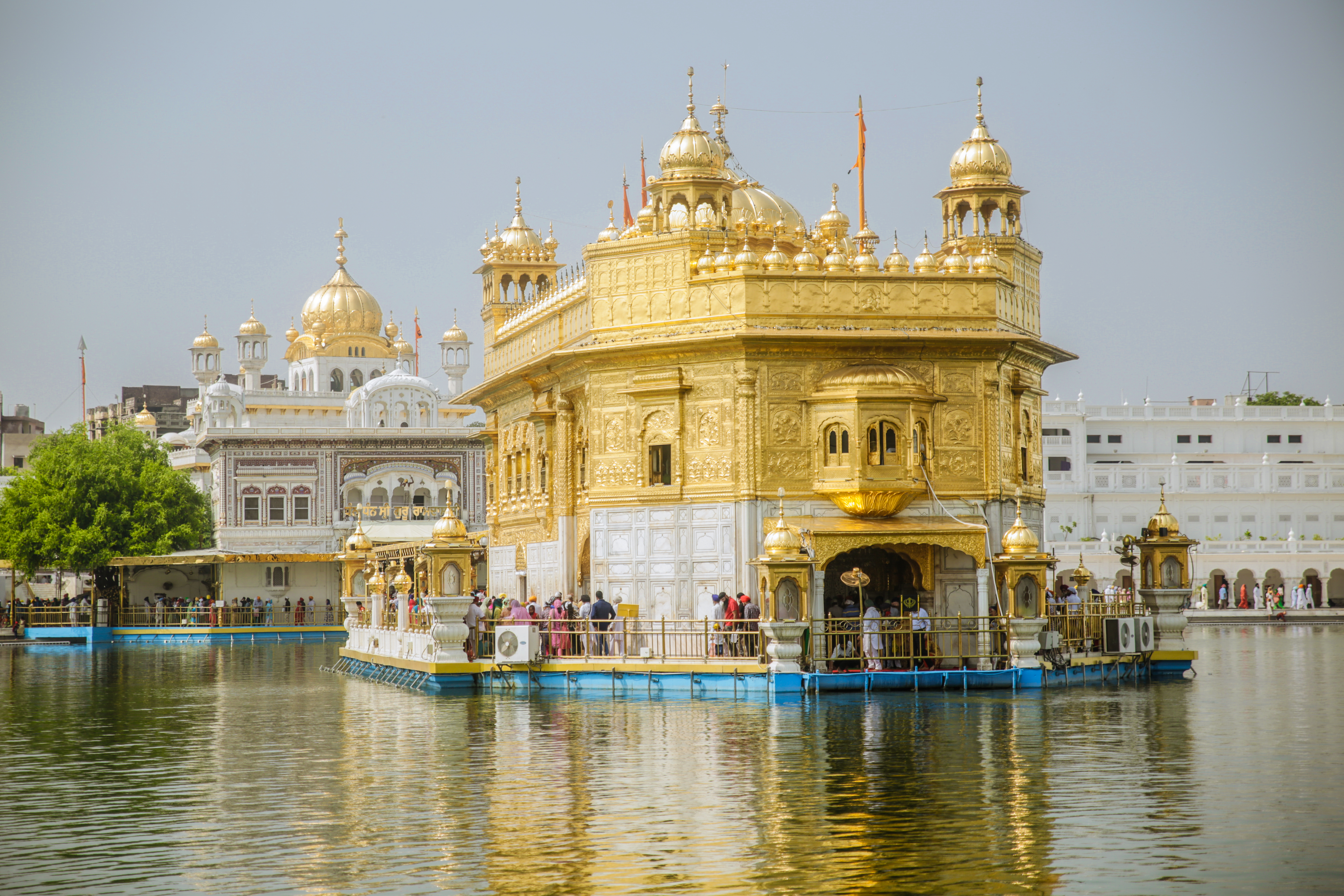
The Golden Temple

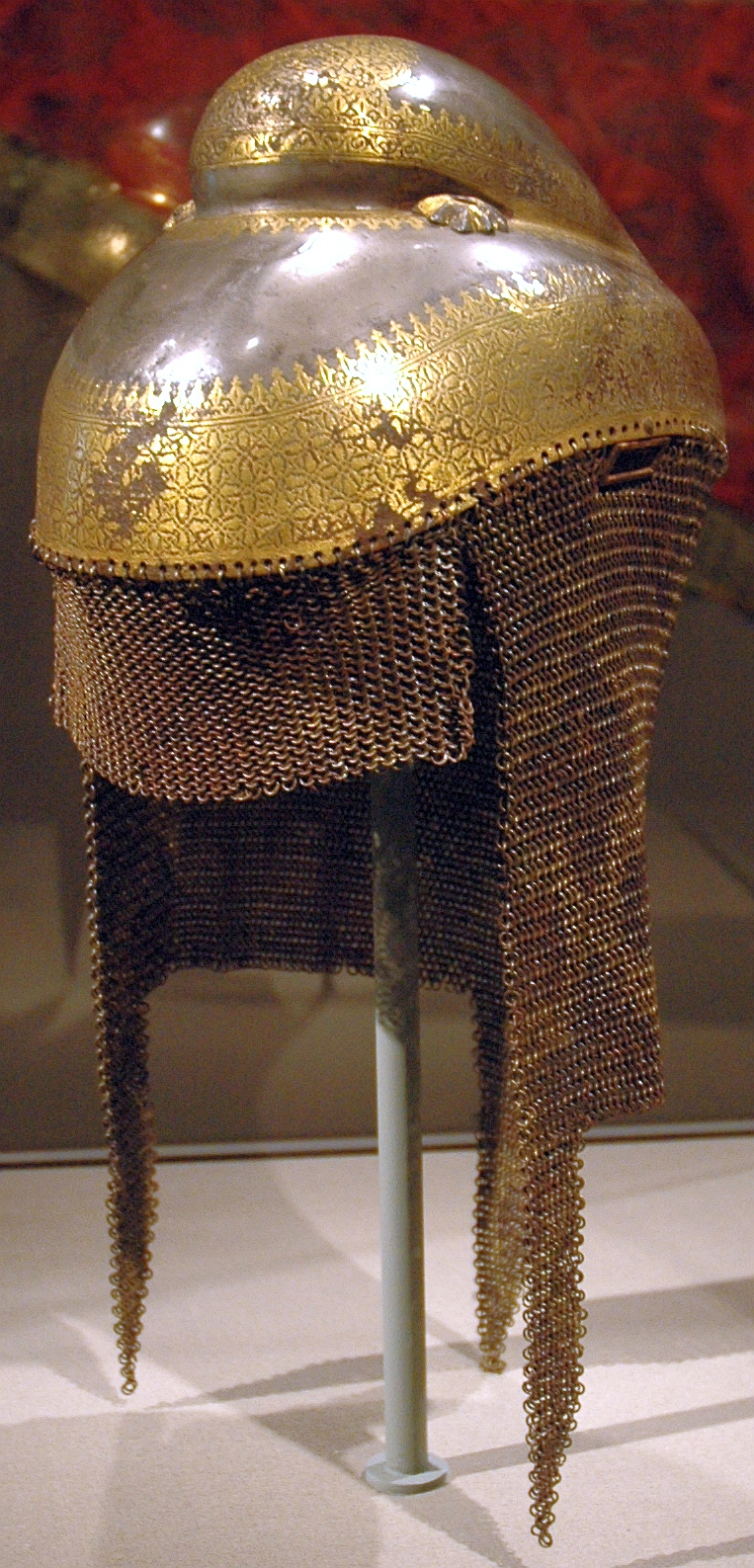
A Sikh Khalsa Army sowar's battle helmet

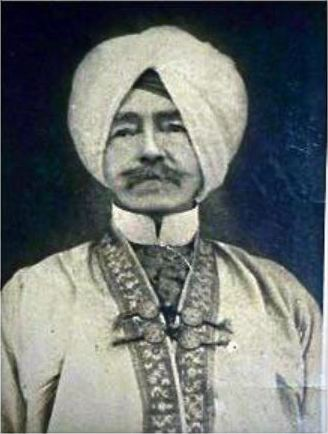
Max Arthur Macauliffe (1841–1913), a senior British administrator who was posted to India during the British rule of Punjab, converted to Sikhism in the 1860s.

After defeating the Afghans and Mughals, sovereign states called Misls were formed under Jassa Singh Ahluwalia. The Confederacy of these states was unified and transformed into the Sikh Empire under Maharaja Ranjit Singh. This era was characterised by religious tolerance and pluralism, including Christians, Muslims and Hindus in positions of power. Its secular administration implemented military, economic and governmental reforms. The empire is considered the zenith of political Sikhism, encompassing Kashmir, Ladakh and Peshawar. Hari Singh Nalwa, the commander-in-chief of the Sikh Khalsa Army in the North-West Frontier, expanded the confederacy to the Khyber Pass.

=== British rule in India ===
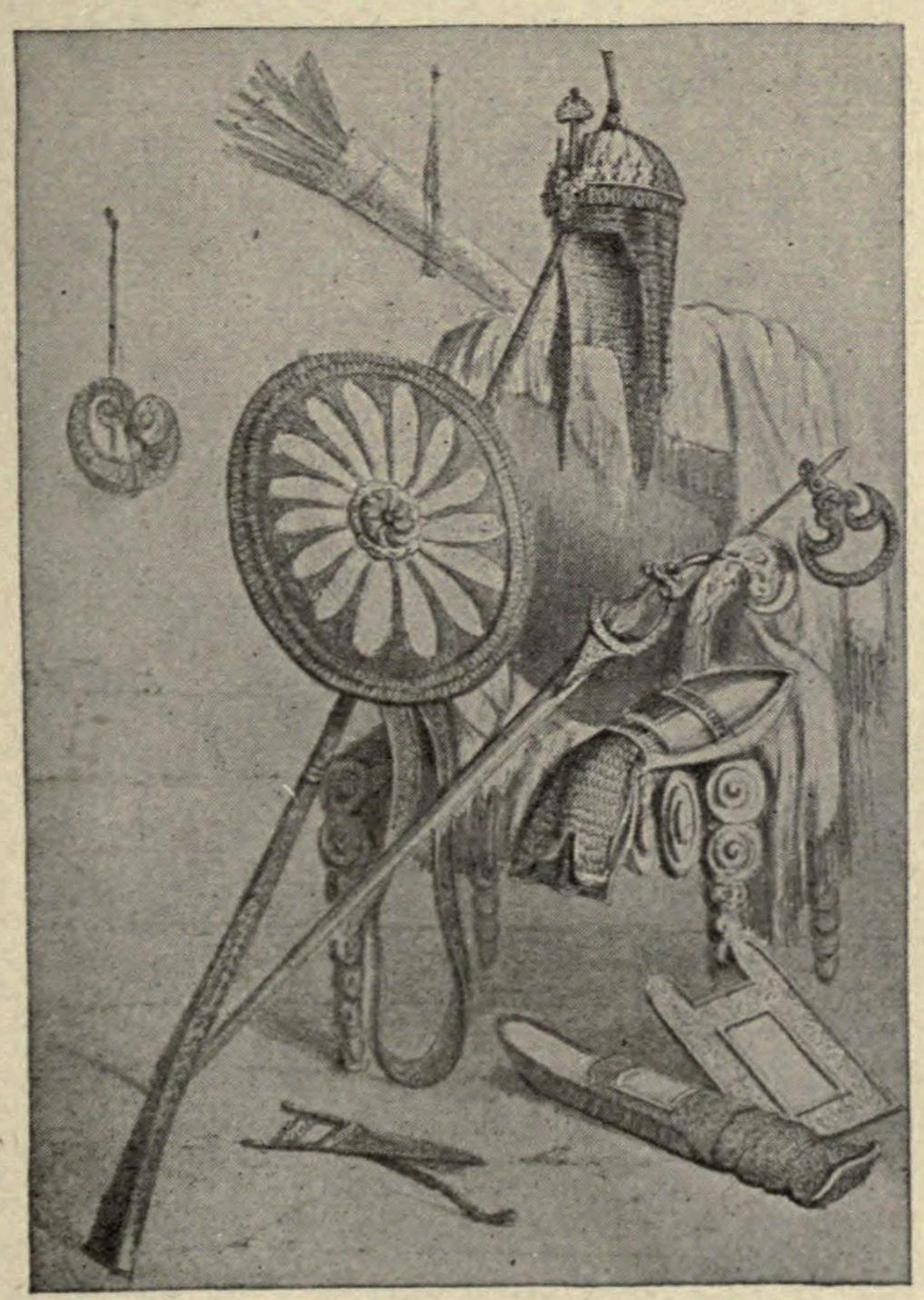
Sikh armour and weapons

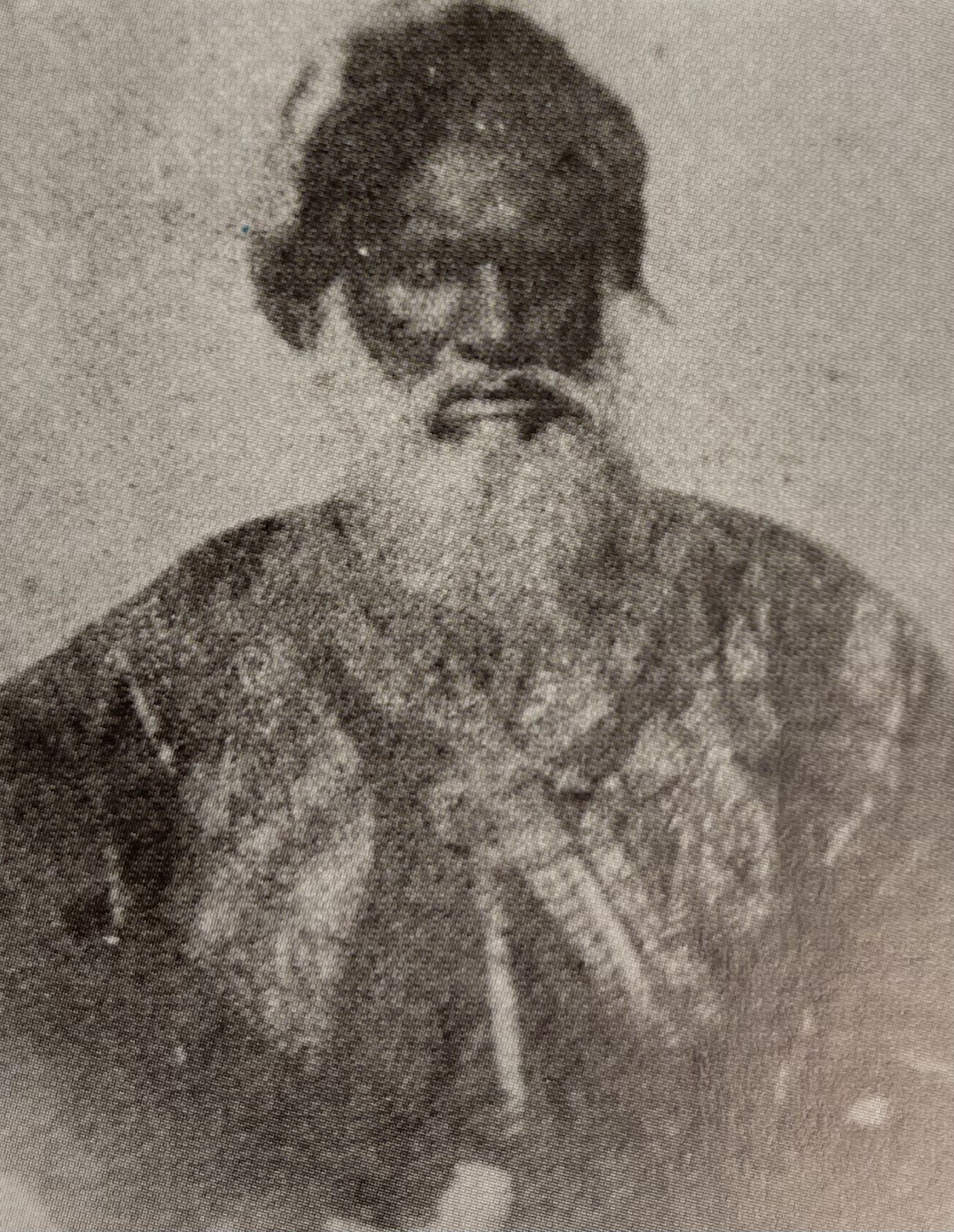
"Sikh Sardar", photograph by John McCosh taken circa 1848–49

After the annexation of the Sikh kingdom by the British, the British Army began recruiting significant numbers of Sikhs and Punjabis. During the 1857 Indian mutiny, the Sikhs stayed loyal to the British, resulting in heavy recruitment from Punjab to the British Indian Army for the next 90 years of the British Raj in colonial India. The distinct turban that differentiates a Sikh from other turban wearers is a relic of the rules of the British Indian Army. The British colonial rule saw the emergence of many reform movements in India, including Punjab, such as the formation of the First and Second Singh Sabha in 1873 and 1879 respectively. The Sikh leaders of the Singh Sabha worked to offer a clear definition of Sikh identity and tried to purify Sikh belief and practice.

The later years of British colonial rule saw the emergence of the Akali movement to bring reform in the gurdwaras during the early 1920s. The movement led to the introduction of Sikh Gurdwara Bill in 1925, which placed all the historical Sikh shrines in India under the control of the Shiromani Gurdwara Parbandhak Committee.

=== Partition and post-Partition ===
At the time of the Indian independence movement, the Sikh ruler of the Kapurthala State fought to oppose the partition of India and advocated for a united, secular country. Sikh organisations, including the Chief Khalsa Dewan and Shiromani Akali Dal led by Master Tara Singh, condemned the Lahore Resolution and the movement to create Pakistan, viewing it as inviting possible persecution, with Akali Dal instead favouring an undivided Azad Punjab as an independent Sikh State or Khalistan, having passed the Sikh State Resolution in 1946. The Sikhs therefore strongly fought against the partition of Punjab. The months leading up to the 1947 partition of Punjab were marked by conflict in the Punjab between Sikhs and Muslims. This caused the religious migration of Punjabi Sikhs and Hindus from West Punjab to the east (modern India), mirroring a simultaneous religious migration of Punjabi Muslims from East Punjab to the west (modern Pakistan).

Following partition, the Government of India had begun to redraw states corresponding to demographic and linguistic boundaries. However, this was not effective in the northern part of the country, as the government reconsidered redrawing states in the north. While states across the country were extensively redrawn on linguistic lines at the behest of linguistic groups, the only languages not considered for statehood were Punjabi, Sindhi and Urdu. Leading to the launch of the Punjabi Suba movement and the presentation for a Punjabi Suba as a policy in April 1948 by Master Tara Singh. Also, on 26 January 1950, Sikh representatives refused to sign the Indian constitution. As Sikhs were recognised as Hindus and Sikhs were not provided with scheduled castes concessions given to Hindu scheduled castes.

The Punjab Suba experienced heavy government crackdown with the Congress Government arresting as many as 21,000 people. Attempted negotiations with Congress-led the agitation to be adjourned twice, though Jawaharlal Nehru continued to reject the demand. On 4 July 1955, government police forces, led by DIG Ashwini Kumar, forced entry into the Golden Temple premises and heavy-handedly arrested protestors and took them into custody, along with the head granthis of the Akal Takht and Golden Temple, volunteer protestors and even cooks of the temple's langar. The Guru Ram Das Serai and Shiromani Akali Dal offices were also raided and batons used and tear gas and shells were fired to disperse the protestors gathered on the periphery of the temple, damaging the periphery and Sarovar, or pool, of the temple. The government stopped volunteers on the way to the Golden Temple and troops were ordered to flag-march through the bazaars and streets surrounding the site. Over 200 protestors were killed, thousands arrested, and thousands, including women and children, were injured.

The Congress government agreed to the Punjab Suba in 1966 after protests and recommendation of the States Reorganisation Commission. The state of East Punjab was later split into the states of Himachal Pradesh, the new state Haryana and current day Punjab. However, there was a growing alienation between Punjabi Sikh and Hindu populations. The latter of which reported Hindi rather than Punjabi as their primary language. The result was that Punjabi-speaking areas were left out of the new state and given to Haryana and Himachal Pradesh resulting in the state of Punjab to be roughly 35,000 square miles smaller than the Punjabi-speaking areas based on pre-1947 census figures. Moreover, the 1966 reorganisation left Sikhs highly dissatisfied, with the capital Chandigarh being made into a shared union territory and the capital of Punjab and Haryana.

In the late 1960s, the Green Revolution in India was first introduced in Punjab as part of a development program issued by international donor agencies and the Government of India. While Green Revolution in Punjab had several positive impacts, the introduction of the mechanised agricultural techniques led to uneven distribution of wealth. The industrial development was not done at the same pace as agricultural development, the Indian government had been reluctant to set up heavy industries in Punjab due to its status as a high-risk border state with Pakistan. The rapid increase in the higher education opportunities without an adequate rise in the jobs resulted in the increase in the unemployment of educated youth.

In 1973, as a result of unaddressed grievances and increasing inequality, the Akali Dal put forward the Anandpur Sahib Resolution. The resolution included both religious and political issues. It asked for recognising Sikhism as a religion and demanded the devolution of power from the Central to state governments. The Anandpur Resolution was rejected by the government as a secessionist document. Thousands of people joined the movement, feeling that it represented a real solution to demands such as a larger share of water for irrigation and the return of Chandigarh to Punjab.

After unsuccessful negotiations, the Dharam Yuddh Morcha ('righteous campaign') was launched on 4 August 1982, by the Akali Dal in partnership with Jarnail Singh Bhindranwale, with its stated aim being the fulfillment of a set of devolutionary objectives based on the Anandpur Sahib Resolution. Indian police responded to protestors with high-handed police methods, creating state repression that affected a very large segment of Punjab's population. Police brutality resulted in retaliatory violence from a section of the Sikh population, widening the scope of the conflict. A "state of chaos and repressive police methods" combined to create "a mood of overwhelming anger and resentment in the Sikh masses against the authorities". This led to Sikh leader Jarnail Singh Bhindranwale gaining prominence and demands of independence gaining currency, even amongst moderates and Sikh intellectuals. In 1982 and early 1983, extrajudicial killings by the police of orthodox Sikh youth in rural areas in Punjab provoked reprisals. Over 190 Sikhs were killed in the first 19 months of the protest movement.

In May 1984, a Grain Roko morcha was planned and to be initiated on June 3 with protestors practising civil disobedience by refusing to pay land revenue, water, or electricity bills and blocking the flow of grain out of Punjab. Indian Prime minister Indira Gandhi launched Operation Blue Star on June 1 prior to the Grain Roko morcha in order to remove Bhindranwale from the Golden Temple. This subsequently led to Gandhi's assassination by her Sikh bodyguards. Her assassination was followed by government-sponsored pogroms against Sikh communities across India and the killing of thousands of Sikhs throughout India. These events triggered an Insurgency in Punjab which would consume Punjab until the early 1990s.

During the day of Vaisakhi in 1999, Sikhs worldwide celebrated the 300th anniversary of the creation of the Khalsa. Canada Post honoured Sikh Canadians with a commemorative stamp in conjunction with the anniversary. Likewise, on 9 April 1999, Indian president K. R. Narayanan issued a stamp commemorating the 300th anniversary of the Khalsa as well.

== Art and culture ==
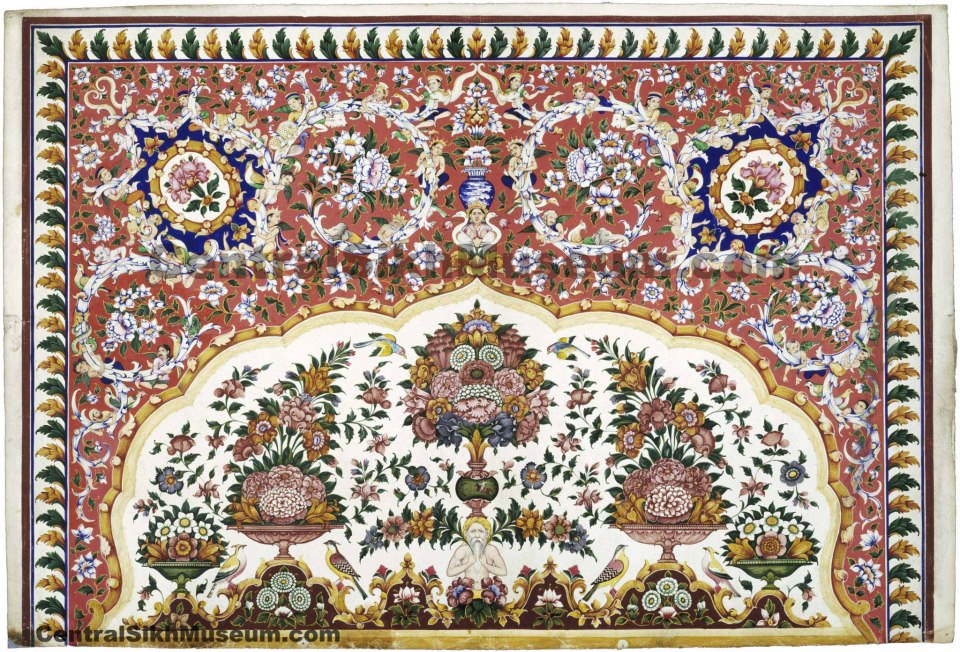
Opaque watercolour-on-paper Nakashi art, about 1880, by an unknown artist from Lahore or Amritsar and used to decorate the walls of Harmandir Sahib

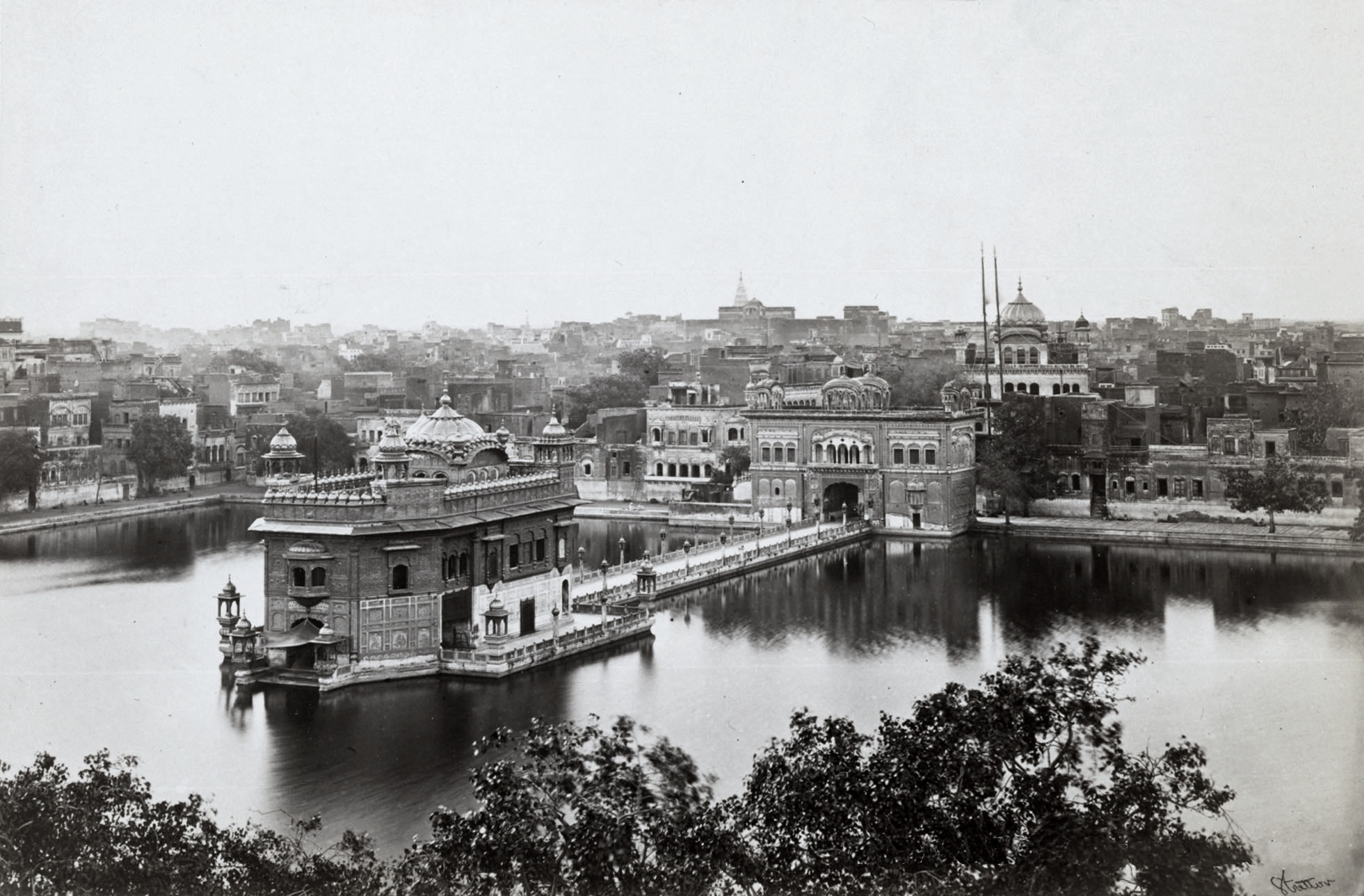
Darbar Sahib, circa 1870

Sikh art and culture are nearly synonymous with that of Punjab, and Sikhs are easily recognised by their distinctive turban (Dastar). Punjab has been called India's melting pot, due to the confluence of invading cultures from the rivers from which the region gets its name. Sikh culture is therefore a synthesis of cultures. Sikhism has forged a unique architecture, which S. S. Bhatti described as "inspired by Guru Nanak's creative mysticism" and "is a mute harbinger of holistic humanism based on pragmatic spirituality". The American non-profit organisation United Sikhs has fought to have Sikh included on the United States census as well, arguing that Sikhs "self-identify as an ethnic minority" and believe "that they are more than just a religion".

During the Mughal and Afghan persecution of the Sikhs during the 17th and 18th centuries, the latter were concerned with preserving their religion and gave little thought to art and culture. With the rise of Ranjit Singh and the Sikh Raj in Lahore and Delhi, there was a change in the landscape of art and culture in Punjab: Hindus and Sikhs could build decorated shrines without the fear of destruction or looting.

The Sikh Confederacy was the catalyst for a uniquely Sikh form of expression, with Ranjit Singh commissioning forts, palaces, bungas (residential places), and colleges in a Sikh style. Sikh architecture is characterised by gilded fluted domes, cupolas, kiosks, stone lanterns, ornate balusters, and square roofs. A pinnacle of Sikh style is Harmandir Sahib (also known as the Golden Temple) in Amritsar.

Sikh culture is influenced by militaristic motifs (with the Khanda the most obvious) and most Sikh artifacts—except for the relics of the Gurus—have a military theme. This theme is evident in the Sikh festivals of Hola Mohalla and Vaisakhi, which feature marching and displays of valor.

Although the art and culture of the Sikh diaspora have merged with that of other Indo-immigrant groups into categories like "British Asian", "Indo-Canadian", and "Desi-Culture", a minor cultural phenomenon that can be described as "political Sikh" has arisen. The art of diaspora Sikhs like Amarjeet Kaur Nandhra and Amrit and Rabindra Kaur Singh (The Singh Twins) is influenced by their Sikhism and current affairs in Punjab.

Bhangra and Giddha are two forms of Punjabi folk dancing which have been adapted and pioneered by Sikhs. Punjabi Sikhs have championed these forms of expression worldwide, resulting in Sikh culture becoming linked to Bhangra (although "Bhangra is not a Sikh institution but a Punjabi one").

=== Painting ===
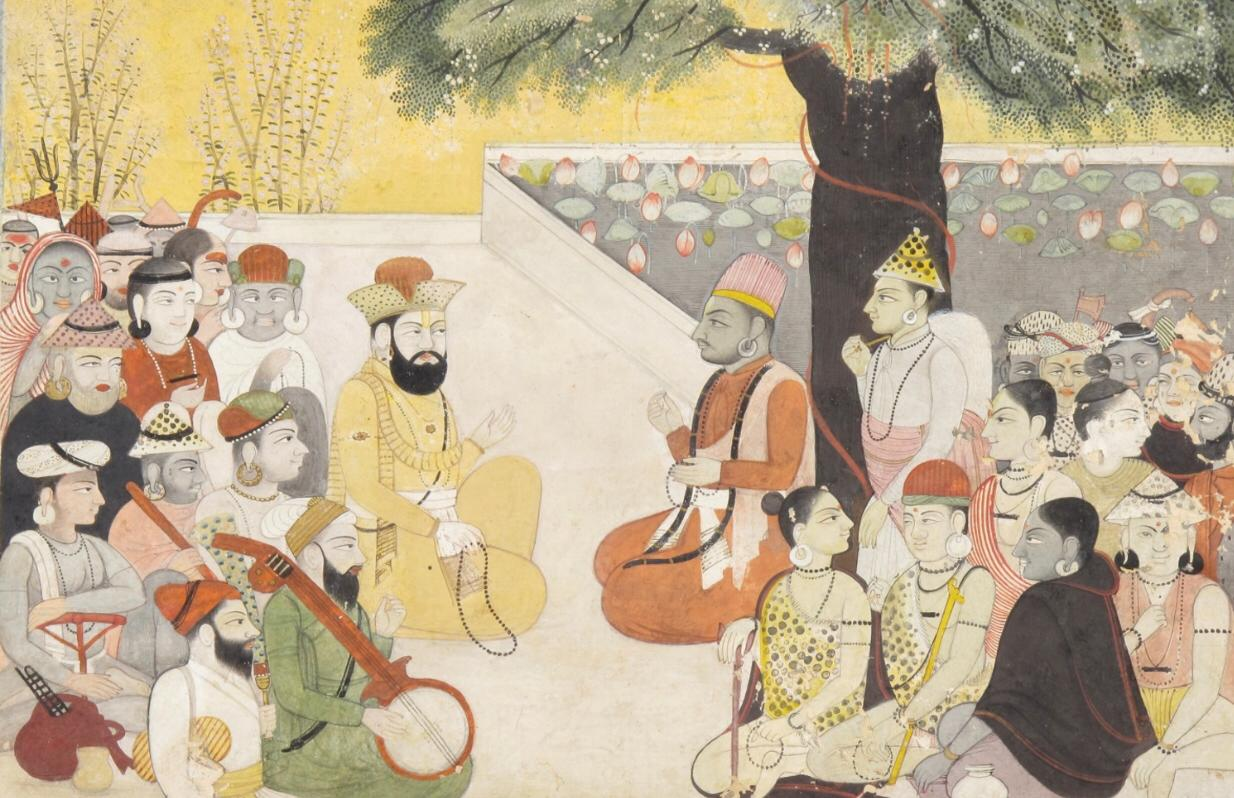
Painting of Guru Nanak with companions Bhai Mardana and Bhai Bala, in debate with the Siddhs

Sikh painting is a direct offshoot of the Kangra school of painting. In 1810, Ranjeet Singh (1780–1839) occupied Kangra Fort and appointed Sardar Desa Singh Majithia as governor of the Punjab hills. In 1813, the Sikh army occupied Guler State and Raja Bhup Singh became a vassal of the Sikhs. With the Sikh kingdom of Lahore becoming the paramount power, some of the Pahari painters from Guler migrated to Lahore for the patronage of Maharaja Ranjeet Singh and his Sardars.

The Sikh school adapted Kangra painting to Sikh needs and ideals. Its main subjects are the ten Sikh gurus and stories from Guru Nanak's Janamsakhis. The tenth Guru, Gobind Singh, left a deep impression on the followers of the new faith because of his courage and sacrifices. Hunting scenes and portraits are also common in Sikh painting.

=== Shrines ===
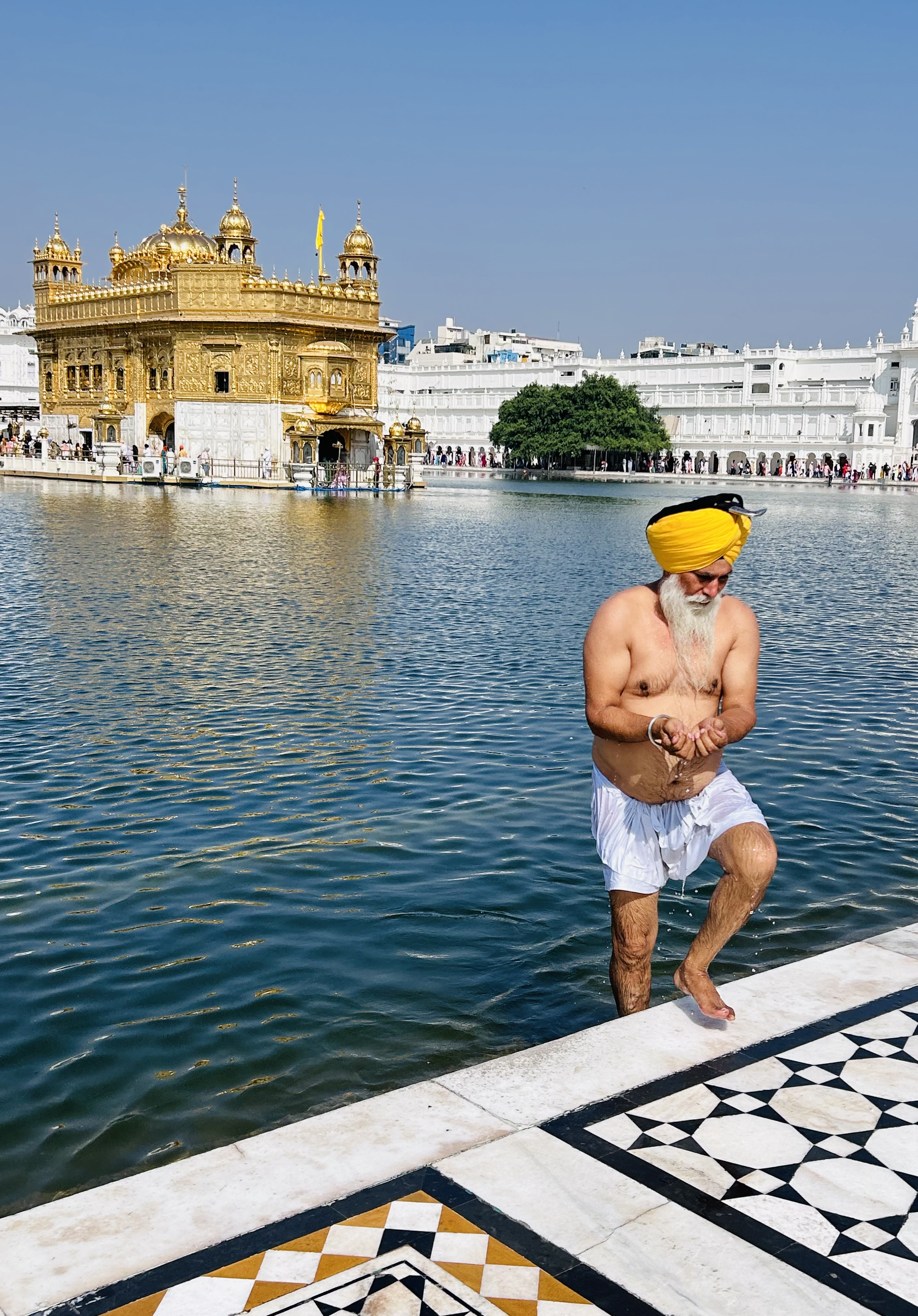
A Sikh at Golden Temple after taking holy bath in Sarovar at Golden Temple

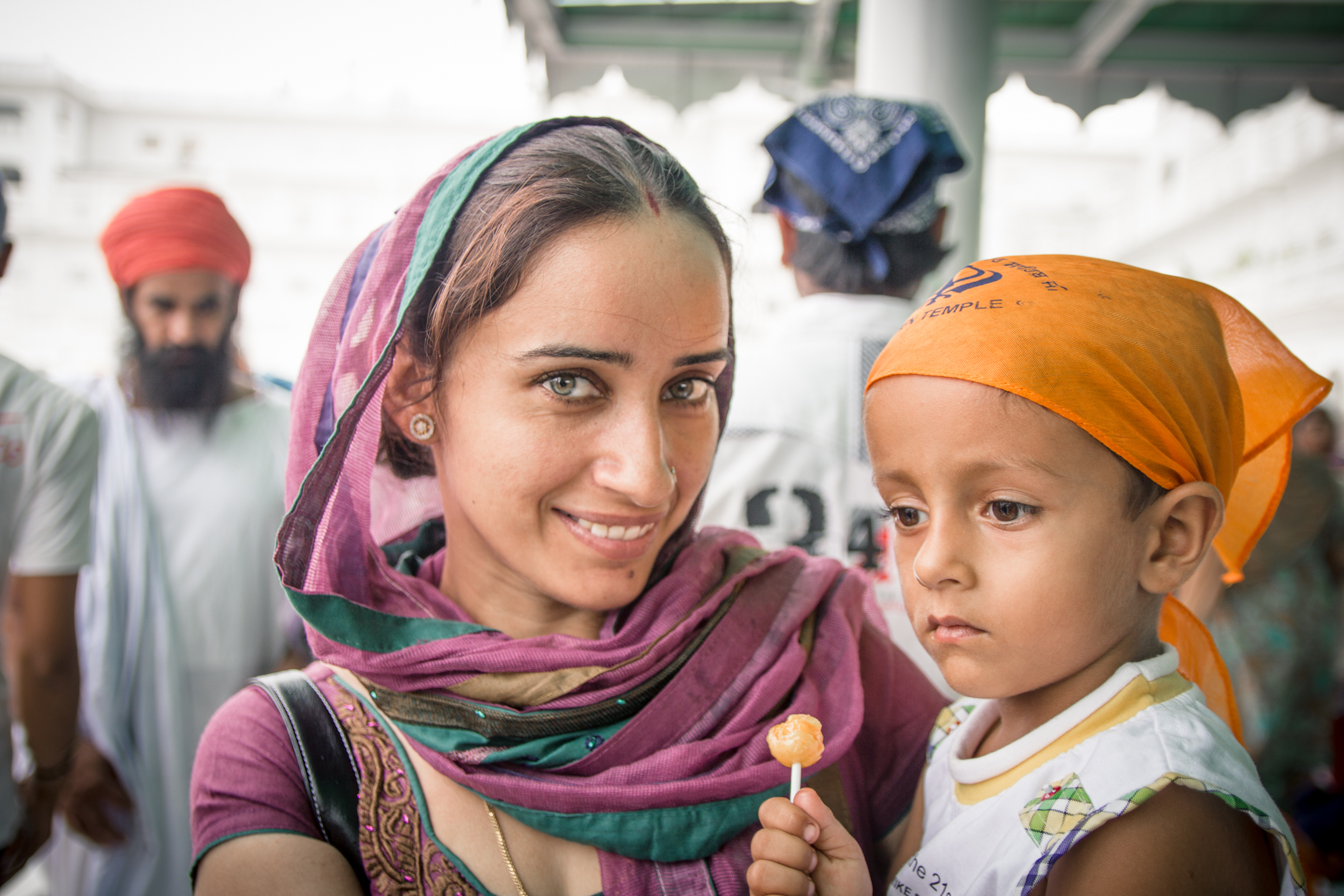
Photograph of a Sikh woman and her son at the Golden Temple in Amritsar, Punjab, India, 9 September 2012

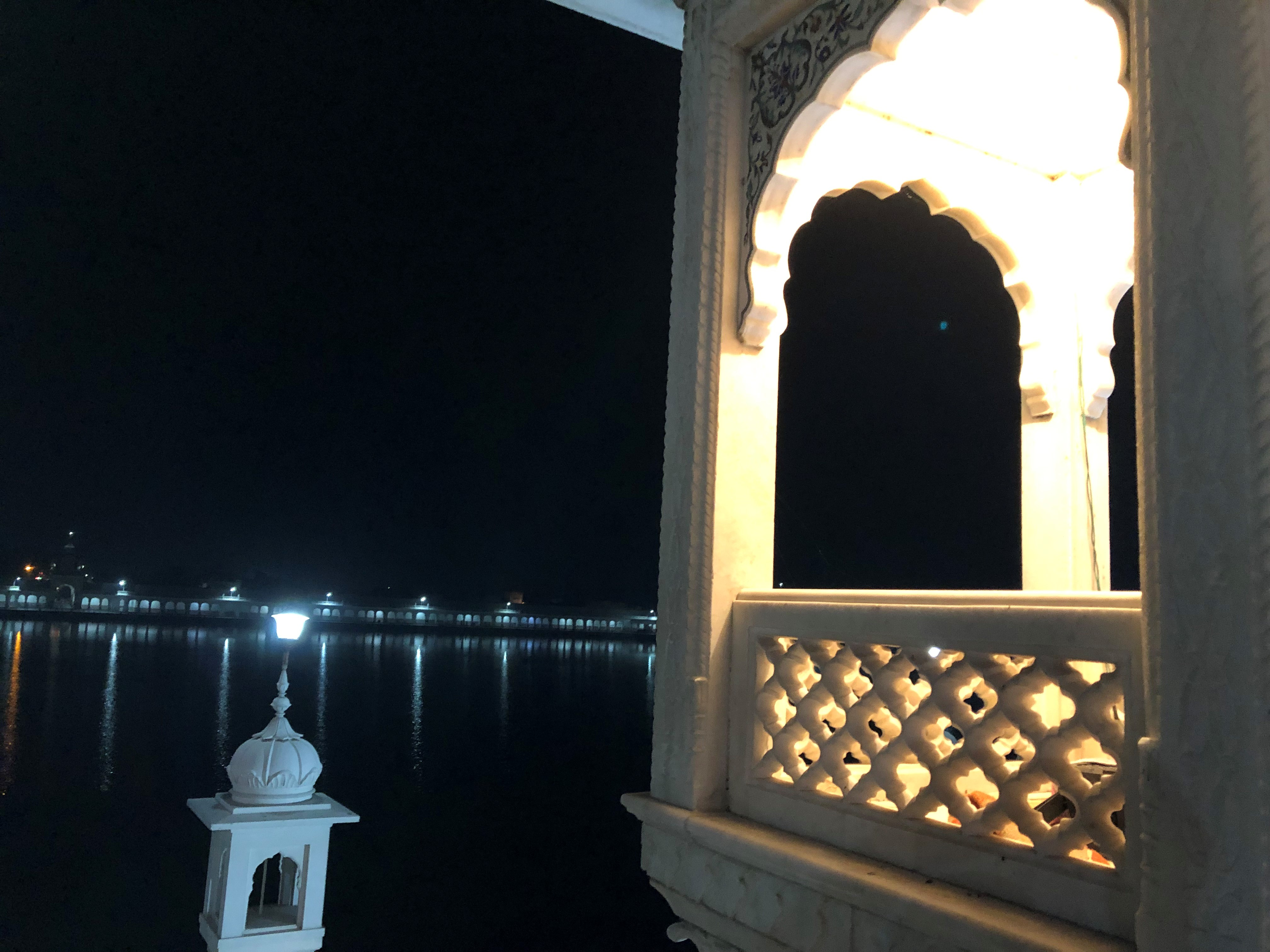
Tarn Taran Sahib – the world's largest sarovar (sacred pool)

There is an old Sikh shrine called 'Prachin Guru Nanak Math' that lies at a small hill just next to Bishnumati bridge at Balaju. Guru Nanak is said to have visited Nepal during his third Udasi while returning from Mount Kailash in Tibet. Nanak is said to have stayed at Balaju and Thapathali in Kathmandu. The Nanak Math shrine at Balaju is managed by the Guru-Ji and the Udasin Akardha, a sect developed by Guru Nanak's son, Sri Chandra.

=== Daily routine ===
From the Guru Granth Sahib:

One who calls themself a Sikh of the Guru, the True Guru, shall rise in the early morning hours and meditate on the Lord's Name. Upon arising early in the morning, he is to bathe and cleanse himself in the pool of nectar. Following the Instructions of the Guru, he is to chant the Name of the Lord, "Har, Har." All sins, misdeeds, and negativity shall be then erased. Then, at the rising of the sun, he is to sing Gurbani; whether sitting down or standing up, he is to meditate on the Lord's Name. One who meditates on my Lord, Har, Har, with every breath and every morsel of food and – that GurSikh becomes pleasing to the Guru's Mind. That person, unto whom my Lord and Master is kind and compassionate – upon that GurSikh, the Guru's Teachings are bestowed. Servant Nanak begs for the dust of the feet of that GurSikh, who himself chants the Naam, and inspires others to chant it.

— Fourth Mehl (Guru Ram Das), Guru Granth Sahib, p. 305

The Sikh Rahit Maryada (Code of Conduct) clearly states that initiated Amritdhari Khalsa Sikhs must recite or listen to the recitation of Japji Sahib, Jaap Sahib, the 10 Sawayyas, Sodar Rehraas and Sohila. Every Sikh is also supposed take the Hukam (divine order) from the Guru Granth Sahib after awakening in the ambrosial hours of the morning (three hours before the dawn) before eating.

=== Five Ks ===
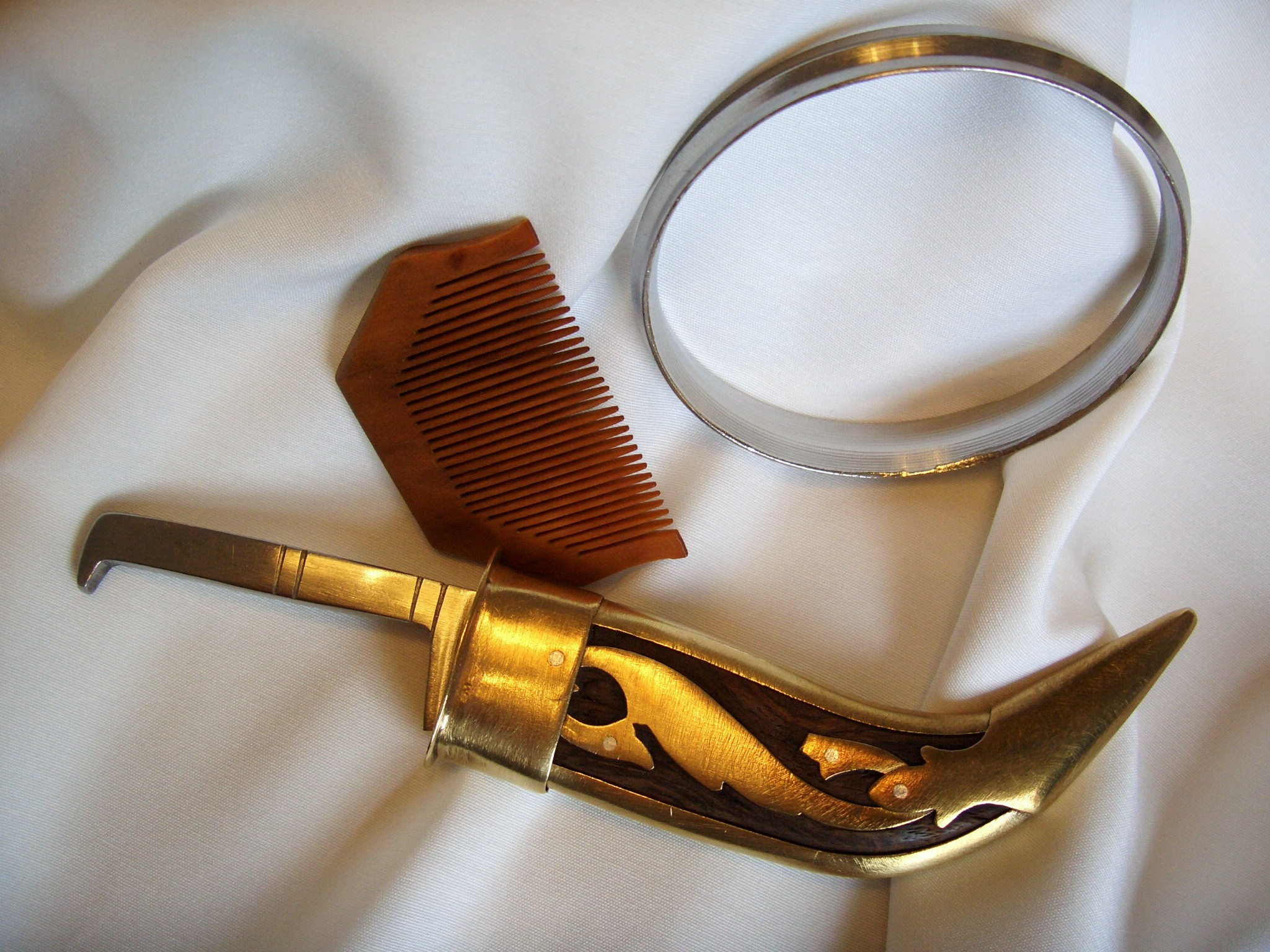
Kanga, Kara and Kirpan: three of the five Sikh articles of faith

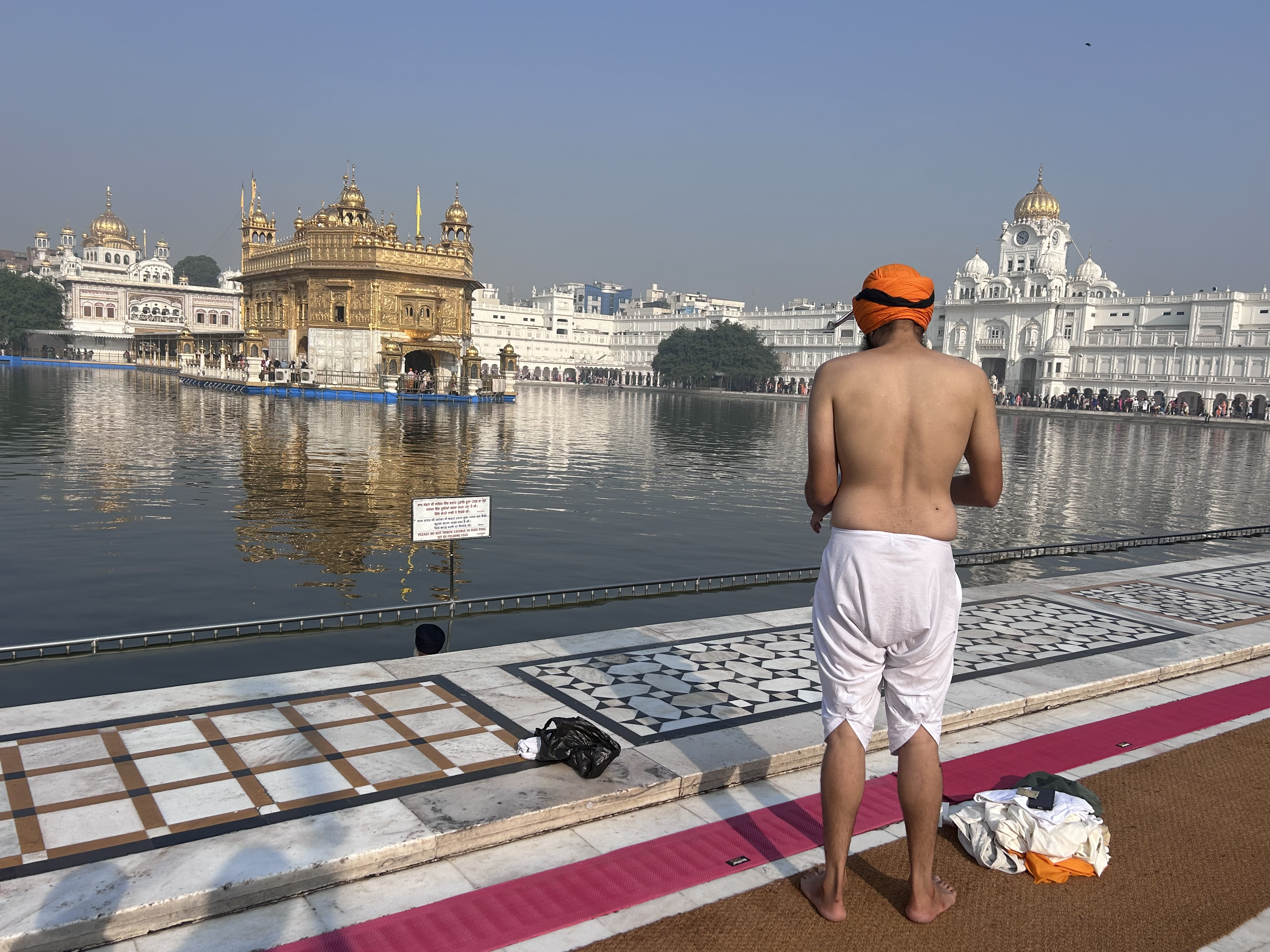
Kachera, one of 5 Ks (items) of Sikhs

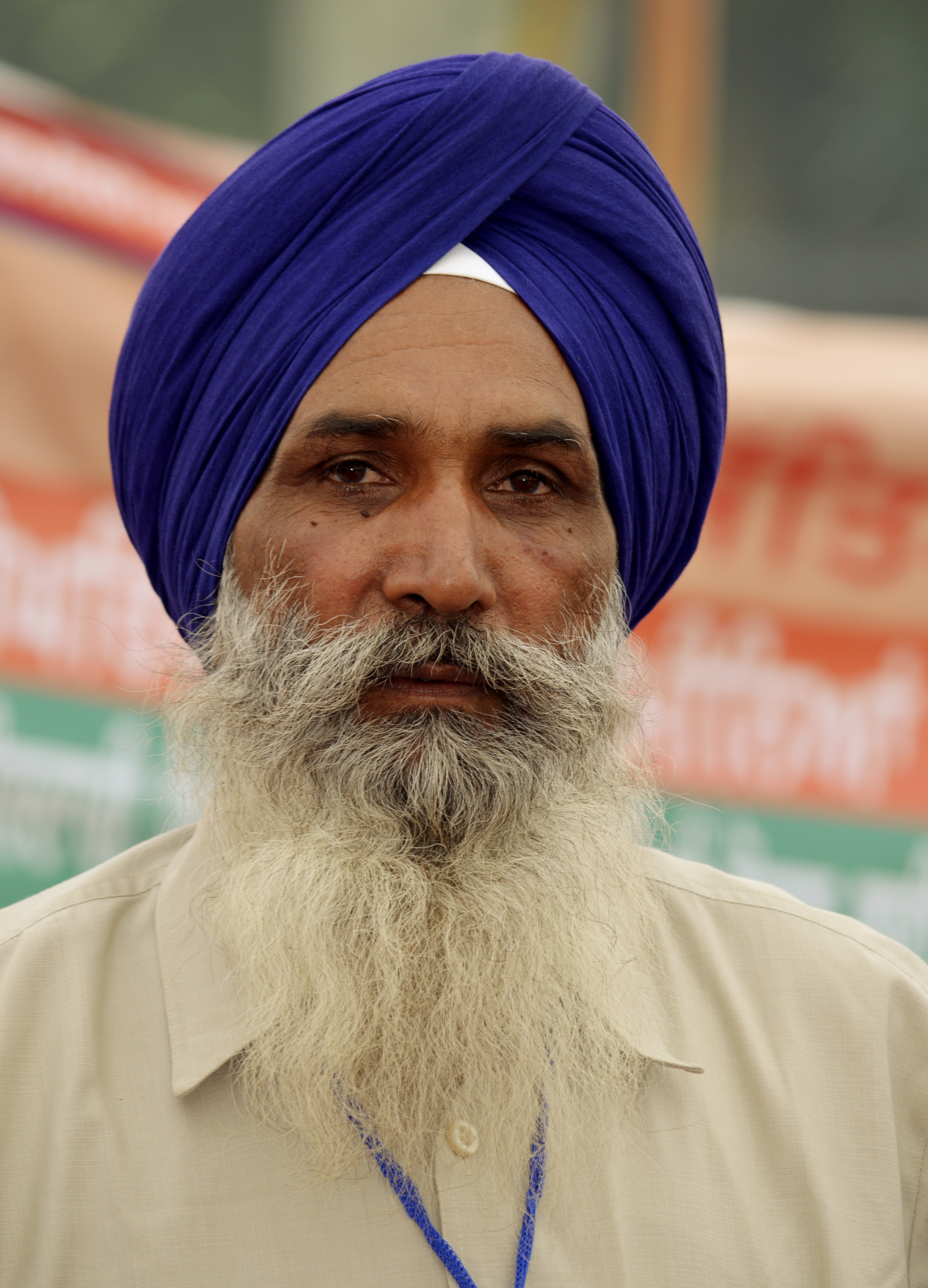
A Sikh man with kesh (hair of head and beard), one of five articles /symbols of Sikhs

The five Ks (panj kakaar) are five articles of faith which all initiated (Amritdhari) Sikhs are obliged to wear. The symbols represent the ideals of Sikhism: honesty, equality, fidelity, meditating on Waheguru and never bowing to tyranny. The five symbols are:

1. Kesh: Uncut hair, usually tied and wrapped in a turban.
2. Kanga: A wooden comb, usually worn under a turban to always also keep one's hair clean and well-groomed.
3. Kachera: Cotton undergarments, worn by both sexes; the kachera is a symbol of chastity and also a symbol of cleanliness. It is also historically appropriate in battle due to increased mobility and comfort when compared to a dhoti.
4. Kara: An iron bracelet, a symbol of eternity, strength and a constant reminder of the strength of will to keep hands away from any kind of unethical practices.
5. Kirpan: An iron blade in different sizes. In the UK, Sikhs can wear a small dagger, but in Punjab, they might wear a traditional curved sword from one to three feet in length. Kirpan is only a weapon of defense and religious protection, used to serve humanity and to be used against oppression.

=== Music and instruments ===
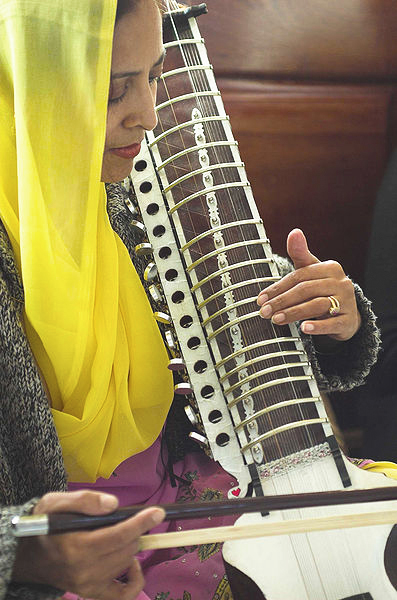
Woman playing the dilruba

The Sikhs have a number of musical instruments, including the rebab, dilruba, taus, jori and sarinda. Playing the sarangi was encouraged by Guru Hargobind. The rebab was played by Bhai Mardana as he accompanied Guru Nanak on his journeys. The jori and sarinda were introduced to Sikh devotional music by Guru Arjan. The taus (Persian for "peacock") was designed by Guru Hargobind, who supposedly heard a peacock singing and wanted to create an instrument mimicking its sounds. The dilruba was designed by Guru Gobind Singh at the request of his followers, who wanted a smaller instrument than the taus. After Japji Sahib, all of the shabad in the Guru Granth Sahib were composed as raags. This type of singing is known as Gurmat Sangeet.

When they marched into battle, the Sikhs would play a Ranjit nagara ('victory drum') to boost morale. Nagaras (usually two to three feet in diameter, although some were up to five feet in diameter) are played with two sticks. The beat of the large drums and the raising of the Nishan Sahib, meant that the Singhs were on their way.

== Khalistan movement ==
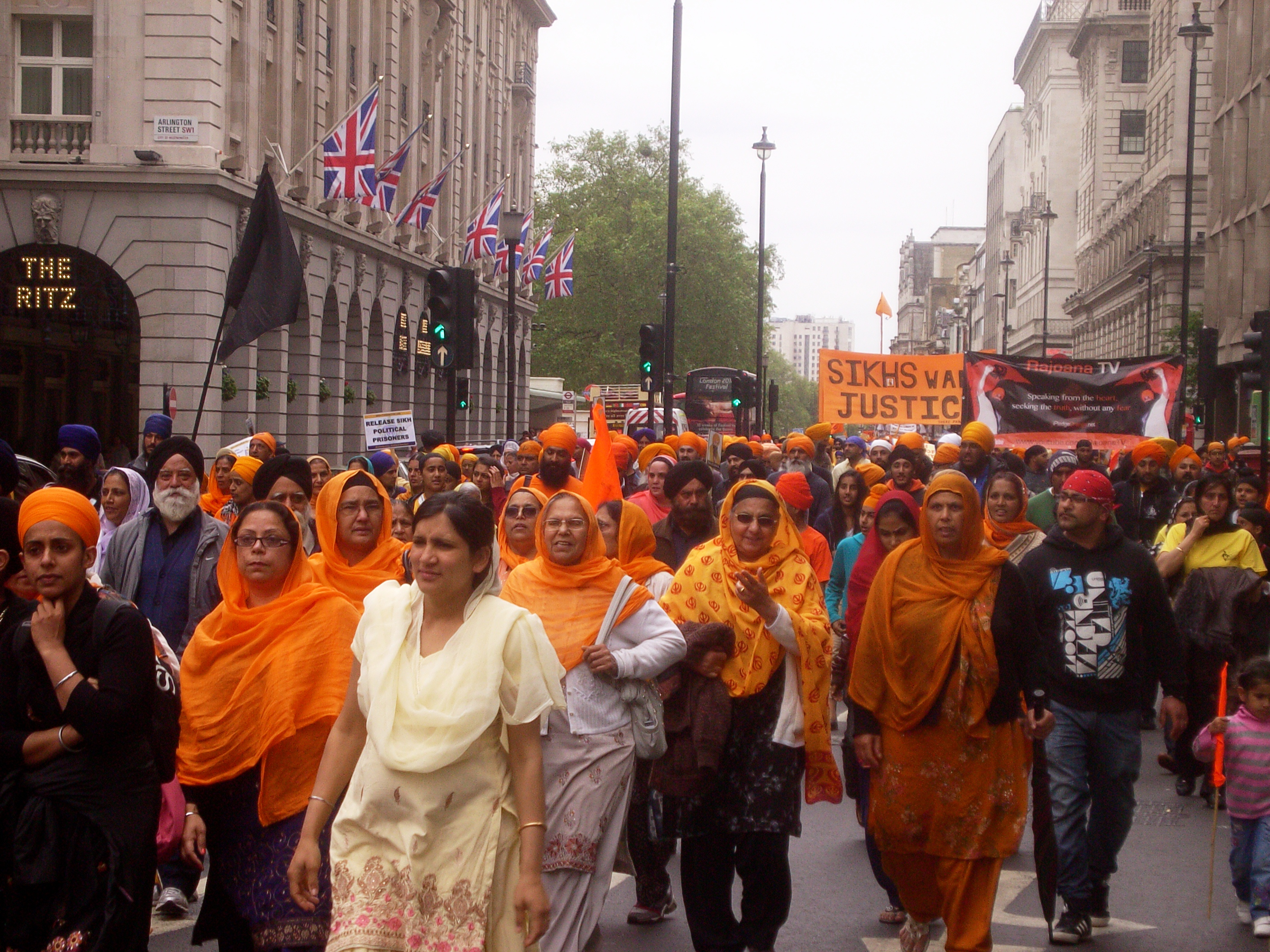
Sikhs in London protesting against Indian government actions

The Khalistan movement is a Sikh separatist movement, which seeks to create a separate country called Khalistān ('The Land of the Khalsa') in the Punjab state of India to serve as a homeland for Sikhs. The territorial definition of the proposed country Khalistan consists of the Punjab, India and includes Haryana, Himachal Pradesh, Jammu and Kashmir and Rajasthan.

Khalistan movement began as an expatriate venture. In 1971, the first explicit call for Khalistan was made in an advertisement published in the New York Times by an expat (Jagjit Singh Chohan). By proclaiming the formation of Khalistan, he was able to collect millions of dollars from the Sikh diaspora. On 12 April 1980, he declared the formation of the "National Council of Khalistan," at Anandpur Sahib. He declared himself as the President of the council and named Balbir Singh Sandhu as its Secretary General. In May 1980, Chohan traveled to London and announced the formation of Khalistan. A similar announcement was made by Balbir Singh Sandhu in Amritsar, where he began releasing stamps and currency of Khalistan. The inaction of the authorities in Amritsar and elsewhere was decried as a political stunt by the Congress(I) party of Indira Gandhi by the Akali Dal, headed by the Sikh leader Harchand Singh Longowal.

The movement flourished in the Indian state of Punjab following Operation Blue Star and the Anti-Sikh Pogroms. As proponents were able to generate funding from a grieving diaspora. In June 1985, Air India Flight 182 was bombed by Babbar Khalsa, a pro-Khalistani terrorist organisation. In January 1986, the Golden Temple was occupied by militants belonging to All India Sikh Students Federation and Damdami Taksal. On 26 January 1986, a gathering known as the Sarbat Khalsa (a de facto parliament) passed a resolution (gurmattā) favouring the creation of Khalistan. Subsequently, a number of rebel militant groups in favour of Khalistan waged a major insurgency against the government of India. Indian security forces suppressed the insurgency in the early 1990s, but Sikh political groups such as the Khalsa Raj Party and SAD (A) continued to pursue an independent Khalistan through non-violent means. Pro-Khalistan organisations such as Dal Khalsa (International) are also active outside India, supported by a section of the Sikh diaspora.

In the 1990s, the insurgency abated, and the movement failed to reach its objective due to multiple reasons including a heavy police crackdown on separatists, divisions among the Sikhs and loss of support from the Sikh population. However, various pro-Khalistan groups, both political and militant, remain committed to the separatist movement. There are claims of funding from Sikhs outside India to attract young people into militant groups. There have also been multiple claims that the movement is motivated and supported by the Pakistan's external intelligence agency, the ISI.

== Demographics ==
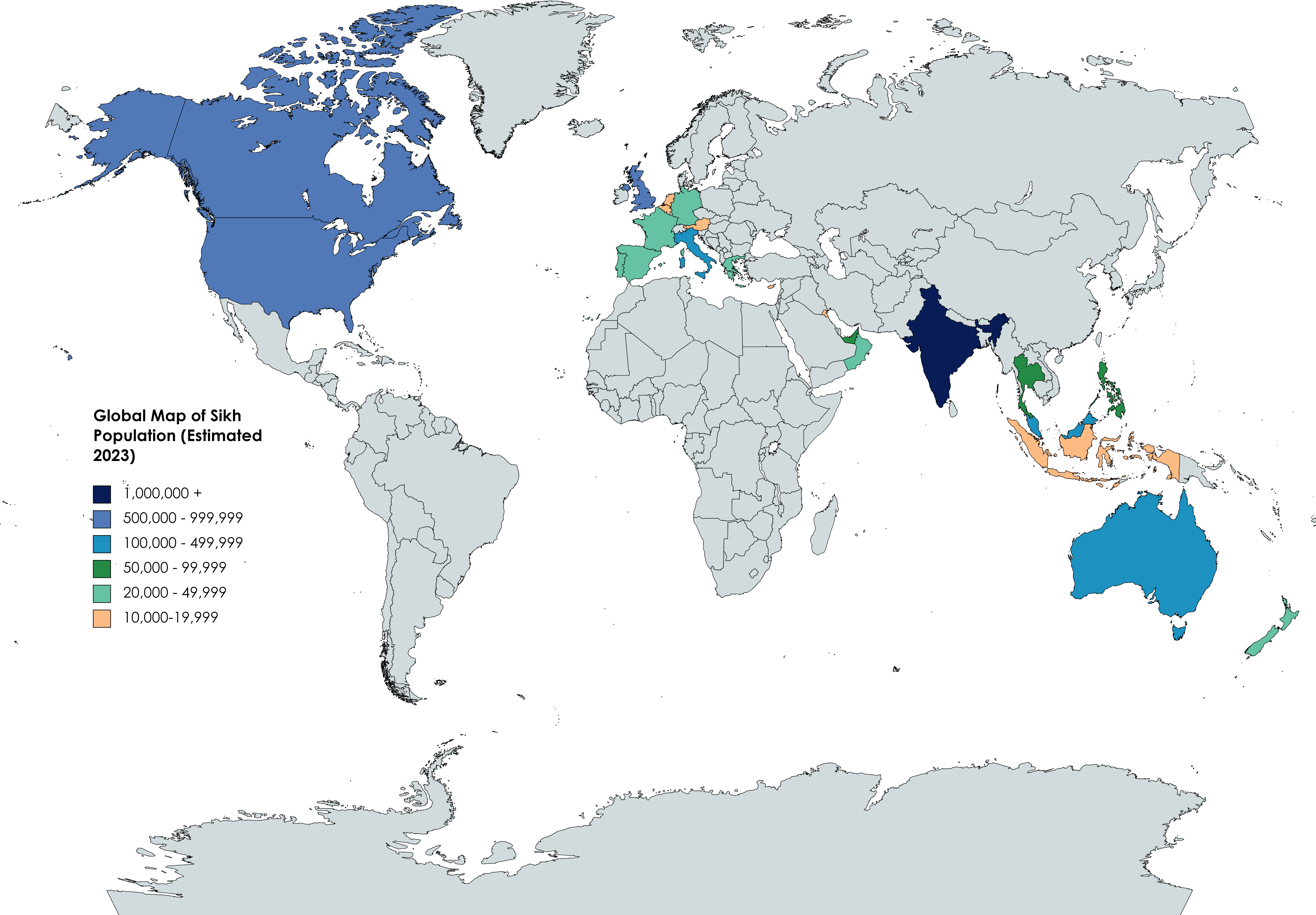
Global map of Sikh population (estimated 2023)

Sikhs number about 26–30 million worldwide, of whom 24–28 million live in India, which thus represents around 90 percent of the total Sikh population. A 2020 estimate by Charles Preston gives a figure of 29,254,000 of Sikhs worldwide. About 76 percent of all Indian Sikhs live in the northern Indian state of Punjab, forming a majority of about 58 per cent of the state's population, roughly around 16 million. Substantial communities of Sikhs live in the Indian states or union territories of Haryana, where they number around 1.2 million and form 4.9 percent of the population, Rajasthan (872,000 or 1.3 percent of the population), Uttar Pradesh (643,000, 0.3 percent), Delhi (570,000, 3.4 percent), Uttarakhand (236,000, 2.3 percent), Jammu and Kashmir (234,000, 1.9 percent), Chandigarh (138,000, 13.1 percent) and Himachal Pradesh (86,000, 1.2 percent).

Canada is home to the largest national Sikh proportion (2.1 percent of the total population) in the world. A substantial community of Sikhs exist in the western province of British Columbia, numbering nearly 300,000 persons and forming approximately 5.9 percent of the total population. This represents the third-largest Sikh proportion amongst all global administrative divisions, behind only Punjab and Chandigarh in India. Furthermore, British Columbia, Manitoba and Yukon hold the distinction of being three of the only four administrative divisions in the world with Sikhism as the second most followed religion among the population. (Note: Per the 2021 Canadian census, Sikhism is the second-largest religion in British Columbia, Manitoba, and Yukon. Per the 2011 Indian census, Sikhism is the largest religion in Punjab and second in Chandigarh. These are the only two Indian states/UTs where Sikhism is one of the two most common religions.)

Whilst Punjab, India has had a majority Sikh population for decades, recent statistics point toward a demographic decline of Sikhs in the state. School data from the Civil Registration System (CRS) shows that Sikh children are now a plurality (49%) at the foundational-level (pre-primary to Class II in the age group of 3–8-years-old). The causes for the demographic decline of Sikhs in Indian Punjab has been attributed to low fertility-rates, outbound migration of Sikhs abroad, and internal migration within India of persons from other states, oftentimes Uttar Pradesh or Bihar, settling in Indian Punjab.

=== Census data and official statistics ===
As a religious minority, Sikhs have fought long and hard to get official status and to be counted in many countries across the world. Through the efforts of Sikh organisations and communities in their respective countries, there is now readily available population data on Sikhs as part of the census or official statistics in the following territories:

Census data / official statistics:
Territory	Latest data	
India (Punjab)	16,004,754	2011
India (Rest of India)	4,828,362	2011
Canada	771,790	2021
England	520,092	2021
Australia	210,400	2021
Malaysia	130,000	2011
New Zealand	53,406	2023
Pakistan	15,998	2023
Singapore	12,051	2020
Thailand	11,124	2010
Scotland	10,988	2022
Norway	4,318	2021
Wales	4,048	2021
Fiji	2,577	2007
Ireland	2,183	2022
Nepal	1,496	2021
Northern Ireland	389	2021

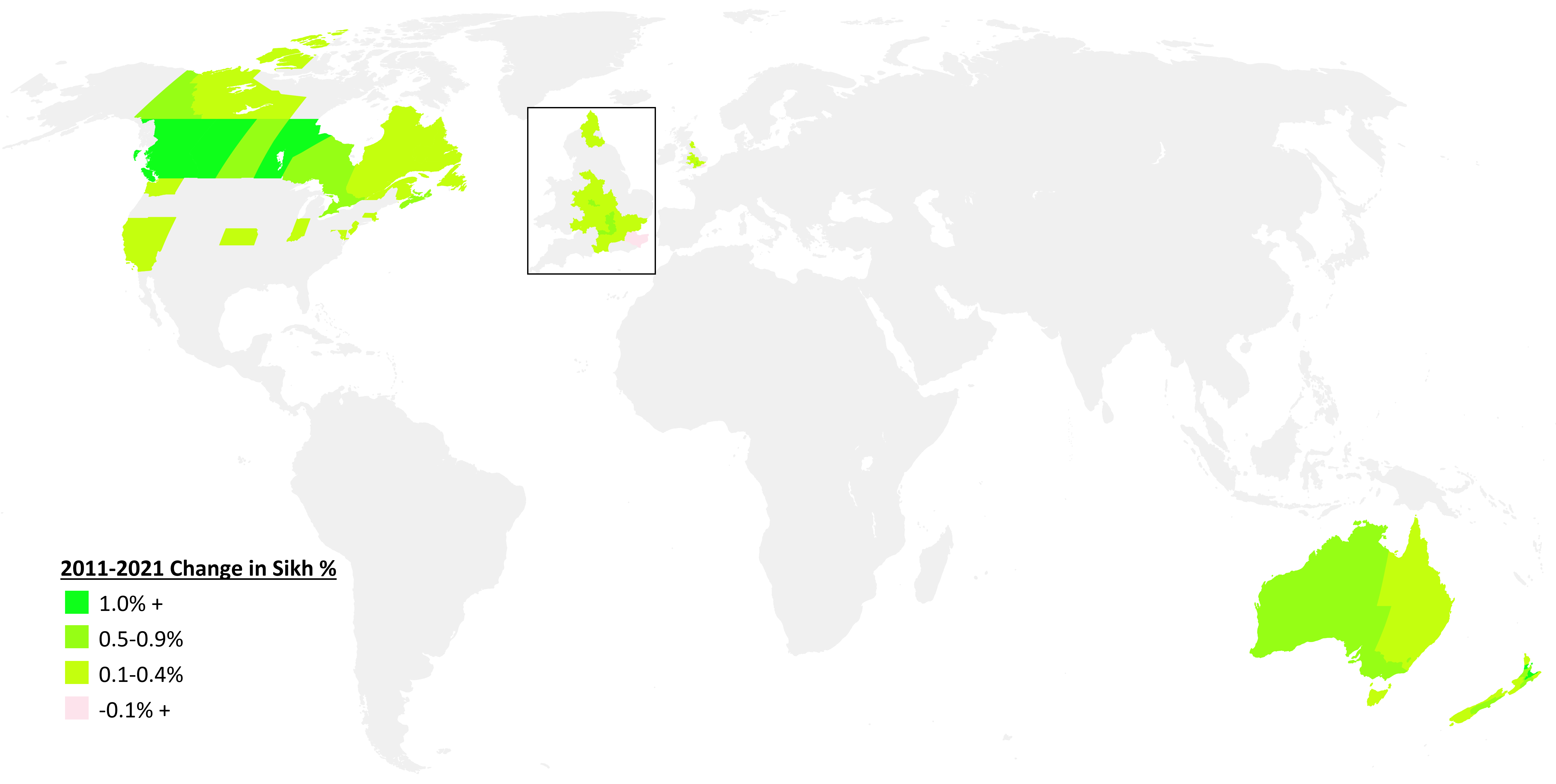
2011–2021 change in Sikh %

Note: Official statistics do not count unregistered arrivals or those who have not completed the census or surveys. However, they do provide for a much more accurate depiction of Sikh communities as opposed to estimates from various Sikh organisations whose estimates can vary vastly with no statistically valuable source. Thus, official statistics and census data is highly important and Sikh communities continue to push for census inclusion in many countries where they are still not counted.

=== Migration ===
Sikh migration from British India began in earnest during the second half of the 19th century, when the British completed their annexation of the Punjab, which led to Sikh migration throughout India and the British Empire. During the Raj, semiskilled Sikh artisans were transported from the Punjab to British East Africa to help build railroads. Sikhs emigrated from India after World War II, most going to the United Kingdom but many also to North America. Some Sikhs who had settled in eastern Africa were expelled by Ugandan dictator Idi Amin in 1972. Economics is a major factor in Sikh migration and significant communities exist in the United Kingdom, the United States, Malaysia, East Africa, Australia, Singapore and Thailand.

After the Partition of India in 1947, many Sikhs from what would become the Punjab of Pakistan migrated to India as well as to Afghanistan due to fear of persecution. Afghanistan was home to hundreds of thousands of Sikhs and Hindus as of the 1970s, but due to the wars in Afghanistan in the 2010s, the vast majority of Afghan Sikhs had migrated to India, Pakistan or the west.

Although the rate of Sikh migration from the Punjab has remained high, traditional patterns of Sikh migration favouring English-speaking countries (particularly the United Kingdom) have changed during the past decade due to stricter immigration laws. Moliner (2006) wrote that as a consequence of Sikh migration to the UK becoming "virtually impossible since the late 1970s", migration patterns evolved to continental Europe. Italy is a rapidly growing destination for Sikh migration, with Reggio Emilia and Vicenza having significant Sikh population clusters. Italian Sikhs are generally involved in agriculture, agricultural processing, the manufacture of machine tools and horticulture.

=== Growth ===
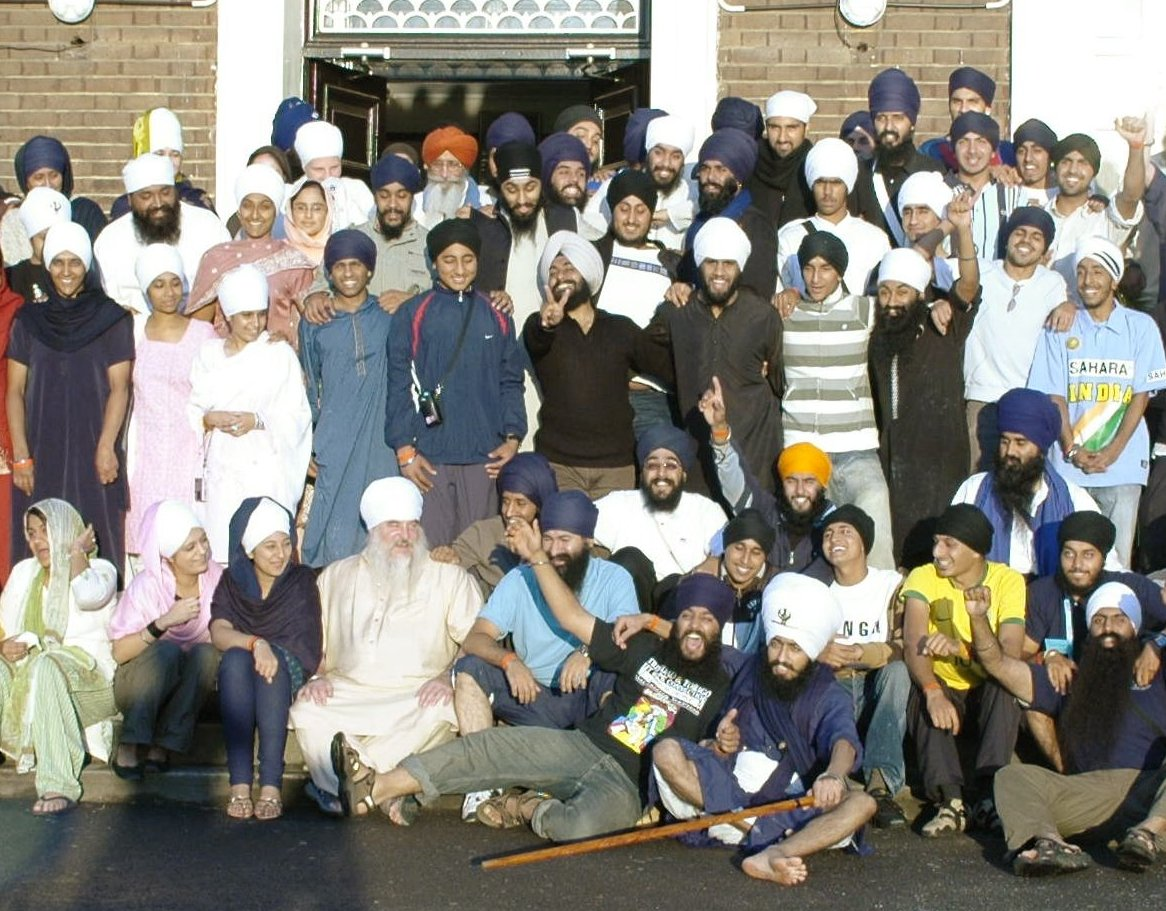
A group of Sikh people

Johnson and Barrett (2004) estimate that the global Sikh population increases annually by 392,633 (1.7% per year, based on 2004 figures); this percentage includes births, deaths and conversions. Primarily for socio-economic reasons, Indian Sikhs have the lowest adjusted growth rate of any major religious group in India, at 16.9% per decade (estimated from 1991 to 2001); the 2011 census report showed this declining further to 8.4%. Sikhs in the world have the lowest fertility rate of 1.6 children per women as per (2019–20) estimation research. The Sikh population has the lowest gender balance in India, with only 903 women per 1,000 men according to the 2011 Indian census. The estimated world's Sikh population was over 30 million in 2020 and it will reach 42 million by 2050. It is expected to increase up to 62 million by 2100, given that the anticipated growth rate of 1.7% per year and adding at least 400,000 followers annually.

Since the Sikh growth rate dropped from 1.7% (16.9% in 1991 to 2001 estimate) to 0.8% (8.4% in 2001–2011) in 2011 report, hence based on their growth rate, their population in India will increase 196,316 (0.8% based on 2011 figures) per year and will reach 36 million in 2050, it expected to reach 52 million in 2100 given that the anticipated growth rate of 0.8% and adding at least 200,000 followers annually.

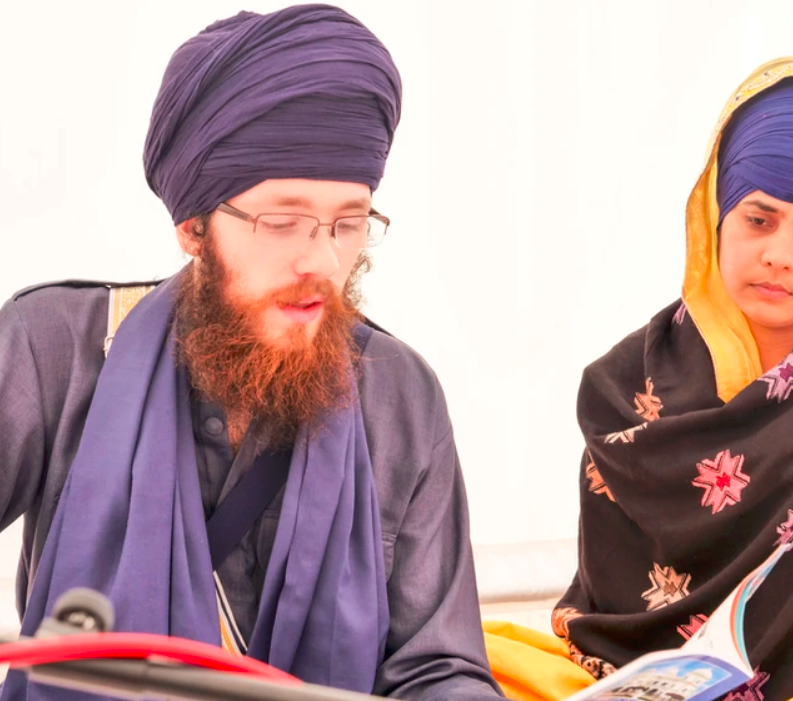
A Sikh of European descent learning Santhiya or elocution of Sikh scripture

Sikhism is the fastest-growing religion in Canada, Australia and New Zealand. The growth is mainly contributed by the immigration of Indian Sikhs there over the decades. Sikhism is fourth-largest religion in Canada, fifth-largest religion in Australia and New Zealand. The decadal growth of Sikhs is more in those countries as compared to the decadal growth of Sikh population in India, thus making them the fastest-growing religion there. Canada has the highest proportion of Sikhs in the globe, which stands at 2.1% as of 2021, as compared to India which stands at 1.7% as of 2011 respectively.

=== Castes ===
Sikhs have remained a relatively homogeneous ethnic group with exceptions. Caste may still be practiced by some Sikhs, despite Guru Nanak's calls for treating everyone equally in Guru Granth Sahib. (Note: Guru Nanak has mentioned in his first composition of Jap Ji Sahib, which is recited daily by all practicing Sikhs that all souls are to be treated with care and respect as Waheguru is the Giver of all souls. "The Guru has given me this one understanding: there is only the One, the Giver of all souls. May I never forget Him!", Guru Granth Sahib, 2 Guru Nanak said that blessings are rained down when the lowly person, regardless of any background are cared for. "In that place where the lowly are cared for-there, the Blessings of Your Glance of Grace rain down.", Guru Granth Sahib, 15 Guru Nanak had spoken we need to prize humility above all and thus caste is not an issue. "One who takes pride in wealth and lands is a fool, blind and ignorant. One whose heart is mercifully blessed with abiding humility, O Nanak, is liberated here, and obtains peace hereafter." Granth Sahib, 278.)

Along with Guru Nanak, other Sikh gurus had also denounced the hierarchy of the caste system, however, they all belonged to the same caste, the Khatris. Most Sikhs belong to the Jat (Jatt), traditionally Agriculturist class in occupation. Despite being very small in numbers, the Khatri and Arora castes wield considerable influence within the Sikh community. Other common castes among the Sikhs include Ahluwalias (Brewers), Kambojs or Kambos (Rural caste), Ramgarhias (Carpenters), Brahmins (Priestly class), Rajputs (Kshatriyas – Warriors), Sainis, Rai Sikh (Ironsmiths), Labanas (Merchants), Kumhars (Potters), Mazhabi (Cleaners) and the Ramdasia/Ravidasias(Chamar – Tanners).

Some Sikhs, especially those belonging to the landowning dominant castes, have not shed all their prejudices against the Dalit castes such as the Mazhabi and Ravidasia. While Dalits were allowed entry into the village gurdwaras, in some gurdwaras, they were not permitted to cook or serve langar (communal meal). Therefore, wherever they could mobilise resources, the Sikh Dalits of Punjab have tried to construct their own gurdwara and other local-level institutions in order to attain a certain degree of cultural autonomy. In 1953, Sikh leader and activist Master Tara Singh succeeded in persuading the Indian government to include Sikh castes of the converted untouchables in the list of scheduled castes. In the Shiromani Gurdwara Prabandhak Committee, 20 of the 140 seats are reserved for low-caste Sikhs.

Other castes (over 1,000 members) include the Arain, Bhatra, Bairagi, Bania, Basith, Bawaria, Bazigar, Bhabra, Chamar, Chhimba (cotton farmers), Darzi, Dhobi, Gujar, Jhinwar, Kahar, Kalal, Kumhar, Lohar, Mahtam, Megh, Mirasi, Mochi, Nai, Ramgharia, Sansi, Sudh, Tarkhan and Kashyap

Karnail Singh Panjoli, member of the Shiromani Gurdwara Prabandhak Committee, says that there are several communities within the term Nanakpanthis too. Apart from Sindhi Hindus, "There are groups like Sikhligarh, Vanjaarey, Nirmaley, Lubaney, Johri, Satnamiye, Udaasiyas, Punjabi Hindus, etc. who call themselves Nanakpanthis despite being Hindus.

== Diaspora ==
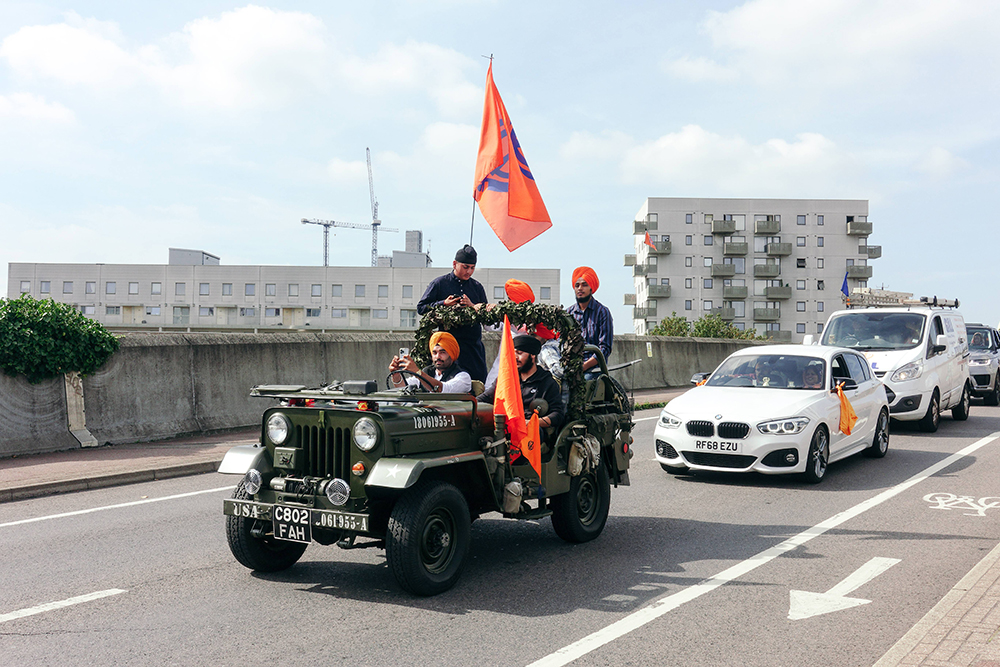
Nagar kirtan convoy passing over the bridge along Northern Relief Road (A124) in East London.

As Sikhs wear turbans and keep beards, Sikh men in Western countries have been mistaken for Muslim, Arab and/or Afghan since the September 11 attacks and the Iraq War. Several days after the 9/11 attacks, Sikh-American gas station owner Balbir Singh Sodhi was murdered in Arizona by a man who took Sodhi to be a member of al-Qaeda, marking the first recorded hate-crime in America motivated by 9/11. CNN would go on to suggest an increase in hate crimes against Sikh men in the US and the UK after the 9/11 attacks.

In an attempt to foster Sikh leaders in the Western world, youth initiatives by a number of organisations exist. The Sikh Youth Alliance of North America sponsors an annual Sikh Youth Symposium.

The Sikh diaspora has been most successful in the UK, and UK Sikhs have the highest percentage of home ownership (82%) of any religious community. UK Sikhs are the second-wealthiest religious group in the UK (after the Jewish community), with a median total household wealth of £229,000.

In May 2019, the UK government exempted "Kirpan" from the list of banned knives. The U.K. government passed an amendment by which Sikhs in the country would be allowed to carry kirpans and use them during religious and cultural functions. The bill was amended to ensure that it would not impact the right of the British Sikh community to possess and supply kirpans or religious swords. Similarly, the Sikh American Legal Defense and Education Fund overturned a 1925 Oregon law banning the wearing of turbans by teachers and government officials in 2010.

== Agriculture ==
Historically, most Indians have been farmers and 66 percent of the Indian population are engaged in agriculture. Indian Sikhs are employed in agriculture to a lesser extent; India's 2001 census found 39 per cent of the working population of the Punjab employed in this sector. According to the Swedish political scientist Ishtiaq Ahmad, a factor in the success of the Indian green revolution was the "Sikh cultivator, often the Jat and Kamboj or Kamboh, whose courage, perseverance, spirit of enterprise and muscle prowess proved crucial." However, Indian ecofeminist Vandana Shiva wrote that the green revolution made the "negative and destructive impacts of science (i.e., the green revolution) on nature and society" invisible and was a catalyst for Punjabi Sikh and Hindu tensions despite a growth in material wealth.

== Sikhs in modern history ==
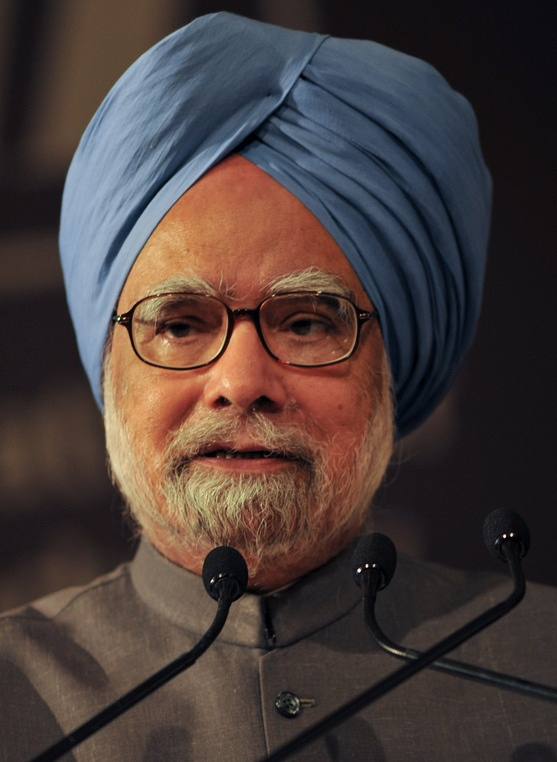
Manmohan Singh, Indian politician and economist and the only Sikh Prime Minister of India, served from 2004 to 2014

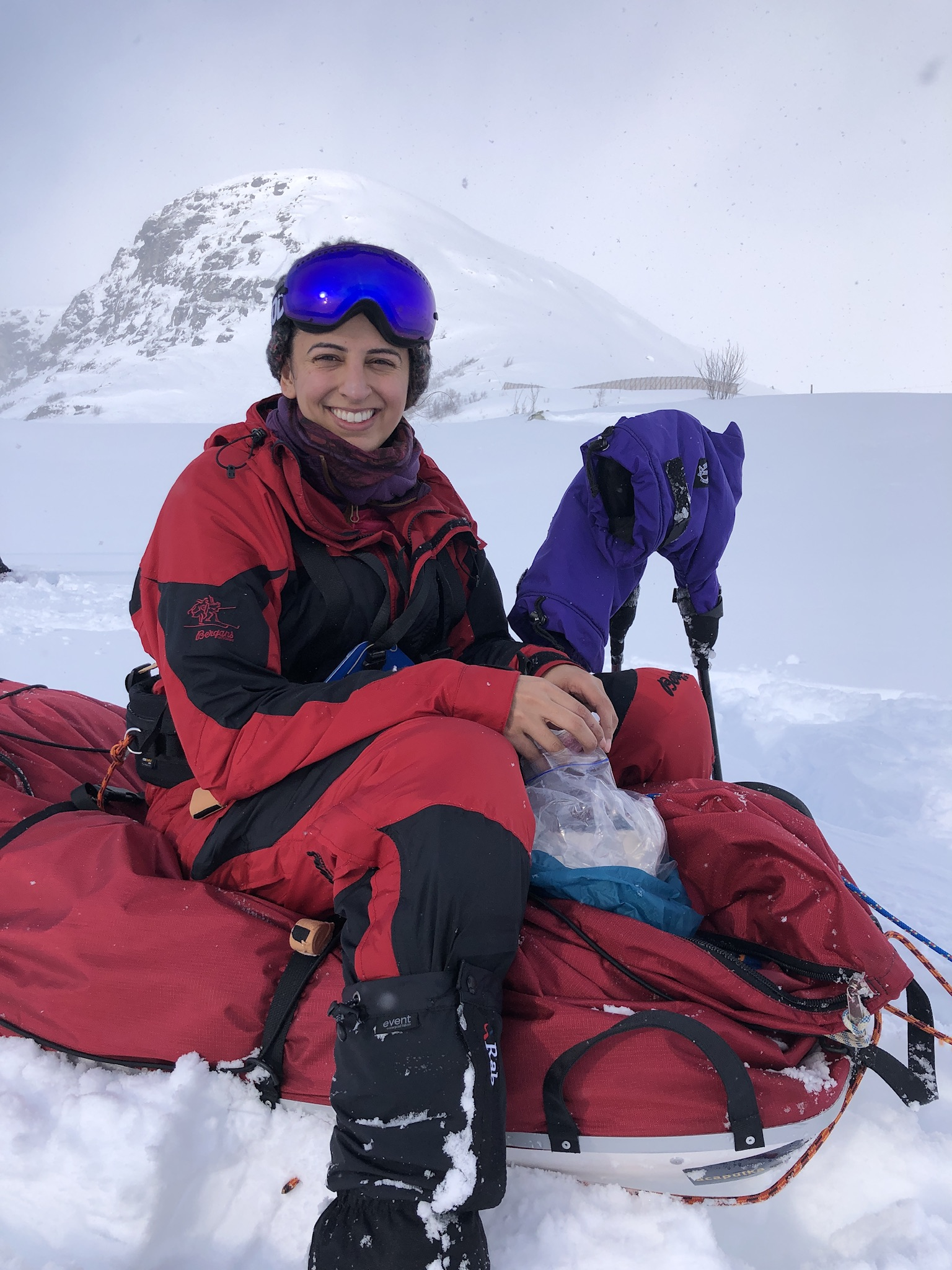
Harpreet Kaur Chandi, a British Sikh and the first woman to reach the South Pole solo and unsupported

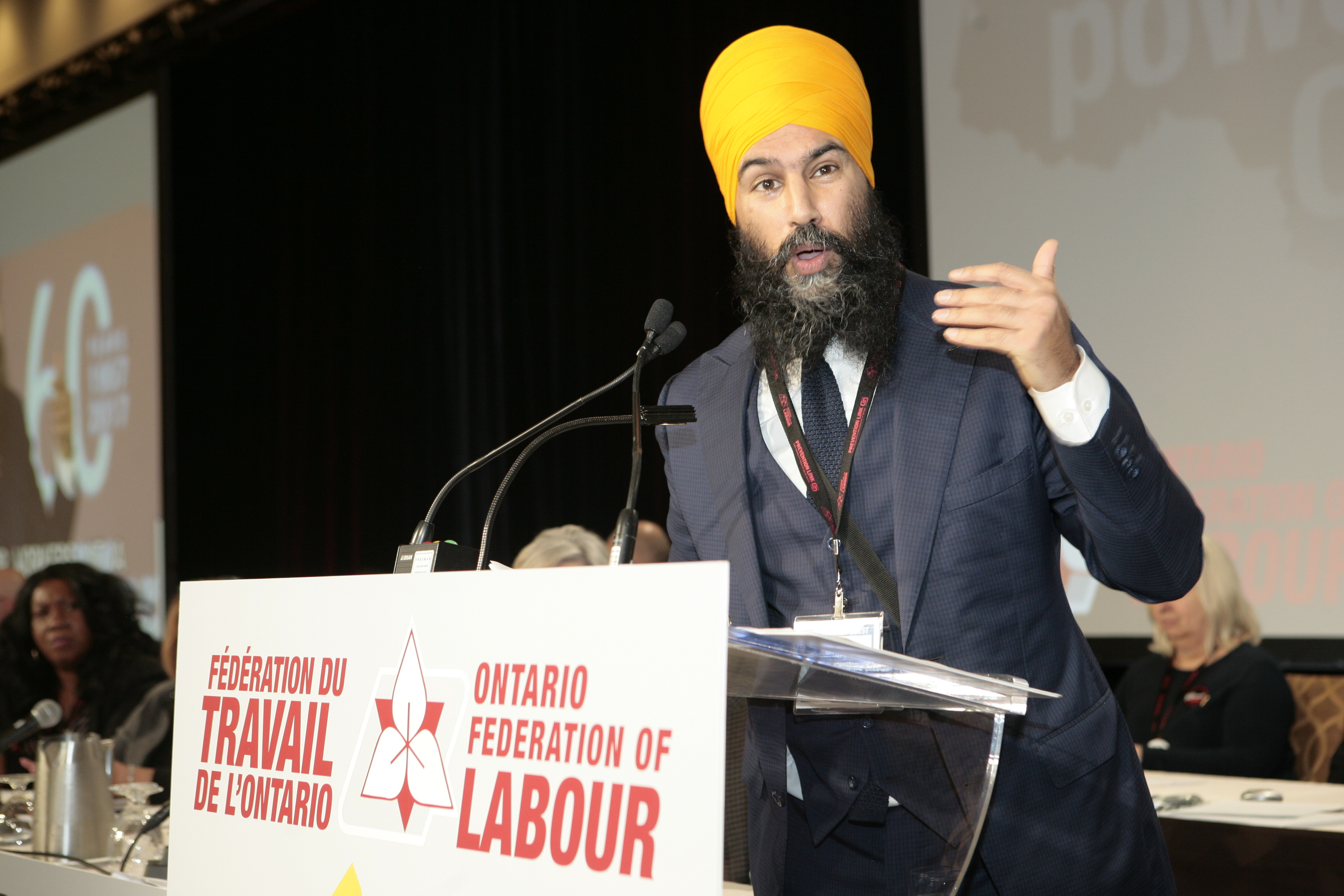
Jagmeet Singh, Canadian Sikh politician

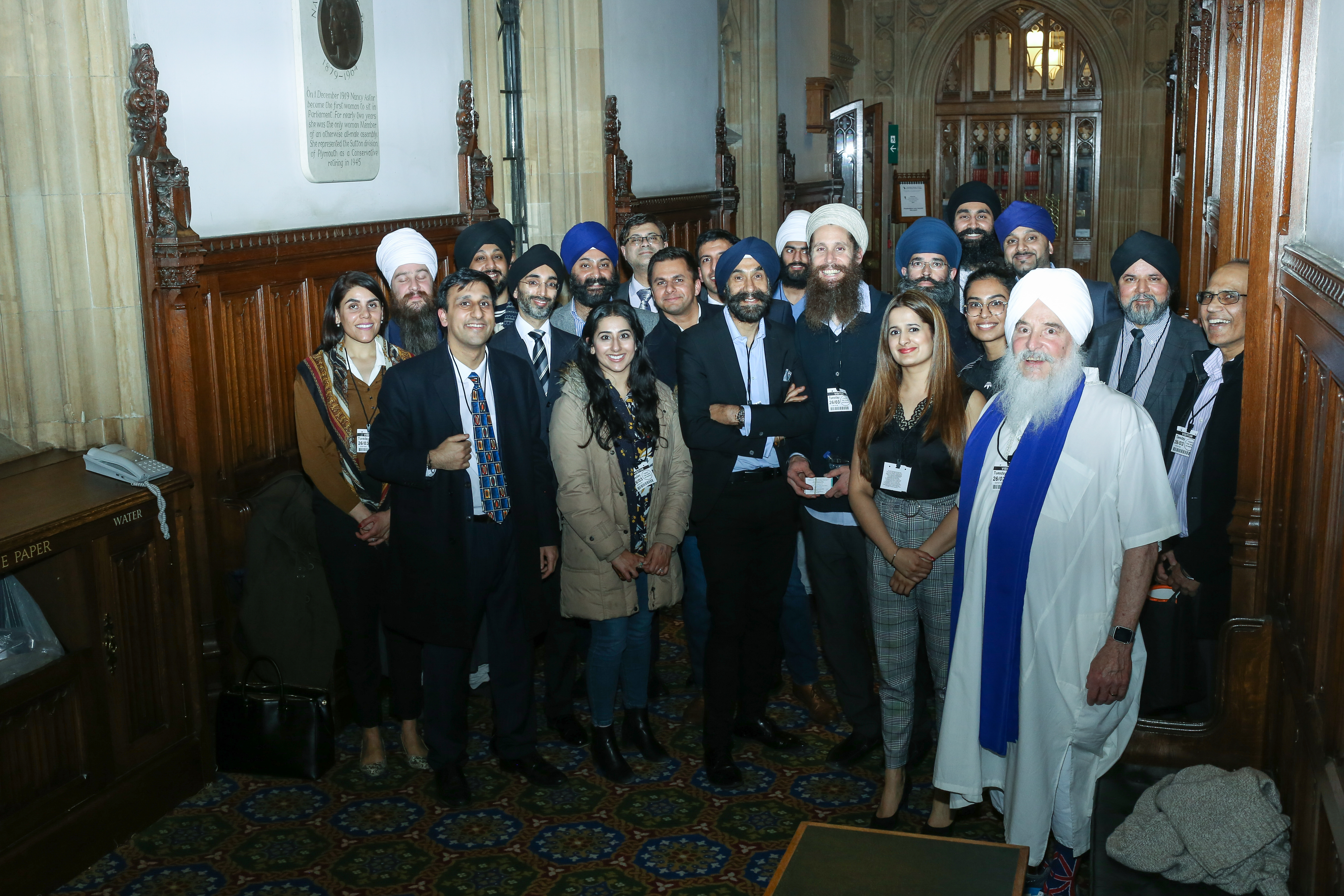
American Sikhs

Manmohan Singh was an Indian economist, academic and politician who served as the 13th Prime Minister of India from 2004 to 2014. The first and only Sikh and non-Hindu in office, Singh was also the first prime minister since Jawaharlal Nehru to be re-elected after completing a full five-year term.

Notable Sikhs in science include nuclear scientist Piara Singh Gill, fibre-optics pioneer Narinder Singh Kapany; and physicist, science writer and broadcaster Simon Singh.

In business, the UK-based clothing retailers New Look and the Thai-based JASPAL were founded by Sikhs. India's largest pharmaceutical company, Ranbaxy Laboratories, is headed by Sikhs. Apollo Tyres is headed by Onkar Singh Kanwar. In Singapore, Kartar Singh Thakral expanded his family's trading business, Thakral Holdings, into assets totalling almost US$1.4 billion and is Singapore's 25th-richest person. Sikh Bob Singh Dhillon is the first Indo-Canadian billionaire. Mastercard's CEO was a Sikh named Ajaypal Singh Banga.

In sports, Sikhs include England cricketer Monty Panesar; former 400-metre runner Milkha Singh; his son, professional golfer Jeev Milkha Singh; Indian wrestler and actor Dara Singh; former Indian hockey team captains Sandeep Singh, Ajitpal Singh and Balbir Singh Sr.; former Indian cricket captain Bishen Singh Bedi; Harbhajan Singh, India's most successful off spin cricket bowler; Yuvraj Singh, World Cup winning allrounder; Maninder Singh, World Cup winning off spinner; and Navjot Singh Sidhu, former Indian cricketer-turned-politician.

Sikhs in Bollywood, in the arts in general, include poet and lyricist Rajkavi Inderjeet Singh Tulsi; Gulzar; Jagjit Singh; Dharmendra; Sunny Deol; Diljit Dosanjh; writer Khushwant Singh; actresses Neetu Singh, Simran Judge, Poonam Dhillon, Mahi Gill, Esha Deol, Parminder Nagra, Gul Panag, Mona Singh, Namrata Singh Gujral; and directors Gurinder Chadha and Parminder Gill.

Sikhs in Punjabi Music industry include Sidhu Moose Wala, Diljit Dosanjh, Babu Singh Maan, Surjit Bindrakhia, Ammy Virk, Karan Aujla, Jazzy B, Sukha, Shubh, Miss Pooja.

In December 2022, the U.S. Marine Corps was compelled by a court order to allow two Sikhs to wear the turban and grow beards. This was a milestone for religious freedom and in the prevention of employment discrimination against Sikhs.

== In the Indian and British armies ==
According to a 1994 estimate, Punjabi Sikhs and Hindus comprised 10 to 15% of all ranks in the Indian Army. The Indian government does not release religious or ethnic origins of a military personnel, but a 1991 report by Tim McGirk estimated that 20% of Indian Army officers were Sikhs. Together with the Gurkhas recruited from Nepal, the Maratha Light Infantry from Maharashtra and the Jat Regiment, the Sikhs are one of the few communities to have exclusive regiments in the Indian Army. The Sikh Regiment is one of the most-decorated regiments in the army, with 73 Battle Honours, 14 Victoria Crosses, 21 first-class Indian Orders of Merit (equivalent to the Victoria Cross), 15 Theatre Honours, 5 COAS Unit Citations, two Param Vir Chakras, 14 Maha Vir Chakras, 5 Kirti Chakras, 67 Vir Chakras and 1,596 other awards. The highest-ranking general in the history of the Indian Air Force is a Punjabi Sikh, Marshal of the Air Force Arjan Singh. Plans by the United Kingdom Ministry of Defence for a Sikh infantry regiment were scrapped in June 2007.

Sikhs supported the British during the Indian Rebellion of 1857. By the beginning of World War I, Sikhs in the British Indian Army totaled over 100,000 (20 per cent of the force). Until 1945, fourteen Victoria Crosses (VC) were awarded to Sikhs, a per-capita regimental record. In 2002, the names of all Sikh VC and George Cross recipients were inscribed on the monument of the Memorial Gates on Constitution Hill, next to Buckingham Palace. Chanan Singh Dhillon was instrumental in campaigning for the memorial.

During World War I, Sikh battalions fought in Egypt, Palestine, Mesopotamia, Gallipoli and France. Six battalions of the Sikh Regiment were raised during World War II, serving in the Second Battle of El Alamein, the Burma and Italian campaigns and in Iraq, receiving 27 battle honours. Around the world, Sikhs are commemorated in Commonwealth cemeteries.

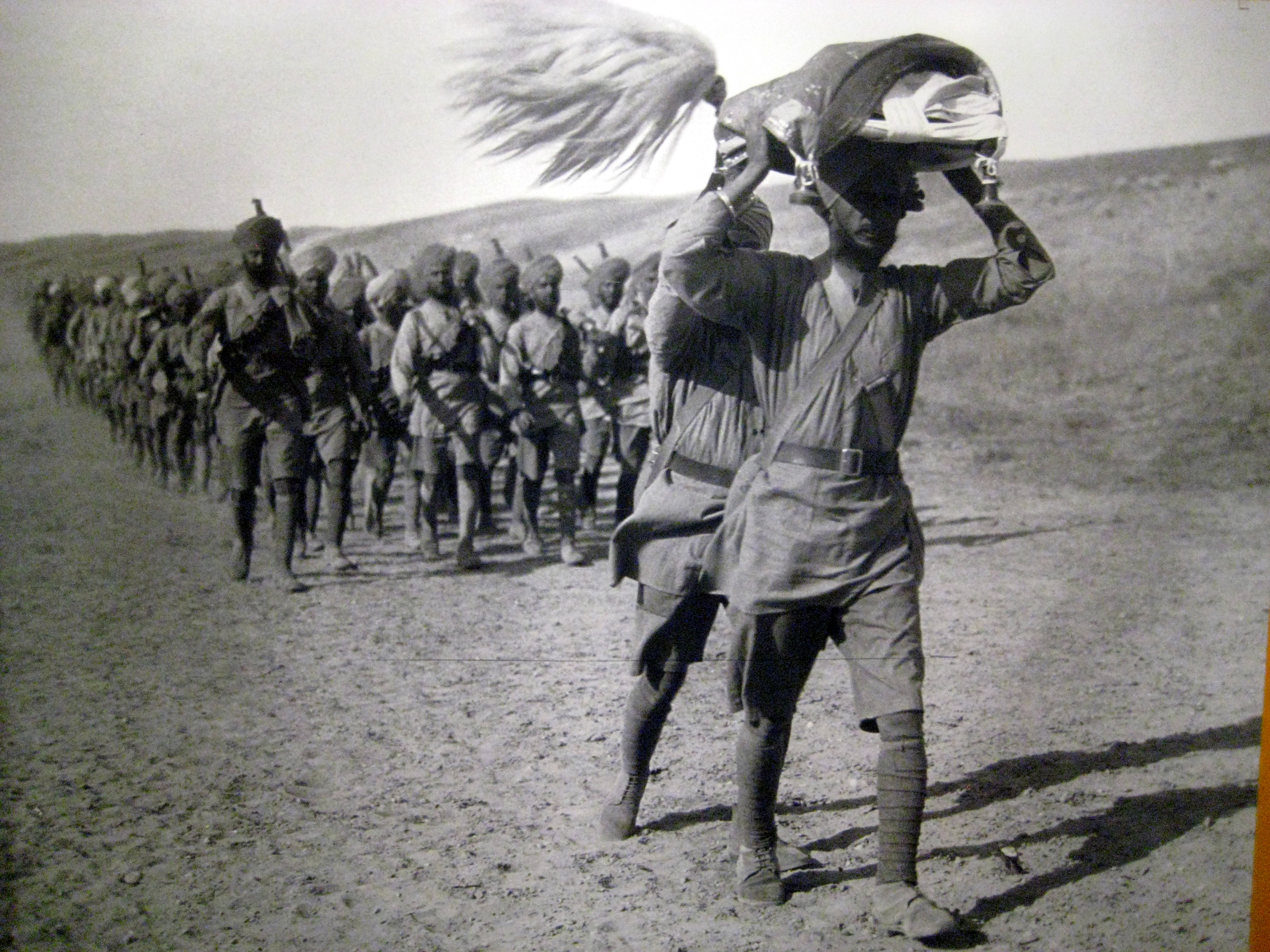
Sikhs in the First World War, marching with their scripture, Guru Granth Sahib

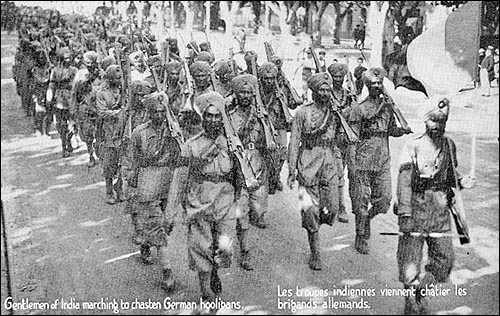
French postcard depicting the arrival of the 15th Sikh Regiment in France during World War I. The bilingual postcard reads, "Gentlemen of India marching to chasten the German hooligans."

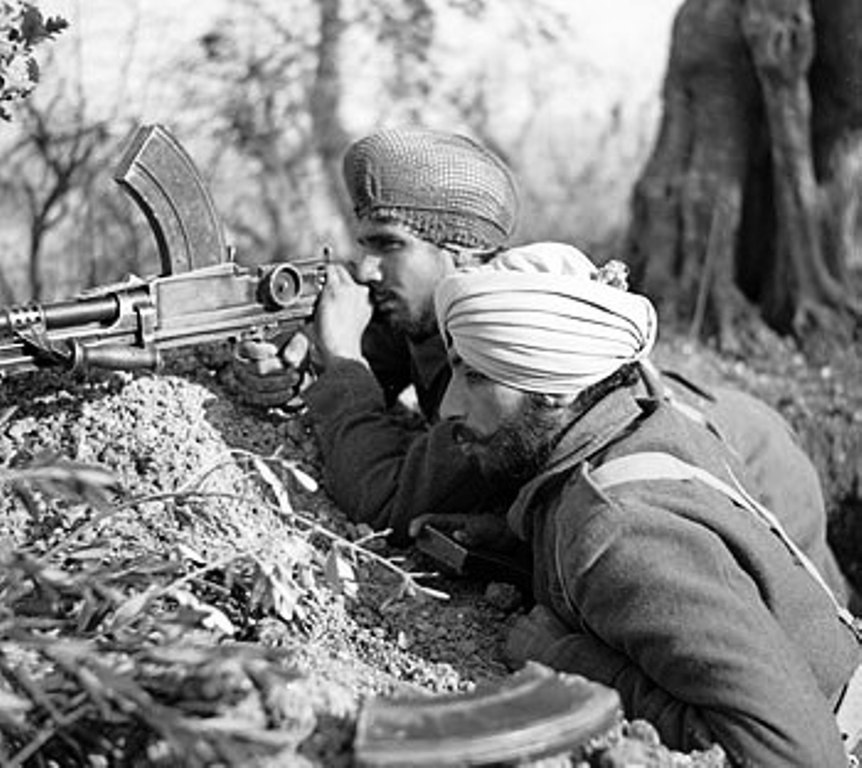
Indian Sikh soldiers in the Italian campaign

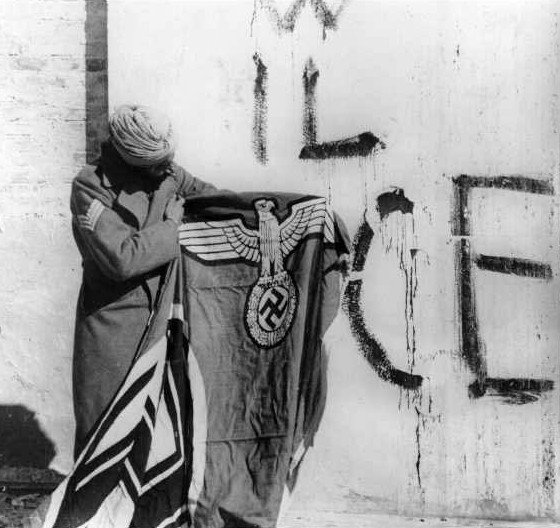
Sikh soldier with captured Swastika flag of Nazi Germany

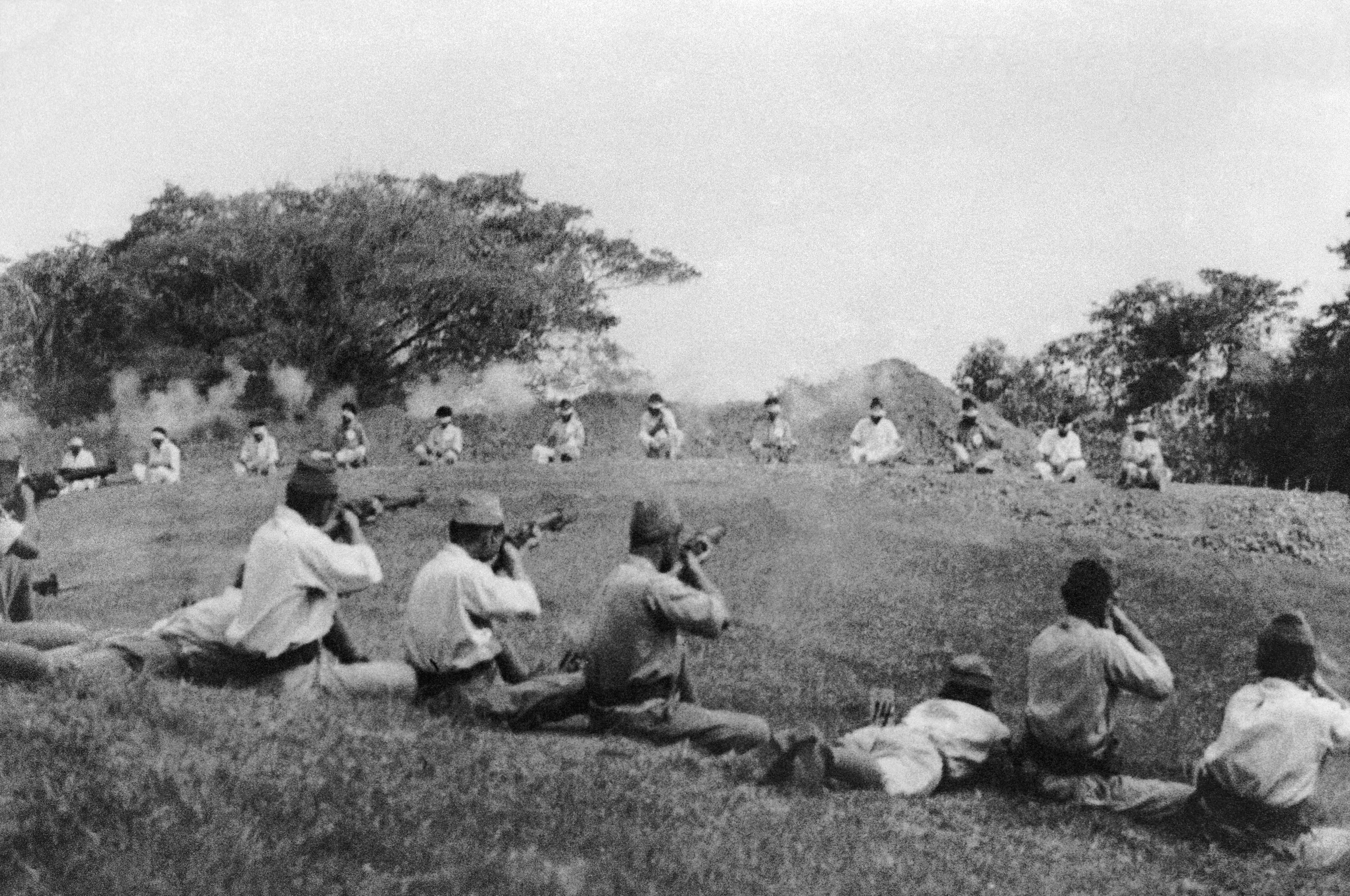
Japanese soldiers shooting blindfolded Sikh prisoners in World War II

== See also ==
- History of Punjab
- Sikhism in Jammu and Kashmir
- Ganga Sagar (urn)
- Jat Sikh
- Sikh diaspora
- Sikh Empire
- List of British Sikhs
- Mazhabi Sikh
- Sects of Sikhism
- Sikhism by country
- Sikhism in India
- Turban training centre
