= Chanan Singh Dhillon =

Punjabi Indian Sikh World War II veteran

- Born: 1920s
- Died: September 13, 2011
- Military career
- Allegiance: India
- Branch: British Indian Army; Indian Army
- Service years: British Indian Army - 1940-1947 Indian Army - 1947-1975
- Rank: Lieutenant Colonel
- Unit: Bengal Sappers
- Conflicts: World War II

Lieutenant-Colonel Chanan Singh Dhillon (c. 1920s – September 13, 2011) was a Punjabi Indian Sikh World War II hero and veteran. He served in the British Indian Army and the independent Indian Army for years.He is best known for his brave escapes and encounters during the war. He died on September 13, 2011 due to prolonged illness.

== Career ==
In 1939, at 20, he enlisted in the British Indian Army. Though he had wanted to become an officer, his limitations in English prevented him from doing so hence, he joined as an NCO. He later took English classes and gradually became a fluent speaker. He was posted to, among other places, Lahore and then Kabul. When WW2 broke out, he was promoted to Naik ( a non-commissioned officer) and given a special 'E' badge embroidered on a red background due to his fluency in the English language. His unit (Bengal Sappers) was moved to Basra, Iraq to secure the Persian Corridor and later, he was sent to the North African Frontlines. He belonged to the 41st Field Park Coy, RE, 8th Army.

His unit was stationed in Mersa Matruh, near El-Alamein. On 29 June 1942, amid fighting the advancing German Army, they received retreating orders however, as they were escaping, the Germans chased them and Chanan Singh Dhillon, along with 17 men from his company were captured. After their capture, they were taken to the prison camp in Benghazi. After one month, Chanan and 21 other NCOs were taken to the Agela seaport where they were forced to do the routine task of refueling and loading ammo. Due to the strain of work, they frequently tried to rebel but were suppressed by the Italian soldiers. Later, he got a chance to join the Axis-aligned Indian National Army but he turned it down. On 9 October, over 300 other Indian prisoners were bundled onto an old freighter, SS Loreto, on and shipped to Italy across the Mediterranean to be interned at one of the POW camps there. However, the freighter would be tracked and sunk by the British U class submarine, HMS Unruffled.

While at the Odine POW camp, near Naples in Italy, he made an unsuccessful attempt to escape via a tunnel and was later given solitary confinement for the same.

Transported from an Italian POW camp to a Stalag 12A (camp) near Limburg, Frankfurt in Germany after a series of escapes and recaptures, he was repatriated after the war.

In Germany he remained confined to POW Camp, Stalag XIIA in Limburg near Frankfurt. In addition, the International Red Cross, Geneva who was responsible for the welfare of POWs, appointed him Chief Man of confidence. The camp was liberated by American forces in 1945 where first he was taken to Paris, then brought to London and then sent back to India.

He joined the Independent Indian Army following the Indian Independence and was later sent to Kashmir as part of the First Kashmir War.

He served the Bengal Sappers as a Junior Commissioned Officer till he was granted a commission as a commissioned officer in the Indian Army on 27 November 1960. Eighteen years after his capture, He rose to the rank of Lieutenant-Colonel in the Indian Army.

== Retirement ==
in 1975 Dhillon retired, following his retirement, he became president of the Indian Ex-services League (Punjab and Chandigarh), in India.

He campaigned for the full recognition of the sacrifices and courage of the Indian-subcontinent, African and Caribbean origin soldiers who fought in WW2 for the allies and the British. The London Memorial Gates are recognition of this goal. On August 1, 2001, Queen Elizabeth laid the foundation of the memorial, and she inaugurated it the next year, on November 6, 2002.

Death

Lt. Col. Chanan Singh Dhillon died after a prolonged illness on 13 September 2011.
