= European Sikhs =

European Sikhs may refer to:

- Sikh diaspora in Europe
- Gora Sikhs or ethnically European Sikhs
