= Khugan =

Village in Markazi province, Iran

Khugan Persian: خوگان
- Village
- Location within Iran
- Coordinates: 33°48′04″N 50°09′34″E
- Country: Iran
- Province: Markazi
- County: Khomeyn
- District: Central
- Rural District: Salehan

Population (2016)
  - Total: 559
- Time zone: UTC+3:30 (IRST)

Khugan (Persian: خوگان) (Note: Also romanized as Khowgān and Khūgān; also known as Khūgān-e Bālā, Khūgān-e ‘Olyá, and Kūkān) Also spelled Khoogan, is a village in Salehan Rural District of the Central District in Khomeyn County, Markazi province, Iran.

== Demographics ==
=== Population ===
At the time of the 2006 National Census, the village's population was 775 in 244 households. The following census in 2011 counted 645 people in 221 households. The 2016 census measured the population of the village as 559 people in 212 households. Most of the population of this village speak a Turkish dialect.

== Geography ==
=== Location ===
This village contains an old dam that still has water. This village is close to villages such as: Khoravand, Goldasht, Belavarjan, Chenar, Zavarqan, Sarkubeh, Khiz ab and Chowgan.
