= Hadavand tribe =

Hadavand
هداوند
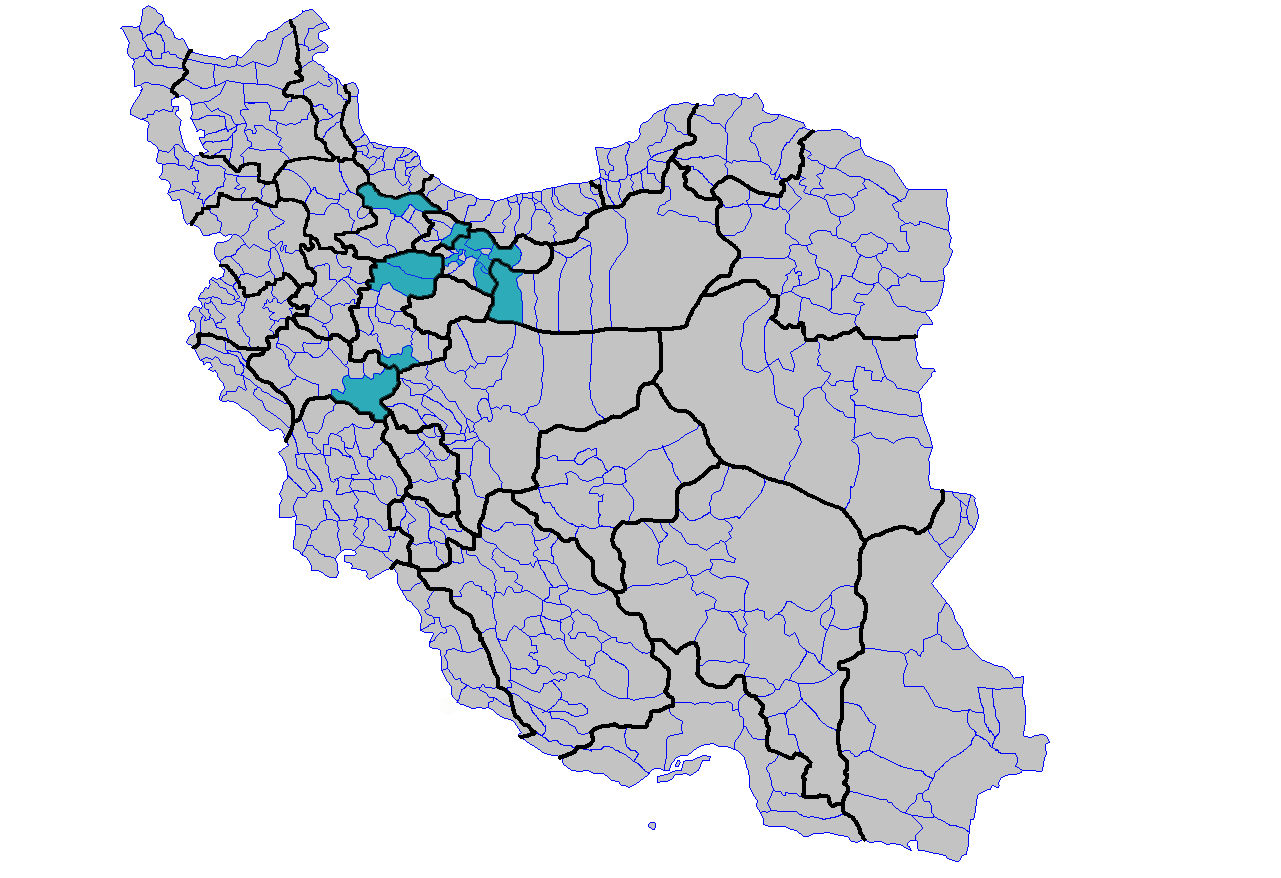
- Hadavand tribe on county level

Total population
- 2529 in 2009 (Nomadic only)

Languages
- Lori (Balagereyve Dialect) and Persian

Religion
- Predominantly Shi'a Islam

Related ethnic groups
- Other Iranian peoples

The Hadavand tribe (/hædɑːˈvænd/; Persian: ایلِ هَداوَند also Romanized as Hedāvand or Hedawand) is a Lur tribe residing in Tehran province and adjacent regions.

== Dispersion ==
Hadavand people mostly live in Tehran province, specially in Varamin region, including Varamin, Pishva, Pakdasht, Qarchak, other regions in Tehran province such as Shemiranat, Damavand, Robat Karim, Tehran, Karaj and Lar. There is also a Hadavand population in Garmsar in Semnan province.

== Population ==
Hadavand population have been as follows:

Year	19th century	1932	1973	1987	1998	2009
Population	3000	2500	700	2692 (Nomadic only)	2357 (Nomadic only)	2529 (Nomadic only)

== Origins and history ==
Hadavand people have been categorized as a branch of Lor people. In Landlord and peasant in Persia, Ann Lambton mentions Hadavand people as nomad people originally from Khorramabad. also in the book Rustic & tribal weaves from Varamin, Parviz Tanavoli mentions Hadavands as Lor people while comparing Hadavand weaves with people of Lorestan and also quoting the oral history of the Hadavand as told they were a tribe who were moved from Lorestan to Fars by Karim Khan Zand and then moved to Tehran by Agha Mohammad Khan Qajar A similar version of the migration story is mentioned by Iraj Afshar Sistani in his book, Moqaddame-i bar shenakht-e il-ha, chadorneshinan va tavayef-e Iran (transl. Introduction to recognition of Nomads, Tent-dwellers and Tribes of Iran). In the book, Contemporary Society: Tribal Studies, Hadavand is categorized as Lur-i Kuchak branch of Lor people. Iranica also mentions Hadavands as Lor people. There is also a mention of a Kurdish origin by Masoud Keyhan and a Lak origin.

== Culture ==
William O. Douglas narrates in his book Strange Lands and Friendly People about his encounter with the Hadavand tribe. The tribe is described as 75 families living in tents while a khan or a chief leads the tribe. He describes a Hadavand welcoming ceremony which includes a copper tray filled with hot coals raised to the guest. He describes Hadavand women as unveiled and, though shy and retiring, friendly. He mentions that economically Hadavands are dependent on goats, sheep, their dairy products and exchange of the produce with adjacent towns and cities.

== Subdivisions ==
Hadavands were originally divided into three main tâyefes (Persian: طایفه; clan), each subsequently divided into groups known as tire (Persian: تیره). Nowadays, the name of the tribe, tâyefe, tire, or a combination of them makes up common surnames of Hadavands.

Tayefe	Tire	Residence
Khâni	Shirkavand, Hadavandi, Sherkevand, Kelovand, Milakhor, Selkvand, Feili, Atabaki, Akbari, Mohammado, Keovand, Purjavan, Hajiha, Zomorrodi, Qasemvand, Sabzalivand, Najafzade, Shadivand, Hadivand, Chabokvand, etc.	Varamin, Amrabad, Qeshlaq-e Amroabad, Kazemabad, Aliabad-e Khaleseh, Kheyrabad-e Khaleseh, Zerehdar, Chenar-e Arabha, Aligudarz, Khomeyn, Ashna Khvor, Deh-e Now، Vapileh and Kheshti Jan
Mirzâyi	Mirzavand, Nesieshahivand, Tahmasbvand, Shervivand, Naqdi, Mahivand Bizatvand, Sarlangvand, Khaleqi, Ahmadi, Khosravi, etc.	Sanjarian, Tarqian, Qeshlaq-e Jalilabad, Chaltesiyan, Mahmudabad-e Now, Mureh and Mohsenabad, Estalak, Bagh-e Komesh, Tamasha, Puinak and Palangavaz
Siri	Baseri, Qanbari, Fathi, Musavi, Noruzi, Qasemi, Qorbani, Morteza'ali, Hoseini, Suri, Ahmadi, Alivand, Pirgavand, Hoseinvand, Mamavand, Basegal, Gedavand, Geda'alivand, etc.	Pakdasht, Hesar-e Amir, Chehel Qez va Siah Darreh, Sangtarashan, Yebr, Towchal, Tehran, Ferunabad, Bagh-e Komesh, Yurdshah and Mamlu
