= Makan =

Makan may refer to:

- Makan (TV series), a Pakistani TV drama series
- Makan (name)
- Makan Map, an online atlas of Xinjiang
- Makan, Iran, a village
- Makan (Arabic: مكان, lit. 'A place'), the Arabic branding of the Israeli Public Broadcasting Corporation
  - Makan 33, an Arabic-language Israeli television channel
  - Radio Makan, an Arabic-language Israeli radio station

== See also ==
- Maken (disambiguation)
- Makkan (disambiguation)
- Macan, a surname
- Maccan, a community in Canada
- Mackan, a townland in Ireland
