= Mahurzan =

Neighborhood in Markazi province, Iran

Mahurzan Persian: ماهورزان
- Neighborhood
- Location within Iran
- Coordinates: 33°49′35″N 50°04′44″E
- Country: Iran
- Province: Markazi
- County: Khomeyn
- District: Central
- Rural District: Hamzehlu
- Village: Sedeh Hamzehlu

Population (2011)
  - Total: 101
- Time zone: UTC+3:30 (IRST)

Mahurzan (Persian: ماهورزان) (Note: Also romanized as Māhūrzān; also known as Māhūrestān) is a neighborhood in the village of Sedeh Hamzehlu in Hamzehlu Rural District of the Central District in Khomeyn County, Markazi province, Iran.

== Demographics ==
=== Population ===
At the time of the 2006 National Census, Mahurzan's population was 174 in 48 households, when it was a village in Hamzehlu Rural District. The following census in 2011 counted 101 people in 31 households.

In 2011, the villages of Mahurzan, Pandar Jan, and Senjedak in Hamzehlu Rural District were merged to form the new village of Sedeh Hamzehlu.
