= Pandar Jan =

Neighborhood in Markazi province, Iran

Pandar Jan Persian: پندرجان
- Neighborhood
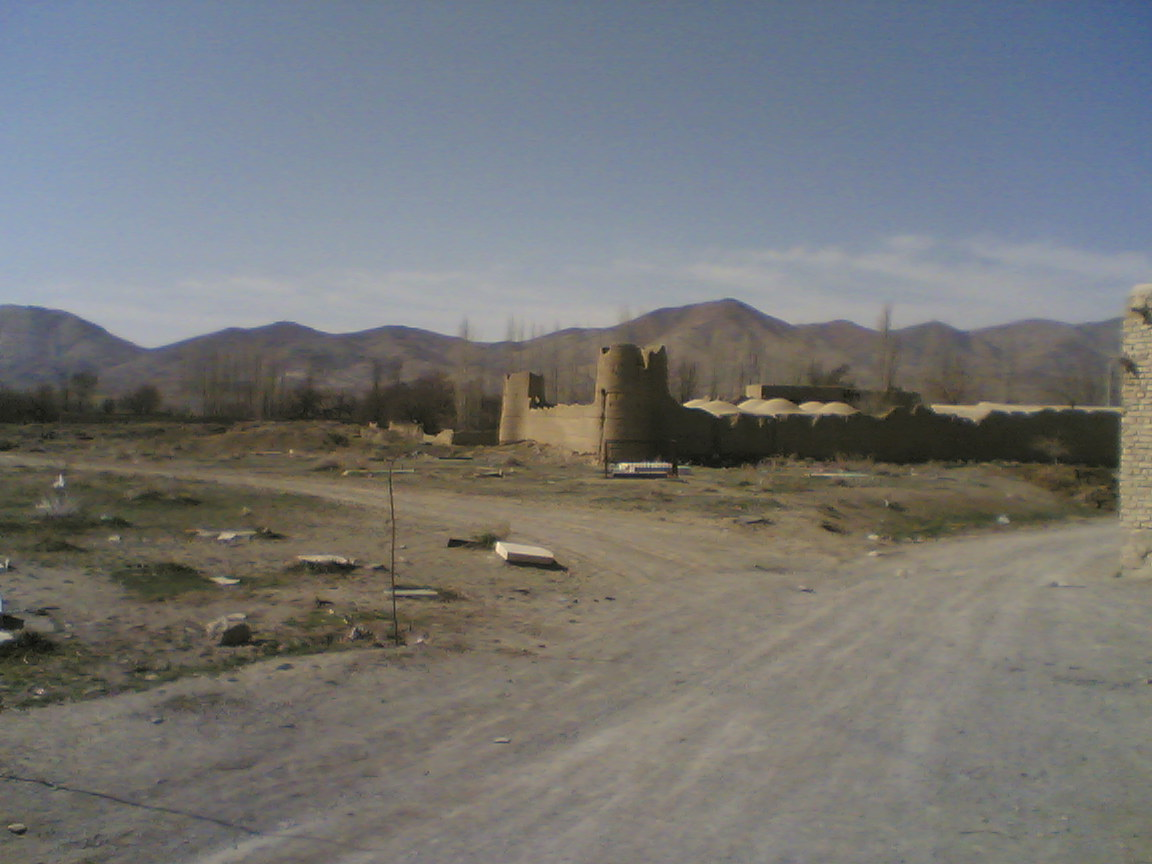
- Old fort with small holes for manual Brno guns in the neighborhood of Pandar Jan in the village of Sedeh Hamzehlu

- Location within Iran
- Coordinates: 33°49′33″N 50°04′34″E
- Country: Iran
- Province: Markazi
- County: Khomeyn
- District: Central
- Rural District: Hamzehlu
- Village: Sedeh Hamzehlu

Population (2011)
  - Total: 49
- Time zone: UTC+3:30 (IRST)

Pandar Jan (Persian: پندرجان) (Note: Also romanized as Pandar Jān and Penderjān; also known as Pender John and Penderjohn) is a neighborhood in the village of Sedeh Hamzehlu in Hamzehlu Rural District of the Central District in Khomeyn County, Markazi province, Iran.

== Demographics ==
=== Population ===
At the time of the 2006 National Census, Pandar Jan's population was 67 in 18 households, when it was a village in Hamzehlu Rural District. The following census in 2011 counted 49 people in 20 households.

In 2011, the villages of Mahurzan, Pandar Jan, and Senjedak in Hamzehlu Rural District were merged to form the new village of Sedeh Hamzehlu.

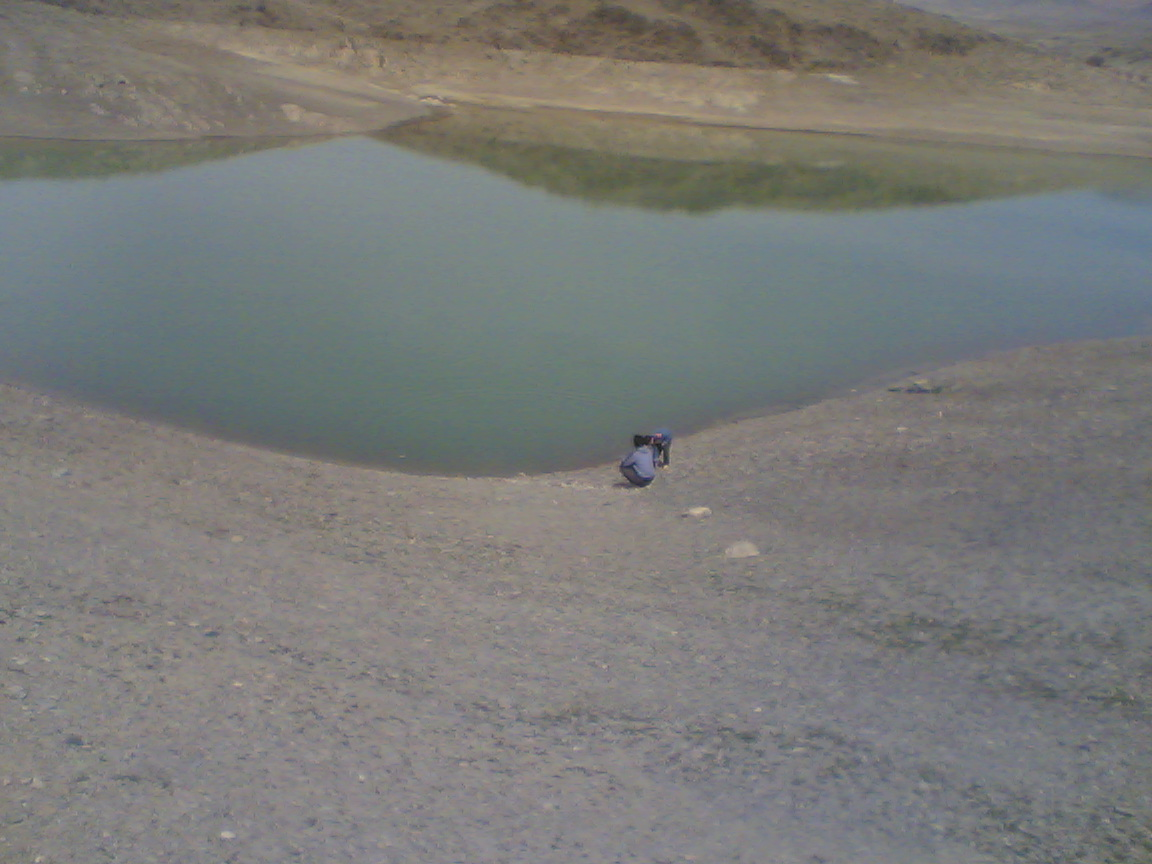
An artificial lake made from underground qanats

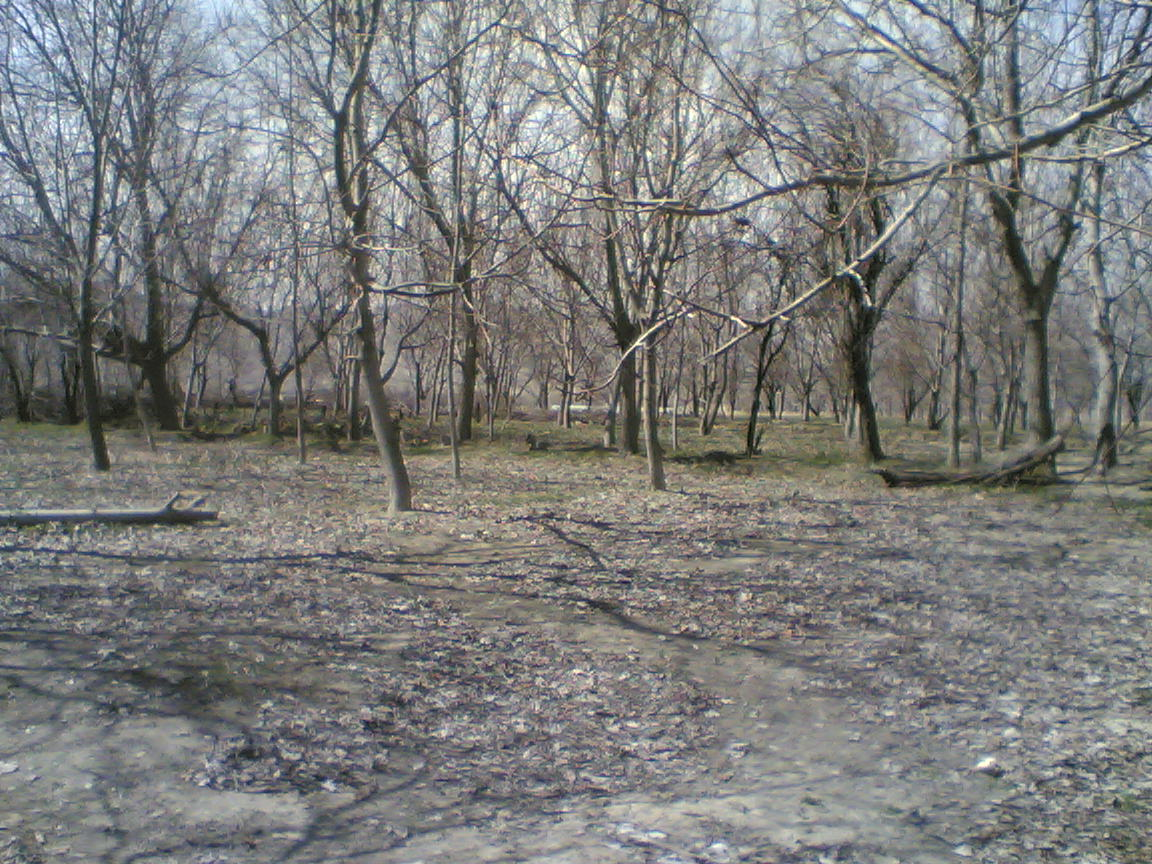
A garden

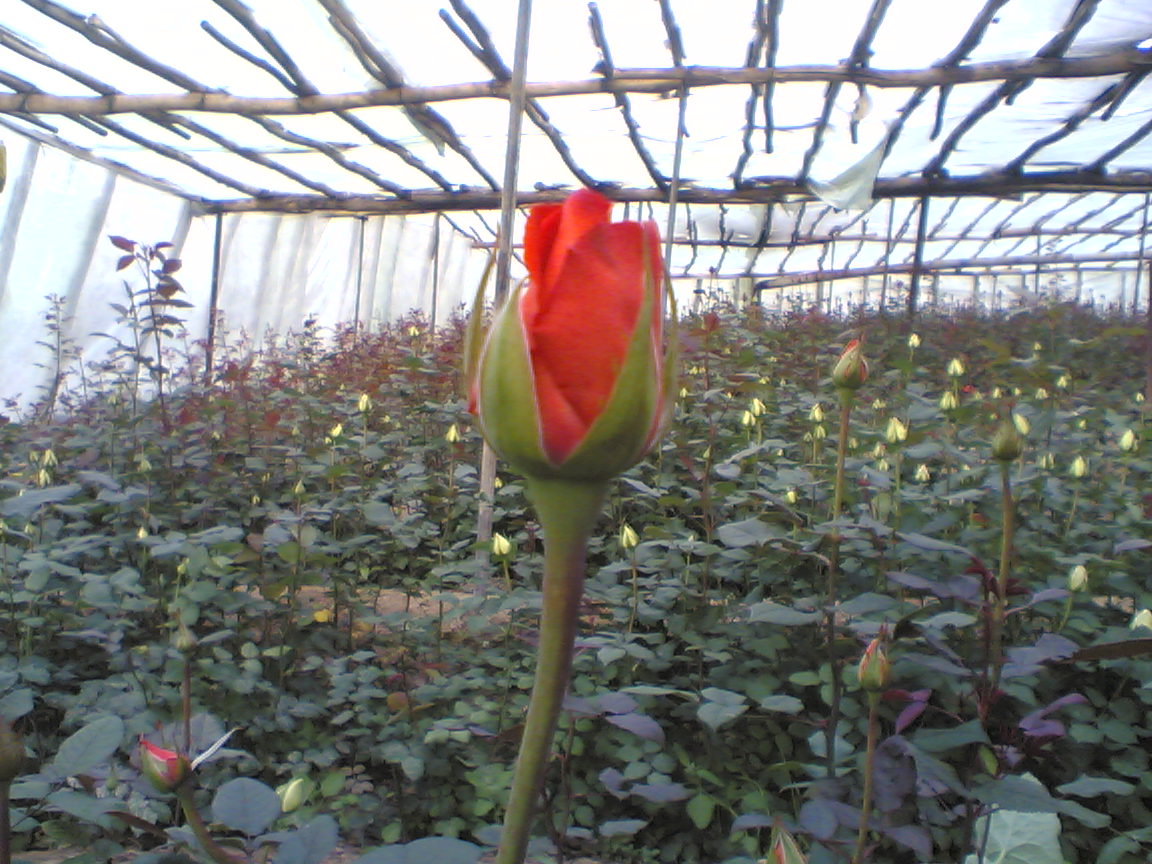
A rose garden

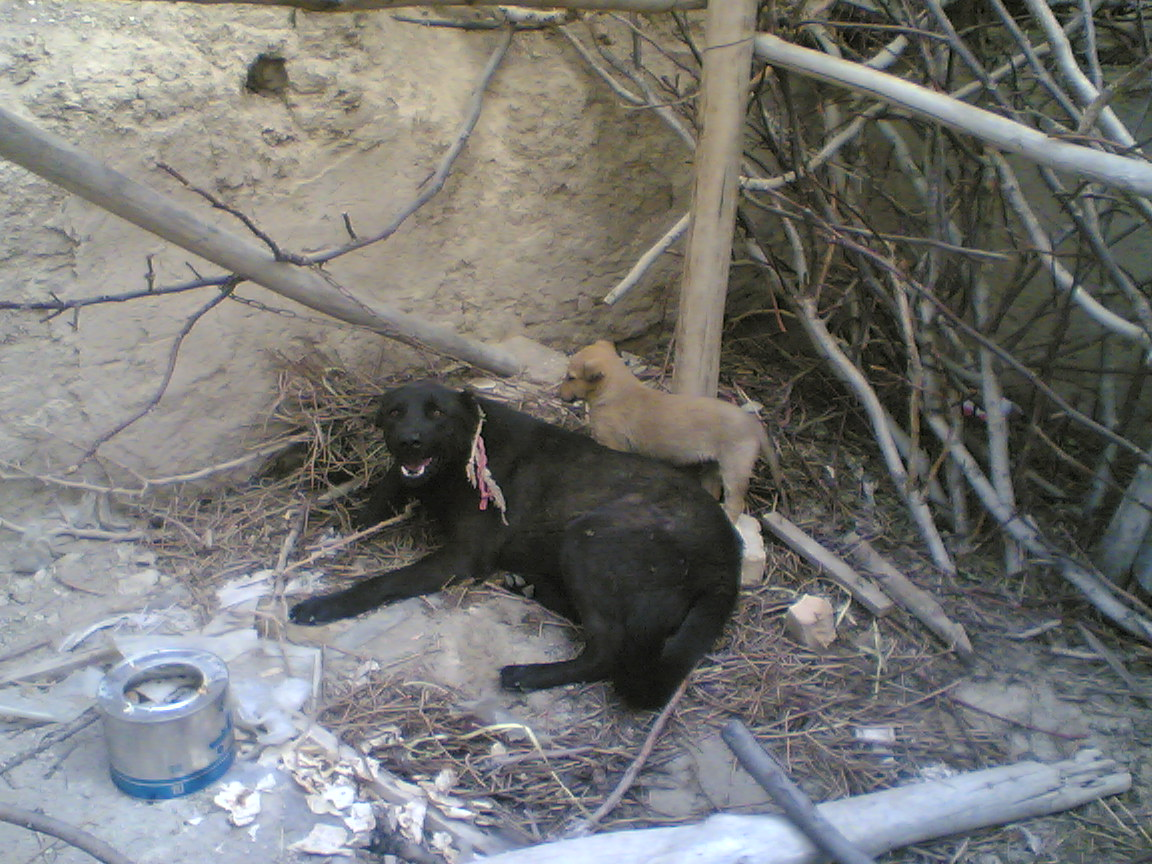
Dogs used to protect sheep from mountain wolves

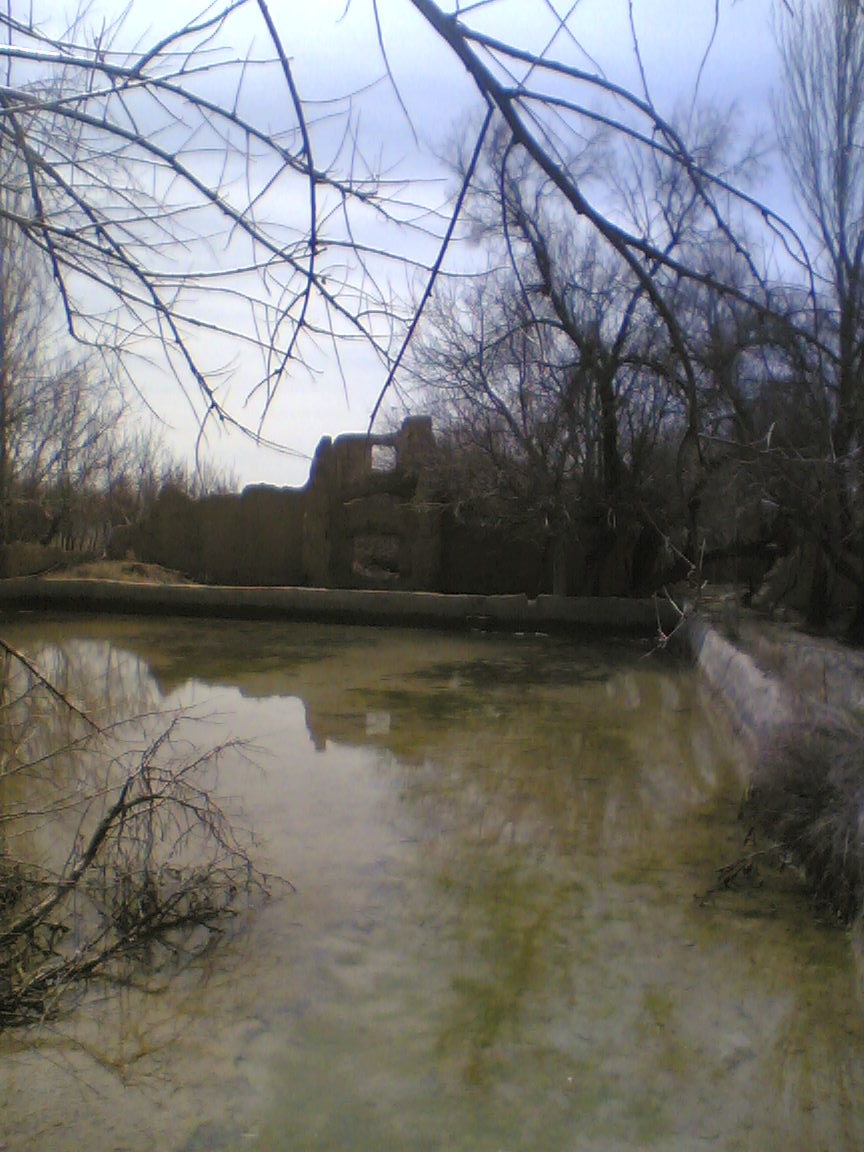
A small pool for fish
