= Senjedak, Markazi =

Neighborhood in Markazi province, Iran

Senjedak Persian: سنجدك
- Neighborhood
- Location within Iran
- Coordinates: 33°49′45″N 50°04′17″E
- Country: Iran
- Province: Markazi
- County: Khomeyn
- District: Central
- Rural District: Hamzehlu
- Village: Sedeh Hamzehlu

Population (2011)
  - Total: 74
- Time zone: UTC+3:30 (IRST)

Senjedak (Persian: سنجدك) is a neighborhood in the village of Sedeh Hamzehlu in Hamzehlu Rural District of the Central District in Khomeyn County, Markazi province, Iran.

== Demographics ==
=== Population ===
At the time of the 2006 National Census, Senjedak's population was 108 in 33 households, when it was a village in Hamzehlu Rural District. The following census in 2011 counted 74 people in 29 households.

In 2011, the villages of Mahurzan, Pandar Jan, and Senjedak in Hamzehlu Rural District were merged to form the new village of Sedeh Hamzehlu.
