= Ali Abad Japlogh =

Ali Abad Japlogh (Persian: علی‌آباد جاپلق) may refer to:

- Aliabad, Azna, Lorestan Province
- Aliabad, Ashna Khvor, Markazi Province
- Aliabad, Kamareh, Markazi Province
