= Gusheh-ye Mohammad Malek =

Village in Markazi province, Iran

Gusheh-ye Mohammad Malek Persian: گوشه محمدمالك
- Village
- Location within Iran
- Coordinates: 33°36′17″N 49°58′38″E
- Country: Iran
- Province: Markazi
- County: Khomeyn
- District: Central
- Rural District: Rostaq

Population (2016)
  - Total: 317
- Time zone: UTC+3:30 (IRST)

Gusheh-ye Mohammad Malek (Persian: گوشه محمدمالك) (Note: Also romanized as Goosheh Mohammad Malek, Gūsheh-ye Moḩammad Mālek, and Gūsheh-ye Moḩammad-e Malek) is a village in Rostaq Rural District of the Central District in Khomeyn County, Markazi province, Iran.

== Demographics ==
=== Population ===
At the time of the 2006 National Census, the village's population was 398 in 101 households. The following census in 2011 counted 368 people in 118 households. The 2016 census measured the population of the village as 317 people in 118 households.
