= Aznowjan =

Village in Markazi province, Iran

Aznowjan Persian: ازنوجان
- Village
- Location within Iran
- Coordinates: 33°42′18″N 50°14′49″E
- Country: Iran
- Province: Markazi
- County: Khomeyn
- District: Central
- Rural District: Salehan

Population (2016)
  - Total: 606
- Time zone: UTC+3:30 (IRST)

Aznowjan (Persian: ازنوجان) (Note: Also romanized as Aznoojan, Aznowjān, and Aznūjān) is a village in Salehan Rural District of the Central District in Khomeyn County, Markazi province, Iran.

== Demographics ==
=== Population ===
At the time of the 2006 National Census, the village's population was 865 in 293 households. The following census in 2011 counted 698 people in 276 households. The 2016 census measured the population of the village as 606 people in 243 households.
