= Asadabad, Khomeyn =

Village in Markazi province, Iran

Asadabad Persian: اسداباد
- Village
- Location within Iran
- Coordinates: 33°39′51″N 50°08′57″E
- Country: Iran
- Province: Markazi
- County: Khomeyn
- District: Central
- Rural District: Galehzan

Population (2016)
  - Total: 125
- Time zone: UTC+3:30 (IRST)

Asadabad (Persian: اسداباد) (Note: Also romanized as Asadābād) is a village in Galehzan Rural District of the Central District in Khomeyn County, Markazi province, Iran.

== Demographics ==
=== Population ===
At the time of the 2006 National Census, the village's population was 174 in 57 households. The following census in 2011 counted 144 people in 50 households. The 2016 census measured the population of the village as 125 people in 45 households.
