= Reyhan-e Sofla =

Village in Markazi province, Iran

Reyhan-e Sofla Persian: ريحان سفلي
- Village
- Location within Iran
- Coordinates: 33°37′24″N 50°02′47″E
- Country: Iran
- Province: Markazi
- County: Khomeyn
- District: Central
- Rural District: Rostaq

Population (2016)
  - Total: 781
- Time zone: UTC+3:30 (IRST)

Reyhan-e Sofla (Persian: ريحان سفلي) (Note: Also romanized as Reyhan Sofla and Reyḩan-e Soflá; also known as Reyḩān-e Pā’īn) is a village in Rostaq Rural District of the Central District in Khomeyn County, Markazi province, Iran.

== Demographics ==
=== Population ===
At the time of the 2006 National Census, the village's population was 802 in 226 households. The following census in 2011 counted 761 people in 248 households. The 2016 census measured the population of the village as 781 people in 260 households.
