= Nasrabad, Markazi =

Village in Markazi province, Iran

Nasrabad Persian: نصراباد
- Village
- Location within Iran
- Coordinates: 33°29′02″N 49°55′48″E
- Country: Iran
- Province: Markazi
- County: Khomeyn
- District: Central
- Rural District: Ashna Khvor

Population (2016)
  - Total: 93
- Time zone: UTC+3:30 (IRST)

Nasrabad (Persian: نصراباد) (Note: Also romanized as Naşrābād) is a village in Ashna Khvor Rural District of the Central District in Khomeyn County, Markazi province, Iran.

== Demographics ==
=== Population ===
At the time of the 2006 National Census, the village's population was 184 in 48 households. The following census in 2011 counted 143 people in 42 households. The 2016 census measured the population of the village as 93 people in 31 households.
