= Poshtkuh, Markazi =

Village in Markazi province, Iran

Poshtkuh Persian: پشتكوه
- Village
- Location within Iran
- Coordinates: 33°36′48″N 49°58′06″E
- Country: Iran
- Province: Markazi
- County: Khomeyn
- District: Central
- Rural District: Rostaq

Population (2016)
  - Total: 338
- Time zone: UTC+3:30 (IRST)

Poshtkuh (Persian: پشتكوه) (Note: Also romanized as Poshtkūh; also known as Pushteh Kūh) is a village in Rostaq Rural District of the Central District in Khomeyn County, Markazi province, Iran.

== Demographics ==
=== Population ===
At the time of the 2006 National Census, the village's population was 360 in 78 households. The following census in 2011 counted 390 people in 112 households. The 2016 census measured the population of the village as 338 people in 109 households.
