= Khvorzan =

Village in Markazi province, Iran

Khvorzan Persian: خورزن
- Village
- Location within Iran
- Coordinates: 33°29′23″N 49°52′05″E
- Country: Iran
- Province: Markazi
- County: Khomeyn
- District: Central
- Rural District: Ashna Khvor

Population (2016)
  - Total: 17
- Time zone: UTC+3:30 (IRST)

Khvorzan (Persian: خورزن) (Note: Also romanized as Khūrzan; also known as Khorzan, Khūr Zand, Khuwarzah, Khvārzeh, and Khvorzand) is a village in Ashna Khvor Rural District of the Central District in Khomeyn County, Markazi province, Iran.

== Demographics ==
=== Population ===
At the time of the 2006 National Census, the village's population was 48 in nine households. The following census in 2011 counted 24 people in eight households. The 2016 census measured the population of the village as 17 people in seven households.
