= Zavarqan =

Zavarqan زورقان
- Village
- Location within Iran
- Coordinates: 33°42′19″N 50°14′10″E
- Country: Iran
- Province: Markazi
- County: Khomeyn
- Bakhsh: Central
- Rural District: Salehan

Population (2006)
  - Total: 137
- Time zone: UTC+3:30 (IRST)
  - Summer (DST): UTC+4:30 (IRDT)

Zavarqan (Persian: زورقان, also Romanized as Zavarqān; also known as Zavarbān) is a village in Salehan Rural District, in the Central District of Khomeyn County, Markazi Province, Iran. At the 2006 census, its population was 137, in 47 families.
