= Amiriyeh, Markazi =

Village in Markazi province, Iran

Amiriyeh Persian: اميريه
- Village
- Location within Iran
- Coordinates: 33°34′31″N 50°00′45″E
- Country: Iran
- Province: Markazi
- County: Khomeyn
- District: Central
- Rural District: Rostaq

Population (2016)
  - Total: 217
- Time zone: UTC+3:30 (IRST)

Amiriyeh (Persian: اميريه) (Note: Also romanized as Amīrīyeh; also known as Amiriyeh Hamzehloo and Zorashk (زرشك)) is a village in Rostaq Rural District of the Central District in Khomeyn County, Markazi province, Iran.

== Demographics ==
=== Population ===
At the time of the 2006 National Census, the village's population was 387 in 89 households. The following census in 2011 counted 276 people in 79 households. The 2016 census measured the population of the village as 217 people in 75 households.
