= Sian =

Sian or Siyan may refer to:

== People ==
- Siân, a Welsh girl's name; list of people with this name

== Places ==
- Sian, Iran (disambiguation), various places in Iran
- Sian, Russia, a rural locality in Amur Oblast, Russia
- Xi'an, China, formerly romanized as Sian
- Sen (river), Yakutia, Russian Federation
- Sian, the Ukrainian name of San (river) used in toponymics of Ukraine

== Other uses ==
- Lamborghini Sián FKP 37, an Italian sports car
- Sian (band), Scottish traditional music band
- Sian (crater), a crater on Mars
- Sian language, a Kajang language of Brunei and Sarawak
- SIANspheric, Canadian band formerly named Sian
- Stop Islamisation of Norway (Stopp islamiseringen av Norge, SIAN), a Norwegian anti-Islam group which was established in 2008
- Siyan, a Kurdish tribe

== See also ==
- Sain (disambiguation)
- Sihan language, a Papuan language of Papua New Guinea
- Syan language, a Bantu language spoken in East Africa
- Syan (disambiguation)
- Sayan (disambiguation)
