= Nurabad, Khomeyn =

Village in Markazi province, Iran

Nurabad Persian: نوراباد
- Village
- Country: Iran
- Province: Markazi
- County: Khomeyn
- District: Central
- Rural District: Ashna Khvor

Population (2016)
  - Total: 100
- Time zone: UTC+3:30 (IRST)

Nurabad (Persian: نوراباد) (Note: Also romanized as Nūrābād) is a village in Ashna Khvor Rural District of the Central District in Khomeyn County, Markazi province, Iran.

== Demographics ==
=== Population ===
At the time of the 2006 National Census, the village's population was 167 in 44 households. The following census in 2011 counted 124 people in 42 households. The 2016 census measured the population of the village as 100 people in 36 households.
