= Razan, Markazi =

Village in Markazi province, Iran

Razan Persian: رازان
- Village
- Location within Iran
- Coordinates: 33°39′45″N 50°07′15″E
- Country: Iran
- Province: Markazi
- County: Khomeyn
- District: Central
- Rural District: Salehan

Population (2016)
  - Total: 287
- Time zone: UTC+3:30 (IRST)

Razan (Persian: رازان) (Note: Also romanized as Rāzān; also known as Rāzāt) is a village in Salehan Rural District of the Central District in Khomeyn County, Markazi province, Iran.

== Demographics ==
=== Population ===
At the time of the 2006 National Census, the village's population was 353 in 103 households. The following census in 2011 counted 344 people in 111 households. The 2016 census measured the population of the village as 287 people in 100 households.
