= Robat-e Arjomand =

Village in Markazi province, Iran

Robat-e Arjomand Persian: رباط ارجمند
- Village
- Location within Iran
- Coordinates: 33°39′57″N 50°10′45″E
- Country: Iran
- Province: Markazi
- County: Khomeyn
- District: Central
- Rural District: Galehzan

Population (2016)
  - Total: 106
- Time zone: UTC+3:30 (IRST)

Robat-e Arjomand (Persian: رباط ارجمند) (Note: Also romanized as Robāţ-e Arjomand; also known as Robāţ-e Kaf Sān (رباط كفسان)) is a village in Galehzan Rural District of the Central District in Khomeyn County, Markazi province, Iran.

== Demographics ==
=== Population ===
At the time of the 2006 National Census, the village's population was 144 in 43 households. The following census in 2011 counted 135 people in 43 households. The 2016 census measured the population of the village as 106 people in 40 households.
