= Sokaneh, Markazi =

Sokaneh سكانه
- Village
- Location within Iran
- Coordinates: 33°36′05″N 49°51′48″E
- Country: Iran
- Province: Markazi
- County: Khomeyn
- Bakhsh: Central
- Rural District: Rostaq

Population (2006)
  - Total: 226
- Time zone: UTC+3:30 (IRST)
  - Summer (DST): UTC+4:30 (IRDT)

Sokaneh (Persian: سكانه, also Romanized as Sokāneh and Sokkāneh) is a village in Rostaq Rural District, in the Central District of Khomeyn County, Markazi Province, Iran. At the 2006 census, its population was 226, in 63 families.
