= Ashianeh =

Ashianeh or Ashiyaneh or Ashyaneh (Persian: اشيانه) may refer to:

- Ashianeh-ye Olya
- Ashianeh-ye Sofla

== See also ==
- Ashiyan (disambiguation)
