= Kheshti Jan =

Kheshti Jan خشتيجان
- Village
- Location within Iran
- Coordinates: 33°47′43″N 49°58′25″E
- Country: Iran
- Province: Markazi
- County: Khomeyn
- Bakhsh: Central
- Rural District: Hamzehlu

Population (2006)
  - Total: 103
- Time zone: UTC+3:30 (IRST)
  - Summer (DST): UTC+4:30 (IRDT)

Kheshti Jan (Persian: خشتيجان, also Romanized as Kheshtī Jān; also known as Khistijān) is a village in Hamzehlu Rural District, in the Central District of Khomeyn County, Markazi Province, Iran. At the 2006 census, its population was 103, in 32 families.
