= Mishijan =

Mishijan (Persian: ميشيجان), also rendered as Meyshi Jan, Mashijan, Mishajan, Mishjan, Moshian, or Mushijan, may refer to:

- Mishijan-e Olya
- Mishijan-e Sofla
