= Ashianeh-ye Olya =

Ashianeh-ye Olya اشيانه عليا
- Village
- Location within Iran
- Coordinates: 33°49′19″N 49°58′35″E
- Country: Iran
- Province: Markazi
- County: Khomeyn
- Bakhsh: Central
- Rural District: Hamzehlu

Population (2006)
  - Total: 113
- Time zone: UTC+3:30 (IRST)
  - Summer (DST): UTC+4:30 (IRDT)

Ashianeh-ye Olya (Persian: اشيانه عليا, also Romanized as Āshīāneh-ye ‘Olyā, Ashiyaneh Olyá, Āshyāneh ‘Olyā, and Āshiāneh Auliya; also known as Āshīāneh-ye Bālā) is a village in Hamzehlu Rural District, in the Central District of Khomeyn County, Markazi Province, Iran. At the 2006 census, its population was 113, in 28 families.
