= Reyhan-e Olya =

Village in Markazi province, Iran

Reyhan-e Olya Persian: ريحان عليا
- Village
- Location within Iran
- Coordinates: 33°37′06″N 50°02′22″E
- Country: Iran
- Province: Markazi
- County: Khomeyn
- District: Central
- Rural District: Rostaq

Population (2016)
  - Total: 376
- Time zone: UTC+3:30 (IRST)

Reyhan-e Olya (Persian: ريحان عليا) (Note: Also romanized as Reyhan Olya and Reyḩān-e ‘Olyā; also known as Reyhān, Reyhān Bālā, and Reyḩān-e Bālā) is a village in Rostaq Rural District of the Central District in Khomeyn County, Markazi province, Iran.

== Demographics ==
=== Population ===
At the time of the 2006 National Census, the village's population was 457 in 124 households. The following census in 2011 counted 428 people in 128 households. The 2016 census measured the population of the village as 376 people in 124 households.
