= Goldasht, Markazi =

Village in Markazi province, Iran

Goldasht Persian: گلدشت
- Village
- Location within Iran
- Coordinates: 33°42′53″N 50°11′53″E
- Country: Iran
- Province: Markazi
- County: Khomeyn
- District: Central
- Rural District: Salehan

Population (2016)
  - Total: 1,938
- Time zone: UTC+3:30 (IRST)

Goldasht (Persian: گلدشت) Also known as Shahabieh (Persian: شهابیه, and not to be mistaken with Shahabiyeh, a village with the same name), is a village in, and the capital of, Salehan Rural District in the Central District of Khomeyn County, Markazi province, Iran.

== Demographics ==
=== Population ===
At the time of the 2006 National Census, the village's population was 1,971 in 575 households. The following census in 2011 counted 1,873 people in 610 households. The 2016 census measured the population of the village as 1,938 people in 659 households, the most populous in its rural district.
