= Emamzadeh Varcheh =

Village in Markazi province, Iran

Emamzadeh Varcheh Persian: امامزاده ورچه
- Village
- Location within Iran
- Coordinates: 33°47′59″N 49°57′39″E
- Country: Iran
- Province: Markazi
- County: Khomeyn
- District: Central
- Rural District: Hamzehlu

Population (2016)
  - Total: 180
- Time zone: UTC+3:30 (IRST)

Emamzadeh Varcheh (Persian: امامزاده ورچه) (Note: Also romanized as Emāmzādeh Varcheh and Imāmzādeh Warcheh) is a village in Hamzehlu Rural District of the Central District in Khomeyn County, Markazi province, Iran.

== Demographics ==
=== Population ===
At the time of the 2006 National Census, the village's population was 342 in 109 households. The following census in 2011 counted 254 people in 98 households. The 2016 census measured the population of the village as 180 people in 83 households.
