= Darband-e Loran =

Village in Markazi province, Iran

Darband-e Loran Persian: دربندلران
- Village
- Location within Iran
- Coordinates: 33°32′11″N 49°59′11″E
- Country: Iran
- Province: Markazi
- County: Khomeyn
- District: Central
- Rural District: Rostaq

Population (2016)
  - Total: 255
- Time zone: UTC+3:30 (IRST)

Darband-e Loran (Persian: دربندلران) (Note: Also romanized as Darband-e Lorān; also known as Darband) is a village in Rostaq Rural District of the Central District in Khomeyn County, Markazi province, Iran.

== Demographics ==
=== Population ===
At the time of the 2006 National Census, the village's population was 420 in 123 households. The following census in 2011 counted 319 people in 112 households. The 2016 census measured the population of the village as 255 people in 110 households.
