= Varabad, Markazi =

Village in Markazi province, Iran

Varabad Persian: وراباد
- Village
- Location within Iran
- Coordinates: 33°41′39″N 50°10′04″E
- Country: Iran
- Province: Markazi
- County: Khomeyn
- District: Central
- Rural District: Salehan

Population (2016)
  - Total: 590
- Time zone: UTC+3:30 (IRST)

Varabad (Persian: وراباد) (Note: Also romanized as Varābād and Warābād) is a village in Salehan Rural District of the Central District in Khomeyn County, Markazi province, Iran.

== Demographics ==
=== Population ===
At the time of the 2006 National Census, the village's population was 881 in 271 households. The following census in 2011 counted 744 people in 270 households. The 2016 census measured the population of the village as 590 people in 229 households.
