= Khiz Ab =

Khiz Ab خيزاب
- Village
- Location within Iran
- Coordinates: 33°46′43″N 50°06′38″E
- Country: Iran
- Province: Markazi
- County: Khomeyn
- Bakhsh: Central
- Rural District: Hamzehlu

Population (2006)
  - Total: 106
- Time zone: UTC+3:30 (IRST)
  - Summer (DST): UTC+4:30 (IRDT)

Khiz Ab (Persian: خيزاب, also Romanized as Khīz Āb) is a village in Hamzehlu Rural District, in the Central District of Khomeyn County, Markazi Province, Iran. At the 2006 census, its population was 106, in 35 families.
