= Qarah Kahriz, Markazi =

Village in Markazi province, Iran

Qarah Kahriz Persian: قره كهريز
- Village
- Location within Iran
- Coordinates: 33°28′09″N 49°49′58″E
- Country: Iran
- Province: Markazi
- County: Khomeyn
- District: Central
- Rural District: Ashna Khvor

Population (2016)
  - Total: 929
- Time zone: UTC+3:30 (IRST)

Qarah Kahriz (Persian: قره كهريز) (Note: Also romanized as Qarah Kahrīz and Qareh Kahrīz) is a village in Ashna Khvor Rural District of the Central District in Khomeyn County, Markazi province, Iran.

== Demographics ==
=== Population ===
At the time of the 2006 National Census, the village's population was 966 in 211 households. The following census in 2011 counted 890 people in 225 households. The 2016 census measured the population of the village as 929 people in 232 households, the most populous in its rural district.
