= Aksabad =

Village in Markazi province, Iran

Aksabad Persian: عكس اباد
- Village
- Location within Iran
- Coordinates: 33°27′23″N 49°53′12″E
- Country: Iran
- Province: Markazi
- County: Khomeyn
- District: Central
- Rural District: Ashna Khvor

Population (2016)
  - Total: 102
- Time zone: UTC+3:30 (IRST)

Aksabad (Persian: عکس‌آباد) (Note: Also romanized as ‘Aksābād) is a village in Ashna Khvor Rural District of the Central District in Khomeyn County, Markazi province, Iran.

== Demographics ==
=== Population ===
At the time of the 2006 National Census, the village's population was 175 in 47 households. The following census in 2011 counted 143 people in 49 households. The 2016 census measured the population of the village as 102 people in 40 households.
