= Sedeh Hamzehlu =

Village in Markazi province, Iran

Sedeh Hamzehlu Persian: سده حمزه لو
- Village
- Location within Iran
- Coordinates: 33°49′35″N 50°04′31″E
- Country: Iran
- Province: Markazi
- County: Khomeyn
- District: Central
- Rural District: Hamzehlu
- Established: 2011

Population (2016)
  - Total: 202
- Time zone: UTC+3:30 (IRST)

Sedeh Hamzehlu (Persian: سده حمزه لو) (Note: Also romanized as Sedeh Ḩamzehlū) is a village in Hamzehlu Rural District of the Central District in Khomeyn County, Markazi province, Iran.

== History ==
In 2011, the villages of Mahurzan, Pandar Jan, and Senjedak in Hamzehlu Rural District were merged to form the new village of Sedeh Hamzehlu.

== Demographics ==
=== Population ===
At the time of the 2016 National Census, the village's population was 202 in 95 households.
