= Robat-e Morad =

Village in Markazi province, Iran

Robat-e Morad Persian: رباطمراد
- Village
- Location within Iran
- Coordinates: 33°40′17″N 50°16′01″E
- Country: Iran
- Province: Markazi
- County: Khomeyn
- District: Central
- Rural District: Galehzan

Population (2016)
  - Total: 1,415
- Time zone: UTC+3:30 (IRST)
- Website: www.robatmorad.ir

Robat-e Morad (Persian: رباطمراد) (Note: Also romanized as Robāţ-e Morād; also known as Robāt Murad, Shahkoobeh, Shahkūbeh, Shahkūyeh, and Shāku) is a village in, and the capital of, Galehzan Rural District in the Central District of Khomeyn County, Markazi province, Iran.

== Demographics ==
=== Population ===
At the time of the 2006 National Census, the village's population was 1,738 in 555 households. The following census in 2011 counted 1,688 people in 607 households. The 2016 census measured the population of the village as 1,415 people in 532 households, the most populous in its rural district.
