= Mishijan-e Sofla =

Mishijan-e Sofla ميشيجان سفلي
- Village
- Location within Iran
- Coordinates: 33°40′44″N 50°08′46″E
- Country: Iran
- Province: Markazi
- County: Khomeyn
- Bakhsh: Central
- Rural District: Salehan

Population (2006)
  - Total: 265
- Time zone: UTC+3:30 (IRST)
  - Summer (DST): UTC+4:30 (IRDT)

Mishijan-e Sofla (Persian: ميشيجان سفلي, also Romanized as Mīshījān-e Soflá; also known as Mashijan Sofla, Mīshjān-e Pāīn, Mīshjān-e Soflá, and Mushijān Pāīn) is a village in Salehan Rural District, in the Central District of Khomeyn County, Markazi Province, Iran. At the 2006 census, its population was 265, in 76 families.
