= Jalmajerd-e Jadid =

Village in Markazi province, Iran

Jalmajerd-e Jadid Persian: جلماجردجديد
- Village
- Location within Iran
- Coordinates: 33°41′13″N 50°20′25″E
- Country: Iran
- Province: Markazi
- County: Khomeyn
- District: Central
- Rural District: Galehzan

Population (2016)
  - Total: 473
- Time zone: UTC+3:30 (IRST)

Jalmajerd-e Jadid (Persian: جلماجردجديد) (Note: Also romanized as Jalmājerd-e Jadīd, Jolmājerd Jadīd, and Jolmājerd-e Jadīd; also known as Jalmājerd) is a village in Galehzan Rural District of the Central District in Khomeyn County, Markazi province, Iran.

== Demographics ==
=== Population ===
At the time of the 2006 National Census, the village's population was 798 in 267 households. The following census in 2011 counted 649 people in 218 households. The 2016 census measured the population of the village as 473 people in 200 households.
