= Mazayen =

Village in Markazi province, Iran

Mazayen Persian: مزاين
- Village
- Location within Iran
- Coordinates: 33°40′01″N 50°19′19″E
- Country: Iran
- Province: Markazi
- County: Khomeyn
- District: Central
- Rural District: Galehzan

Population (2016)
  - Total: 121
- Time zone: UTC+3:30 (IRST)

Mazayen (Persian: مزاين) (Note: Also romanized as Mazāyen; also known as Marāyen) is a village in Galehzan Rural District of the Central District in Khomeyn County, Markazi province, Iran.

== Demographics ==
=== Population ===
At the time of the 2006 National Census, the village's population was 271 in 89 households. The following census in 2011 counted 185 people in 63 households. The 2016 census measured the population of the village as 121 people in 59 households.
