= Farnaq, Khomeyn =

Village in Markazi province, Iran

Farnaq Persian: فرنق
- Village
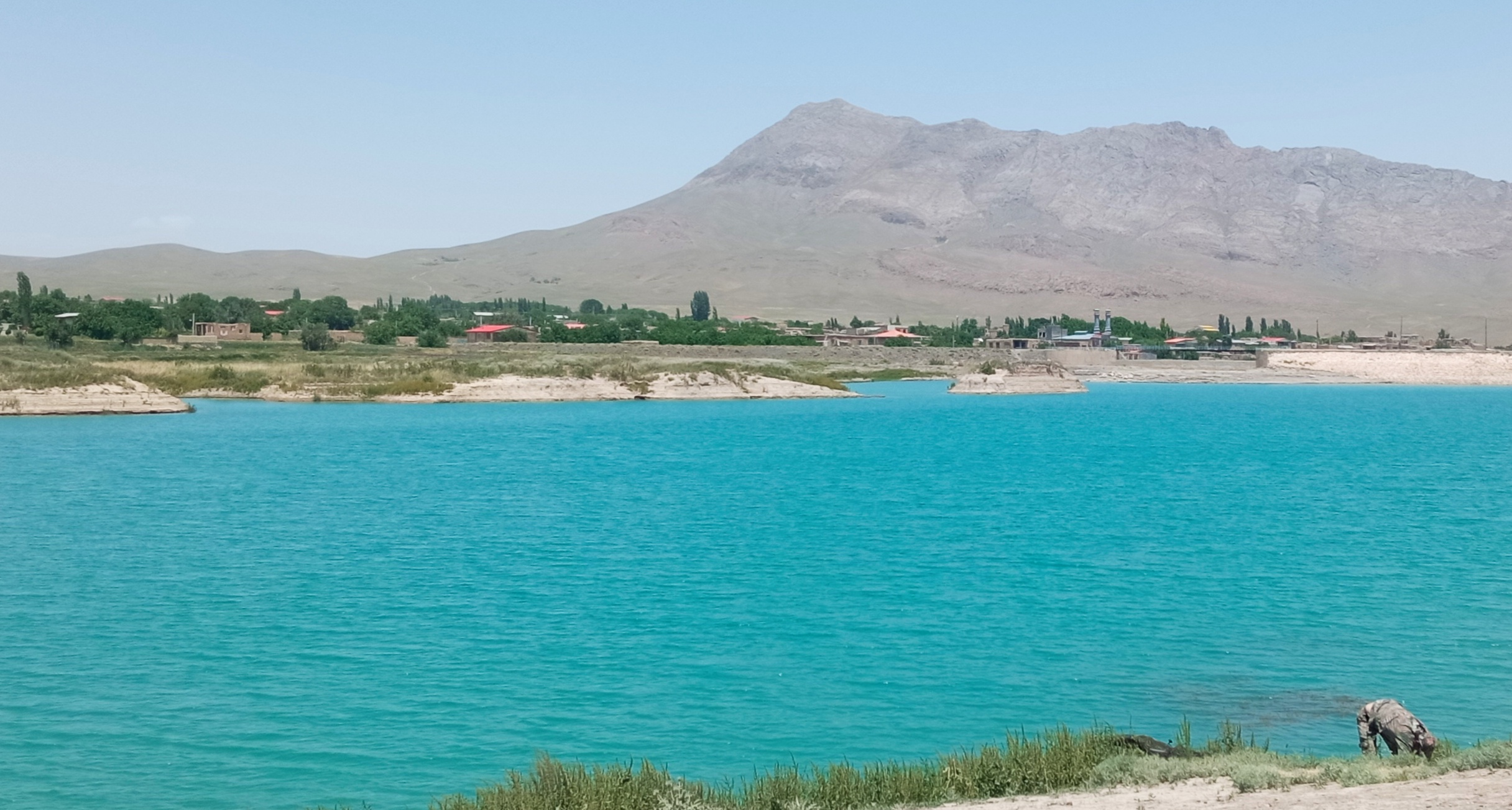
- The village of Farnaq in 2024

- Location within Iran
- Coordinates: 33°31′03″N 49°57′15″E
- Country: Iran
- Province: Markazi
- County: Khomeyn
- District: Central
- Rural District: Rostaq

Population (2016)
  - Total: 1,245
- Time zone: UTC+3:30 (IRST)

Farnaq (Persian: فرنق) (Note: Also known as Farnagh) is a village in, and the capital of, Rostaq Rural District in the Central District of Khomeyn County, Markazi province, Iran.

== Demographics ==
=== Population ===
At the time of the 2006 National Census, the village's population was 1,535 in 393 households. The following census in 2011 counted 1,477 people in 420 households. The 2016 census measured the population of the village as 1,245 people in 392 households, the most populous in its rural district.
