= Qaleh-ye Ashna Khvor =

Village in Markazi province, Iran

Qaleh-ye Ashna Khvor Persian: قلعه اشناخور
- Village
- Location within Iran
- Coordinates: 33°28′07″N 49°55′29″E
- Country: Iran
- Province: Markazi
- County: Khomeyn
- District: Central
- Rural District: Ashna Khvor

Population (2016)
  - Total: 208
- Time zone: UTC+3:30 (IRST)

Qaleh-ye Ashna Khvor (Persian: قلعه اشناخور) (Note: Also romanized as Qal‘eh-ye Āshnā Khvor; also known as Qal‘eh) is a village in Ashna Khvor Rural District of the Central District in Khomeyn County, Markazi province, Iran.

== Demographics ==
=== Population ===
At the time of the 2006 National Census, the village's population was 226 in 56 households. The following census in 2011 counted 230 people in 59 households. The 2016 census measured the population of the village as 208 people in 63 households.
