= Hoseynabad, Khomeyn =

Village in Markazi province, Iran

Hoseynabad Persian: حسين اباد
- Village
- Location within Iran
- Coordinates: 33°26′33″N 49°56′14″E
- Country: Iran
- Province: Markazi
- County: Khomeyn
- District: Central
- Rural District: Ashna Khvor

Population (2016)
  - Total: 160
- Time zone: UTC+3:30 (IRST)

Hoseynabad (Persian: حسين اباد) (Note: Also romanized as Hosein Abad and Ḩoseynābād) is a village in Ashna Khvor Rural District of the Central District in Khomeyn County, Markazi province, Iran.

== Demographics ==
=== Population ===
At the time of the 2006 National Census, the village's population was 236 in 53 households. The following census in 2011 counted 188 people in 47 households. The 2016 census measured the population of the village as 160 people in 46 households.
