= Tonjaran =

Village in Markazi province, Iran

Tonjaran Persian: تانجران
- Village
- Location within Iran
- Coordinates: 33°39′34″N 50°06′39″E
- Country: Iran
- Province: Markazi
- County: Khomeyn
- District: Central
- Rural District: Salehan

Population (2016)
  - Total: 353
- Time zone: UTC+3:30 (IRST)

Tonjaran (Persian: تانجران) (Note: Also romanized as Ţonjarān; also known as Tongarān) is a village in Salehan Rural District of the Central District in Khomeyn County, Markazi province, Iran.

== Demographics ==
=== Population ===
At the time of the 2006 National Census, the village's population was 414 in 108 households. The following census in 2011 counted 324 people in 95 households. The 2016 census measured the population of the village as 353 people in 126 households.
