= Kaf San =

Village in Markazi province, Iran

Kaf San Persian: كفسان
- Village
- Location within Iran
- Coordinates: 33°39′57″N 50°10′06″E
- Country: Iran
- Province: Markazi
- County: Khomeyn
- District: Central
- Rural District: Galehzan

Population (2016)
  - Total: 368
- Time zone: UTC+3:30 (IRST)

Kaf San (Persian: كفسان) (Note: Also romanized as Kaf Sān; also known as Kabsān and Robāt-e Kafsān) is a village in Galehzan Rural District of the Central District in Khomeyn County, Markazi province, Iran.

== Demographics ==
=== Population ===
At the time of the 2006 National Census, the village's population was 484 in 135 households. The following census in 2011 counted 383 people in 116 households. The 2016 census measured the population of the village as 368 people in 128 households.
