= Farajabad, Khomeyn =

Village in Markazi province, Iran

Farajabad Persian: فرج اباد
- Village
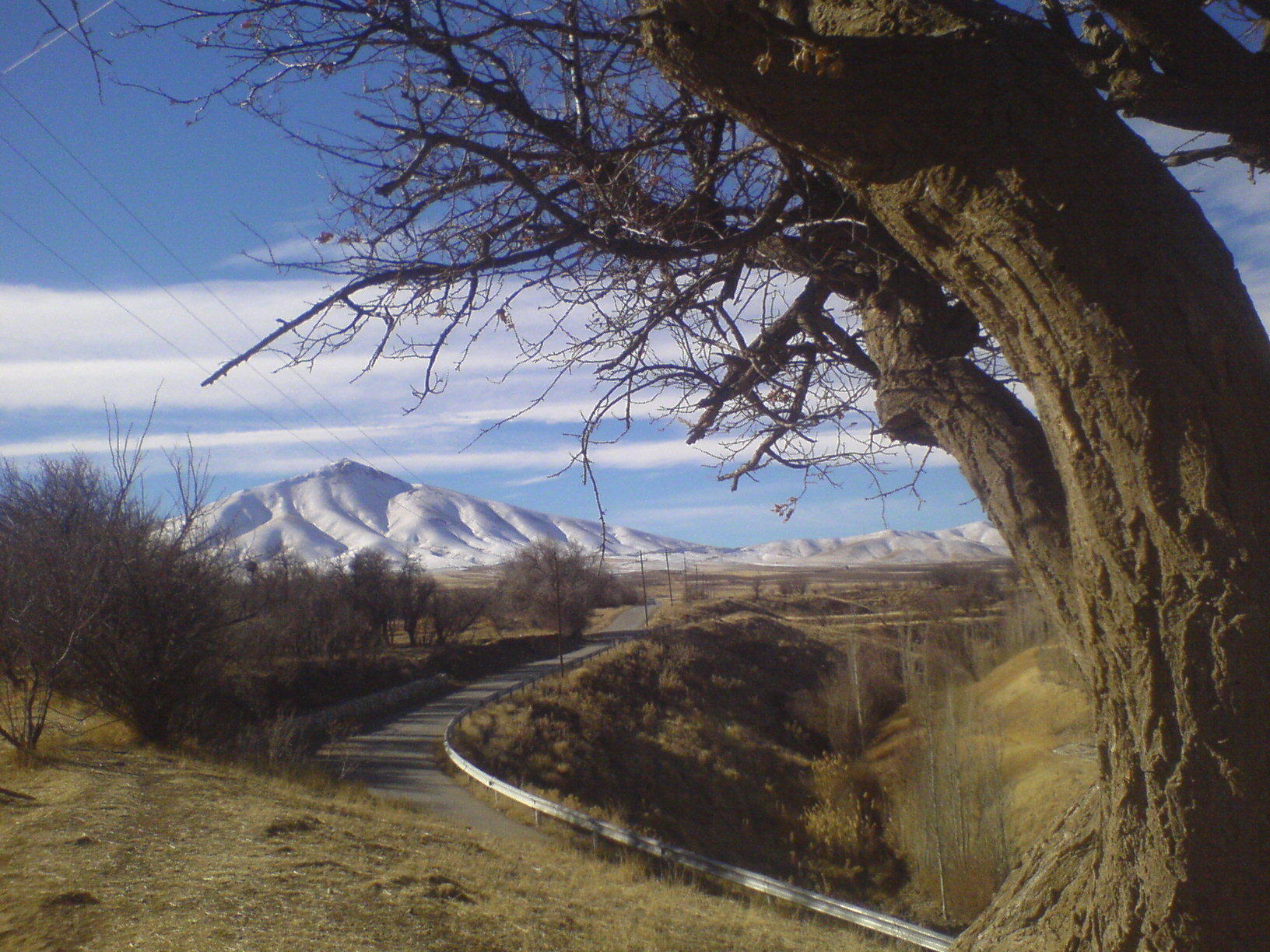
- Landscape near the village of Farajabad

- Location within Iran
- Coordinates: 33°27′43″N 49°52′15″E
- Country: Iran
- Province: Markazi
- County: Khomeyn
- District: Central
- Rural District: Ashna Khvor

Population (2016)
  - Total: 404
- Time zone: UTC+3:30 (IRST)

Farajabad (Persian: فرج اباد) (Note: Also romanized as Farajābād) is a village in Ashna Khvor Rural District of the Central District in Khomeyn County, Markazi province, Iran.

== Demographics ==
=== Population ===
At the time of the 2006 National Census, the village's population was 656 in 156 households. The following census in 2011 counted 529 people in 150 households. The 2016 census measured the population of the village as 404 people in 136 households.
