= Rashidabad, Markazi =

Village in Markazi province, Iran

Rashidabad Persian: رشيد آباد
- Village
- Location within Iran
- Coordinates: 33°39′05″N 50°07′12″E
- Country: Iran
- Province: Markazi
- County: Khomeyn
- District: Central
- Rural District: Galehzan

Population (2016)
  - Total: 259
- Time zone: UTC+3:30 (IRST)

Rashidabad (Persian: رشيد آباد) (Note: Also romanized as Rashīdābād; also known as Rashīdābād-e ‘Olyā) is a village in Galehzan Rural District of the Central District in Khomeyn County, Markazi province, Iran.

== Demographics ==
=== Population ===
At the time of the 2006 National Census, the village's population was 290 in 78 households. The following census in 2011 counted 270 people in 79 households. The 2016 census measured the population of the village as 259 people in 81 households.
