= Rezaabad, Khomeyn =

Village in Markazi province, Iran

Rezaabad Persian: رضااباد
- Village
- Location within Iran
- Coordinates: 33°26′26″N 49°56′04″E
- Country: Iran
- Province: Markazi
- County: Khomeyn
- District: Central
- Rural District: Ashna Khvor

Population (2016)
  - Total: 140
- Time zone: UTC+3:30 (IRST)

Rezaabad (Persian: رضااباد) (Note: Also romanized as Reẕāābād) is a village in Ashna Khvor Rural District of the Central District in Khomeyn County, Markazi province, Iran.

== Demographics ==
=== Population ===
At the time of the 2006 National Census, the village's population was 217 in 52 households. The following census in 2011 counted 165 people in 47 households. The 2016 census measured the population of the village as 140 people in 40 households.
