= Jahan Qaleh =

Village in Markazi province, Iran

Jahan Qaleh Persian: جهان قلعه
- Village
- Location within Iran
- Coordinates: 33°46′15″N 50°04′33″E
- Country: Iran
- Province: Markazi
- County: Khomeyn
- District: Central
- Rural District: Hamzehlu

Population (2016)
  - Total: 145
- Time zone: UTC+3:30 (IRST)

Jahan Qaleh (Persian: جهان قلعه) (Note: Also romanized as Jahān Qal‘eh; also known as Jahan Ghal‘eh and Jān Qal‘eh) is a village in Hamzehlu Rural District of the Central District in Khomeyn County, Markazi province, Iran.

== Demographics ==
=== Population ===
At the time of the 2006 National Census, the village's population was 243 in 62 households. The following census in 2011 counted 184 people in 64 households. The 2016 census measured the population of the village as 145 people in 52 households.
