= Ashianeh-ye Sofla =

Ashianeh-ye Sofla اشيانه سفلي
- Village
- Location within Iran
- Coordinates: 33°49′55″N 49°59′36″E
- Country: Iran
- Province: Markazi
- County: Khomeyn
- Bakhsh: Central
- Rural District: Hamzehlu

Population (2006)
  - Total: 26
- Time zone: UTC+3:30 (IRST)
  - Summer (DST): UTC+4:30 (IRDT)

Ashianeh-ye Sofla (Persian: اشيانه سفلي, also Romanized as Āshīāneh-ye Soflá, Ashiyaneh Sofla, and Āshyāneh Soflá; also known as Āshiāneh and Āshīāneh-ye Pa’īn) is a village in Hamzehlu Rural District, in the Central District of Khomeyn County, Markazi Province, Iran.

At the 2006 census, its population was 26, in 10 families.
