= Farfahan =

Village in Markazi province, Iran

Farfahan Persian: فرفهان
- Village
- Location within Iran
- Coordinates: 33°40′44″N 50°04′37″E
- Country: Iran
- Province: Markazi
- County: Khomeyn
- District: Central
- Rural District: Hamzehlu

Population (2016)
  - Total: 698
- Time zone: UTC+3:30 (IRST)

Farfahan (Persian: فرفهان) (Note: Also romanized as Farfahān) is a village in Hamzehlu Rural District of the Central District in Khomeyn County, Markazi province, Iran.

== Demographics ==
=== Population ===
At the time of the 2006 National Census, the village's population was 841 in 232 households. The following census in 2011 counted 831 people in 256 households. The 2016 census measured the population of the village as 698 people in 247 households, the most populous in its rural district.
