= Sian, Iran =

Sian, Seyan or Siyan (Persian: سيان) may refer to:

- Sian, Jarqavieh Sofla, Isfahan County, Isfahan province
- Sian, Harand, Harand County, Isfahan province
- Sian-e Olya, Markazi province
- Sian-e Sofla, Markazi province
