= FKF =

FKF may refer to:

- Fast Kalman filter
- Football Kenya Federation
- Free Knowledge Foundation, in Spain
- Fylkeskommunalt foretak, a county-municipal business enterprise in Norway
- Libertarian Municipal People (Swedish: Frihetliga Kommunalfolket), a Swedish political party
