= Aliabad, Ashna Khvor =

Village in Markazi province, Iran

Aliabad Persian: علي اباد
- Village
- Location within Iran
- Coordinates: 33°26′58″N 49°51′56″E
- Country: Iran
- Province: Markazi
- County: Khomeyn
- District: Central
- Rural District: Ashna Khvor

Population (2016)
  - Total: 32
- Time zone: UTC+3:30 (IRST)

Aliabad (علی‌آباد) (Note: Also romanized as ‘Alīābād; also known as Ali Abad Japlogh) is a village in Ashna Khvor Rural District of the Central District in Khomeyn County, Markazi province, Iran.

== Demographics ==
=== Population ===
At the time of the 2006 National Census, the village's population was 72 in 16 households. The following census in 2011 counted 59 people in 19 households. The 2016 census measured the population of the village as 32 people in 14 households.
