= Heshmatiyeh =

Heshmatiyeh (Persian: حشمتيه) may refer to:

- Heshmatiyeh, Fars
- Heshmatiyeh, Markazi
- Heshmatiyeh, Zeberkhan, Nishapur County, Razavi Khorasan Province
- Heshmatiyeh Prison
