= Sar Kubeh =

Village in Markazi province, Iran

Sar Kubeh Persian: سركوبه
- Village
- Location within Iran
- Coordinates: 33°47′42″N 50°05′36″E
- Country: Iran
- Province: Markazi
- County: Khomeyn
- District: Central
- Rural District: Hamzehlu

Population (2016)
  - Total: 180
- Time zone: UTC+3:30 (IRST)

Sar Kubeh (Persian: سركوبه) (Note: Also romanized as Sar Koobeh, Sar Kūbeh, and Ser Kūbeh) is a village in, and the capital of, Hamzehlu Rural District in the Central District of Khomeyn County, Markazi province, Iran.

== Demographics ==
=== Population ===
At the time of the 2006 National Census, the village's population was 300 in 92 households. The following census in 2011 counted 225 people in 87 households. The 2016 census measured the population of the village as 180 people in 74 households.
