= McMakin =

McMakin is a surname. Notable people with the surname include:

- John McMakin (baseball) (1878–1956), American baseball player
- John McMakin (born 1950), American football player
- Roy McMakin (born 1956), American furniture maker, artist, and architect
- Tom McMakin (born 1961), American writer and businessman

== See also ==
- McMackin
- McMaken
