= Maken =

Maken may refer to:

- Maken, West Virginia, a settlement in the US
- Maken X, a 1999 video game
- Makens, fictional entities in the Maken-ki! manga series
- Ajay Maken (born 1964)
- Lalit Maken (1951–1985)
- Shikha Maken, director of Bachelor Girls

== See also ==
- Macken (disambiguation)
- Mekan (disambiguation)
- Makan (disambiguation)
- Maqên County, in China
