= Chenar, Khomeyn =

Village in Markazi province, Iran

Chenar Persian: چنار
- Village
- Location within Iran
- Coordinates: 33°52′59″N 50°06′46″E
- Country: Iran
- Province: Markazi
- County: Khomeyn
- District: Central
- Rural District: Hamzehlu

Population (2016)
  - Total: 211
- Time zone: UTC+3:30 (IRST)

Chenar (Persian: چنار) (Note: Also romanized as Chenār) is a village in Hamzehlu Rural District of the Central District in Khomeyn County, Markazi province, Iran.

== Demographics ==
=== Population ===
At the time of the 2006 National Census, the village's population was 351 in 118 households. The following census in 2011 counted 227 people in 100 households. The 2016 census measured the population of the village as 211 people in 95 households.
