= Ashna Khvor =

Village in Markazi province, Iran

Ashna Khvor Persian: اشناخور
- Village
- Location within Iran
- Coordinates: 33°27′47″N 49°55′41″E
- Country: Iran
- Province: Markazi
- County: Khomeyn
- District: Central
- Rural District: Ashna Khvor

Population (2016)
  - Total: 583
- Time zone: UTC+3:30 (IRST)

Ashna Khvor (Persian: اشناخور) (Note: Also romanized as Āshenākhūr, Āshnā Khowr, and Āshnā Khvor; also known as Ashnakhor and Ashnokhur) is a village in Ashna Khvor Rural District of the Central District in Khomeyn County, Markazi province, Iran.

== Demographics ==
=== Population ===
At the time of the 2006 National Census, the village's population was 723 in 182 households. The following census in 2011 counted 733 people in 197 households. The 2016 census measured the population of the village as 583 people in 168 households.
