= Macken =

Macken may refer to:

- Macken, County Fermanagh, a hamlet in Northern Ireland
- Macken, Germany, a municipality in western Germany
- Macken (surname) (including a list of people with the name)
- Macken (TV series), Swedish sitcom
- Macken (song), song in the Swedish songbook Barnens svenska sångbok

== See also ==
- Maken (disambiguation)
- Mackan, a townland in County Cavan, Ireland
