= Syan =

Syan may refer to:

- Syan language, a Bantu language
- Sabrina Syan, Italian actress
- Syan Blake, British actress
- Sen (river), Yakutia, Russian Federation

== See also ==
- Sayan (disambiguation)
- Sian (disambiguation)
- Cyan (disambiguation)
