= Deh-e Now, Markazi =

Village in Markazi province, Iran

Deh-e Now Persian: دهنو
- Village
- Location within Iran
- Coordinates: 33°27′35″N 49°53′48″E
- Country: Iran
- Province: Markazi
- County: Khomeyn
- District: Central
- Rural District: Ashna Khvor

Population (2016)
  - Total: 858
- Time zone: UTC+3:30 (IRST)

Deh-e Now (Persian: دهنو) (Note: Also romanized as Deh-e Now; also known as Dehnow Japlogh and Shahrak-e Valī-ye ‘Aşr) is a village in, and the capital of, Ashna Khvor Rural District in the Central District of Khomeyn County, Markazi province, Iran.

== Demographics ==
=== Population ===
At the time of the 2006 National Census, the village's population was 1,206 in 313 households. The following census in 2011 counted 1,038 people in 321 households. The 2016 census measured the population of the village as 858 people in 292 households.
