= Mackmin =

Mackmin is a surname. Notable people with the surname include:

- Anna Mackmin (born 1964), English theatre director
- Sara Mackmin (born c. 1969), British Royal Air Force officer
- Scarlett Mackmin, English choreographer

== See also ==
- Mackin
