= Sokaneh =

Sokaneh or Sokkaneh (Persian: سكانه) may refer to:

- Sokaneh, Isfahan
- Sokaneh, Lorestan
- Sokaneh, Markazi
