= Heshmatiyeh, Markazi =

Village in Markazi province, Iran

Heshmatiyeh Persian: حشمتيه
- Village
- Location within Iran
- Coordinates: 33°35′32″N 50°00′42″E
- Country: Iran
- Province: Markazi
- County: Khomeyn
- District: Central
- Rural District: Rostaq

Population (2016)
  - Total: 421
- Time zone: UTC+3:30 (IRST)

Heshmatiyeh (Persian: حشمتيه) (Note: Also romanized as Ḩeshmatīyeh) is a village in Rostaq Rural District of the Central District in Khomeyn County, Markazi province, Iran.

== Demographics ==
=== Population ===
At the time of the 2006 National Census, the village's population was 757 in 244 households. The following census in 2011 counted 568 people in 210 households. The 2016 census measured the population of the village as 421 people in 184 households.
