= Sayan =

Sayan may refer to multiple geographical locations, personal names, and cultural references.

== Places ==
- Sayan Mountains, a mountain range in Siberia
- Sayan, India, a Village in Surat District.
- Sayan, Bali, a village in Indonesia
- Sayan, Iran, a village in Iran
- Sayán District, Peru

== Other uses ==
- Sayan (name)
- Sayana, 14th century Indian commentator on the Vedas
- The singular for sayanim, Jewish diaspora who provide logistical support for Mossad
- Saiyan, a fictional race featured in the Dragon Ball series

== See also ==
- Sayun, a city in the region and Governorate of Hadhramaut, Yemen
- Sayyan, a town in Yemen
- Syan (disambiguation)
- Sian (disambiguation)
