= Sian-e Olya =

Village in Markazi province, Iran

Sian-e Olya Persian: سيان عليا
- Village
- Location within Iran
- Coordinates: 33°50′22″N 50°01′38″E
- Country: Iran
- Province: Markazi
- County: Khomeyn
- District: Central
- Rural District: Hamzehlu

Population (2016)
  - Total: 224
- Time zone: UTC+3:30 (IRST)

Sian-e Olya (Persian: سيان عليا) (Note: Also romanized as Seyān ‘Olyā, Sīān ‘Olyā, Sīān-e ‘Olyā, and Sīyān Olyā; also known as Sīān Bāla and Sīān-e Bālā) is a village in Hamzehlu Rural District of the Central District in Khomeyn County, Markazi province, Iran.

== Demographics ==
=== Population ===
At the time of the 2006 National Census, the village's population was 283 in 98 households. The following census in 2011 counted 246 people in 89 households. The 2016 census measured the population of the village as 224 people in 91 households.
