= Behdasht =

Behdasht بهدشت
- Village
- Location within Iran
- Coordinates: 33°40′40″N 50°11′36″E
- Country: Iran
- Province: Markazi
- County: Khomeyn
- Bakhsh: Central
- Rural District: Galehzan

Population (2006bb)
  - Total: 165
- Time zone: UTC+3:30 (IRST)
  - Summer (DST): UTC+4:30 (IRDT)

Behdasht (Persian: بهدشت; also known as Behdast, Karmo, Karmu, Kermū, and Kirmu) is a village in Galehzan Rural District, in the Central District of Khomeyn County, Markazi Province, Iran. At the 2006 census, its population was 165, in 53 families.
