= Machon (surname) =

Machon or Machón is surname. Notable people with the surname include:

- Annie Machon (born 1968), British MI5 intelligence officer and whistle-blower
- Francisco Machón Vilanova (fl. 1948), Salvadorean novelist
- Franz Machon (1918–1968), German submariner
- James Machon (1848 – after 1864), English-born sailor who served in the U.S. Navy and was awarded the Medal of Honor
- James Machon (skier) (born 1990), British freestyle skier
- Martín Machón (born 1973), Guatemalan footballer
- Pablo Machón (active from 2006), Spanish activist for free software

== See also ==
- Machen (disambiguation)
- Machin (disambiguation)
