= Sian-e Sofla =

Village in Markazi province, Iran

Sian-e Sofla Persian: سيان سفلي
- Village
- Location within Iran
- Coordinates: 33°49′31″N 50°03′32″E
- Country: Iran
- Province: Markazi
- County: Khomeyn
- District: Central
- Rural District: Hamzehlu

Population (2016)
  - Total: 247
- Time zone: UTC+3:30 (IRST)

Sian-e Sofla (Persian: سيان سفلي) (Note: Also romanized as Seyān Soflá, Sīān-e Soflá, and Siyan Sofla; also known as Siān Pāīn and Sīān-e Pā’īn) is a village in Hamzehlu Rural District of the Central District in Khomeyn County, Markazi province, Iran.

== Demographics ==
=== Population ===
At the time of the 2006 National Census, the village's population was 422 in 117 households. The following census in 2011 counted 273 people in 94 households. The 2016 census measured the population of the village as 247 people in 91 households.
