= Mishijan-e Olya =

Village in Markazi province, Iran

Mishijan-e Olya Persian: ميشيجان عليا
- Village
- Location within Iran
- Coordinates: 33°40′40″N 50°07′33″E
- Country: Iran
- Province: Markazi
- County: Khomeyn
- District: Central
- Rural District: Salehan

Population (2016)
  - Total: 570
- Time zone: UTC+3:30 (IRST)

Mishijan-e Olya (Persian: ميشيجان عليا) (Note: Also romanized as Mīshījan ‘Olya and Mīshījān-e ‘Olyā; also known as Meyshī Jān, Mīshajān Bālā, Mīshjān-e Bālā, Mīshjān-e ‘Olyā, Mōshīān, and Mūshījān) is a village in Salehan Rural District of the Central District in Khomeyn County, Markazi province, Iran.

== Demographics ==
=== Population ===
At the time of the 2006 National Census, the village's population was 952 in 263 households. The following census in 2011 counted 679 people in 226 households. The 2016 census measured the population of the village as 570 people in 219 households.
