= Qeydu =

Village in Markazi province, Iran

Qeydu Persian: قيدو
- Village
- Location within Iran
- Coordinates: 33°39′49″N 50°18′52″E
- Country: Iran
- Province: Markazi
- County: Khomeyn
- District: Central
- Rural District: Galehzan

Population (2016)
  - Total: 166
- Time zone: UTC+3:30 (IRST)

Qeydu (Persian: قيدو) (Note: Also romanized as Qeydū; also known as Ghidoo, Kaidu, Kāydū, Key Dū, and Qedu) is a village in Galehzan Rural District of the Central District in Khomeyn County, Markazi province, Iran.

== Demographics ==
=== Population ===
At the time of the 2006 National Census, the village's population was 301 in 100 households. The following census in 2011 counted 197 people in 76 households. The 2016 census measured the population of the village as 166 people in 75 households.
