= Khoravand =

Village in Markazi province, Iran

Khoravand Persian: خوراوند
- Village
- Location within Iran
- Coordinates: 33°45′23″N 50°11′06″E
- Country: Iran
- Province: Markazi
- County: Khomeyn
- District: Central
- Rural District: Salehan

Population (2016)
  - Total: 288
- Time zone: UTC+3:30 (IRST)

Khoravand (Persian: خراوند) (Note: Also romanized as Kharāvand and Khorāvand; also known as Khowrāvand and Khvorāvand) is a village in Salehan Rural District of the Central District in Khomeyn County, Markazi province, Iran.

== Demographics ==
=== Population ===
At the time of the 2006 National Census, the village's population was 552 in 162 households. The following census in 2011 counted 392 people in 137 households. The 2016 census measured the population of the village as 288 people in 123 households.
