= Kaidu (disambiguation) =

Kaidu (1185–1241) was leader of the Mongol House of Ögedei and de facto khan of the Chagatai Khanate.

Kaidu may also refer to:

- Kaidu (11th century) (1025–1100), Mongol ruler of the Borjigin Clan
- Epp Kaidu (1915-1976), Estonian theatre director and actress
- Kaidu, Iran, a village
- Kaidu River, Xinjiang Uyghur Autonomous Region, China
