= Belaverjan =

Village in Markazi province, Iran

Belaverjan Persian: بلاورجان
- Village
- Location within Iran
- Coordinates: 33°49′01″N 50°06′58″E
- Country: Iran
- Province: Markazi
- County: Khomeyn
- District: Central
- Rural District: Hamzehlu

Population (2016)
  - Total: 208
- Time zone: UTC+3:30 (IRST)

Belaverjan (Persian: بلاورجان) (Note: Also romanized as Balāverjān and Belāvarjān; also known as Balādarjān) is a village in Hamzehlu Rural District of the Central District in Khomeyn County, Markazi province, Iran.

== Demographics ==
=== Population ===
At the time of the 2006 National Census, the village's population was 295 in 95 households. The following census in 2011 counted 232 people in 91 households. The 2016 census measured the population of the village as 208 people in 90 households.
