= Karmu =

Karmu may refer to:

- Kärmu, Estonia
- Karmu, Iran
