= Karmo =

Karmo may refer to:

- Karmo, Iran, a village in Markazi Province, Iran
- Alex Karmo (b. 1989), Liberian footballer
