= Free Knowledge Foundation =

Spanish-based organization

- Type: Charitable organization
- Founded: 2004
- Headquarters: Miraflores de la Sierra, Madrid, Spain
- Key people: Pablo Machón
- Website: www.libre.org (via archive.org)

The Free Knowledge Foundation (FKF; Spanish: Fundación Conocimiento Libre) is an organization aiming to promote Free Knowledge, including Free Software and Free Standards. It was founded in 2004 and is based in Madrid, Spain.

Pablo Machón has been FKF's president since 2004. In 2005, the Foundation appointed Richard Stallman as Patron of Honor.

In 2006 the FKF became an associate organization of the Free Software Foundation Europe.

== Libremeeting ==
FKF organizes LibreMeeting, the International Free Knowledge Meeting of Madrid. It is usually held at La Cristelera Residence, in the town of Miraflores de la Sierra, 50 km. away from Madrid.

The Foundation presents the libre.org awards at LibreMeeting. These awards are honored to people or organizations that promote free knowledge. Some of the recipients are:

- Juan Carlos Rodríguez Ibarra, Extremadura's former President
- Esteban González Pons, Spanish Popular Party's politician
- The Spanish Senate
- Juan Alberto Belloch, Spanish ex-minister of Justice and Interior and Mayor of Zaragoza
- The Junta de Andalucía (Andalusian Autonomous Government)
- The Generalitat Valenciana (Valencian Autonomous Government)
- The Spanish Ministry of Industry, Tourism and Trade

== Event participation and organization ==
The FKF organizes other events apart from Libremeeting, and participates with speakers at relevant international events related to Free Software and Free Knowledge.

== See also ==
- Open Knowledge Foundation
