= Macken (surname) =

Macken is a surname, and may refer to:

- Eddie Macken (born 1949), Irish equestrian
- Eoin Macken (born 1983), Irish actor and model
- Fidelma Macken (born 1942), Irish judge
- John Macken (c.1784–1823), Irish poet
- Jon Macken (born 1977), football manager
- Peter Macken (born 1938), Australian modern pentathlete and fencer
- Walter Macken (1915–1963), Irish writer

== See also ==
- Macken, County Fermanagh, a hamlet in Northern Ireland
- Mackin, a surname
- Machen (surname)
