= Machen (surname) =

Machen is a surname often but not always of Welsh origin (derived from the town Machen). Notable people with the surname include:

- Alwyn Machen (1901–1960), British trade union leader
- Arthur Machen (1863–1947), Welsh author and mystic, best known for his supernatural, fantasy and horror fiction
- Bernie Machen (born 1944), American academic, President of the University of Utah (1999–2003) and of the University of Florida (from 2003)
- Eddie Machen (1932–1972), American boxer
- Hervey Machen (1916–1994), U.S. Representative from Maryland 1965–69
- John Gresham Machen (1881–1937), American Presbyterian theologian
- Lewis H. Machen (1871–1927), American politician from Virginia
- Ronald Machen (born 1969), American lawyer, US Attorney for the District of Columbia 2010–15
- Thomas Machen (c. 1541–1614), English merchant who was three times mayor of Gloucester
- William H. Machen (1832–1911), Dutch painter and teacher who relocated to America
- Willis Benson Machen (1810–1893), U.S. Senator from Kentucky 1872–73

== See also ==
- Machen (disambiguation)
- Machin (disambiguation)
- Franz Machon (1918–1968), German submariner
- Mackem, an informal name for a person from Sunderland, England; and for the local accent, and for a follower of the local football team
