= McMaken =

McMaken is a surname. Notable people with the surname include:

- Rob McMaken (fl. 2001–), American musician
- William Vance McMaken (1857–1923), United States Army general

== See also ==
- McMakin
