= Machen (disambiguation) =

Machen is a village in South Wales.

Machen may also refer to:

- Lower Machen, a hamlet near Machen
- Machen RFC, a rugby union club based in Machen
- Machen (surname), various people
- Mynydd Machen, a hill located near Machen

== See also ==
- Bedwas, Trethomas and Machen, a community in the county borough of Caerphilly which includes Machen
- Banjarmasin, a city of Indonesia, written as 馬辰 or 马辰 for Chinese Mandarin
- Machin (disambiguation)
- Machon (disambiguation)
