= Great Harvest Bread Company =

American bakery chain

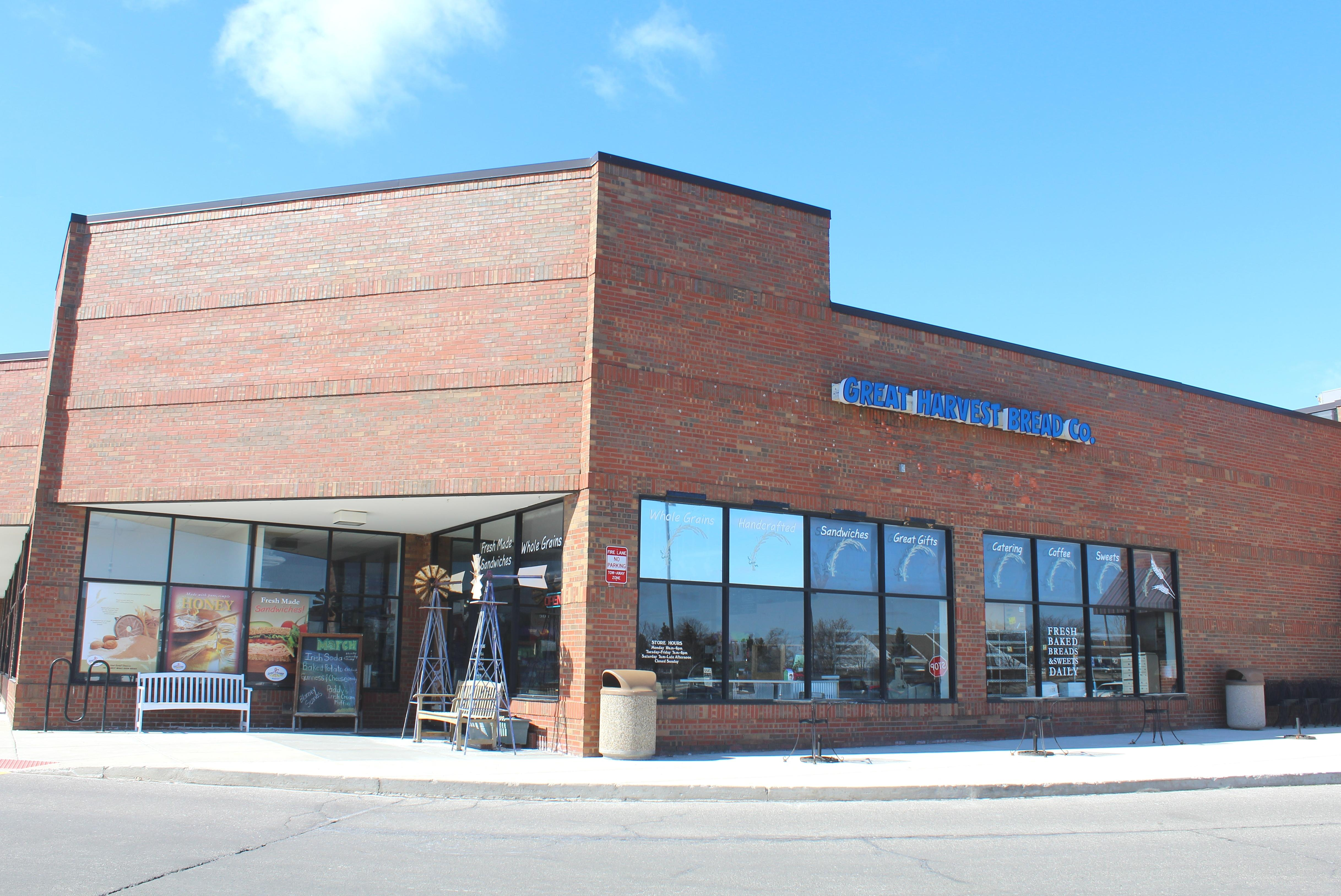
- Great Harvest Bread Co. in Ann Arbor, Michigan
- Industry: Bakeries Franchising
- Founded: 1976
- Founder: Pete and Laura Wakeman
- Headquarters: Dillon, Montana, United States
- Number of locations: 156 stores (2023)
- Area served: United States
- Products: Baked goods, soup, and sandwiches
- Website: http://www.greatharvest.com

The Great Harvest Bread Company is a franchise in the United States that sells fresh-baked bread and other items.

== History ==
In the late 1970s, Pete and Laura Wakeman, college students and founders of Great Harvest, set up a roadside stand and began baking fresh-ground whole wheat bread in Durham, Connecticut. After graduation, they opened the first Great Harvest Company in Great Falls, Montana in 1976.

After the second bakery opened near Kalispell, Montana in 1978, a third was opened by Jacque Sanchez in Spokane, Washington, which is still in operation. Following this, a franchise office was established in 1983; Great Harvest became the nation's first whole grain bread franchise.

Tom McMakin was COO from 1997 to 2001. Great Harvest is led today by President and CEO Mike Ferretti. In 2024, a 70% controlling interest in the company was sold to NewSpring Capital, a private equity firm.

== See also ==
- List of bakeries
