= Aliabad, Kamareh =

Aliabad علی‌آباد
- Village
- Location within Iran
- Coordinates: 33°40′19″N 49°48′53″E
- Country: Iran
- Province: Markazi
- County: Khomeyn
- Bakhsh: Kamareh
- Rural District: Khorram Dasht

Population (2006)
  - Total: 234
- Time zone: UTC+3:30 (IRST)
  - Summer (DST): UTC+4:30 (IRDT)

Aliabad (Persian: علی‌آباد, also Romanized as ‘Alīābād; also known as Ali Abad Japlogh) is a village in Khorram Dasht Rural District, Kamareh District, Khomeyn County, Markazi Province, Iran. At the 2006 census, its population was 234, in 56 families.
