= Ashna Khvor Rural District =

Rural district in Markazi province, Iran

Ashna Khvor Rural District Persian: دهستان آشناخور
- Rural District
- Location within Iran
- Coordinates: 33°27′N 49°53′E
- Country: Iran
- Province: Markazi
- County: Khomeyn
- District: Central
- Established: 1987
- Capital: Deh-e Now

Population (2016)
  - Total: 3,626
- Time zone: UTC+3:30 (IRST)

Ashna Khvor Rural District (Persian: دهستان آشناخور) is in the Central District of Khomeyn County, Markazi province, Iran. Its capital is the village of Deh-e Now.

== Demographics ==
=== Population ===
At the time of the 2006 National Census, the rural district's population was 4,876 in 1,187 households. There were 4,266 inhabitants in 1,206 households at the following census of 2011. The 2016 census measured the population of the rural district as 3,626 in 1,105 households. The most populous of its 13 villages was Qarah Kahriz, with 929 people.

=== Other villages in the rural district ===
- Aksabad
- Aliabad
- Ashna Khvor
- Farajabad
- Hoseynabad
- Khvorzan
- Nasrabad
- Nurabad
- Qaleh-ye Ashna Khvor
- Rezaabad
