= Mackin =

Mackin is a surname of Irish and Scottish origin. As an Irish surname, it is an anglicized form of Ó Macáin, Ó Maicín, or Mac Maicín. As a Scottish surname, it is a variant of McMackin.

== People with this name ==
- Alan Mackin (footballer) (born 1955), Scottish footballer, entrepreneur, and football club owner
- Alan Mackin (tennis) (born 1981), Scottish tennis player
- Cassie Mackin (1939–1982), American journalist
- Edward Mackin, a pseudonym of the American religious scholar and fiction writer Ralph McInerny
- James Mackin (1822–1887), American banker
- John Mackin (1943–2022), Scottish footballer and manager
- Kevin Mackin (1938–2025), American academic administrator
- Levi Mackin (born 1986), English footballer
- Peter Mackin (1878–1917), English footballer
- Sean Mackin (musician) (born 1979), violinist and backing vocalist for Yellowcard

== See also ==
- Macken (surname)
