= Macan =

Macan is a surname with multiple origins. Notable people with the surname include:

- Ana Carolina Reston Macan (1984–2006), Brazilian fashion model
- A. V. Macan (Arthur Vernon Macan, 1882–1964), Irish-Canadian golf course designer
- Darko Macan (born 1966), Croatian author and illustrator
- George Macan (1853–1943), Irish-born lawyer and cricketer in England
- Marko Macan (born 1993), Croatian water polo player
- Reginald Walter Macan (1848–1941), Irish classical scholar
- Tom Macan (born 1946), Governor and Commander-in-Chief of the British Virgin Islands
- T. T. Macan (1910–1985), British entomologist
- Trpimir Macan (born 1935), Croatian historian and lexicographer

== See also ==
- Porsche Macan, a German compact crossover SUV in production since 2014
