= Makkan =

Makkan may refer to:

- Makkan (civilization), an ancient region in the Near East
- Makkan, Markazi, a village in Iran
- Makkan, an inhabitant of Makka

== See also ==
- Maccan, a community in Canada
- Mackan, a townland in Ireland
