= Tom McMakin =

American business executive

Thomas McMakin
- Born: 1961 (age 64–65); Boston, Massachusetts, United States
- Education: Oberlin College
- Occupations: Writer, Business consultant
- Spouse: Mary McMakin

Tom McMakin (born 1961) is an American business executive and author. He is the chief executive officer of business development consulting firm Profitable Ideas Exchange (PIE).

== Career ==
McMakin attended Oberlin College in Oberlin, Ohio, graduating in 1984.

McMakin was a two-time Peace Corps Volunteer, serving in the Boyo region of Cameroon and in Estonia.

He was hired to work at the Great Harvest Bread Company in Dillon, Montana. The company was founded by Laura and Pete Wakeman, whose philosophy was to build a sustainable company and provide a work–life balance for employees. Initially McMakin was hired as newsletter editor and over the years rose to the position of chief operating officer (COO). Great Harvest was a franchise business and by the year 2000 had 140 franchises in 40 states with $6 million in sales. One of Makin's contributions was adding internet access to the franchised bakeries in the early 1990s so that information could be transmitted rapidly.

His experience at Great Harvest led to a career as an author and business development consultant. He was a co-founder of the Orchard Holdings Group, an investment group focused on mid-sized privately held companies. He then was the chief executive officer of Profitable Ideas Exchange (PIE), a consultancy that helps professional service firms with their business development. He was on the Board of Directors of MoFi, a development corporation for Montana and Idaho.

It was his experience with the philosophy of Great Harvest and its promotion of work–life balance that led McMakin to write his first book, "Bread and Butter: What a Bunch of Bakers Taught Me About Business and Happiness". In the book he describes what working at the company taught him, and that its rural location could be used to an advantage.

== Personal life ==
McMakin is married and they have two children.

== Books ==
- Bread and Butter: What A Bunch of Bakers Taught Me About Business and Happiness (St. Martins Press, 2001) ISBN 978-0312265915
- How Clients Buy: A Practical Guide to Business Development for Consulting and Professional Services (Wiley, 2018) ISBN 978-1119434702
- Never Say Sell: How The World’s Best Consulting and Professional Firms Expand Client Relationships (Wiley, 2021) ISBN 978-1119683780

== Other writings ==
- "The politics of paternity leave". Newsweek: Business Source Complete. 25 September 1995.
