= McMackin =

McMackin is a surname of Gaelic origin. Notable people with the surname include:

- Greg McMackin (born 1945), American football player and coach
- Harry A. McMackin (1880–1946), Canadian politician
- Sam McMackin (1872–1903), American baseball player

== See also ==
- McMakin
