= Pablo Machón =

Free software and free knowledge advocate and software developer

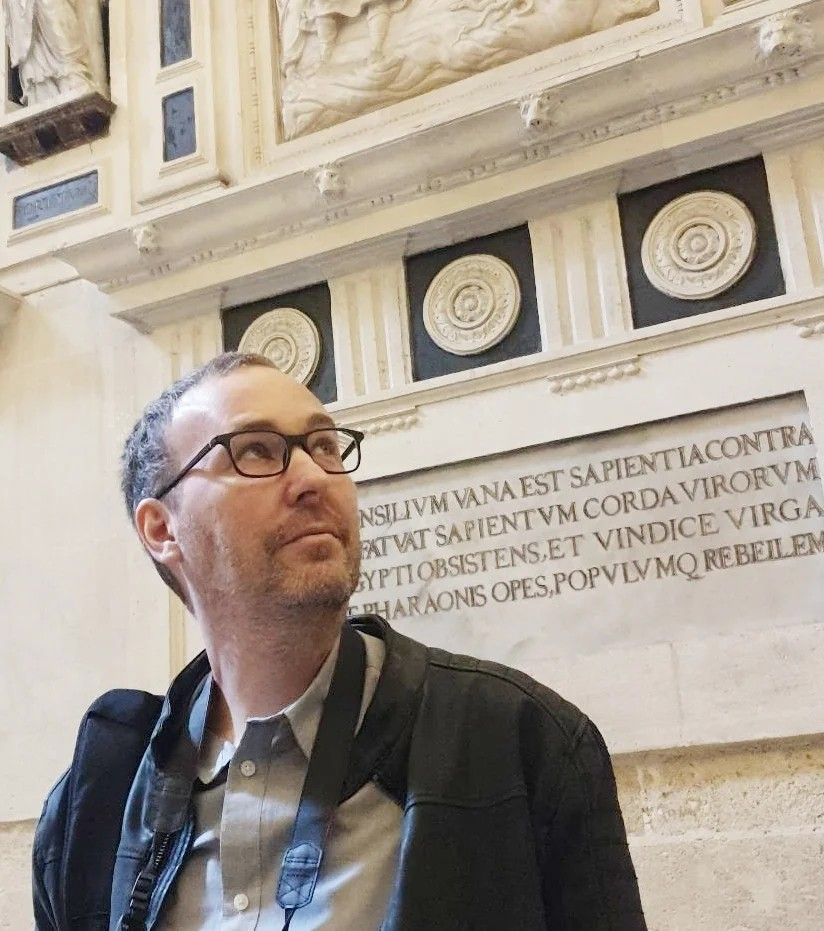
- Pablo Machón in 2022
- Born: Pablo Machón Valbuena; 1969 (age 56–57); Madrid
- Website: www.pablomachon.com

Pablo Machón (born 1969 in Madrid) is a computer scientist, free knowledge advocate, free software developer and founding member and President of the Free Knowledge Foundation, an organization that promotes people's rights and freedoms relating knowledge, software and data/information standards. He was the Spanish Team Coordinator and vice-president of the Free Software Foundation Europe, and he is a visible free software political advocate and promoter, speaking for freedom in the digital age in various international events, organizations, and the press.

He specializes in fostering free knowledge and free software in politics, and in the business and public administration sectors.

He speaks fluent Spanish and English.
