= Zerehdar =

Zerehdar زره در
- village
- Location within Iran
- Coordinates: 35°37′09″N 51°53′02″E
- Country: Iran
- Province: Tehran
- County: Damavand
- Bakhsh: Central
- Rural District: Tarrud
- Elevation: 1,450 m (4,760 ft)

Population (2016)
  - Total: 119
- Time zone: UTC+3:30 (IRST)

Zerehdar (Persian: زره در; also known as Zadeh Dar, Zardar, and Zereh) is a village in Tarrud Rural District, in the Central District of Damavand County, Tehran Province, Iran. At the 2006 census, its population was 119, in 35 families. Down from 134 in 2006.
