= Sayan (name) =

Sayan may refer to the following people

Given name

- Sayan Ghosh (born 1992), Indian cricketer
- Sayan Mondal (born 1989), Indian cricketer
- Sayan Roy (born 1991), Indian football player
- Sayan Paratanavong (born 1951), Thai sprinter.
- Sayan Sanya (1953–2013), Thai singer

Surname

- Diego García Sayán (born 1950), Peruvian judge
- Lévon Sayan (born 1934), French-Armenian impresario, producer and operatic tenor
- Seda Sayan (born 1961), Turkish pop folk singer, actress and TV variety-show hostess
