= Aliabad, Azna =

Aliabad علی‌آباد
- Village
- Location within Iran
- Coordinates: 33°24′13″N 49°29′37″E
- Country: Iran
- Province: Lorestan
- County: Azna
- Bakhsh: Central
- Rural District: Pachehlak-e Gharbi

Population (2006)
  - Total: 182
- Time zone: UTC+3:30 (IRST)
  - Summer (DST): UTC+4:30 (IRDT)

Aliabad (Persian: علی‌آباد, also Romanized as ‘Alīābād; also known as Ali Abad Japlogh) is a village in Pachehlak-e Gharbi Rural District, in the Central District of Azna County, Lorestan Province, Iran. At the 2006 census, its population was 182, in 36 families.
