= Cyan (disambiguation) =

Cyan is a range of colors in the blue/green part of the spectrum.

Cyan may also refer to:

== Arts, entertainment, and media ==
=== Fictional characters ===
- Cyan (cat), a cat in the Japanese manga series Free Collars Kingdom
- Cyan (comic strip character), a character in the Norwegian comic strip Nemi
- Tor Cyan, a character in the science fiction-oriented comic 2000 AD
- Cyan Fitzgerald, a female child character from Spawn comic books
- Cyan Garamonde, a male character in the role-playing game Final Fantasy VI
- Cyan, a character in the Roblox video game Rainbow Friends
- Cyan, a character from Horse Race Tests

=== Music ===
- Cyan (Closterkeller album), or the title track
- Cyan (EP), a 2020 EP by South Korean singer/songwriter Kang Daniel
- Cyan (Three Dog Night album), 1973
- "Cyan", a song by Ellie Goulding from her 2020 album Brightest Blue

== Brands and enterprises ==
- Cyan, Inc., a telecommunications company that was acquired by Ciena
- Cyan Worlds, also known as Cyan, Inc., a computer game company
