= Free standard =

Publicly available standard

A free standard or libre standard is a standard whose specification is publicly available and whose ongoing maintenance and development is open to involvement from anyone via a neutral organizing body. The concept of Free/Libre standards emerged in the software industry as a reaction against closed de facto "standards" which served to reinforce monopolies.

Users of a free standard have the same four freedoms associated with free software, and the freedom to participate in its development process. The standardisation process typically requires a complete free software reference implementation, which demonstrates that it is implementable and renders it usable. A libre standard is not patent-encumbered.

The Free Standards Group, for example, developed standards and released them under the GNU Free Documentation License with no cover texts or invariant sections. Reference implementations and test suites, etc. were released as Free software.

Similar processes are now followed by the various "open" standards bodies, the word "open" having been popularised by the "open source" movement in order to engage powerful industry players

== Examples of free/open standards bodies ==
- Ecma International
- OASIS
- Open Geospatial Consortium
- World Wide Web Consortium

== See also ==
- Open standard
- Free file format
- Libre knowledge
