= Mekan =

Mekan may refer to:

- Mekan.vn (also called Me ken dot vi en), an information page about businesses in the mechanical manufacturing sector in Vietnam.
- Mekan people (also called Me'en), an ethnic minority group in Ethiopia
- Me'en language (also called Mekan), a Nilo-Saharan language spoken in Ethiopia
- Mekan clan, a Jatt clan in Pakistan
- Mekan Nasyrow (born 1982), a Turkmenistan footballer
- Mekan şäherçesi, a town in Baýramaly District, Mary Region, Turkmenistan
