= Machin =

Machin may refer to:

== People ==
- Alfred Machin (director) (1877–1929), French film director
- Alfred Machin (writer) (1888–1955), British writer on social evolution
- Antonio Machín (1903–1977), Cuban singer and musician
- Arnold Machin (1911–1999), British artist
- Ernie Machin (1944–2012), British football player
- Henry Machin (1832–1918), Quebec bureaucrat
- John Machin (1680–1751), British mathematician
- Megan Machin (1906–1994), Australian playwright and author
- Mel Machin (born 1945), British football player and manager
- Pablo Machín (born 1975), Spanish football player and manager
- Peter Machin (footballer) (1883–1917), English football player
- Peter Machin (darts player) (born 1973), Australian darts player
- Stuart Machin (born 1970), British CEO of Marks & Spencer
- Tim N. Machin (1822–1915), Lieutenant Governor of California, 1863–67
- Timothy Machin (born 1948), British cricketer
- Vimael Machín (born 1993), Puerto Rican baseball player
- W. H. Machin (fl. 1900–1905), British football player

== Characters ==
- Henry "Denry" Machin, the main character in the 1911 novel The Card by Arnold Bennett
- Lonnie Machin, the secret identity of the DC Comics character Anarky

== Places ==
- Machin, Ontario, a township in Ontario, Canada

== See also ==
- Machen (disambiguation)
- Machin-like formula, a class of mathematical identities
- Machin series, a series of British stamps
- Cerro Machín, a volcano in Colombia
- Machon (disambiguation)
