= Makkan, Markazi =

Makkan مكان
- Village
- Location within Iran
- Coordinates: 33°39′11″N 49°39′08″E
- Country: Iran
- Province: Markazi
- County: Khomeyn
- Bakhsh: Kamareh
- Rural District: Chahar Cheshmeh

Population (2006)
  - Total: 148
- Time zone: UTC+3:30 (IRST)
  - Summer (DST): UTC+4:30 (IRDT)

Makkan (Persian: مكان, also Romanized as Makkān and Makān) is a village in Chahar Cheshmeh Rural District, Kamareh District, Khomeyn County, Markazi Province, Iran. At the 2006 census, its population was 148, in 37 families.
