= George Macan =

George Macan (c. 9 September 1853 – 2 November 1943) was an Irish-born lawyer and reporter, and a cricketer who played first-class cricket for Cambridge University between 1872 and 1875. He was born at Castlebellingham, County Louth, Ireland and died at Wimbledon, London.

== Biography ==
Macan was educated at Harrow School and Trinity Hall, Cambridge. As a cricketer, Macan was a right-handed middle- or lower-order batsman and a right-arm slow bowler, though he did not bowl in first-class cricket. He played in a single match for Cambridge University in 1872, and then reappeared fairly regularly in 1873, scoring 57 against an "England XI" which was a rather pale shadow of the Rest of England cricket teams that played as "England" in the period before international cricket began; the 57 was his highest first-class score, but he was unsuccessful in other matches and was not picked for the 1873 University Match against Oxford University. In one match, he played for "the Gentlemen of England" against the university side. Though he failed to pass 50 again, he was more consistently successful in both 1874 and 1875 and played in the University Match in both seasons. In 1874, he made 6 and 12 as a poor Cambridge batting side was overwhelmed by an innings and 92 runs; in 1875, he made 2 and 1 not out as Cambridge lost by just six runs. He played no further first-class cricket after leaving Cambridge, but is recorded in non-first-class scorecards from Marylebone Cricket Club and other amateur sides up to 1890.

Macan graduated from Cambridge University with a Bachelor of Arts degree in 1875 and then qualified as a lawyer, being called to the bar in 1877. He did not practise as a barrister, but instead acted as a court reporter, working for the Law Times Reports in the Chancery Division.
