= Makan (name) =

Makan is a name.

== Given name ==
Notable people with the given name Makan include:

- Makan Aïko (born 2001), French footballer
- Makan Chothe (born 2000), Indian footballer
- Makan Delrahim (born 1969), American assistant attorney general
- Makan Dembélé (born 1986), Malian footballer
- Makan Dioumassi (born 1972), French basketball player
- Makan Hislop (born 1985), Trinidad and Tobago footballer
- Makan ibn Kaki (died 940), Daylamite military leader
- Makan Konaté (born 1991), Malian football
- Makan Samabaly (born 1995), Malian footballer
- Makan Traoré (born 1992), French footballer

== Surname ==
Notable people with the surname Makan include:

- Ajay Makan, commonly known as Ajay Maken, Indian politician
- Hans-Peter Makan (born 1960), retired German footballer
- Kyranbek Makan (born 1992), Chinese basketball player of Kyrgyz descent
- Lalit Makan, commonly known as Lalit Maken, Indian politician
