= Sian, Russia =

Sian Сиан
- Selo
- Location within Amur Oblast Location within Russia
- Coordinates: 53°17′N 126°57′E
- Country: Russia
- Region: Amur Oblast
- District: Zeysky District
- Time zone: UTC+9:00

Sian (Russian: Сиан) is a rural locality (a selo) in Siansky Selsoviet of Zeysky District, Amur Oblast, Russia. The population was 63 as of 2018. There are 4 streets.

== Geography ==
Sian is located 85 km southwest of Zeya (the district's administrative centre) by road. Chalbachi is the nearest rural locality.
