= Galehzan Rural District =

Rural district in Markazi province, Iran

Galehzan Rural District Persian: دهستان گله زن
- Rural District
- Location within Iran
- Coordinates: 33°38′N 50°17′E
- Country: Iran
- Province: Markazi
- County: Khomeyn
- District: Central
- Established: 1987
- Capital: Robat-e Morad

Population (2016)
  - Total: 3,483
- Time zone: UTC+3:30 (IRST)

Galehzan Rural District (Persian: دهستان گله زن) is in the Central District of Khomeyn County, Markazi province, Iran. Its capital is the village of Robat-e Morad.

== Demographics ==
=== Population ===
At the time of the 2006 National Census, the rural district's population was 5,116 in 1,628 households. There were 4,224 inhabitants in 1,475 households at the following census of 2011. The 2016 census measured the population of the rural district as 3,483 in 1,361 households. The most populous of its 39 villages was Robat-e Morad, with 1,415 people.

=== Other villages in the rural district ===
- Asadabad
- Jalmajerd-e Jadid
- Kaf San
- Mazayen
- Qeydu
- Rashidabad
- Robat-e Arjomand
