= Shahabiyeh =

Shahabiyeh شهابيه
- Village
- Location within Iran
- Coordinates: 35°14′28″N 47°38′03″E
- Country: Iran
- Province: Kurdistan
- County: Qorveh
- Bakhsh: Serishabad
- Rural District: Yalghuz Aghaj

Population (2006)
  - Total: 186
- Time zone: UTC+3:30 (IRST)
  - Summer (DST): UTC+4:30 (IRDT)

Shahabiyeh (Persian: شهابيه, also Romanized as Shahābīyeh) is a village in Yalghuz Aghaj Rural District, Serishabad District, Qorveh County, Kurdistan Province, Iran. At the 2006 census, its population was 186, in 52 families. The village is populated by Kurds.
