= Makan Map =

Online interactive atlas of Xinjiang, China

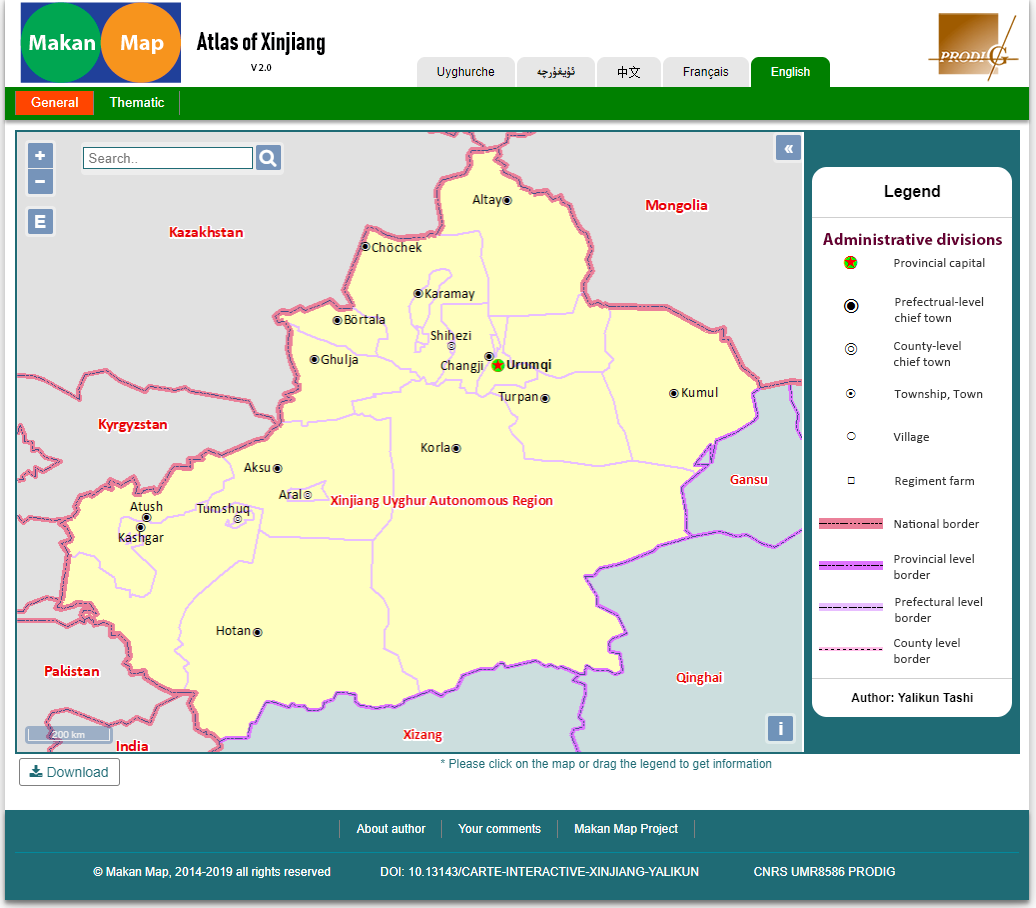
- Atlas of Xinjiang
- Website type: web mapping
- Owner: CNRS
- Creator: Yalikun Tashi (Yalqun Tash)
- Website: makanmap-prodig.cnrs.fr
- Launched: May 10, 2014
- Current status: active

The Makan Map is an online interactive atlas of the Xinjiang Uyghur Autonomous Region of China. This region covers an area of 1,664,897 km^{2}, or 16% of China's territory. It allows to visualize geographic, administrative and socio-economic baseline data, to carry out statistical analysis and to create thematic maps for this region. The Makan Map is the first multi-language atlas of Xinjiang. It has been created in four languages: Uyghur, Chinese, French and English. The current version is the second version of the Makan Map. Development is ongoing for future releases.

== Development ==
- The first version of the Makan Map was published in May 2014.
- The second version has been operational since May 2019.

== Description ==
The data are published in four forms : table, graph, general map and thematic map.

=== Tables ===
Tables show statistical data dynamically in a tooltip. The number of socio-economic indicators varies according to administrative divisions : 123 for the provincial level, 47 for a prefecture and 40 for a district. The indicators cover various fields: geography, population, administrative divisions, finance, trade, energy, natural resources, agricultural and industrial production, education, tourism, etc.

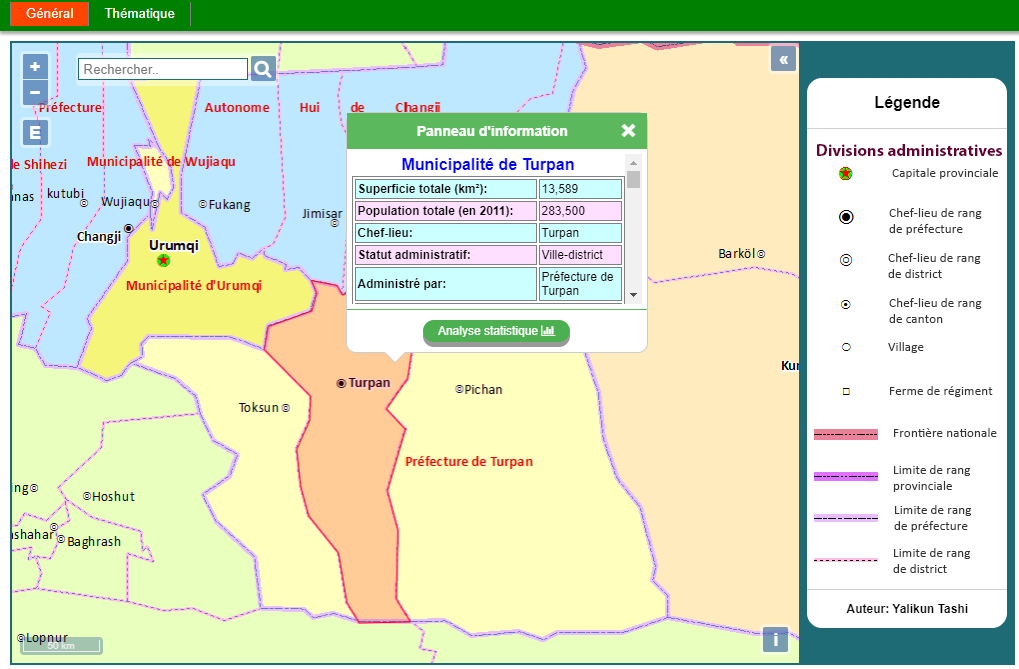
Tables show statistical data dynamically

=== Graphs ===
This atlas offers six types of graphical representation of statistical data : line charts, scatter plots, bar charts, pie charts, box plots and dot plots. Statistical variables change dynamically based on administrative divisions. Graphic parameters are also customizable.

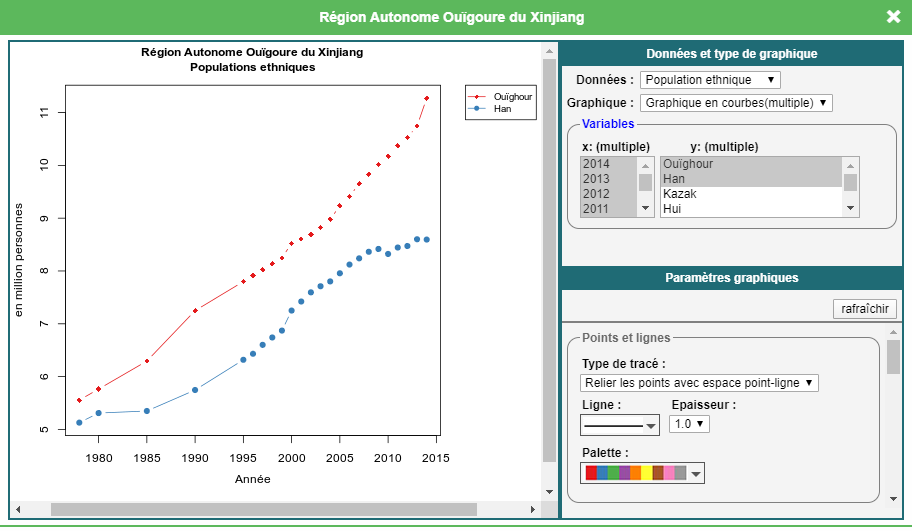
Line chartes

=== General maps ===
The maps are interactive and published on five scales. The first four scales correspond to administrative levels of province, prefecture, district and village, and the last one shows the topographic map of the region. Geographic entities represented in the maps include administrative divisions, cities, villages, transport, water systems, agriculture, forestry, livestock, industry, geomorphology, tourism and others.

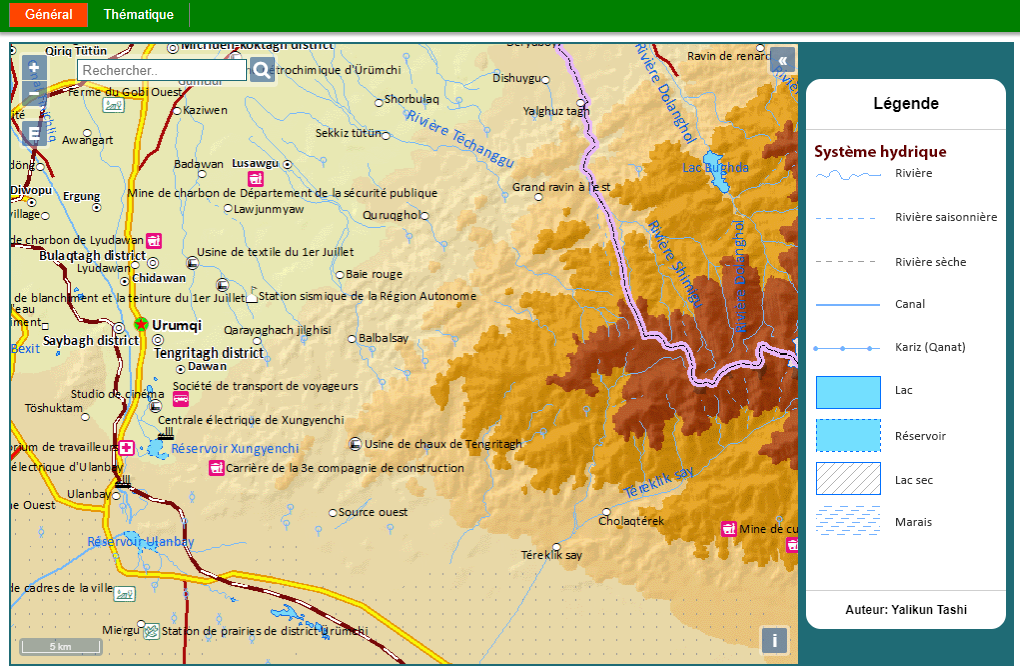
Topographic map of the Xinjiang region

=== Thematic maps ===
Four types of map are possible: choropleth, pie plot, dot-density map and bar plots. The cartographic choices are imposed to the user and can't derogate from graphic semiology. 43 themes are available for the years from 1949 to 2014. Users produce thematic maps interactively based on selected themes and map settings.

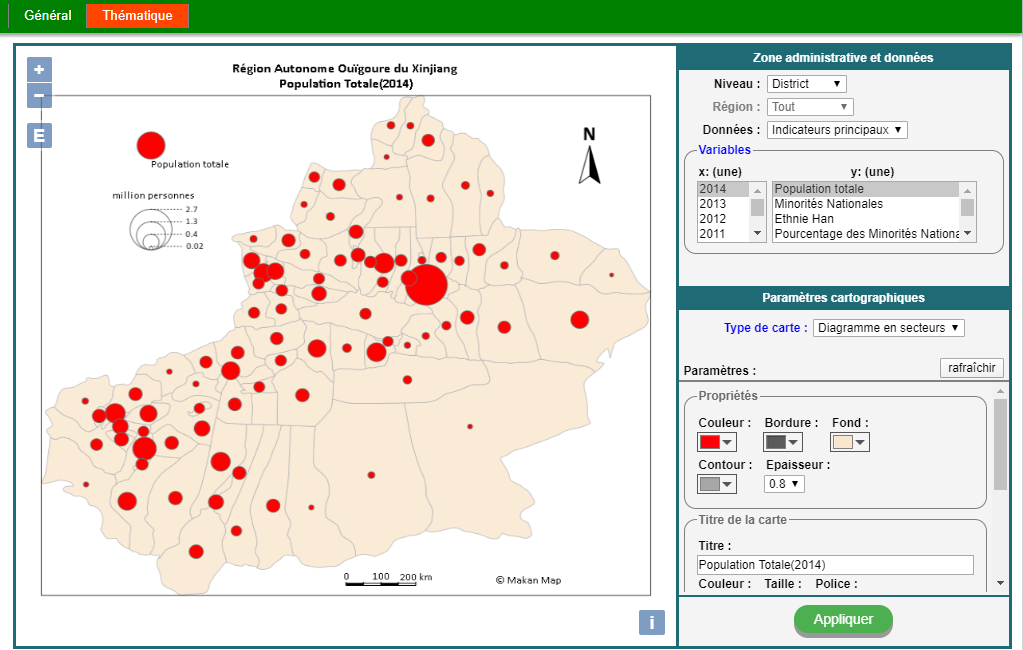
Thematic map
