= Rostaq Rural District (Khomeyn County) =

Rural district in Markazi province, Iran

Rostaq Rural District Persian: دهستان رستاق
- Rural District
- Location within Iran
- Coordinates: 33°33′N 50°01′E
- Country: Iran
- Province: Markazi
- County: Khomeyn
- District: Central
- Established: 1987
- Capital: Farnaq

Population (2016)
  - Total: 4,436
- Time zone: UTC+3:30 (IRST)

Rostaq Rural District (Persian: دهستان رستاق) is in the Central District of Khomeyn County, Markazi province, Iran. Its capital is the village of Farnaq.

== Demographics ==
=== Population ===
At the time of the 2006 National Census, the rural district's population was 6,033 in 1,620 households. There were 5,297 inhabitants in 1,639 households at the following census of 2011. The 2016 census measured the population of the rural district as 4,436 in 1,539 households. The most populous of its 29 villages was Farnaq, with 1,245 people.

=== Other villages in the rural district ===
- Amiriyeh
- Darband-e Loran
- Gusheh-ye Mohammad Malek
- Heshmatiyeh
- Poshtkuh
- Reyhan-e Olya
- Reyhan-e Sofla
