= Salehan Rural District =

Rural district in Markazi province, Iran

Salehan Rural District Persian: دهستان صالحان
- Rural District
- Location within Iran
- Coordinates: 33°46′N 50°12′E
- Country: Iran
- Province: Markazi
- County: Khomeyn
- District: Central
- Established: 1987
- Capital: Goldasht

Population (2016)
  - Total: 6,406
- Time zone: UTC+3:30 (IRST)

Salehan Rural District (Persian: دهستان صالحان) is in the Central District of Khomeyn County, Markazi province, Iran. Its capital is the village of Goldasht.

== Demographics ==
=== Population ===
At the time of the 2006 National Census, the rural district's population was 9,302 in 2,767 households. There were 7,003 inhabitants in 2,379 households at the following census of 2011. The 2016 census measured the population of the rural district as 6,406 in 2,361 households. The most populous of its 28 villages was Goldasht, with 1,938 people.

=== Other villages in the rural district ===
- Aznowjan
- Khoravand
- Khugan
- Mishijan-e Olya
- Razan
- Tonjaran
- Varabad
