= Hamzehlu Rural District =

Rural district in Markazi province, Iran

Hamzehlu Rural District Persian: دهستان حمزه لو
- Rural District
- Location within Iran
- Coordinates: 33°48′N 50°03′E
- Country: Iran
- Province: Markazi
- County: Khomeyn
- District: Central
- Established: 1987
- Capital: Sar Kubeh

Population (2016)
  - Total: 3,276
- Time zone: UTC+3:30 (IRST)

Hamzehlu Rural District (Persian: دهستان حمزه لو) is in the Central District of Khomeyn County, Markazi province, Iran. Its capital is the village of Sar Kubeh.

== Demographics ==
=== Population ===
At the time of the 2006 National Census, the rural district's population was 4,748 in 1,400 households. There were 3,844 inhabitants in 1,296 households at the following census of 2011. The 2016 census measured the population of the rural district as 3,276 in 1,213 households. The most populous of its 25 villages was Farfahan, with 698 people.

=== Other villages in the rural district ===
- Belaverjan
- Chenar
- Emamzadeh Varcheh
- Jahan Qaleh
- Sedeh Hamzehlu
- Sian-e Olya
- Sian-e Sofla
