= Central District (Khomeyn County) =

District in Markazi province, Iran

Central District (Khomeyn County) Persian: بخش مرکزی شهرستان خمین
- District
- Location within Iran
- Coordinates: 33°40′N 50°07′E
- Country: Iran
- Province: Markazi
- County: Khomeyn
- Capital: Khomeyn

Population (2016)
  - Total: 94,109
- Time zone: UTC+3:30 (IRST)

The Central District of Khomeyn County (Persian: بخش مرکزی شهرستان خمین) is in Markazi province, Iran. Its capital is the city of Khomeyn.

== Demographics ==
=== Population ===
At the time of the 2006 National Census, the district's population was 94,106 in 26,001 households. The following census in 2011 counted 94,687 people in 29,472 households. The 2016 census measured the population of the district as 94,109 inhabitants in 30,913 households.

=== Administrative divisions ===
Central District (Khomeyn County) Population
Administrative Divisions	2006	2011	2016
Ashna Khvor RD	4,876	4,266	3,626
Galehzan RD	5,116	4,224	3,483
Hamzehlu RD	4,748	3,844	3,276
Rostaq RD	6,033	5,297	4,436
Salehan RD	9,302	7,003	6,406
Khomeyn (city)	64,031	70,053	72,882
Total	94,106	94,687	94,109
RD = Rural District
