= Khomeyn County =

County in Markazi Province, Iran

Khomeyn County Persian: شهرستان خمین
- County
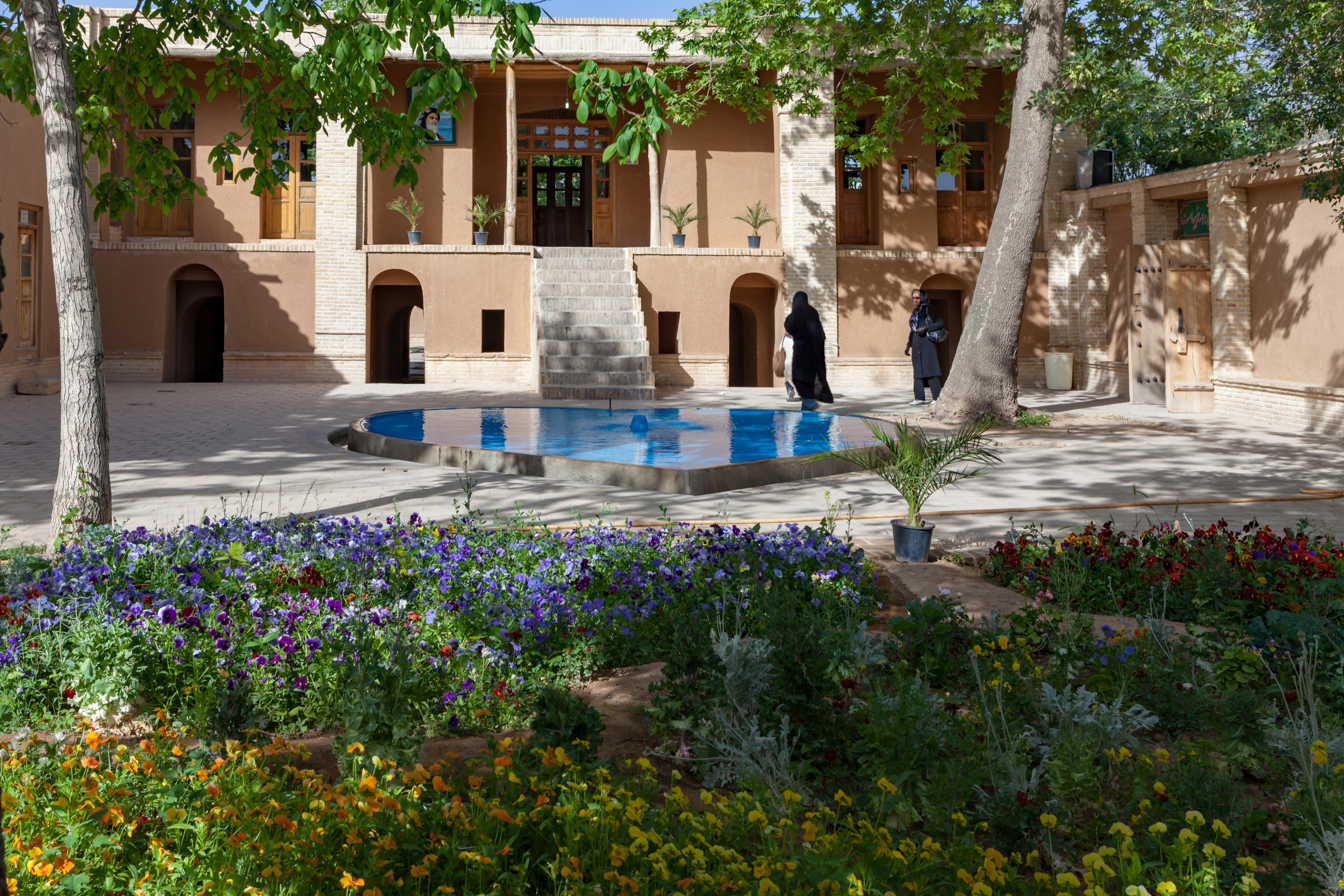
- The birthplace of Ruhollah Khomeini in Khomeyn

- Location of Khomeyn County in Markazi province (bottom, yellow)

- Location of Markazi province in Iran
- Coordinates: 33°38′N 50°01′E
- Country: Iran
- Province: Markazi
- Capital: Khomeyn
- Districts: Central, Kamareh

Population (2016)
  - Total: 105,017
- Time zone: UTC+3:30 (IRST)

Khomeyn County (Persian: شهرستان خمین) is in Markazi province, Iran. Its capital is the city of Khomeyn.

== History ==
The name "Khomeyn" was first mentioned in a book named The History of Prophets and Kings. Subterranean canals (qanats), sewers and its famous fire-temple are among the pre-Islamic relics. This region was called the center of Kamareh 200 years ago.

== Demographics ==
=== Population ===
At the time of the 2006 National Census, the county's population was 108,840 in 29,888 households. The following census in 2011 counted 107,368 people in 33,327 households. The 2016 census measured the population of the county as 105,017 in 34,611 households.

=== Administrative divisions ===
Khomeyn County's population history and administrative structure over three consecutive censuses are shown in the following table.

Khomeyn County Population
| Administrative Divisions | 2006 | 2011 | 2016 |
|---|---|---|---|
| Central District | 94,106 | 94,687 | 94,109 |
| Ashna Khvor RD | 4,876 | 4,266 | 3,626 |
| Galehzan RD | 5,116 | 4,224 | 3,483 |
| Hamzehlu RD | 4,748 | 3,844 | 3,276 |
| Rostaq RD | 6,033 | 5,297 | 4,436 |
| Salehan RD | 9,302 | 7,003 | 6,406 |
| Khomeyn (city) | 64,031 | 70,053 | 72,882 |
| Kamareh District | 14,734 | 12,681 | 10,908 |
| Chahar Cheshmeh RD | 6,852 | 5,727 | 4,646 |
| Khorram Dasht RD | 6,360 | 5,457 | 4,888 |
| Qurchi Bashi (city) | 1,522 | 1,497 | 1,374 |
| Total | 108,840 | 107,368 | 105,017 |
RD = Rural District

== Archaeology ==
According to The Journal of Orthoptera Research, in 2017-2018, a rock carving of a six-legged mantis named Empusa hedenborgii with raptorial forearms was revealed in the Teimareh rock-art site. An engraved, insect-like image has a 14cm length and 11cm width, with two circles at its sides that probably dates 40,000–4,000 years ago. This motif is analogous to the famous "squatter man" petroglyph encountered at several locations around the world.

== Geography ==
The county of Khomeyn is located in the south of Markazi province, in a fertile plain. The climate is moderate mountainous inclining to a semi-desert. Winters are cold and summers are moderate. This county lies at a distance of 323 km. from Tehran.

== Notable people ==
The county is currently famous as the birthplace of Ruhollah Khomeini, leader of the Islamic Revolution. His father's house has become an important historical monument.

== See also ==
Media related to Khomein County at Wikimedia Commons
