= List of cities, towns and villages in Tehran province =

A list of cities, towns and villages in Tehran Province of north-central Iran:

== Alphabetical ==
Cities are in bold text; all others are villages.

=== A ===
Ab Barik | Ab Barik-e Kuchek | Ab Nik | Abali | Abbasabad | Abbasabad | Abbasabad | Abbasabad | Abbasabad-e Alaqeh Band | Abbasabad-e Gol Shaygan | Abbasabad-e Rostamabad | Abbasabad-e Zargham | Abdolabad | Abdolabad-e Gardaneh | Abdollahabad-e Ojaq | Absard | Absard Rangeland Research Centre | Adaran | Afarin | Afjeh | Aftab | Ahar | Ahiyeh | Ahmadabad Culture and Technology Complex | Ahmadabad | Ahmadabad-e Mostowfi | Ahmadabad-e Vasat | Ahnam Centre of Culture and Industry | Ahnaz | Ahran | Aigel | Ajan | Ajorbast | Akbarabad-e Kazemi | Akhtarabad | Akramabad-e Kianpur | Alain | Alard | Alayin | Ali Bayat | Aliabad | Aliabad | Aliabad-e Abu ol Qasem Khani | Aliabad-e Farasudeh | Aliabad-e Khaleseh | Aliabad-e Kharabeh | Aliabad-e Mohit | Aliabad-e Mowqufeh | Aliabad-e Qeysariyyeh | Aliabad-e Tapancheh | Aliabad-e Vali | Alian | Allahabad | Aluyak | Alvard | Aminabad | Aminabad | Aminabad | Aminabad | Amirabad | Amirabad-e Kolahchi | Amiriyeh | Amiriyeh | Ammameh-e Bala | Ammameh-e Pain | Anbaj | Andariyeh | Andarman | Andisheh | Anjemabad | Anzeha | Aq Qui | Arab Ali | Arad | Arambuiyeh | Arastu | Ardineh | Argheshabad | Arjomand | Aru | Aru | Aruzhqoli | Asadabad | Asgarabad | Asgarabad-e Abbasi | Asgharabad | Ashtargarden | Asilabad | Astalak-e Danshur | Astalak-e Pain | Asur | Atabak-e Kati | Atabkashmas Owliad | Atashan | Ayeneh Varzan | Azimabad | Azizabad |

=== B ===
Baba Salman | Bad Rud | Badamak | Bagh Gol | Baghak | Bagh-e Khvas | Bagh-e Komesh | Bagh-e Sarhang Taheri | Baghestan | Bahan | Bahari Husbandry | Bahman 22 Dormitory | Bahmanabad | Bahramabad | Band Alikhan | Baqershahr | Barg-e Jahan | Batri Sazi Nur | Beheshti | Bid Kaneh | Bidak | Bokeh | Bu ol Araz | Bu ol Qeytas | Bujan | Bulan | Bumahen |

=== C ===
Chahar Bagh | Chahar Bagh | Chahardangeh | Chaleh Murt | Chaleh Tarkhan | Chaltasian | Changi | Chaqu-ye Akhvani | Chaqu-ye Bala | Charmshahr | Chehel Qez va Siah Darreh | Chenaran | Chenar-e Arabha | Cheshmehha | Chichaklu

=== D ===
Dagh Qui | Damavand | Dami Aqa | Damzabad | Dar Deh | Darakhtbid | Darband Sar | Dar-e Bala | Darrud | Darsunabad | Daryabak | Davazdeh Emam | Davudabad | Deh Abbas | Deh Gardan | Deh Hasan | Deh Kheyr | Deh Shad-e Bala | Deh Shad-e Pain | Dehak | Deh-e Masin | Deh-e Now | Dehin | Dehnar | Dinarabad | Dinarabad | Do Ab | Dohtuheh-ye Olya | Dowlatabad | Dowlatabad | Dowlatabad-e Qeysariyeh | Dozdabad | Dutuheh-ye Sofla | Delengo Baagh

=== E ===
Ebrahimabad | Ebrahimabad | Ebrahimabad | Ebrahimabad | Ebrahimabad | Emad Avar | Emamzadeh Abdollah | Emamzadeh Aqil | Emamzadeh Baqer | Emamzadeh Davud | Esfandabad | Eshqabad | Eshtaharzan | Eskaman | Eslamabad | Eslamabad | Eslamabad | Eslamshahr | Esmailabad | Esmailabad-e Moin | Ezatabad-e Ghafariyeh

=== F ===
Fakhrabad | Farahabad | Fararat | Fasham | Fathabad | Fathabad | Ferdowsieh | Ferunabad | Filestan | Firuzabad | Firuzbahram | Firuzkuh Industrial Centre | Firuzkuh

=== G ===
Gacheh | Gandak | Garm Absard | Garmabdar | Gavadeh | Gazarkhani-ye Seyyedabad | Geduk | Gelahak | Ghaniabad | Giliard | Gol Abbas | Gol Darreh | Gol Dasteh | Gol Khandan-e Jadid | Gol Khandan-e Qadim | Gol Tappeh-ye Kabir | Golestan | Golzar | Gomorgan | Gur Sefid | Guy Bolagh

=== H ===
Habibabad | Haddadiyeh | Haft Jubeh | Haft Juy | Hajarabad | Hajjiabad | Hajjiabad-e Amlak | Hajjiabad-e Arabha | Hajjiabad-e Salar | Hajjiabad-e Sofla | Hakimabad | Hamamak | Hamand Khaleseh Vadan | Hamand Kilan | Hamand Kuhan va Kurdar | Hamand Lamsar | Hamandabsard Livestock Centre | Hamedanak | Hameh Sin | Hamidabad | Hamzehabad | Hanzak | Harandeh | Hariaj | Hasanabad | Hasanabad-e Baqeraf | Hasanabad-e Khaleseh | Hasanabad-e Kuh Gach | Hasanabad-e Mir Hashemi | Hashemak | Havir | Hesar Bon | Hesar Goli | Hesar Mehtar | Hesar Mehtar | Hesar-e Amir | Hesar-e Bala | Hesar-e Bala | Hesar-e Chupan | Hesar-e Hasan Beyk | Hesar-e Kuchek | Hesar-e Olya | Hesar-e Pain | Hesar-e Qazi | Hesar-e Sati | Hesar-e Shalpush | Hesar-e Sorkh | Heydarabad | Heydari Poultry Company | Hizom Darreh | Hoseynabad | Hoseynabad | Hoseynabad-e Alizadeh | Hoseynabad-e Hafashlu | Hoseynabad-e Javaheri | Hoseynabad-e Kashani | Hoseynabad-e Qajar | Hoseynabad-e Qashqai | Hoseynabad-e Siahab | Hoseynabad-e Yangejeh |

=== I ===
Ijdan | Ijdanak | Institutional Group Home 33 | Ira | Irin

=== J ===
Jaban | Jafarabad | Jafarabad-e Akhavan | Jafarabad-e Baqeraf | Jafarabad-e Jangal | Jafarabad-e Jangal | Jahanabad | Jahanabad | Jalilabad | Jalilabad | Jamalabad | Jameh Karan | Javadabad | Javard | Jeliz Jand | Jirud | Jitu | Jowzdar | July 7 International Airport

=== K ===
Kabirabad | Kabud Gonbad | Kabudband | Kabutardarreh | Kadudeh | Kahnak | Kahrizak | Kahrizak | Kahrizak | Kahrizak-e Burbur | Kajan | Kal Dasht-e Abu Talebi | Kal Dasht-e Taraqi | Kalan | Kalar Khan-e Bala | Kalin-e Khalaseh | Kalin-e Sadat | Kamaliyeh | Kamar Khani | Kamard | Kamard Industrial Complex | Kandian | Kar Gavaneh | Karak-e Inkacheh | Karasht | Kardzar | Karimabad | Karimabad | Karimabad-e Muqufeh | Karimabad-e Tehranchi | Karkhaneh-ye Maseh | Kashanak | Katalan | Kavirabad | Kazemabad | Kelak | Kenar Gerd-e Pain | Keshar-e Olya | Keshar-e Sofla | Keygavar | Khalazir | Khaledabad | Khalifabad | Khanloq | Kharam Deh | Khavar Shahr | Khaveh | Kheyrabad | Kheyrabad | Khojir | Khomarabad | Khomedeh | Khosrovan | Khosrow | Khosrowabad | Khurain | Khurin | Khurin | Khvajeh Vali-ye Olya | Khvajeh Vali-ye Sofla | Khvoshnam | Kigah | Kilan | Kiur | Koleyn | Kolugan | Komand | Kond Olya | Kond Sofla | Kord Amir | Kord-e Nabard | Kordeyan | Kulaj | Kushkak | Kushk-e Fashapuyeh

=== L ===
Lalan | Lappeh Zanak | Laqeh | Lasem Cheshmeh | Lavasan | Lavasan-e Bozorg | Lazur | Lomabad | Luman |

=== M ===
Maftun | Mahabad | Mahmudabad | Mahmudabad | Mahmudabad | Mahmudabad-e Khalajabad | Mahmudabad-e Khalaseh | Mahmudabad-e Kohneh | Mahmudabad-e Now | Mahmudabad-e Tabat Bayi | Malard | Malard-e Vilay-ye Jonubi | Malekabad | Mandakan | Mandanak | Manjilabad | Mara | Marjanabad | Mashhad-e Firuzkuh | Mazdaran | Mazraeh-ye Karim Khani | Mazraeh-ye Razeqabad | Mazraeh-ye Sadat | Mehan | Mehdiabad | Mehdiabad | Mehdiabad | Mehr Azin | Mehrabad | Mehranabad | Mehrchin | Mehrdasht | Mesgarabad | Meydan-e Tirzhandarmari | Meymanatabad | Mohammadabad | Mohammadabad | Mohammadabad-e Amin | Mohammadabad-e Arab | Mohammadabad-e Ayala | Mohammadabad-e Nayiniha | Moinabad | Mojtame-e Sanati-ye Baharestan | Mojtame-e Shahid Namju | Moqanak | Moqimabad | Moradabad | Morteza Gerd | Mosha | Mowniyeh | Mumej | Musaabad-e Bakhtiari | Musaabad-e Kashani

=== N ===
Najafabad | Najafdar | Najmabad | Nam Avar | Namrud | Naserabad | Nasim Shahr | Nasirabad | Nasirabad | Navheh Division | Nazarabad | Nazarabad | Nematabad-e Ghar | Neyak | Nezamabad | Niknam Deh | Nosratabad | Now Deh | Now Deh | Nurabad

=== O ===
Ovrin | Owchunak | Owzen Darreh-ye Pain

=== P ===
Pakdasht | Palain | Palang Darreh | Parandak | Parchin | Pardis | Pas Qaleh | Peyghambar | Pirdeh | Pishva | Pist-e Abali | Posht-e Larijan | Purzand-e Pain | Purzand-e Vasat

=== Q ===
Qajarabad | Qajar-e Takht Rostam | Qaleh Baha | Qaleh Bala | Qaleh Boland | Qaleh Khvajeh | Qaleh Now | Qaleh Now | Qaleh Now | Qaleh Now-e Amlak | Qaleh Now-e Hajji Musa | Qaleh Now-e Khaleseh | Qaleh Sangi | Qaleh Sheykh | Qaleh Sin | Qaleh-ye Abdolabad | Qaleh-ye Aref | Qaleh-ye Azimabad | Qaleh-ye Faramarzi | Qaleh-ye Mohammad Ali Khan | Qaleh-ye Now Chaman Zamin | Qaleh-ye Now-e Fashapuyeh | Qaleh-ye Qasemabad | Qaleh-ye Seyyed | Qameshlu | Qamsar | Qanat Kuchek-e Aqsi | Qanat Kuchek-e Olya | Qanbarabad | Qarah Tappeh | Qarah Torpaq | Qarchak | Qasemabad | Qasemabad-e Akhavan | Qasemabad-e Eskander Beyk | Qasemabad-e Qanat Shur | Qasemabad-e Shurabad | Qasemabad-e Tehranchi | Qebchaq | Qermez Tappeh | Qeshlaq-e Amirabad | Qeshlaq-e Amroabad | Qeshlaq-e Ferunabad | Qeshlaq-e Ganji | Qeshlaq-e Hajjiabad | Qeshlaq-e Jalilabad | Qeshlaq-e Jitu | Qeshlaq-e Karimabad | Qeshlaq-e Malard | Qeshlaq-e Mashhadi Abu ol Hasan | Qeshlaq-e Mashhadi Mohammad | Qeshlaq-e Mehrchin | Qeshlaq-e Moinabad | Qeshlaq-e Qaleh Now-e Amlak | Qeshlaq-e Quinak | Qeshlaq-e Shamsabad | Qeshlaq-e Yusef Reza | Qeysarabad | Qiamdasht | Qods | Qomiabad | Quch Hesar | Quinak-e Rakhshani | Quinak-e Zohari

=== R ===
Rahatabad | Rahimabad | Rajabi Kia Poultry Company | Ramin | Randan | Rang Raz | Rasanan | Rashidabad | Rayhan Agricultural Centre | Razakan | Raziabad | Raziabad-e Bala | Raziabad-e Pain | Razmareh | Reyhanabad | Riyeh | Robat Karim | Rostamabad | Rostamabad | Roudehen | Rud Barak | Rudafshan | Rudak | Ruteh

=== S ===
Sabashahr | Sadabad-e Amlak | Sadat Mahalleh | Sadeqabad | Safadasht | Safayieh | Safiabad | Saidabad | Saidabad | Saidabad | Saleh Bon | Salehabad | Salehabad | Salehabad | Salehabad | Salehabad-e Hesar-e Shalpush | Salehabad-e Seyyedabad | Salehabad-e Sharqi | Salman | Salmanabad | Salmanabad | Salmanabad | Salmian | Sand Mining Complex | Sang Tarashan | Sangan | Sanjarian | Saqarchin | Saqqez Darreh | Sar Chaman | Sar Gol | Saranza | Sarbandan | Sarmandan | Sefidar | Sefidestan | Seyyedabad | Shad Mehan | Shah Bolaghi | Shahedshahr | Shahrabad | Shahrabad-e Ilat | Shahrak-e Danesh | Shahrak-e Emam Hasan-e Mojtaba | Shahrak-e Enqelab | Shahrak-e Jafariyeh | Shahrak-e Mustafa Khomeyni | Shahrak-e Resalat | Shahrak-e Siah Cheshmeh va Menatul | Shahrak-ye Yarnedak | Shahr-e Jadid-e Parand | Shahrestanak | Shahriar | Shamsabad | Shamsabad | Shamsabad | Shamsabad | Shamsabad | Shamsabad-e Arab | Sharifabad | Sharifabad | Sharifabad | Shatar Mohammad-e Sofla | Shatareh | Shemshak | Shemshak-e Bala | Shemshak-e Pain | Sherkat-e Mahan Rah | Sherkat-e Ran | Shesh Debanlu | Shoeybabad-e Now | Shokrabad | Shokrabad-e Kavir | Shotor Khvar | Shotor Khvar | Shuran | Shushabad | Siah Sang-e Jadid | Simindasht | Simun | Sinai and Gulf Corner Centre | Sinak | Solombor | Sorkheh Deh | Sureh

=== T ===
Tabain | Taherabad | Taherabad | Tahneh | Tajareh | Takht-e Chenar | Takhteh Ha | Talebabad | Talun | Tamasha | Tamisian | Tangeh | Tappeh-ye Ata | Taqiabad-e Shahrestan | Tarand-e Bala | Tarand-e Pain | Tares | Tarom-e Gur Sefid | Tasisat-e Sadd-e Latian | Tehran | Tellow-e Bala | Tellow-e Pain | Tirak | Toghan | Torpaq Tappeh | Torsh Anbeh | Torud | Towchal | Turquzabad | Tutak

=== V ===
Vadan | Vahidieh | Vahnabad | Valiabad | Valiabad | Valiabad | Valiabad-e Jazairi | Varabad | Varamin | Varaminak | Vardaneh | Vardij | Vareh | Varish | Varskhvaran | Vasefjan | Vaskareh | Vastar | Vazna | Veshtan | Vijin-e Bala | Vijin-e Pain

=== Y ===
Yabarak | Yadreh | Yahar | Yam | Yilqan Darreh | Yurd-e Shad | Yusefabad-e Khaleseh | Yusefabad-e Qavam | Yusefabad-e Seyrafi

=== Z ===
Zahirabad | Zamanabad | Zan | Zardband | Zardestan | Zarindasht | Zarman | Zarnan | Zarrin Deh | Zarrinabad | Zavareh Bid | Zavareh Var | Zayegan | Zerehdar | Zeyarat-e Bala | Zeyarat-e Pain | Zivan | Zolfabad |
