= Shamsabad, Tehran (disambiguation) =

Shamsabad (Persian: شمس اباد) in Tehran Province may refer to:

- Shamsabad, Tehran, Tehran County
- Shamsabad, Eslamshahr, Eslamshahr County
- Shamsabad, Fashapuyeh, Rey County
- Shamsabad, Kahrizak, Rey County
- Shamsabad, Varamin, Varamin County
- Shamsabad-e Arab, Varamin County
