= Hesar-e Sorkh, Tehran =

Hesar-e Sorkh حصارسرخ
- Village
- Location within Iran
- Coordinates: 35°13′53″N 51°45′00″E
- Country: Iran
- Province: Tehran
- County: Varamin
- Bakhsh: Javadabad
- Rural District: Behnamarab-e Jonubi

Population (2006)
  - Total: 92
- Time zone: UTC+3:30 (IRST)
  - Summer (DST): UTC+4:30 (IRDT)

Hesar-e Sorkh (Persian: حصارسرخ, also Romanized as Ḩeşār-e Sorkh) is a village in Behnamarab-e Jonubi Rural District, Javadabad District, Varamin County, Tehran Province, Iran. At the 2006 census, its population was 92, in 25 families.
