= Emamzadeh Abdollah, Tehran =

Emamzadeh Abdollah امامزاده عبدالله
- Village
- Location within Iran
- Coordinates: 35°10′20″N 51°47′43″E
- Country: Iran
- Province: Tehran
- County: Varamin
- Bakhsh: Javadabad
- Rural District: Behnamarab-e Jonubi

Population (2016)
  - Total: 11
- Time zone: UTC+3:30 (IRST)

Emamzadeh Abdollah (Persian: امامزاده عبدالله, also Romanized as Emāmzādeh ‘Abdollāh) is a village in Behnamarab-e Jonubi Rural District, Javadabad District, Varamin County, Tehran Province, Iran.

At the time of the 2006 National Census, the village's population was 15, in 6 households. The following census in 2011 recorded 11 people in 5 households. The 2016 census measured the village's population as 11 people in 6 households.
