= Ezatabad-e Ghafariyeh =

Ezatabad-e Ghafariyeh عزت ابادغفاريه
- Village
- Location within Iran
- Coordinates: 35°03′24″N 51°39′54″E
- Country: Iran
- Province: Tehran
- County: Varamin
- Bakhsh: Javadabad
- Rural District: Behnamarab-e Jonubi

Population (2006)
  - Total: 20
- Time zone: UTC+3:30 (IRST)
  - Summer (DST): UTC+4:30 (IRDT)

Ezatabad-e Ghafariyeh (Persian: عزت ابادغفاريه, also Romanized as ‘Ezatābād-e Ghafārīyeh; also known as ‘Ezatābād) is a village in Behnamarab-e Jonubi Rural District, Javadabad District, Varamin County, Tehran Province, Iran. At the 2006 census, its population was 20, in 8 families.
