= Aliabad-e Mohit =

Aliabad-e Mohit علي ابادمحيط
- Village
- Location within Iran
- Coordinates: 35°13′39″N 51°44′43″E
- Country: Iran
- Province: Tehran
- County: Varamin
- Bakhsh: Javadabad
- Rural District: Behnamarab-e Jonubi

Population (2006)
  - Total: 227
- Time zone: UTC+3:30 (IRST)
  - Summer (DST): UTC+4:30 (IRDT)

Aliabad-e Mohit (Persian: علي ابادمحيط, also Romanized as ‘Alīābād-e Moḩīţ) is a village in Behnamarab-e Jonubi Rural District, Javadabad District, Varamin County, Tehran Province, Iran. At the 2006 census, its population was 227, in 55 families.
