= Hesar Goli =

Hesar Goli حصارگلي
- Village
- Location within Iran
- Coordinates: 35°07′06″N 51°47′12″E
- Country: Iran
- Province: Tehran
- County: Varamin
- Bakhsh: Javadabad
- Rural District: Behnamarab-e Jonubi

Population (2006)
  - Total: 94
- Time zone: UTC+3:30 (IRST)
  - Summer (DST): UTC+4:30 (IRDT)

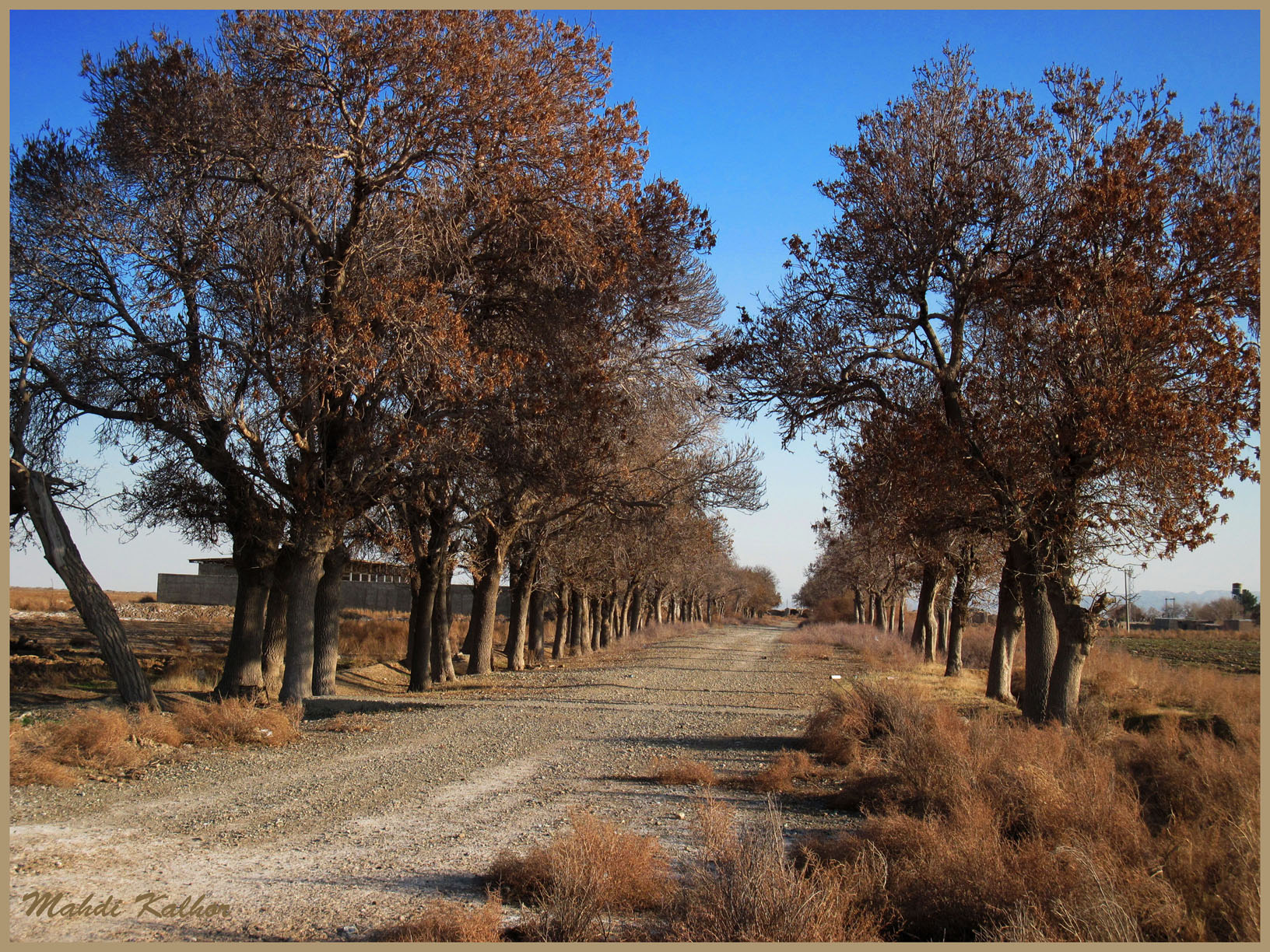
Hesar Goli Village entrance, Varamin County, Tehran.

Hesar Goli (Persian: حصارگلي, also Romanized as Ḩeşār Golī and Ḩeşār Qolī) is a village in Behnamarab-e Jonubi Rural District, Javadabad District, Varamin County, Tehran Province, Iran. At the 2006 census, its population was 94, in 26 families.
