= Hesar-e Kuchek =

Hesar-e Kuchek حصاركوچك
- Village
- Location within Iran
- Coordinates: 35°12′13″N 51°45′17″E
- Country: Iran
- Province: Tehran
- County: Varamin
- Bakhsh: Javadabad
- Rural District: Behnamarab-e Jonubi

Population (2006)
  - Total: 90
- Time zone: UTC+3:30 (IRST)
  - Summer (DST): UTC+4:30 (IRDT)

Hesar-e Kuchek (Persian: حصاركوچك, also Romanized as Ḩeşār-e Kūchek, Ḩeşār Kūchek, Ḩeşār-e Kūchak, and Hisār Kuchik; also known as Ḩeşār-e Soflá) is a village in Behnamarab-e Jonubi Rural District, Javadabad District, Varamin County, Tehran Province, Iran. At the 2006 census, its population was 90, in 24 families.
