= Hoseynabad-e Qashqai =

Hoseynabad-e Qashqai حسین‌آباد قشقایی
- Village
- Location within Iran
- Coordinates: 35°12′39″N 51°38′20″E
- Country: Iran
- Province: Tehran
- County: Varamin
- Bakhsh: Javadabad
- Rural District: Behnamarab-e Jonubi

Population (2006)
  - Total: 46
- Time zone: UTC+3:30 (IRST)
  - Summer (DST): UTC+4:30 (IRDT)

Hoseynabad-e Qashqai (Persian: حسين‌آباد قشقایی, also Romanized as Ḩoseynābād-e Qashqā’ī; also known as Ḩoseynābād) is a village in Behnamarab-e Jonubi Rural District, Javadabad District, Varamin County, Tehran Province, Iran. At the 2006 census, its population was 46, in 7 families.
