= Davazdeh Emam, Tehran =

Davazdeh Emam دوازده امام
- Village
- Location within Iran
- Coordinates: 35°05′24″N 51°44′24″E
- Country: Iran
- Province: Tehran
- County: Varamin
- Bakhsh: Javadabad
- Rural District: Behnamarab-e Jonubi

Population (2006)
  - Total: 18
- Time zone: UTC+3:30 (IRST)
  - Summer (DST): UTC+4:30 (IRDT)

Davazdeh Emam (Persian: دوازده امام, also Romanized as Davāzdeh Emām and Davāzdah Emām) is a village in Behnamarab-e Jonubi Rural District, Javadabad District, Varamin County, Tehran Province, Iran. At the 2006 census, its population was 18, in 5 families.
