= Hajjiabad-e Arabha =

Hajjiabad-e Arabha حاج ابادعربها
- Village
- Location within Iran
- Coordinates: 35°13′25″N 51°46′00″E
- Country: Iran
- Province: Tehran
- County: Varamin
- Bakhsh: Javadabad
- Rural District: Behnamarab-e Jonubi

Population (2006)
  - Total: 212
- Time zone: UTC+3:30 (IRST)
  - Summer (DST): UTC+4:30 (IRDT)

Hajjiabad-e Arabha (Persian: حاج ابادعربها, also Romanized as Hājjīābād-e ‘Arabha; also known as Hājīābād-e ‘Arab, Ḩājjīābād, and Hājīābād) is a village in Behnamarab-e Jonubi Rural District, Javadabad District, Varamin County, Tehran Province, Iran. At the 2006 census, its population was 212, in 53 families.
