= Band Alikhan =

Band Alikhan بندعليخان
- Village
- Location within Iran
- Coordinates: 35°01′11″N 51°36′33″E
- Country: Iran
- Province: Tehran
- County: Varamin
- Bakhsh: Javadabad
- Rural District: Behnamarab-e Jonubi

Population (2006)
  - Total: 19
- Time zone: UTC+3:30 (IRST)
  - Summer (DST): UTC+4:30 (IRDT)

Band Alikhan (Persian: بندعليخان, also Romanized as Band ‘Alīkhān and Band-e ‘Alī Khān) is a village in Behnamarab-e Jonubi Rural District, Javadabad District, Varamin County, Tehran Province, Iran. At the 2006 census, its population was 19, in 10 families.
