= Bu ol Araz =

Bu ol Araz بوالعرض
- Village
- Location within Iran
- Coordinates: 35°15′44″N 51°42′23″E
- Country: Iran
- Province: Tehran
- County: Varamin
- Bakhsh: Javadabad
- Rural District: Behnamarab-e Jonubi

Population (2006)
  - Total: 19
- Time zone: UTC+3:30 (IRST)
  - Summer (DST): UTC+4:30 (IRDT)

Bu ol Araz (Persian: بوالعرض, also Romanized as Bū ol ‘Araẕ and Bowl‘arz) is a village in Behnamarab-e Jonubi Rural District, Javadabad District, Varamin County, Tehran Province, Iran. At the 2006 census, its population was 19, in 5 families.
