= Shokrabad-e Kavir =

Shokrabad-e Kavir شكرابادكوير
- Village
- Location within Iran
- Coordinates: 35°04′22″N 51°42′58″E
- Country: Iran
- Province: Tehran
- County: Varamin
- Bakhsh: Javadabad
- Rural District: Behnamarab-e Jonubi

Population (2006)
  - Total: 10
- Time zone: UTC+3:30 (IRST)
  - Summer (DST): UTC+4:30 (IRDT)

Shokrabad-e Kavir (Persian: شكرابادكوير, also Romanized as Shokrābād-e Kavīr; also known as Shokrābād and Salārābād) is a village in Behnamarab-e Jonubi Rural District, Javadabad District, Varamin County, Tehran Province, Iran. At the 2006 census, its population was 10, in 6 families.
