= Qaleh-ye Qasemabad =

Qaleh-ye Qasemabad قلعه قاسم اباد
- Village
- Country: Iran
- Province: Tehran
- County: Varamin
- Bakhsh: Javadabad
- Rural District: Behnamarab-e Jonubi

Population (2006)
  - Total: 48
- Time zone: UTC+3:30 (IRST)
  - Summer (DST): UTC+4:30 (IRDT)

Qaleh-ye Qasemabad (Persian: قلعه قاسم اباد, also Romanized as Qal‘eh-ye Qāsemābād) is a village in Behnamarab-e Jonubi Rural District, Javadabad District, Varamin County, Tehran Province, Iran. At the 2006 census, its population was 48, in 17 families.
