= Tajareh, Tehran =

Tajareh تجره التَجَرَة
- village
- Location within Iran
- Coordinates: 35°13′39″N 51°42′47″E
- Country: Iran
- Province: Tehran
- County: Varamin
- Bakhsh: Javadabad
- Rural District: Behnamarab-e Jonubi

Population (2006)
  - Total: 168
- Time zone: UTC+3:30 (IRST)
  - Summer (DST): UTC+4:30 (IRDT)

Tajareh (Persian: تجره) (Arabic: التَجَرَة) is a tourism-targeted village located in Behnamarab-e Jonubi, Javadabad District, Varamin County, within Tehran Province, Iran . Its geographical coordinates are approximately 35°13' N latitude and 51°42' E longitude.

Historically, during the Qajar era, Tajareh contributed 60 cavalrymen to Tehran under the command and support of Agha Mohammad Khan. The village's agriculture is diverse and includes summer vegetables, grains, cotton, grapes, pomegranates, figs, and livestock fodder. At the 2006 census, its population was 168, in 49 families.

== Etymology ==
According to the Persian lexicon Burhan-e Qati, the word Tajareh (rhyming with sharar) refers to winter residences ( palaces ) or to "the white-clad ones."

The word "Tajareh" may be derived from the Arabic form al-Tajarah ( التَجَرَة ) . However, some researchers trace the origin of the name to Arabic. Thus, the name Tajareh may signify “the place of movement, tribal migration, or bold identity.”

== Population ==
This village is located in the Behnam Arab-e Jonubi Rural District. According to the 2006 census by the Statistical Center of Iran, its population was 168 people, in 49 families. The main ethnic groups residing in the village are Arab Alidousti, Ghanbari, and Tajik.

== Historical and Cultural Sites ==
The remaining historical and cultural landmarks of this village include:

- The mausoleum of Ali Akbar Shah Tork

- Bozorg Hill, Shoghali Hill, and Koochak Hill (Naqqarkhaneh)

- Reza Khan Alidousti's fortress or caravanserai

- Ayyub Khan Alidousti's fortress

- Ebrahim's fortress and the manor houses of Ayyub Khan and Ebrahim Alidousti

- Bagh-e Paeen (Lower Garden), Bagh-e Kohneh (Old Garden), and the Qal'eh Garden

- Alidousti Garden, which has ancient trees

- An old mosque and school (formerly Sha'ban Ali's house)

- A two-story old tower, believed to be a remnant of a watchtower from the ancient village of Tajareh, located

in Mr. Ghanbari's yard. It predates the fortresses of Reza Khan and Ayyub Khan.

=== Mausoleum of Ali Akbar Shah-e Tork ===
Ali Akbar Shah Tork was a renowned mystic and spiritual leader in the region. His shrine features a pyramid-shaped dome and a beautiful stepped entrance facing north and south. It has two covered iwans (porticoes) on the north and south sides with arched ceilings, each measuring approximately 7 by 3.05 meters, later extended with brick ceilings without any decorations.

The shrine includes an octagonal chamber with recessed, mihrab-shaped walls and royal platforms (shahneshin) on the eastern and western sides. Each of the four sides has large, similarly designed niches with simple plaster decorations and vase motifs. The tomb lies at the center without a zarih (shrine enclosure), and its thick walls, over one meter, are built from adobe, mud, brick, and mortar. Adjacent to the shrine once stood a khanqah (Sufi lodge) and a dhikr house, now completely destroyed. The structure dates back to the Safavid era and was partially renovated during the Qajar period. Surrounding the shrine is a large cemetery primarily containing graves of the Alidousti, Mohammadi, Ghanbari, Tabatabai, and Tajik families.

There is no known genealogical record of Shah Ali Akbar.

=== Ayyub Khan Alidousti's Manor ===
This traditional five-door house is divided into several parts: a hall, iwan (veranda), two kitchens, shahneshin (noble seating area), windcatcher (badgir), cellar, and storage rooms. Currently owned by the Islamic Republic of Iran Broadcasting (IRIB), it has served as a filming location for various productions. It is under

restoration for future use as a filming location and eco-tourism residence.

=== Reza Khan Alidousti's Manor ===
This five-door manor includes a shahneshin, a kitchen, a large hall, a tall terrace, and two high windcatchers for ventilation and cooling during summer.

=== Archaeological Hills ===
- Hill No. 1 dates back to the 8th-9th centuries AH and was registered on Iran's National Heritage List on

February 1, 2003 (Record No. 7433).

- Hill No. 3 dates to the 6th-7th centuries AH and was also registered on February 1, 2003 (Record No.

7434).

- Hill No. 4 belongs to the Ilkhanid era and was registered on the same date (Record No. 7435). Located to

the south of the village and east of the Tajareh-Hesar Hasan Beik road, this hill is the largest among four

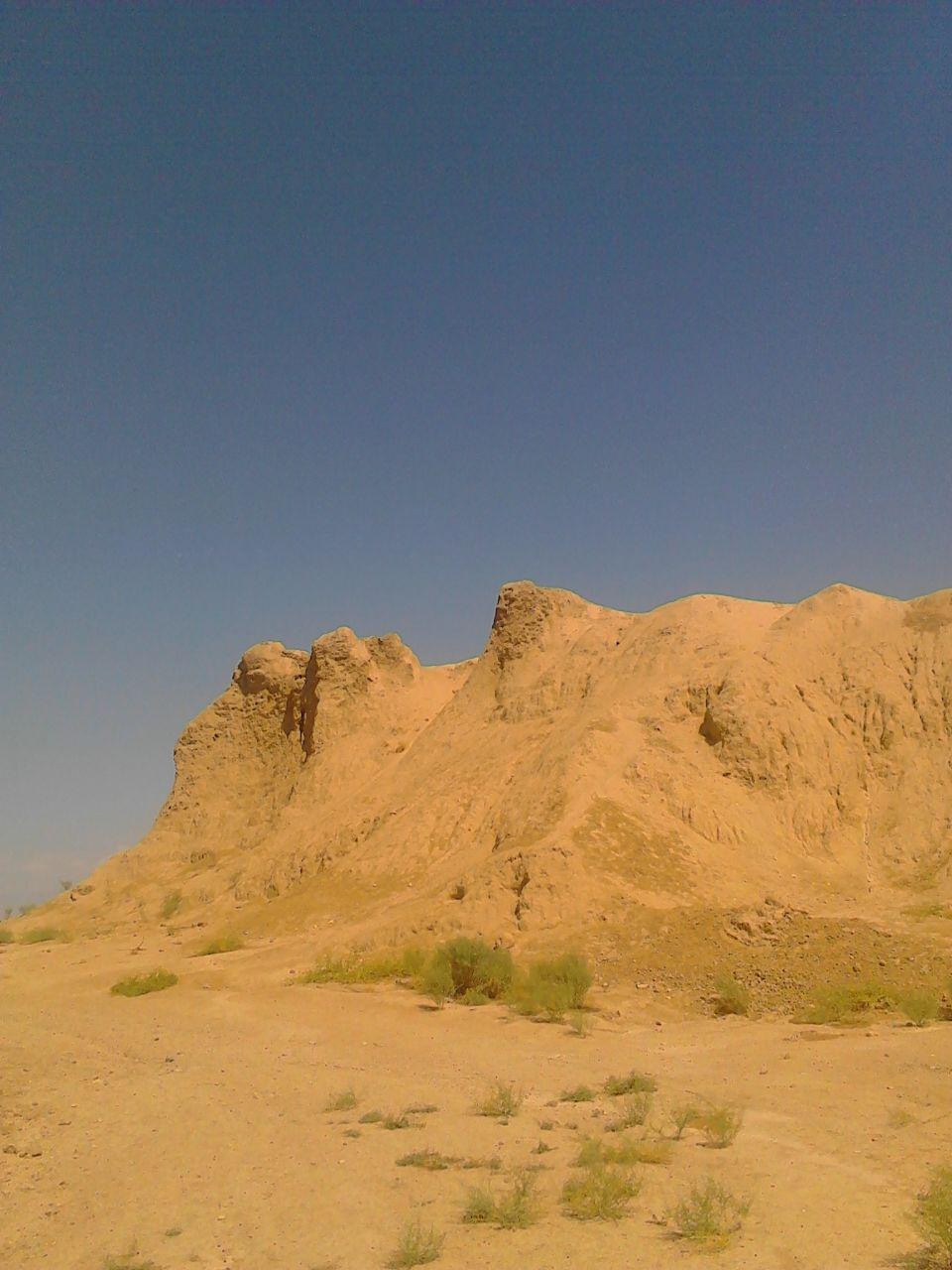
Tajareh Mound, Behnam Arab, Varamin

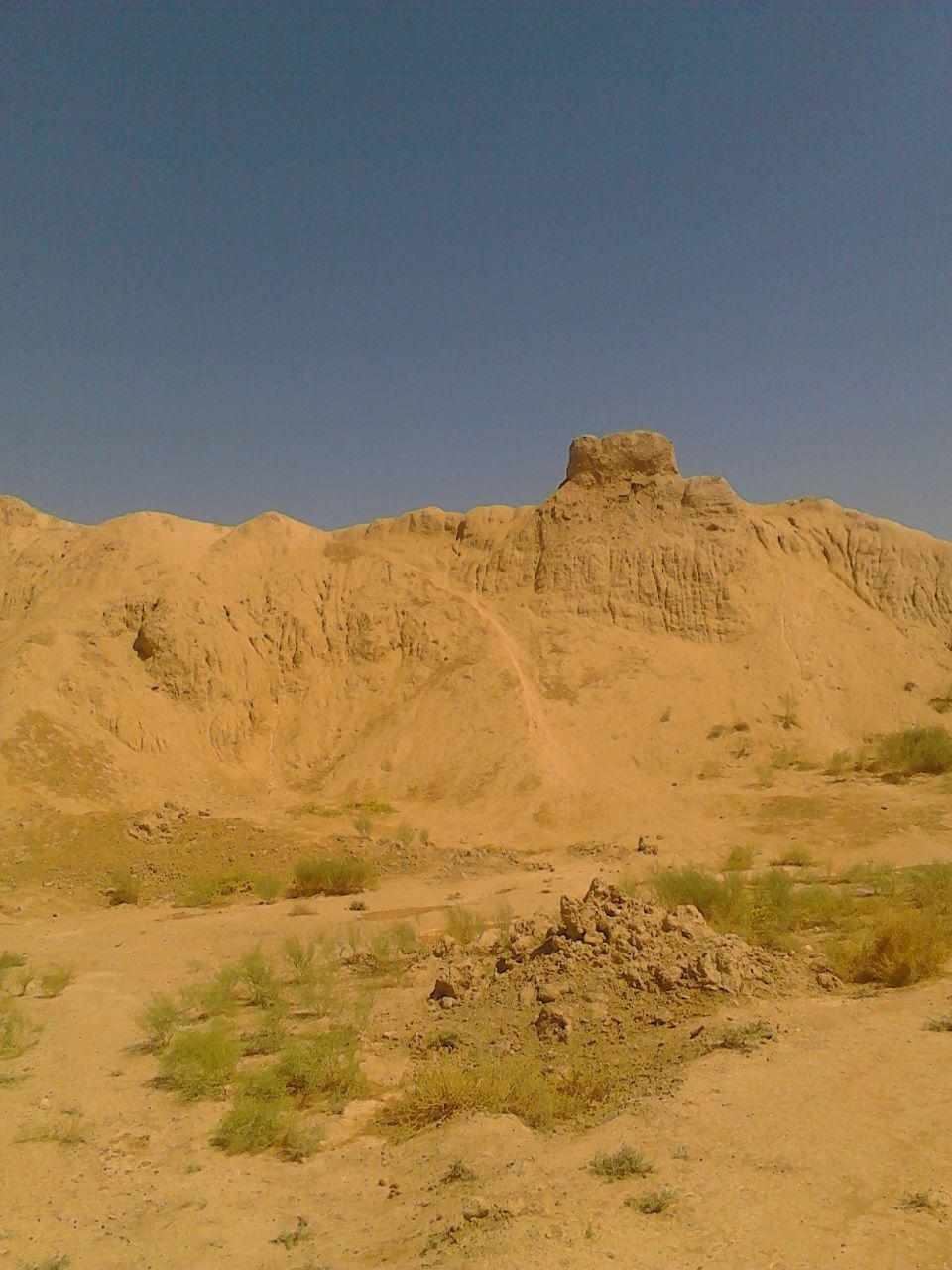
Tajareh Mound, Behnam Arab, Varamin

ancient mounds in the area. It likely dates to the 8th-9th centuries AH.
