= Qanat Kuchek =

Qanat Kuchek (Persian: قنات كوچك) may refer to:

- Qanat Kuchek-e Aqsi
- Qanat Kuchek-e Olya
