= Haft Jubeh =

Haft Jubeh هفت جوبه
- Village
- Location within Iran
- Coordinates: 35°15′10″N 51°40′52″E
- Country: Iran
- Province: Tehran
- County: Varamin
- Bakhsh: Javadabad
- Rural District: Behnamarab-e Jonubi

Population (2006)
  - Total: 335
- Time zone: UTC+3:30 (IRST)
  - Summer (DST): UTC+4:30 (IRDT)

Haft Jubeh (Persian: هفت جوبه, also Romanized as Haft Jūbeh, Haft Chūbah, and Haft Chūbeh) is a village in Behnamarab-e Jonubi Rural District, Javadabad District, Varamin County, Tehran Province, Iran. At the 2006 census, its population was 335, in 79 families.
