= Tappeh-ye Ata =

Tappeh-ye Ata تپه عطا
- Village
- Country: Iran
- Province: Tehran
- County: Varamin
- Bakhsh: Javadabad
- Rural District: Behnamarab-e Jonubi

Population (2006)
  - Total: 125
- Time zone: UTC+3:30 (IRST)
  - Summer (DST): UTC+4:30 (IRDT)

Tappeh-ye Ata (Persian: تپه عطا, also Romanized as Tappeh-ye ʿAṭā) is a village in Behnamarab-e Jonubi Rural District, Javadabad District, Varamin County, Tehran Province, Iran. At the 2006 census, its population was 125, in 42 families.
