= Qasemabad-e Eskander Beyk =

Qasemabad-e Eskander Beyk قاسم‌آباد اسکندربیک
- Village
- Location within Iran
- Coordinates: 35°08′25″N 51°39′13″E
- Country: Iran
- Province: Tehran
- County: Varamin
- Bakhsh: Javadabad
- Rural District: Behnamvasat-e Jonubi

Population (2006)
  - Total: 11
- Time zone: UTC+3:30 (IRST)
  - Summer (DST): UTC+4:30 (IRDT)

Qasemabad-e Eskander Beyk (Persian: قاسم‌آباد اسکندربیک, also Romanized as Qāsemābād-e Esḵander Beyḵ; also known as Qāsemābād) is a village in Behnamvasat-e Jonubi Rural District, Javadabad District, Varamin County, Tehran Province, Iran. At the 2006 census, its population was 11, in 4 families.
