= Hajjiabad-e Salar =

Hajjiabad-e Salar حاجي ابادسالار
- Village
- Location within Iran
- Coordinates: 35°22′29″N 51°38′29″E
- Country: Iran
- Province: Tehran
- County: Varamin
- Bakhsh: Javadabad
- Rural District: Behnamvasat-e Jonubi

Population (2006)
  - Total: 68
- Time zone: UTC+3:30 (IRST)
  - Summer (DST): UTC+4:30 (IRDT)

Hajjiabad-e Salar (Persian: حاجي ابادسالار, also Romanized as Ḩājjīābād-e Sālār; also known as Ḩājjīābād) is a village in Behnamvasat-e Jonubi Rural District, Javadabad District, Varamin County, Tehran Province, Iran. At the 2006 census, its population was 68, in 17 families.
