= Khaveh =

Khaveh or Khaweh (Persian: خاوه) may refer to:

- Khaveh, Markazi
- Khaveh, Qom
- Khaveh, Tehran
