= Taqiabad-e Shahrestan =

Taqiabad-e Shahrestan تقی‌آباد شهرستان
- Village
- Location within Iran
- Coordinates: 35°16′05″N 51°38′38″E
- Country: Iran
- Province: Tehran
- County: Varamin
- Bakhsh: Javadabad
- Rural District: Behnamvasat-e Jonubi

Population (2006)
  - Total: 210
- Time zone: UTC+3:30 (IRST)
  - Summer (DST): UTC+4:30 (IRDT)

Taqiabad-e Shahrestan (Persian: تقی‌آباد شهرستان, also Romanized as Taqīābād-e Shahrestān; also known as Taqīābād) is a village in Behnamvasat-e Jonubi Rural District, Javadabad District, Varamin County, Tehran Province, Iran. At the 2006 census, its population was 210, in 49 families.
