= Salmanabad, Varamin =

Village in Tehran province, Iran

Salmanabad Persian: سلمان اباد
- Village
- Location within Iran
- Coordinates: 35°14′46″N 51°46′18″E
- Country: Iran
- Province: Tehran
- County: Varamin
- District: Javadabad
- Rural District: Behnamarab-e Jonubi

Population (2016)
  - Total: 765
- Time zone: UTC+3:30 (IRST)

Salmanabad (Persian: سلمان اباد) (Note: Also romanized as Salmānābād) is a village in Behnamarab-e Jonubi Rural District of Javadabad District in Varamin County, Tehran province, Iran.

== Demographics ==
=== Population ===
At the time of the 2006 National Census, the village's population was 998 in 242 households. The following census in 2011 counted 824 people in 251 households. The 2016 census measured the population of the village as 765 people in 241 households.
