= Khvajeh Vali-ye Olya =

Khvajeh Vali-ye Olya خواجه ولي عليا
- Village
- Location within Iran
- Coordinates: 35°18′28″N 51°38′09″E
- Country: Iran
- Province: Tehran
- County: Varamin
- Bakhsh: Javadabad
- Rural District: Behnamvasat-e Jonubi

Population (2006)
  - Total: 18
- Time zone: UTC+3:30 (IRST)
  - Summer (DST): UTC+4:30 (IRDT)

Khvajeh Vali-ye Olya (Persian: خواجه ولي عليا, also Romanized as Khvājeh Valī-ye ‘Olyā and Khvājeh Valī-ye Bālā) is a village in Behnamvasat-e Jonubi Rural District, Javadabad District, Varamin County, Tehran Province, Iran. At the 2006 census, its population was 18, in 6 families.
