= Hesar-e Bala, Varamin =

Village in Tehran province, Iran

Hesar-e Bala Persian: حصاربالا
- Village
- Location within Iran
- Coordinates: 35°13′36″N 51°40′08″E
- Country: Iran
- Province: Tehran
- County: Varamin
- District: Javadabad
- Rural District: Behnamarab-e Jonubi

Population (2016)
  - Total: 841
- Time zone: UTC+3:30 (IRST)

Hesar-e Bala (Persian: حصاربالا) (Note: Also romanized as Ḩeşār Bālā and Ḩeşār-e Bālā) is a village in Behnamarab-e Jonubi Rural District of Javadabad District in Varamin County, Tehran province, Iran.

== Demographics ==
=== Population ===
At the time of the 2006 National Census, the village's population was 657 in 147 households. The following census in 2011 counted 758 people in 210 households. The 2016 census measured the population of the village as 841 people in 228 households.
