= Ijdanak =

Ijdanak ايجدانك
- Village
- Location within Iran
- Coordinates: 35°16′59″N 51°36′01″E
- Country: Iran
- Province: Tehran
- County: Varamin
- Bakhsh: Javadabad
- Rural District: Behnamvasat-e Jonubi

Population (2006)
  - Total: 121
- Time zone: UTC+3:30 (IRST)
  - Summer (DST): UTC+4:30 (IRDT)

Ijdanak (Persian: ايجدانك, also Romanized as Ījdānak) is a village in Behnamvasat-e Jonubi Rural District, Javadabad District, Varamin County, Tehran Province, Iran. At the 2006 census, its population was 121, in 36 families.
