= Qaleh Boland =

Village in Tehran province, Iran

Qaleh Boland Persian: قلعه بلند
- Village
- Location within Iran
- Coordinates: 35°12′39″N 51°47′09″E
- Country: Iran
- Province: Tehran
- County: Varamin
- District: Javadabad
- Rural District: Behnamarab-e Jonubi

Population (2016)
  - Total: 713
- Time zone: UTC+3:30 (IRST)

Qaleh Boland (Persian: قلعه بلند) (Note: Also romanized as Qal‘eh Boland) is a village in Behnamarab-e Jonubi Rural District of Javadabad District in Varamin County, Tehran province, Iran.

== Demographics ==
=== Population ===
At the time of the 2006 National Census, the village's population was 781 in 219 households. The following census in 2011 counted 748 people in 235 households. The 2016 census measured the population of the village as 713 people in 243 households.
