= Mowniyeh =

Mowniyeh or Muneyeh (Persian: مونيه) may refer to:

- Muneyeh, Isfahan
- Mowniyeh, Tehran
