= Shamsabad-e Arab =

Shamsabad-e Arab شمس ابادعرب
- Village
- Location within Iran
- Coordinates: 35°14′46″N 51°42′38″E
- Country: Iran
- Province: Tehran
- County: Varamin
- Bakhsh: Javadabad
- Rural District: Behnamarab-e Jonubi

Population (2006)
  - Total: 275
- Time zone: UTC+3:30 (IRST)
  - Summer (DST): UTC+4:30 (IRDT)

Shamsabad-e Arab (Persian: شمس ابادعرب, also Romanized as Shamsābād-e ‘Arab; also known as Shamsābād) is a village in Behnamarab-e Jonubi Rural District, Javadabad District, Varamin County, Tehran Province, Iran. At the 2006 census, its population was 275, in 64 families.
