= Yusefabad-e Khaleseh =

Yusefabad-e Khelaseh يوسف ابادخالصه
- Village
- Location within Iran
- Coordinates: 35°17′29″N 51°51′15″E
- Country: Iran
- Province: Tehran
- County: Varamin
- Bakhsh: Javadabad
- Rural District: Behnamvasat-e Jonubi

Population (2006)
  - Total: 36
- Time zone: UTC+3:30 (IRST)
  - Summer (DST): UTC+4:30 (IRDT)

Yusefabad-e Khaleseh (Persian: يوسف ابادخالصه, also Romanized as Yūsefābād-e Khāleṣeh; also known as Yūsefābād, Yūsofābād, and Yūsufābād) is a village in Behnamvasat-e Jonubi Rural District, Javadabad District, Varamin County, Tehran Province, Iran. At the 2006 census, its population was 36, in 10 families.
