= Toghan, Tehran =

Village in Tehran province, Iran

Toghan Persian: طغان
- Village
- Location within Iran
- Coordinates: 35°11′01″N 51°39′56″E
- Country: Iran
- Province: Tehran
- County: Varamin
- District: Javadabad
- Rural District: Behnamarab-e Jonubi

Population (2016)
  - Total: 662
- Time zone: UTC+3:30 (IRST)

Toghan (Persian: طغان) (Note: Also romanized as Ţoghān) is a village in Behnamarab-e Jonubi Rural District of Javadabad District in Varamin County, Tehran province, Iran.

== Demographics ==
=== Population ===
At the time of the 2006 National Census, the village's population was 753 in 177 households. The following census in 2011 counted 676 people in 192 households. The 2016 census measured the population of the village as 662 people in 197 households.
