= Kahrizak-e Burbur =

Kahrizak-e Burbur كهريزك بوربور
- Village
- Location within Iran
- Coordinates: 35°20′50″N 51°38′33″E
- Country: Iran
- Province: Tehran
- County: Varamin
- Bakhsh: Javadabad
- Rural District: Behnamvasat-e Jonubi

Population (2006)
  - Total: 13
- Time zone: UTC+3:30 (IRST)
  - Summer (DST): UTC+4:30 (IRDT)

Kahrizak-e Burbur (Persian: كهريزك بوربور, also Romanized as Kahrīzak-e Būrbūr; also known as Kahrīzak) is a village in Behnamvasat-e Jonubi Rural District, Javadabad District, Varamin County, Tehran Province, Iran. At the 2006 census, its population was 13, in 5 families.
