= Zavareh Var =

Village in Tehran province, Iran

Zavareh Var Persian: زواره ور
- Village
- Location within Iran
- Coordinates: 35°14′32″N 51°42′59″E
- Country: Iran
- Province: Tehran
- County: Varamin
- District: Javadabad
- Rural District: Behnamarab-e Jonubi

Population (2016)
  - Total: 750
- Time zone: UTC+3:30 (IRST)

Zavareh Var (Persian: زواره ور) (Note: Also romanized as Zavāreh Var) is a village in Behnamarab-e Jonubi Rural District of Javadabad District in Varamin County, Tehran province, Iran.

== Demographics ==
=== Population ===
At the time of the 2006 National Census, the village's population was 966 in 244 households. The following census in 2011 counted 640 people in 182 households. The 2016 census measured the population of the village as 750 people in 224 households.
