= Kajan, Iran =

Kajan (Persian: كاجان) may refer to:

- Kajan, Gilan
- Kajan, Isfahan
- Kajan, Tehran
