= Hesar-e Qazi =

Village in Tehran province, Iran

Hesar-e Qazi Persian: حصارقاضی
- Village
- Location within Iran
- Coordinates: 35°11′15″N 51°41′03″E
- Country: Iran
- Province: Tehran
- County: Varamin
- District: Javadabad
- Rural District: Behnamarab-e Jonubi

Population (2016)
  - Total: 578
- Time zone: UTC+3:30 (IRST)

Hesar-e Qazi (Persian: حصارقاضی) (Note: Also romanized as Ḩeşār Qāẕī and Ḩeşār-e Qāẕī) is a village in Behnamarab-e Jonubi Rural District of Javadabad District in Varamin County, Tehran province, Iran.

== Demographics ==
=== Population ===
At the time of the 2006 National Census, the village's population was 706 in 161 households. The following census in 2011 counted 687 people in 171 households. The 2016 census measured the population of the village as 578 people in 165 households.
