= Khvajeh Vali-ye Sofla =

Village in Tehran, Iran

Khvajeh Vali-ye Sofla خواجه ولي سفلي
- Village
- Location within Iran
- Coordinates: 35°18′06″N 51°37′56″E
- Country: Iran
- Province: Tehran
- County: Varamin
- Bakhsh: Javadabad
- Rural District: Behnamvasat-e Jonubi

Population (2006)
  - Total: 75
- Time zone: UTC+3:30 (IRST)
  - Summer (DST): UTC+4:30 (IRDT)

Khvajeh Vali-ye Sofla (Persian: خواجه ولي سفلي, also Romanized as Khvājeh Valī-ye Soflá; also known as Khvājeh Valī-ye Pā’īn and Khājeh Valī-e Pā’īn) is a village in Behnamvasat-e Jonubi Rural District, Javadabad District, Varamin County, Tehran Province, Iran. At the 2006 census, its population was 75, in 20 families.
