= Qanat Kuchek-e Olya =

Qanat Kuchek-e Olya قنات کوچک علیا
- Village
- Country: Iran
- Province: Tehran
- County: Varamin
- Bakhsh: Javadabad
- Rural District: Behnamarab-e Jonubi

Population (2006)
  - Total: 15
- Time zone: UTC+3:30 (IRST)
  - Summer (DST): UTC+4:30 (IRDT)

Qanat Kuchek-e Olya (Persian: قنات کوچک علیا, also Romanized as Qanāt Kūcheḵ-e ‘Olyā) is a village in Behnamarab-e Jonubi Rural District, Javadabad District, Varamin County, Tehran Province, Iran. At the 2006 census, its population was 15, in 4 families.
