= Rostamabad, Varamin =

Village in Tehran province, Iran

Rostamabad Persian: رستم اباد
- Village
- Location within Iran
- Coordinates: 35°14′45″N 51°40′41″E
- Country: Iran
- Province: Tehran
- County: Varamin
- District: Javadabad
- Rural District: Behnamarab-e Jonubi

Population (2016)
  - Total: 644
- Time zone: UTC+3:30 (IRST)

Rostamabad (Persian: رستم اباد) (Note: Also romanized as Rostamābād; also known as Rustamābād) is a village in Behnamarab-e Jonubi Rural District of Javadabad District in Varamin County, Tehran province, Iran.

== Demographics ==
=== Population ===
At the time of the 2006 National Census, the village's population was 809 in 192 households. The following census in 2011 counted 650 people in 174 households. The 2016 census measured the population of the village as 644 people in 174 households.
