= Mohammadabad-e Arab =

Village in Tehran province, Iran

Mohammadabad-e Arab Persian: محمداباد عرب
- Village
- Location within Iran
- Coordinates: 35°15′47″N 51°43′53″E
- Country: Iran
- Province: Tehran
- County: Varamin
- District: Javadabad
- Rural District: Behnamarab-e Jonubi

Population (2016)
  - Total: 1,965
- Time zone: UTC+3:30 (IRST)

Mohammadabad-e Arab (Persian: محمدابادعرب) (Note: Also romanized as Moḩammadābād-e ‘Arab; also known as Moḩammadābād, Moḩammadābād-e ‘Arabhā, and Muhammadābād) is a village in Behnamarab-e Jonubi Rural District of Javadabad District in Varamin County, Tehran province, Iran.

== Demographics ==
=== Population ===
At the time of the 2006 National Census, the village's population was 2,078 in 500 households. The following census in 2011 counted 1,941 people in 499 households. The 2016 census measured the population of the village as 1,965 people in 581 households. It was the most populous village in its rural district.
