= Qeshlaq-e Shamsabad =

Qeshlaq-e Shamsabad قشلاق شمس اباد
- Village
- Location within Iran
- Coordinates: 35°15′52″N 51°34′03″E
- Country: Iran
- Province: Tehran
- County: Varamin
- Bakhsh: Javadabad
- Rural District: Behnamvasat-e Jonubi

Population (2006)
  - Total: 104
- Time zone: UTC+3:30 (IRST)
  - Summer (DST): UTC+4:30 (IRDT)

Qeshlaq-e Shamsabad (Persian: قشلاق شمس اباد, also Romanized as Qeshlāq-e Shamsābād) is a village in Behnamvasat-e Jonubi Rural District, Javadabad District, Varamin County, Tehran Province, Iran. At the 2006 census, its population was 104, in 23 families.
