= Hesar-e Hasan Beyk =

Village in Tehran province, Iran

Hesar-e Hasan Beyk Persian: حصارحسن بيك
- Village
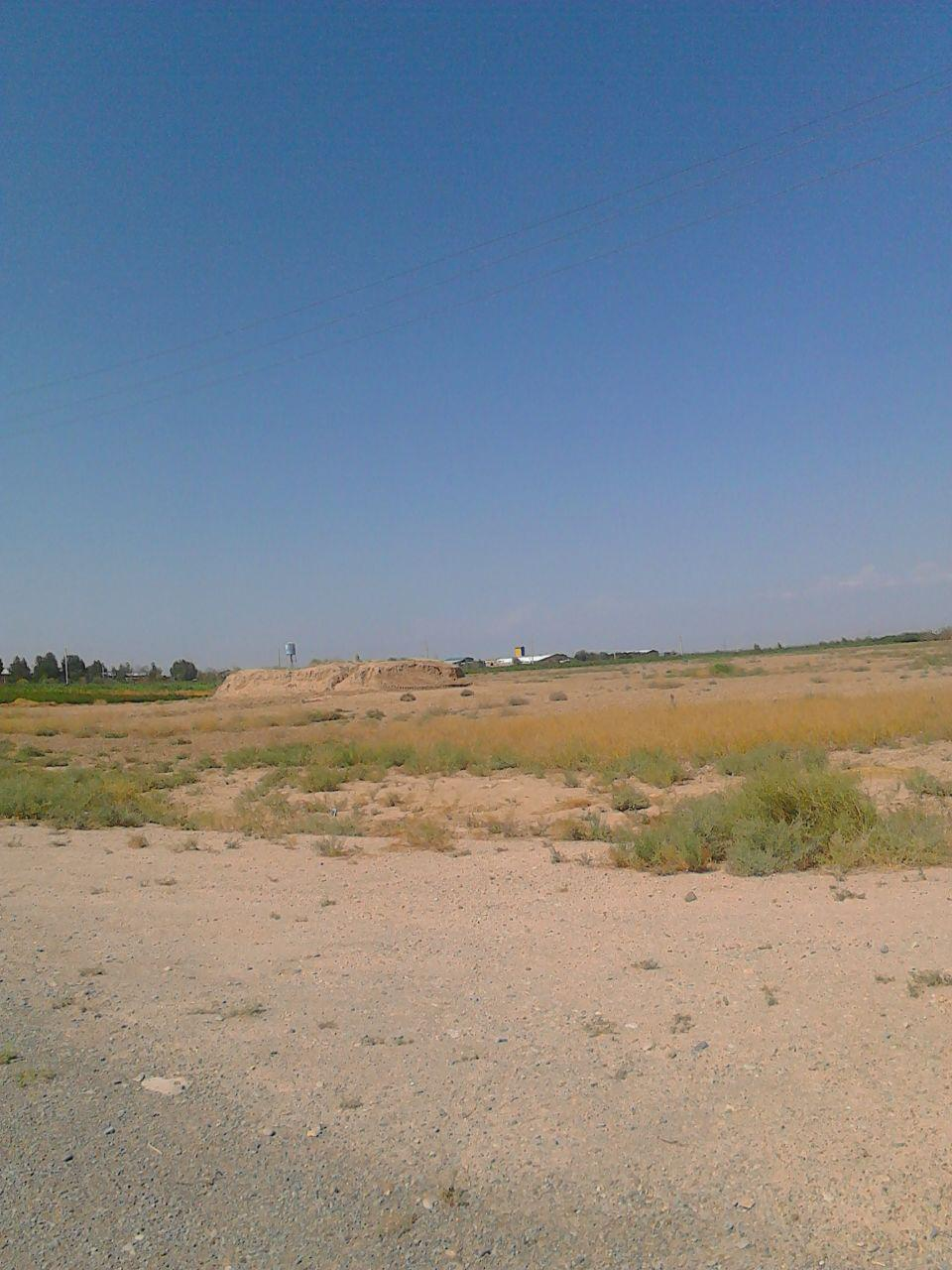
- Landscape near Hesar-e Hasan Beyk

- Location within Iran
- Coordinates: 35°12′28″N 51°42′41″E
- Country: Iran
- Province: Tehran
- County: Varamin
- District: Javadabad
- Rural District: Behnamarab-e Jonubi

Population (2016)
  - Total: 940
- Time zone: UTC+3:30 (IRST)

Hesar-e Hasan Beyk (Persian: حصارحسن بيك) (Note: Also romanized as Ḩeşār-e Ḩasan Beyk; also known as Ḩeşār-e Ḩasan Beyg) is a village in Behnamarab-e Jonubi Rural District of Javadabad District in Varamin County, Tehran province, Iran.

== Demographics ==
=== Population ===
At the time of the 2006 National Census, the village's population was 1,019 in 262 households. The following census in 2011 counted 1,007 people in 305 households. The 2016 census measured the population of the village as 940 people in 291 households.
