= Khaveh, Tehran =

Village in Tehran province, Iran

Khaveh Persian: خاوه
- Village
- Location within Iran
- Coordinates: 35°12′23″N 51°43′41″E
- Country: Iran
- Province: Tehran
- County: Varamin
- District: Javadabad
- Rural District: Behnamarab-e Jonubi

Population (2016)
  - Total: 1,012
- Time zone: UTC+3:30 (IRST)

Khaveh (Persian: خاوه) (Note: Also romanized as Khāveh and Khāweh) is a village in Behnamarab-e Jonubi Rural District of Javadabad District in Varamin County, Tehran province, Iran.

== Demographics ==
=== Population ===
At the time of the 2006 National Census, the village's population was 1,088 in 279 households. The following census in 2011 counted 1,150 people in 309 households. The 2016 census measured the population of the village as 1,012 people in 275 households.
