= Shamsabad, Varamin =

Shamsabad شمس اباد
- Village
- Country: Iran
- Province: Tehran
- County: Varamin
- Bakhsh: Javadabad
- Rural District: Behnamvasat-e Jonubi

Population (2006)
  - Total: 8
- Time zone: UTC+3:30 (IRST)
  - Summer (DST): UTC+4:30 (IRDT)

Shamsabad (Persian: شمس اباد, also Romanized as Shamsābād) is a village in Behnamvasat-e Jonubi Rural District, Javadabad District, Varamin County, Tehran province, Iran. At the 2006 census, its population was 8, in 4 families.
