= Mowniyeh, Tehran =

Mowniyeh مونيه
- Village
- Location within Iran
- Coordinates: 35°16′27″N 51°36′52″E
- Country: Iran
- Province: Tehran
- County: Varamin
- Bakhsh: Javadabad
- Rural District: Behnamvasat-e Jonubi

Population (2006)
  - Total: 19
- Time zone: UTC+3:30 (IRST)
  - Summer (DST): UTC+4:30 (IRDT)

Mowniyeh (Persian: مونيه, also Romanized as Mownīyeh) is a village in Behnamvasat-e Jonubi Rural District, Javadabad District, Varamin County, Tehran Province, Iran. At the 2006 census, its population was 19, in 6 families.
