= Anbaj =

Anbaj انباج
- village
- Location within Iran
- Coordinates: 35°50′59″N 51°40′34″E
- Country: Iran
- Province: Tehran
- County: Shemiranat
- Bakhsh: Lavasanat
- Rural District: Lavasan-e Kuchak
- Elevation: 1,950–2,050 m (6,400–6,730 ft)

Population (2006)
  - Total: 411
- Time zone: UTC+3:30 (IRST)
  - Summer (DST): UTC+4:30 (IRDT)

Anbaj (Persian: انباج, also Romanized as Anbāj) is a village in Lavasan Rural District, Lavasanat District, Shemiranat County, Tehran Province, Iran. At the 2006 census, its population was 411, in 113 families.
