= Rang Raz =

Rang Raz رنگرز
- Village
- Location within Iran
- Coordinates: 35°34′06″N 50°59′57″E
- Country: Iran
- Province: Tehran
- County: Shahriar
- Bakhsh: Central
- Rural District: Juqin

Population (2006)
  - Total: 369
- Time zone: UTC+3:30 (IRST)
  - Summer (DST): UTC+4:30 (IRDT)

Rang Raz (Persian: رنگرز) is a village in Juqin Rural District, in the Central District of Shahriar County, Tehran Province, Iran. At the 2006 census, its population was 369, in 96 families.
