= Posht-e Larijan =

Posht-e Larijan پشت لاريجان
- Village
- Country: Iran
- Province: Tehran
- County: Shemiranat
- Bakhsh: Lavasanat
- Rural District: Lavasan-e Kuchak

Population (2006)
  - Total: 19
- Time zone: UTC+3:30 (IRST)
  - Summer (DST): UTC+4:30 (IRDT)

Posht-e Larijan (Persian: پشت لاريجان, also Romanized as Posht-e Lārījān) is a village in Lavasan-e Kuchak Rural District, Lavasanat District, Shemiranat County, Tehran Province, Iran. At the 2006 census, its population was 19, in 7 families.
