= Hesar-e Chupan =

Hesar-e Chupan حصارچوپان
- Village
- Location within Iran
- Coordinates: 35°30′10″N 51°10′49″E
- Country: Iran
- Province: Tehran
- County: Rey
- Bakhsh: Fashapuyeh
- Rural District: Koleyn

Population (2006)
  - Total: 23
- Time zone: UTC+3:30 (IRST)
  - Summer (DST): UTC+4:30 (IRDT)

Hesar-e Chupan (Persian: حصارچوپان, also Romanized as Ḩeşār-e Chūpān) is a village in Koleyn Rural District, Fashapuyeh District, Ray County, Tehran Province, Iran. At the 2006 census, its population was 23, in 4 families.
