= Safiabad, Tehran =

Safiabad صفي اباد
- Village
- Location within Iran
- Coordinates: 35°35′57″N 50°32′10″E
- Country: Iran
- Province: Tehran
- County: Malard
- Bakhsh: Central
- Rural District: Akhtarabad

Population (2006)
  - Total: 40
- Time zone: UTC+3:30 (IRST)
  - Summer (DST): UTC+4:30 (IRDT)

Safiabad (Persian: صفي اباد, also Romanized as Şafīābād) is a village in Akhtarabad Rural District, in the Central District of Malard County, Tehran Province, Iran. At the 2006 census, its population was 40, in 8 families.
