= Vareh =

Vareh ويره
- Village
- Country: Iran
- Province: Tehran
- County: Shahriar
- Bakhsh: Central
- Rural District: Qaemabad

Population (2006)
  - Total: 15,318
- Time zone: UTC+3:30 (IRST)
  - Summer (DST): UTC+4:30 (IRDT)

Vareh (Persian: ويره) is a village in Qaemabad Rural District, in the Central District of Shahriar County, Tehran Province, Iran. At the 2006 census, its population was 15,318, in 3,735 families.
