= Owzen Darreh-ye Pain =

Owzen Darreh-ye Pain اوزن دره پايين
- Village
- Interactive map of Owzen Darreh-ye Pain
- Coordinates: 35°39′31.6″N 52°01′56.42″E
- Country: Iran
- Province: Tehran
- County: Damavand
- Bakhsh: Central
- Rural District: Tarrud

Population (2006)
  - Total: 17
- Time zone: UTC+3:30 (IRST)

Owzen Darreh-ye Pain (Persian: اوزن دره پايين, also Romanized as Owzen Darreh-ye Pā’īn) is a village in Tarrud Rural District, in the Central District of Damavand County, Tehran Province, Iran. At the 2006 census, its population was 17, with 4 families. In 2016, the recorded population was 0.
