= Sharifabad, Rey =

Sharifabad شريف اباد
- Village
- Location within Iran
- Coordinates: 35°30′14″N 51°20′44″E
- Country: Iran
- Province: Tehran
- County: Rey
- Bakhsh: Kahrizak
- Rural District: Kahrizak

Population (2006)
  - Total: 31
- Time zone: UTC+3:30 (IRST)
  - Summer (DST): UTC+4:30 (IRDT)

Sharifabad (Persian: شريف اباد, also Romanized as Sharīfābād) is a village in Kahrizak Rural District, Kahrizak District, Ray County, Tehran Province, Iran. At the 2006 census, its population was 31, in 7 families.
