= Gacheh =

Gacheh گچه
- village
- Location within Iran
- Coordinates: 35°31′12″N 52°31′03″E
- Country: Iran
- Province: Tehran
- County: Firuzkuh
- Bakhsh: Central
- Rural District: Hablerud
- Elevation: 1,450 m (4,760 ft)

Population (2006)
  - Total: 117
- Time zone: UTC+3:30 (IRST)

Gacheh (Persian: گچه) is a village in Hablerud Rural District, in the Central District of Firuzkuh County, Tehran Province, Iran.

At the time of the 2006 National Census, the village's population was 185 in 51 households. The following census in 2011 counted 232 people in 71 households. The 2016 census measured the population of the village as 117 people in 55 households.
