= Vazna =

Vazna وزنا
- village
- Location within Iran
- Coordinates: 35°48′00″N 52°18′58″E
- Country: Iran
- Province: Tehran
- County: Firuzkuh
- Bakhsh: Arjomand
- Rural District: Doboluk
- Elevation: 2,760 m (9,060 ft)

Population (2006)
  - Total: 357
- Time zone: UTC+3:30 (IRST)
  - Summer (DST): UTC+4:30 (IRDT)

Vazna (Persian: وزنا, also Romanized as Vaznā) is a village in Doboluk Rural District, Arjomand District, Firuzkuh County, Tehran Province, Iran. At the 2006 census, its population was 357, in 95 families.
