= Qaleh-ye Aref =

Qaleh-ye Aref قلعه عارف
- Village
- Location within Iran
- Coordinates: 35°24′30″N 51°45′46″E
- Country: Iran
- Province: Tehran
- County: Pakdasht
- Bakhsh: Sharifabad
- Rural District: Karimabad

Population (2006)
  - Total: 40
- Time zone: UTC+3:30 (IRST)
  - Summer (DST): UTC+4:30 (IRDT)

Qaleh-ye Aref (Persian: قلعه عارف, also Romanized as Qal‘eh-ye ‘Āref) is a village in Karimabad Rural District, Sharifabad District, Pakdasht County, Tehran Province, Iran. At the 2006 census, its population was 40, in 14 families.
