= Kharam Deh =

Kharam Deh خرم ده
- Village
- Interactive map of Kharam Deh
- Coordinates: 35°38′19.38″N 52°00′20.27″E
- Country: Iran
- Province: Tehran
- County: Damavand
- Bakhsh: Central
- Rural District: Tarrud

Population (2016)
  - Total: 228
- Time zone: UTC+3:30 (IRST)

Kharam Deh (Persian: خرم ده) is a village in Tarrud Rural District, in the Central District of Damavand County, Tehran Province, Iran. At the 2016 census, its population was 228, in 69 families.
