= Eshtaharzan =

Eshtaharzan اشتهازان
- Village
- Location within Iran
- Coordinates: 35°18′46″N 51°23′40″E
- Country: Iran
- Province: Tehran
- County: Rey
- Bakhsh: Fashapuyeh
- Rural District: Koleyn

Population (2006)
  - Total: 14
- Time zone: UTC+3:30 (IRST)
  - Summer (DST): UTC+4:30 (IRDT)

Eshtaharzan (Persian: اشتهازان, also Romanized as Eshtahārzān; also known as Eshtahāzān and Eshtehāzān) is a village in Koleyn Rural District, Fashapuyeh District, Ray County, Tehran Province, Iran. At the 2006 census, its population was 14, in 5 families.
