= Hizom Darreh =

Hizom Darreh هيزم‌دره
- Village
- Location within Iran
- Coordinates: 35°46′13″N 51°48′54″E
- Country: Iran
- Province: Tehran
- County: Shemiranat
- Bakhsh: Lavasanat
- Rural District: Lavasan-e Bozorg

Population (2006)
  - Total: 27
- Time zone: UTC+3:30 (IRST)
  - Summer (DST): UTC+4:30 (IRDT)

Hizom Darreh (Persian: هيزم‌دره, also Romanized as Hīzom Darreh; also known as Khānlarābād) is a village in Lavasan-e Bozorg Rural District, Lavasanat District, Shemiranat County, Tehran Province, Iran. At the 2006 census, its population was 27, in 9 families.
