= Aruzhqoli =

Aruzhqoli اروژقلي
- Village
- Country: Iran
- Province: Tehran
- County: Damavand
- Bakhsh: Rudehen
- Rural District: Mehrabad

Population (2006)
  - Total: 11
- Time zone: UTC+3:30 (IRST)

Aruzhqoli (Persian: اروژقلي, also Romanized as Ārūzhqolī) is a village in Mehrabad Rural District, Rudehen District, Damavand County, Tehran Province, Iran. At the 2006 census, its population was 11, in 4 households.

The village had less than 4 households in 2016.
