= Chaltasian =

Chaltasian چال تاسيان
- village
- Location within Iran
- Coordinates: 35°20′24″N 51°41′53″E
- Country: Iran
- Province: Tehran
- County: Pishva
- Bakhsh: Central
- Rural District: Asgariyeh
- Elevation: 945 m (3,100 ft)

Population (2006)
  - Total: 444
- Time zone: UTC+3:30 (IRST)
  - Summer (DST): UTC+4:30 (IRDT)

Chaltasian (Persian: چال تاسيان, also Romanized as Chāltāsīān, Chāltāsīyān, Chāltāsīyown, Chāltāsīyūn, and Chātāseyān) is a village in Asgariyeh Rural District, in the Central District of Pishva County, Tehran Province, Iran. At the 2006 census, its population was 444, in 108 families.
