= Zarman =

Zarman زرمان
- village
- Location within Iran
- Coordinates: 35°47′57″N 52°18′28″E
- Country: Iran
- Province: Tehran
- County: Firuzkuh
- Bakhsh: Arjomand
- Rural District: Doboluk
- Elevation: 2,750 m (9,020 ft)

Population (2006)
  - Total: 200
- Time zone: UTC+3:30 (IRST)
  - Summer (DST): UTC+4:30 (IRDT)

Zarman (Persian: زرمان, also Romanized as Zarmān and Zarmun) is a village in Doboluk Rural District, Arjomand District, Firuzkuh County, Tehran Province, Iran. At the 2006 census, its population was 200, in 51 families.
