= Shahrak-e Mustafa Khomeyni, Tehran =

Shahrak-e Mustafa Khomeyni شهرک مصطفی خمینی
- Village
- Country: Iran
- Province: Tehran
- County: Shahriar
- Bakhsh: Central
- Rural District: Qaemabad

Population (2006)
  - Total: 10,807
- Time zone: UTC+3:30 (IRST)
  - Summer (DST): UTC+4:30 (IRDT)

Shahrak-e Mustafa Khomeyni (Persian: شهرک مصطفی خمینی, also Romanized as Shahrak-e Muṣṭafa Khomeynī) is a village in Qaemabad Rural District, in the Central District of Shahriar County, Tehran Province, Iran. At the 2006 census, its population was 10,807, in 2,654 families.
