= Tamisian =

Tamisian تميسيان
- village
- Location within Iran
- Coordinates: 35°37′23″N 51°56′49″E
- Country: Iran
- Province: Tehran
- County: Damavand
- Bakhsh: Central
- Rural District: Tarrud
- Elevation: 1,580 m (5,180 ft)

Population (2016)
  - Total: 128
- Time zone: UTC+3:30 (IRST)

Tamisian (Persian: تميسيان, also Romanized as Tamīsīān, Tamesīān, Tamīsīyān, and Tamīzīān) is a village in Tarrud Rural District, in the Central District of Damavand County, Tehran Province, Iran. At the 2016 census, its population was 128, in 48 families. Up from 107 in 2006.
