= Kabutardarreh =

Kabutardarreh كبوتردره
- village
- Location within Iran
- Coordinates: 35°25′37″N 52°25′56″E
- Country: Iran
- Province: Tehran
- County: Firuzkuh
- Bakhsh: Central
- Rural District: Hablerud
- Elevation: 1,260 m (4,130 ft)

Population (2016)
  - Total: 110
- Time zone: UTC+3:30 (IRST)

Kabutardarreh (Persian: كبوتردره, also Romanized as Kabūtardarreh) is a village in Hablerud Rural District, in the Central District of Firuzkuh County, Tehran Province, Iran.

At the time of the 2006 National Census, the village's population was 174 in 50 households. The following census in 2011 counted 166 people in 66 households. The 2016 census measured the population of the village as 110 people in 36 households.
