= Hoseynabad, Damavand =

Hoseynabad حسين آباد
- Village
- Location within Iran
- Coordinates: 35°39′00″N 52°01′00″E
- Country: Iran
- Province: Tehran
- County: Damavand
- Bakhsh: Central
- Rural District: Tarrud

Population (2016)
  - Total: 25
- Time zone: UTC+3:30 (IRST)

Hoseynabad (Persian: حسين آباد, also Romanized as Ḩoseynābād) is a village in Tarrud Rural District, in the Central District of Damavand County, Tehran Province, Iran. At the 2016 census, its population was 25, in 6 families. Decreased from 56 people in 2006.
