= Deh Gardan =

Deh Gardan دهگردان
- village
- Location within Iran
- Coordinates: 35°33′26″N 52°35′49″E
- Country: Iran
- Province: Tehran
- County: Firuzkuh
- Bakhsh: Central
- Rural District: Hablerud
- Elevation: 1,580 m (5,180 ft)

Population (2016)
  - Total: 175
- Time zone: UTC+3:30 (IRST)

Deh Gardan (Persian: دهگردان, also Romanized as Deh Gardān) is a village that is located in Hablerud Rural District, in the Central District of Firuzkuh County, Tehran Province, Iran.

At the time of the 2006 National Census, the village's population was 550 in 160 households. The following census in 2011 counted 474 people in 170 households. The 2016 census measured the population of the village as 175 people in 77 households.
