= Hariaj =

Hariaj هرياج
- village
- Location within Iran
- Coordinates: 35°38′56″N 52°35′44″E
- Country: Iran
- Province: Tehran
- County: Firuzkuh
- Bakhsh: Central
- Rural District: Hablerud
- Elevation: 1,950 m (6,400 ft)

Population (2016)
  - Total: 6
- Time zone: UTC+3:30 (IRST)

Hariaj (Persian: هرياج, also Romanized as Harīāj) is a village in Hablerud Rural District, in the Central District of Firuzkuh County, Tehran Province, Iran.

At the time of the 2006 National Census, the village's population was 21 in 9 households. The following census in 2011 counted less than 4 households. The 2016 census measured the population of the village as six people in five households. It was the most populous village in its rural district.
