= Bu ol Qeytas =

Bu ol Qeytas بوالقيطاس
- Village
- Location within Iran
- Coordinates: 35°13′47″N 51°29′33″E
- Country: Iran
- Province: Tehran
- County: Rey
- Bakhsh: Fashapuyeh
- Rural District: Koleyn

Population (2006)
  - Total: 11
- Time zone: UTC+3:30 (IRST)
  - Summer (DST): UTC+4:30 (IRDT)

Bu ol Qeytas (Persian: بوالقيطاس, also Romanized as Bū ol Qeyţās and Bowlqeyţās; also known as Belghitas) is a village in Koleyn Rural District, Fashapuyeh District, Ray County, Tehran Province, Iran. At the 2006 census, its population was 11, in 4 families.
