= Mosha =

Neighborhood in Tehran province, Iran

Mosha Persian: مشا
- Neighborhood
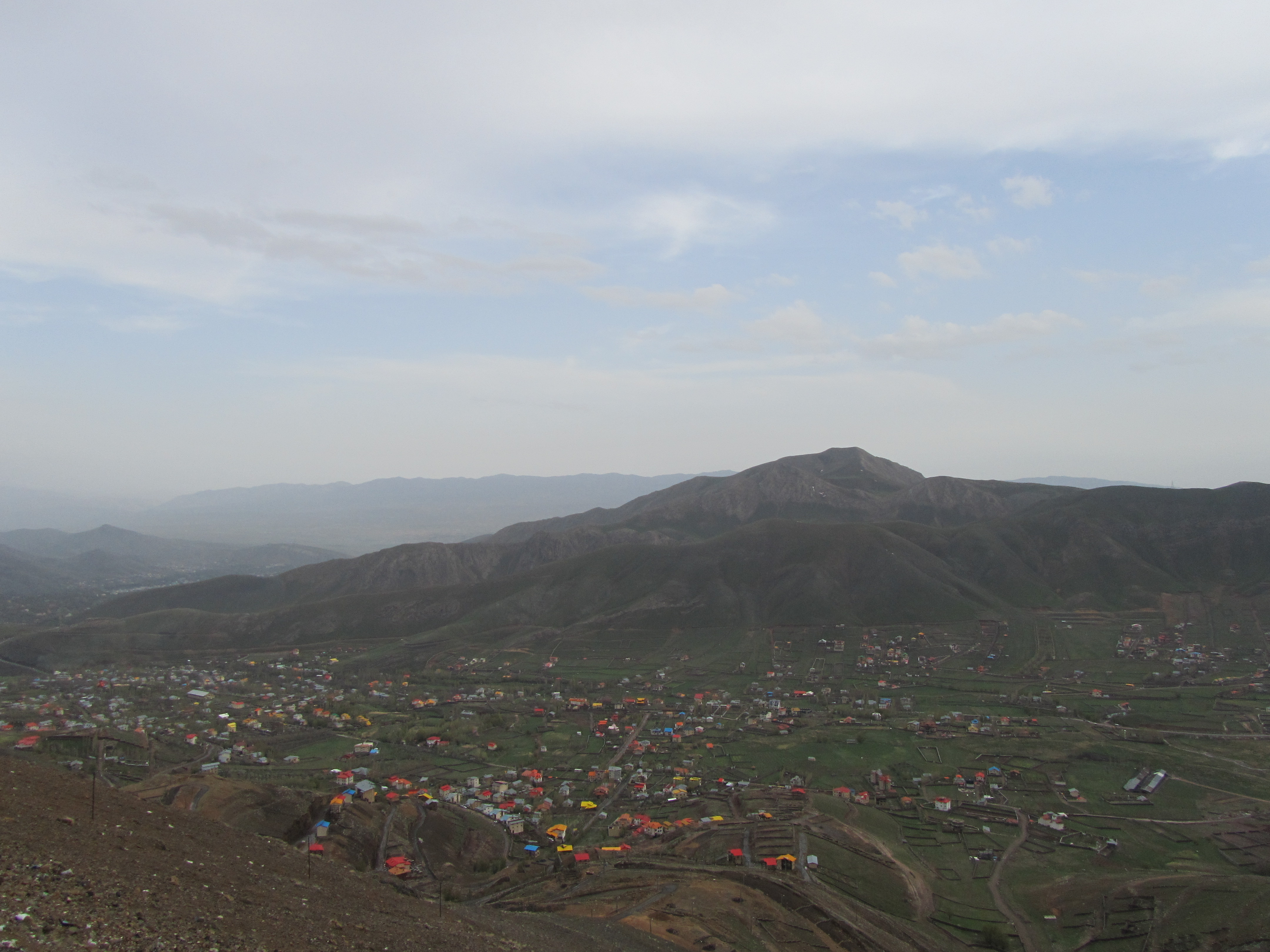
- The neighborhood of Mosha in the city of Damavand

- Location within Iran
- Coordinates: 35°45′59″N 52°01′31″E
- Country: Iran
- Province: Tehran
- County: Damavand
- District: Central
- City: Damavand
- Elevation: 2,280–2,380 m (7,480–7,810 ft)

Population (2016)
  - Total: 741
- Time zone: UTC+3:30 (IRST)

Mosha (Persian: مشا) (Note: Also romanized as Mashā' and Moshā') is a neighborhood in the city of Damavand in the Central District of Damavand County, Tehran province, Iran.

== Demographics ==
=== Population ===
At the time of the 2006 National Census, Mosha's population was 1,542 in 454 households, when it was a village in Tarrud Rural District. The following census in 2011 counted 1,487 people in 442 households. The 2016 census measured the population of the village as 741 people in 247 households.

Mosha was annexed by the city of Damavand in 2021.
