= Torpaq Tappeh =

Torpaq Tappeh ترپاق تپه
- Village
- Location within Iran
- Coordinates: 35°35′17″N 50°58′58″E
- Country: Iran
- Province: Tehran
- County: Shahriar
- Bakhsh: Central
- Rural District: Juqin

Population (2006)
  - Total: 586
- Time zone: UTC+3:30 (IRST)
  - Summer (DST): UTC+4:30 (IRDT)

Torpaq Tappeh (Persian: ترپاق تپه, also Romanized as Torpāq Tappeh, Tarpāq Tappeh, Tūrpākh Tappeh, and Turpākh Tepe; also known as Taryāq Tappeh) is a village in Juqin Rural District, in the Central District of Shahriar County, Tehran Province, Iran. At the 2006 census, its population was 586, in 153 families.
