= Valiabad-e Jazairi =

Valiabad-e Jazairi ولي ابادجزايري
- Village
- Location within Iran
- Coordinates: 35°36′59″N 50°35′02″E
- Country: Iran
- Province: Tehran
- County: Malard
- Bakhsh: Central
- Rural District: Akhtarabad

Population (2006)
  - Total: 33
- Time zone: UTC+3:30 (IRST)
  - Summer (DST): UTC+4:30 (IRDT)

Valiabad-e Jazairi (Persian: ولي ابادجزايري, also Romanized as Valīābād-e Jazāīrī; also known as Valīābād) is a village in Akhtarabad Rural District, in the Central District of Malard County, Tehran Province, Iran. At the 2006 census, its population was 33, in 8 families.
