= Khomedeh =

Khomedeh خمده
- village
- Location within Iran
- Coordinates: 35°40′03″N 52°41′08″E
- Country: Iran
- Province: Tehran
- County: Firuzkuh
- Bakhsh: Central
- Rural District: Shahrabad
- Elevation: 1,750 m (5,740 ft)

Population (2016)
  - Total: 97
- Time zone: UTC+3:30 (IRST)

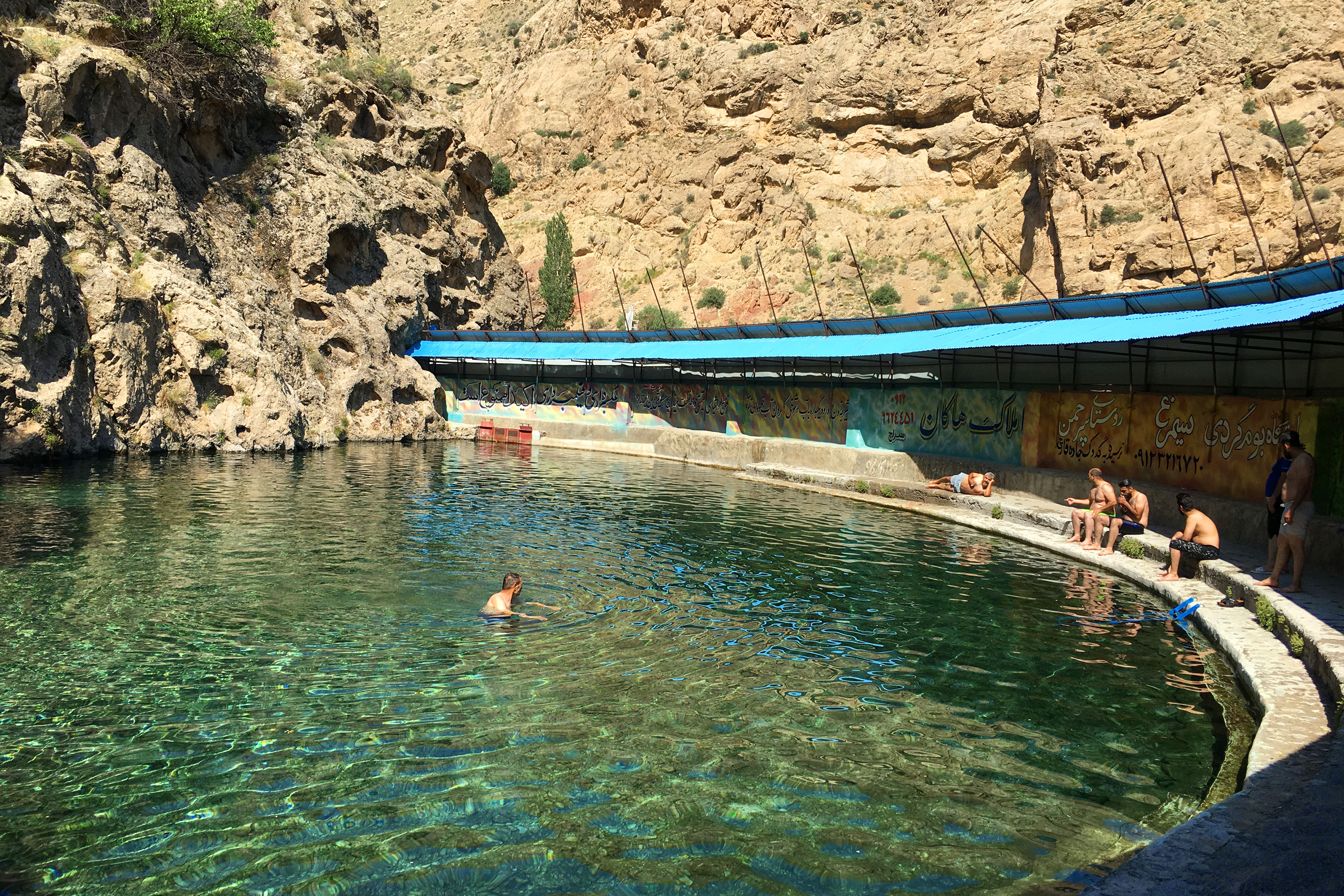
Khomdeh, Firuzkuh, Tehran, Iran

Khomedeh (Persian: خمده, also Romanized as Hamdeh, Khamdeh, Khamīdeh, and Khomdeh) is a village in Shahrabad Rural District, in the Central District of Firuzkuh County, Tehran Province, Iran.

At the time of the 2006 National Census, the village's population was 255 in 63 households. The following census in 2011 counted 196 people in 66 households. The 2016 census measured the population of the village as 97 people in 43 households.
