= Shesh Debanlu =

Shesh Debanlu شش دبانلو
- Village
- Location within Iran
- Coordinates: 35°39′13″N 50°48′12″E
- Country: Iran
- Province: Tehran
- County: Malard
- Bakhsh: Central
- Rural District: Bibi Sakineh

Population (2006)
  - Total: 523
- Time zone: UTC+3:30 (IRST)
  - Summer (DST): UTC+4:30 (IRDT)

Shesh Debanlu (Persian: شش دبانلو, also Romanized as Shesh Debānlū; also known as Shesh) is a village in Bibi Sakineh Rural District, in the Central District of Malard County, Tehran Province, Iran. At the 2006 census, its population was 523, in 128 families.
