= Takhteh Ha =

Takhteh Ha تخته ها
- Village
- Location within Iran
- Coordinates: 35°40′08″N 51°53′06″E
- Country: Iran
- Province: Tehran
- County: Damavand
- Bakhsh: Rudehen
- Rural District: Mehrabad

Population (2006)
  - Total: 25
- Time zone: UTC+3:30 (IRST)

Takhteh Ha (Persian: تخته ها, also Romanized as Takhteh Hā and Takhtehhā) is a village in Mehrabad Rural District, Rudehen District, Damavand County, Tehran Province, Iran. At the 2006 census, its population was 25, in 4 families.

At the time of the 2006 National Census, the village's population was 25 in 4 households. The 2011 and 2016 census results counted less than 4 households.
