= Meydan-e Tirzhandarmari =

Meydan-e Tirzhandarmari ميدان تيرژاندارمري
- Village
- Country: Iran
- Province: Tehran
- County: Rey
- Bakhsh: Kahrizak
- Rural District: Kahrizak

Population (2006)
  - Total: 14
- Time zone: UTC+3:30 (IRST)
  - Summer (DST): UTC+4:30 (IRDT)

Meydan-e Tirzhandarmari (Persian: ميدان تيرژاندارمري, also Romanized as Meydān-e Tīrzhāndārmarī) is a village in Kahrizak Rural District, Kahrizak District, Ray County, Tehran Province, Iran. According to the 2006 census, its population was 14, living in 4 families.
