= Gazarkhani-ye Seyyedabad =

Gazarkhani-ye Seyyedabad گذرخانی سيدآباد
- Village
- Interactive map of Gazarkhani-ye Seyyedabad
- Country: Iran
- Province: Tehran
- County: Firuzkuh
- Bakhsh: Central
- Rural District: Hablerud

Population (2016)
  - Total: 90
- Time zone: UTC+3:30 (IRST)

Gazarkhani-ye Seyyedabad (Persian: گذرخانی سيدآباد, also Romanized as Gaẕarkhānī-ye Seyyedābād) is a village in Hablerud Rural District, in the Central District of Firuzkuh County, Tehran Province, Iran.

At the time of the 2006 National Census, the village's population was 38 in 14 households. The following census in 2011 counted 25 people in nine households. The 2016 census measured the population of the village as 90 people in 34 households.
