= Lasem Cheshmeh =

Lasem Cheshmeh لاسم چشمه
- Village
- Location within Iran
- Coordinates: 35°44′20″N 52°42′34″E
- Country: Iran
- Province: Tehran
- County: Firuzkuh
- Bakhsh: Central
- Rural District: Shahrabad

Population (2016)
  - Total: 87
- Time zone: UTC+3:30 (IRST)

Lasem Cheshmeh (Persian: لاسم چشمه, also Romanized as Lāsem Cheshmeh; also known as Lāsem Cheshmeh-ye Bālā, Lām Cheshmeh, Lasein, and Lāsim) is a village in Shahrabad Rural District, in the Central District of Firuzkuh County, Tehran Province, Iran.

At the time of the 2006 National Census, the village's population was 104 in 30 households. The following census in 2011 counted 207 people in 49 households. The 2016 census measured the population of the village as 87 people in 27 households.
