= Kamaliyeh =

Kamaliyeh كماليه
- Village
- Location within Iran
- Coordinates: 35°21′00″N 51°19′00″E
- Country: Iran
- Province: Tehran
- County: Rey
- Bakhsh: Fashapuyeh
- Rural District: Hasanabad

Population (2006)
  - Total: 52
- Time zone: UTC+3:30 (IRST)
  - Summer (DST): UTC+4:30 (IRDT)

Kamaliyeh (Persian: كماليه, also romanized as Kamālīyeh) is a village in Hasanabad Rural District, Fashapuyeh District, Ray County, Tehran Province, Iran. At the 2006 census, its population was 52, in 10 families.
