= Kolugan =

Kolugan كلوگان
- Village
- Location within Iran
- Coordinates: 35°52′15″N 51°32′52″E
- Country: Iran
- Province: Tehran
- County: Shemiranat
- Bakhsh: Rudbar-e Qasran
- Rural District: Rudbar-e Qasran

Population (2006)
  - Total: 380
- Time zone: UTC+3:30 (IRST)
  - Summer (DST): UTC+4:30 (IRDT)

Kolugan (Persian: كلوگان, also Romanized as Kolūgān; also known as Golūkān) is a village in Rudbar-e Qasran Rural District, Rudbar-e Qasran District, Shemiranat County, Tehran Province, Iran. At the 2006 census, its population was 380, in 108 families.
