= Zarrin Deh, Tehran =

Zarrin Deh زرين ده
- village
- Location within Iran
- Coordinates: 35°37′00″N 50°27′00″E
- Country: Iran
- Province: Tehran
- County: Malard
- Bakhsh: Central
- Rural District: Akhtarabad

Population (2006)
  - Total: 74
- Time zone: UTC+3:30 (IRST)
  - Summer (DST): UTC+4:30 (IRDT)

Zarrin Deh (Persian: زرين ده, also Romanized as Zarrīn Deh; also known as Kesht va Sanʿat Jāvīd) is a village in Akhtarabad Rural District, in the Central District of Malard County, Tehran Province, Iran. At the 2006 census, its population was 74, in 15 families.
