= Daryabak =

Daryabak دريابك
- Village
- Location within Iran
- Coordinates: 35°45′03″N 52°31′48″E
- Country: Iran
- Province: Tehran
- County: Firuzkuh
- Bakhsh: Arjomand
- Rural District: Doboluk

Population (2006)
  - Total: 27
- Time zone: UTC+3:30 (IRST)
  - Summer (DST): UTC+4:30 (IRDT)

Daryabak (Persian: دريابك, also Romanized as Daryābaḵ) is a village in Doboluk Rural District, Arjomand District, Firuzkuh County, Tehran Province, Iran. At the 2006 census, its population was 27, in 9 families.
