= Maftun =

Maftun مافتون
- Village
- Location within Iran
- Coordinates: 35°30′13″N 51°24′40″E
- Country: Iran
- Province: Tehran
- County: Rey
- Bakhsh: Kahrizak
- Rural District: Kahrizak

Population (2006)
  - Total: 155
- Time zone: UTC+3:30 (IRST)
  - Summer (DST): UTC+4:30 (IRDT)

Maftun (Persian: مافتون, also Romanized as Māftūn) is a village in Kahrizak Rural District, Kahrizak District, Ray County, Tehran Province, Iran. At the 2006 census, its population was 155, in 36 families.
