= Shahrak-e Enqelab, Tehran =

Shahrak-e Enqelab شهرک انقلاب
- Village
- Location within Iran
- Coordinates: 35°30′56″N 51°41′12″E
- Country: Iran
- Province: Tehran
- County: Pakdasht
- Bakhsh: Central
- Rural District: Hesar-e Amir

Population (2006)
  - Total: 10,344
- Time zone: UTC+3:30 (IRST)
  - Summer (DST): UTC+4:30 (IRDT)

Shahrak-e Enqelab (Persian: شهرک انقلاب, also Romanized as Shahrak-e Enqelāb) is a village in Hesar-e Amir Rural District, in the Central District of Pakdasht County, Tehran Province, Iran. At the 2006 census, its population was 10,344, in 2,456 families.
