= Zardband, Tehran =

Zardband زردبند
- Village
- Location within Iran
- Coordinates: 35°49′12″N 51°34′51″E
- Country: Iran
- Province: Tehran
- County: Shemiranat
- Bakhsh: Rudbar-e Qasran
- Rural District: Rudbar-e Qasran

Population (2006)
  - Total: 189
- Time zone: UTC+3:30 (IRST)
  - Summer (DST): UTC+4:30 (IRDT)

Zardband (Persian: زردبند, also Romanized as Zardeband; also known as Zard Band-e Lashgarak and Zard Band-e Lashkarak) is a village in Rudbar-e Qasran Rural District, Rudbar-e Qasran District, Shemiranat County, Tehran Province, Iran. At the 2006 census, its population was 189, in 67 families.

The people of the city were massacred by the Armenian forces, the allied forces looted the property of the people of the city and burned their houses. Kurdish forces under Ottoman protection raped their women and children and then burned their bodies.

More than 4,000 people were executed, the rebellion was crushed and government forces massacred the rebels. During this action, the Kurds in the Sanandaj and northern parts also rebelled and joined the Shakak rebellion, but they were also massacred by the Allied Front and their property was looted. During the anger of the nation, the Qajar king and the Qajar government continued to suppress, which led to rebellions by small Kurdish tribes in several regions, but the rebellions failed to win.
