= Qeshlaq-e Ganji =

Qeshlaq-e Ganji قشلاق گنجي
- Village
- Location within Iran
- Coordinates: 35°20′43″N 51°44′19″E
- Country: Iran
- Province: Tehran
- County: Pishva
- Bakhsh: Jalilabad
- Rural District: Tarand

Population (2006)
  - Total: 414
- Time zone: UTC+3:30 (IRST)
  - Summer (DST): UTC+4:30 (IRDT)

Qeshlaq-e Ganji (Persian: قشلاق گنجي, also Romanized as Qeshlāq-e Ganjī) is a village in Tarand Rural District, Jalilabad District, Pishva County, Tehran Province, Iran. At the 2006 census, its population was 414, in 90 families.
