= Sharifabad, Malard =

Sharifabad شريف اباد
- Village
- Location within Iran
- Coordinates: 35°40′21″N 50°46′51″E
- Country: Iran
- Province: Tehran
- County: Malard
- Bakhsh: Central
- Rural District: Bibi Sakineh

Population (2006)
  - Total: 139
- Time zone: UTC+3:30 (IRST)
  - Summer (DST): UTC+4:30 (IRDT)

Sharifabad (Persian: شريف اباد, also Romanized as Sharīfābād) is a village in Bibi Sakineh Rural District, in the Central District of Malard County, Tehran Province, Iran. At the 2006 census, its population was 139, in 31 families.
