= Pas Qaleh =

Pas Qaleh پس‌قلعه
- Village
- Location within Iran
- Coordinates: 35°49′52″N 51°25′34″E
- Country: Iran
- Province: Tehran
- County: Shemiranat
- Bakhsh: Rudbar-e Qasran
- Rural District: Rudbar-e Qasran

Population (2006)
  - Total: 153
- Time zone: UTC+3:30 (IRST)
  - Summer (DST): UTC+4:30 (IRDT)

Pas Qaleh (Persian: پس‌قلعه, also Romanized as Pas Qal‘eh and Pas Qalleh; also known as Past Qal‘eh) is a village in Rudbar-e Qasran Rural District, Rudbar-e Qasran District, Shemiranat County, Tehran Province, Iran. At the 2006 census, its population was 153, in 47 families.
