= Javadabad, Varamin =

City in Tehran province, Iran

Javadabad Persian: جوادآباد
- City
- Location within Iran
- Coordinates: 35°12′40″N 51°40′27″E
- Country: Iran
- Province: Tehran
- County: Varamin
- District: Javadabad

Population (2016)
  - Total: 4,844
- Time zone: UTC+3:30 (IRST)

Javadabad (Persian: جوادآباد (Note: Also romanized as Javādābād and Jawādābād)) is a city in, and the capital of, Javadabad District in Varamin County, Tehran province, Iran. It also serves as the administrative center for Behnamarab-e Jonubi Rural District.

== Demographics ==
=== Population ===
At the time of the 2006 National Census, the city's population was 4,718, living in 1,103 households. The following census in 2011 recorded 4,903 people in 1,220 households. The 2016 census measured the city's population as 4,844 people in 1,494 households.
