= Kamar Khani =

Kamar Khani كمرخاني
- Village
- Location within Iran
- Coordinates: 35°52′01″N 51°33′09″E
- Country: Iran
- Province: Tehran
- County: Shemiranat
- Bakhsh: Rudbar-e Qasran
- Rural District: Rudbar-e Qasran

Population (2006)
  - Total: 44
- Time zone: UTC+3:30 (IRST)
  - Summer (DST): UTC+4:30 (IRDT)

Kamar Khani (Persian: كمرخاني, also Romanized as Kamar Khānī; also known as Kalūgān) is a village in the Rudbar-e Qasran Rural District, Rudbar-e Qasran District, Shemiranat County, Tehran Province, Iran. According to the 2006 census, the village had a population of 44, comprising 13 families.
