= Shatar Mohammad-e Sofla =

Shatar Mohammad-e Sofla شاطرمحمد سفلی
- Village
- Interactive map of Shatar Mohammad-e Sofla
- Coordinates: 35.706°N 51.949°E
- Country: Iran
- Province: Tehran
- County: Damavand
- Bakhsh: Rudehen
- Rural District: Mehrabad

Population (2006)
  - Total: 13
- Time zone: UTC+3:30 (IRST)

Shatar Mohammad-e Sofla (Persian: شاطرمحمد سفلی, also Romanized as Shāṭar Moḥammad-e Soflá) is a village in Mehrabad Rural District, Rudehen District, Damavand County, Tehran Province, Iran. At the 2006 census, its population was 13, in 4 families. The village had less than 4 households in 2011 and 2016 census results.
