= Safayieh =

Safayieh صفاييه
- Village
- Country: Iran
- Province: Tehran
- County: Pakdasht
- Bakhsh: Sharifabad
- Rural District: Karimabad

Population (2006)
  - Total: 90
- Time zone: UTC+3:30 (IRST)
  - Summer (DST): UTC+4:30 (IRDT)

Safayieh (Persian: صفاييه, also Romanized as Safāyīeh) is a village in Karimabad Rural District, Sharifabad District, Pakdasht County, Tehran Province, Iran. At the 2006 census, its population was 90, in 18 families.
