= Dagh Qui =

Dagh Qui داغ قوئي
- village
- Location within Iran
- Coordinates: 35°39′14″N 50°30′14″E
- Country: Iran
- Province: Tehran
- County: Malard
- Bakhsh: Central
- Rural District: Akhtarabad

Population (2006)
  - Total: 11
- Time zone: UTC+3:30 (IRST)
  - Summer (DST): UTC+4:30 (IRDT)

Dagh Qui (Persian: داغ قوئي, also Romanized as Dāgh Qū’ī) is a village in Akhtarabad Rural District, in the Central District of Malard County, Tehran province, Iran. At the 2006 census, its population was 11, in 6 families.
