= Shahr-e Jadid-e Parand =

Shahr-e Jadid-e Parand شهرجديدپرند
- Village
- Location within Iran
- Coordinates: 35°26′50″N 50°59′12″E
- Country: Iran
- Province: Tehran
- County: Robat Karim
- Bakhsh: Central
- Rural District: Manjilabad

Population (2006)
  - Total: 5,791
- Time zone: UTC+3:30 (IRST)
  - Summer (DST): UTC+4:30 (IRDT)

Shahr-e Jadid-e Parand (Persian: شهرجديدپرند, also Romanized as Shahr-e Jadīd-e Parand) is a village in Manjilabad Rural District, in the Central District of Robat Karim County, Tehran Province, Iran. At the 2006 census, its population was 5,791, in 1,603 families.
