= Salmian =

Salmian سلميان
- village
- Location within Iran
- Coordinates: 35°42′08″N 50°49′49″E
- Country: Iran
- Province: Tehran
- County: Malard
- Bakhsh: Central
- Rural District: Bibi Sakineh

Population (2006)
  - Total: 136
- Time zone: UTC+3:30 (IRST)
  - Summer (DST): UTC+4:30 (IRDT)

Salmian (Persian: سلميان, also Romanized as Salmīān; also known as Soleymānābād) is a village in Bibi Sakineh Rural District, in the Central District of Malard County, Tehran Province, Iran. At the 2006 census, its population was 136, in 36 families.
