= Mandanak =

Mandanak مندانك
- village
- Location within Iran
- Coordinates: 35°45′18″N 51°55′04″E
- Country: Iran
- Province: Tehran
- County: Damavand
- Bakhsh: Rudehen
- Rural District: Abali
- Elevation: 1,940 m (6,360 ft)

Population (2016)
  - Total: 31
- Time zone: UTC+3:30 (IRST)

Mandanak (Persian: مندانك, also Romanized as Mandānak) is a village in Abali Rural District, Rudehen District, Damavand County, Tehran Province, Iran.

At the time of the 2006 National Census, the village's population was 53 in 16 households. The following census in 2011 counted 31 people in 9 households. The 2016 census showed the population of the village was less than 4 households.
