= Qaleh-ye Seyyed, Tehran =

Qaleh-ye Seyyed قلعه سيد
- Village
- Country: Iran
- Province: Tehran
- County: Rey
- Bakhsh: Kahrizak
- Rural District: Kahrizak

Population (2006)
  - Total: 307
- Time zone: UTC+3:30 (IRST)
  - Summer (DST): UTC+4:30 (IRDT)

Qaleh-ye Seyyed (Persian: قلعه سيد, also Romanized as Qal‘eh-ye Seyyed) is a village in Kahrizak Rural District, Kahrizak District, Ray County, Tehran Province, Iran. At the 2006 census, its population was 307, in 68 families.
