= Qasemabad-e Qanat Shur =

Qasemabad-e Qanat Shur قاسم ابادقنات شور
- Village
- Location within Iran
- Coordinates: 35°27′00″N 51°24′00″E
- Country: Iran
- Province: Tehran
- County: Rey
- Bakhsh: Kahrizak
- Rural District: Kahrizak

Population (2006)
  - Total: 43
- Time zone: UTC+3:30 (IRST)
  - Summer (DST): UTC+4:30 (IRDT)

Qasemabad-e Qanat Shur (Persian: قاسم ابادقنات شور, also Romanized as Qāsemābād-e Qanāt Shūr; also known as Qāsemābād) is a village in Kahrizak Rural District, Kahrizak District, Ray County, Tehran Province, Iran. At the 2006 census, its population was 43, in 11 families.
