= Haddadiyeh =

Haddadiyeh حداديه
- Village
- Location within Iran
- Coordinates: 35°48′56″N 51°32′06″E
- Country: Iran
- Province: Tehran
- County: Shemiranat
- Bakhsh: Rudbar-e Qasran
- Rural District: Rudbar-e Qasran

Population (2006)
  - Total: 15
- Time zone: UTC+3:30 (IRST)
  - Summer (DST): UTC+4:30 (IRDT)

Haddadiyeh (Persian: حداديه, also Romanized as Ḩaddādīyeh, Haddādīyeh, and Haddādīyyeh) is a village in Rudbar-e Qasran Rural District, Rudbar-e Qasran District, Shemiranat County, Tehran Province, Iran. At the 2006 census, its population was 15, in 6 families.
