= Mahmudabad, Firuzkuh =

Mahmudabad محمودآباد
- village
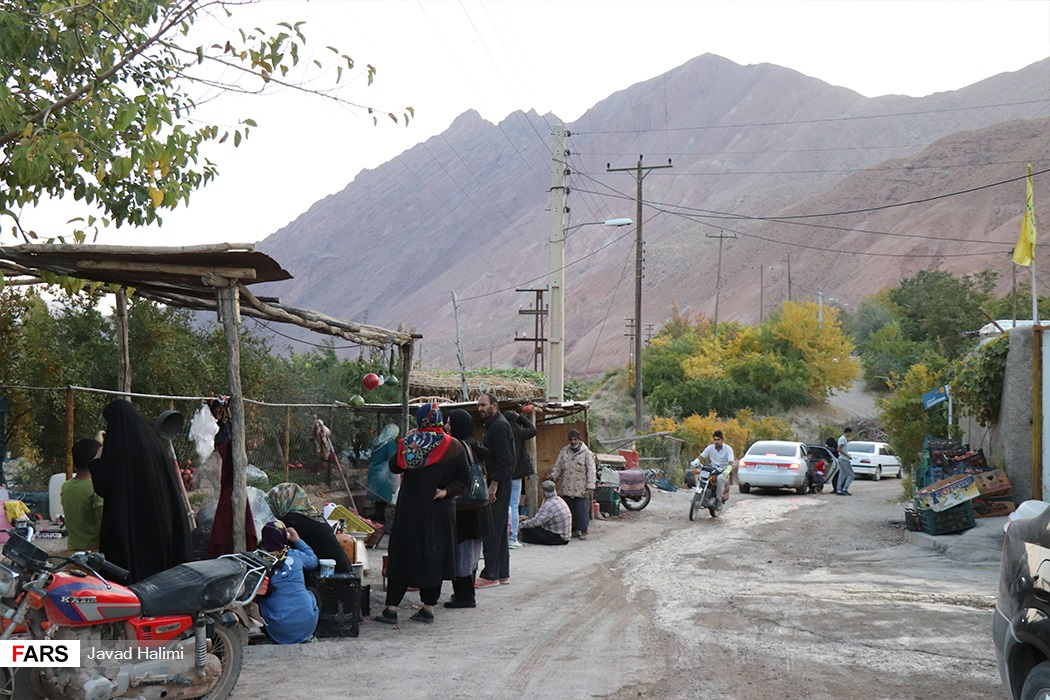
- Mahmudabad

- Location within Iran
- Coordinates: 35°29′12″N 52°26′31″E
- Country: Iran
- Province: Tehran
- County: Firuzkuh
- Bakhsh: Central
- Rural District: Hablerud
- Elevation: 1,350 m (4,430 ft)

Population (2016)
  - Total: 160
- Time zone: UTC+3:30 (IRST)

Mahmudabad (Persian: محمودآباد, also Romanized as Maḩmūdābād) is a village in Hablerud Rural District, in the Central District of Firuzkuh County, Tehran Province, Iran. The people of this village are mostly gardeners. This village is pomegranate pole of Tehran Province.

At the time of the 2006 National Census, the village's population was 307 in 91 households. The following census in 2011 counted 220 people in 77 households. The 2016 census measured the population of the village as 160 people in 61 households.
