= Kajan, Tehran =

Kajan كاجان
- Village
- Location within Iran
- Coordinates: 35°37′52″N 51°58′36″E
- Country: Iran
- Province: Tehran
- County: Damavand
- Bakhsh: Central
- Rural District: Tarrud

Population (2016)
  - Total: 51
- Time zone: UTC+3:30 (IRST)

Kajan (Persian: كاجان, also Romanized as Kājān) is a village in Tarrud Rural District, in the Central District of Damavand County, Tehran Province, Iran. At the 2016 census, its population was 51, in 25 families. Down from 72 in 2006.
