= Shamsabad, Ray =

Village in Tehran province, Iran

Shamsabad Persian: شمس اباد
- Village
- Location within Iran
- Country: Iran
- Province: Tehran
- County: Ray
- District: Qaleh Now
- Rural District: Qaleh Now

Population (2016)
  - Total: 0
- Time zone: UTC+3:30 (IRST)

Shamsabad (Persian: شمس اباد) (Note: Also romanized as Shamsābād) is a village in Qaleh Now Rural District of Qaleh Now District in Ray County, Tehran province, Iran.

== Demographics ==
=== Population ===
At the time of the 2006 National Census, the village's population was 29 in 12 households, when it was in Kahrizak District. The village did not appear in the following census of 2011. The 2016 census measured the population of the village as zero, by which time the rural district had been separated from the district in the formation of Qaleh Now District.
