= Shamsabad, Fashapuyeh =

Village in Tehran province, Iran

Shamsabad Persian: شمس اباد
- Village
- Location within Iran
- Coordinates: 35°20′14″N 51°13′58″E
- Country: Iran
- Province: Tehran
- County: Ray
- District: Fashapuyeh
- Rural District: Hasanabad

Population (2016)
  - Total: 1,464
- Time zone: UTC+3:30 (IRST)

Shamsabad (Persian: شمس اباد) (Note: Also romanized as Shamsābād) is a village in Hasanabad Rural District of Fashapuyeh District in Ray County, Tehran province, Iran.

== Demographics ==
=== Population ===
At the time of the 2006 National Census, the village's population was 2,278 in 717 households. The following census in 2011 counted 2,624 people in 959 households. The 2016 census measured the population of the village as 1,464 people in 546 households. It was the most populous village in its rural district.
