= Behnamarab-e Jonubi Rural District =

Rural district in Tehran province, Iran

Behnamarab-e Jonubi Rural District Persian: دهستان بهنام عرب جنوبي
- Rural District
- Location within Iran
- Coordinates: 35°05′N 51°45′E
- Country: Iran
- Province: Tehran
- County: Varamin
- District: Javadabad
- Established: 1987
- Capital: Javadabad

Population (2016)
  - Total: 13,476
- Time zone: UTC+3:30 (IRST)

Behnamarab-e Jonubi Rural District (Persian: دهستان بهنام عرب جنوبي) is in Javadabad District of Varamin County, Tehran province, Iran. It is administered from the city of Javadabad.

== Demographics ==
=== Population ===
At the time of the 2006 National Census, the rural district's population was 15,235 in 3,843 households. There were 13,394 inhabitants in 3,750 households at the following census of 2011. The 2016 census measured the population of the rural district as 13,476 in 4,006 households. The most populous of its 92 villages was Mohammadabad-e Arab, with 1,965 people.

=== Other villages in the rural district ===
- Hesar-e Bala
- Hesar-e Hasan Beyk
- Hesar-e Qazi
- Jafarabad-e Jangal
- Khaveh
- Qaleh Boland
- Qaleh Khvajeh
- Rostamabad
- Salmanabad
- Toghan
- Zavareh Var
