= Javadabad District =

District in Tehran province, Iran

Javadabad District Persian: بخش جوادآباد
- District
- Location within Iran
- Coordinates: 35°07′N 51°45′E
- Country: Iran
- Province: Tehran
- County: Varamin
- Capital: Javadabad

Population (2016)
  - Total: 24,975
- Time zone: UTC+3:30 (IRST)

Javadabad District (Persian: بخش جوادآباد) is in Varamin County, Tehran province, Iran. Its capital is the city of Javadabad.

== Demographics ==
=== Population ===
At the time of the 2006 National Census, the district's population was 26,105 in 6,410 households. The following census in 2011 counted 24,280 people in 6,571 households. The 2016 census measured the population of the district as 24,975 inhabitants in 7,443 households.

=== Administrative divisions ===
Javadabad District Population
Administrative Divisions	2006	2011	2016
Behnamarab-e Jonubi RD	15,235	13,394	13,476
Behnamvasat-e Jonubi RD	6,152	5,983	6,655
Javadabad (city)	4,718	4,903	4,844
Total	26,105	24,280	24,975
RD = Rural District
