= Varamin County =

County in Tehran province, Iran

Varamin County Persian: شهرستان ورامین
- County
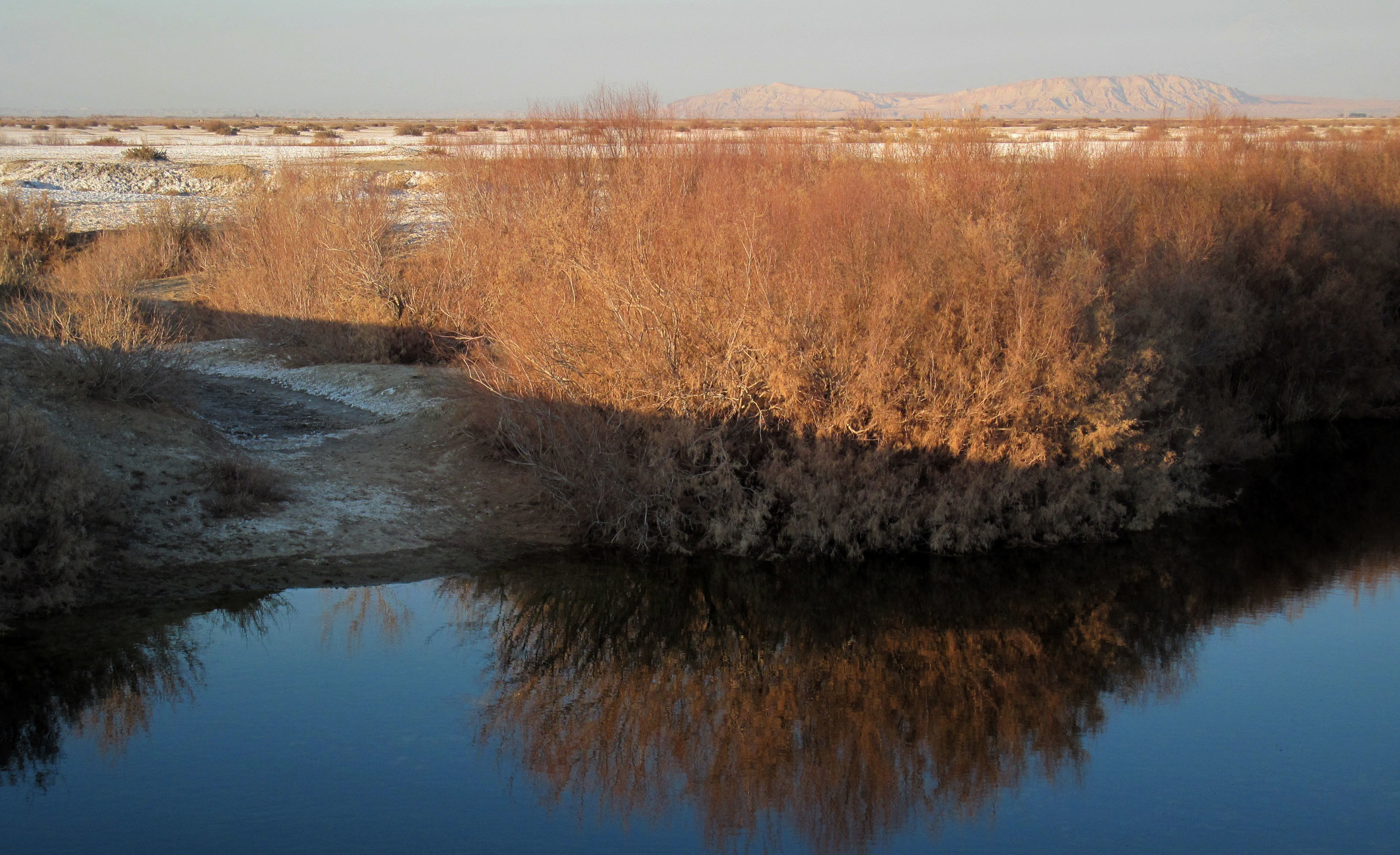
- Landscape in Varamin County

- Location of Varamin County in Tehran province (bottom, pink)

- Location of Tehran province in Iran
- Coordinates: 35°09′N 51°46′E
- Country: Iran
- Province: Tehran
- Capital: Varamin
- Districts: Central, Javadabad

Population (2016)
  - Total: 283,742
- Time zone: UTC+3:30 (IRST)

Varamin County (Persian: شهرستان ورامین) is in Tehran province, Iran. Its capital is the city of Varamin.

== History ==
Pishva District was separated from the county in the establishment of Pishva County in 2010. Qarchak District was separated from the county to establish Qarchak County in 2012.

== Demographics ==
=== Population ===
At the time of the 2006 National Census, the county's population was 540,442 in 134,538 households. The following census in 2011 counted 526,294 people in 140,183 households. The 2016 census measured the population of the county as 283,742 in 85,516 households.

=== Administrative divisions ===
Varamin County's population history and administrative structure over three consecutive censuses are shown in the following table.

Varamin County Population
Administrative Divisions	2006	2011	2016
Central District	232,393	271,738	258,752
Behnampazuki-ye Jonubi RD	12,940	41,609	21,638
Behnamvasat-e Shomali RD	10,884	11,138	11,486
Varamin (city)	208,569	218,991	225,628
Javadabad District	26,105	24,280	24,975
Behnamarab-e Jonubi RD	15,235	13,394	13,476
Behnamvasat-e Jonubi RD	6,152	5,983	6,655
Javadabad (city)	4,718	4,903	4,844
Pishva District (Note: Transferred to Pishva County)	69,995		
Asgariyeh RD	14,364		
Behnamsokhteh-e Jonubi RD (Note: Renamed Jalilabad Rural District)	14,151		
Pishva (city)	41,480		
Qarchak District (Note: Transferred to Qarchak County)	211,949	230,262	
Qeshlaq-e Jitu RD	10,687	10,726	
Valiabad RD	27,430	27,948	
Qarchak (city)	173,832	191,588	
Total	540,442	526,294	283,742
RD = Rural District

==== Landmarks ====
A tomb known as Shah Hoseyn was also built in Ilkhanid era. Portal of Masjid-i Sharif, which does not exist nowadays is mentioned to be completed in 1307. An Ilkhanid graveyard was unearthed in 2016.

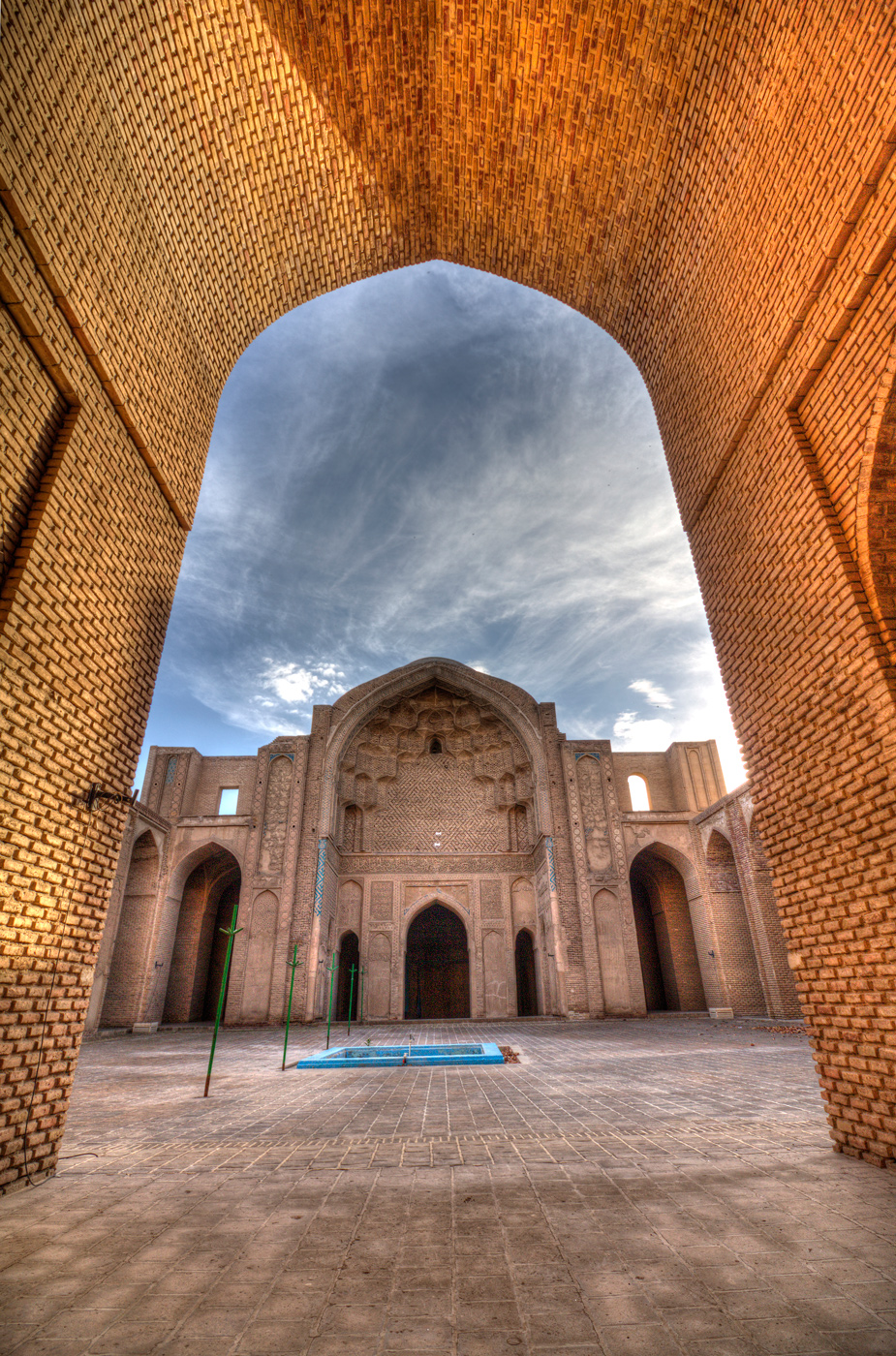
Jameh Mosque of Varamin

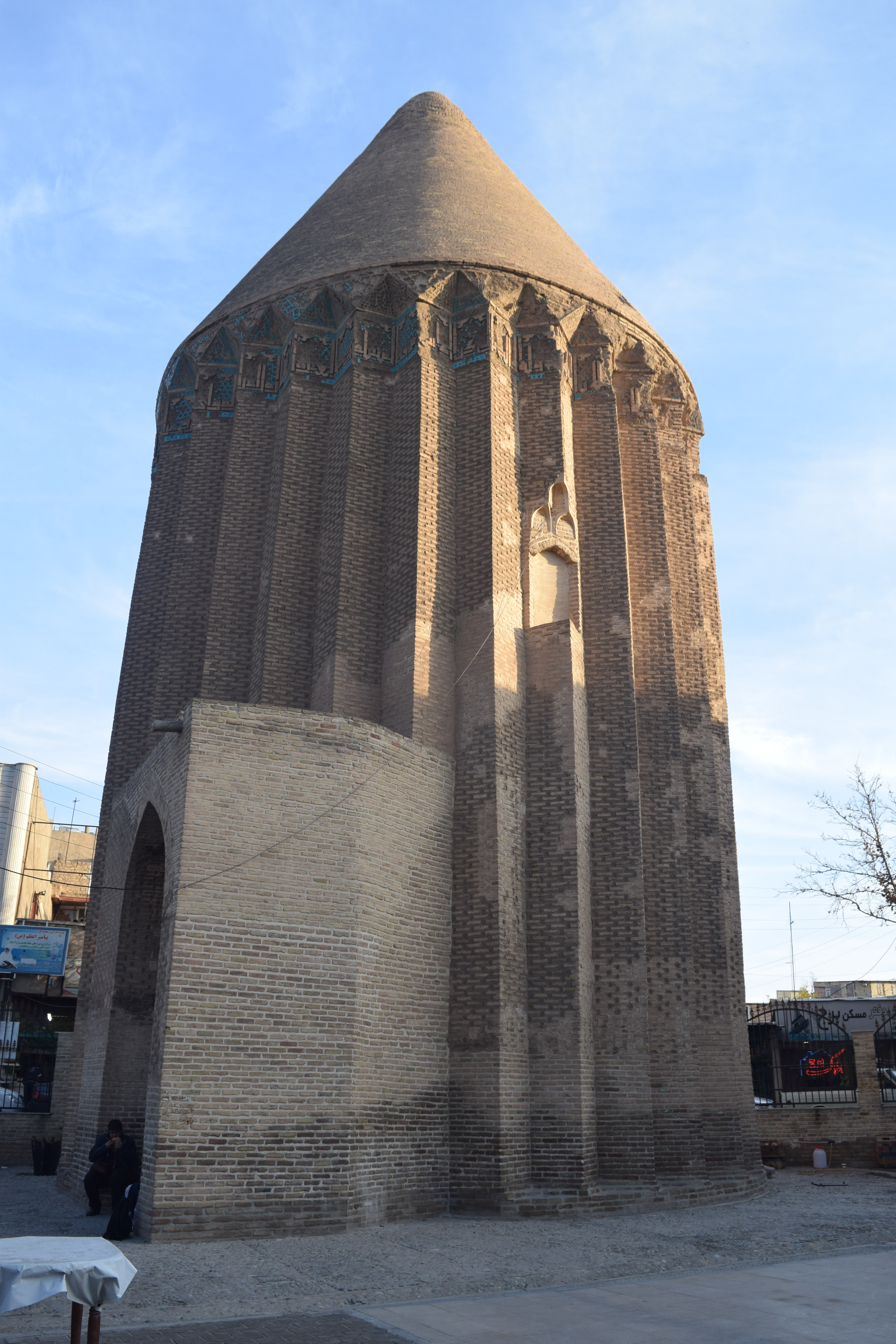
Aladdin Tower

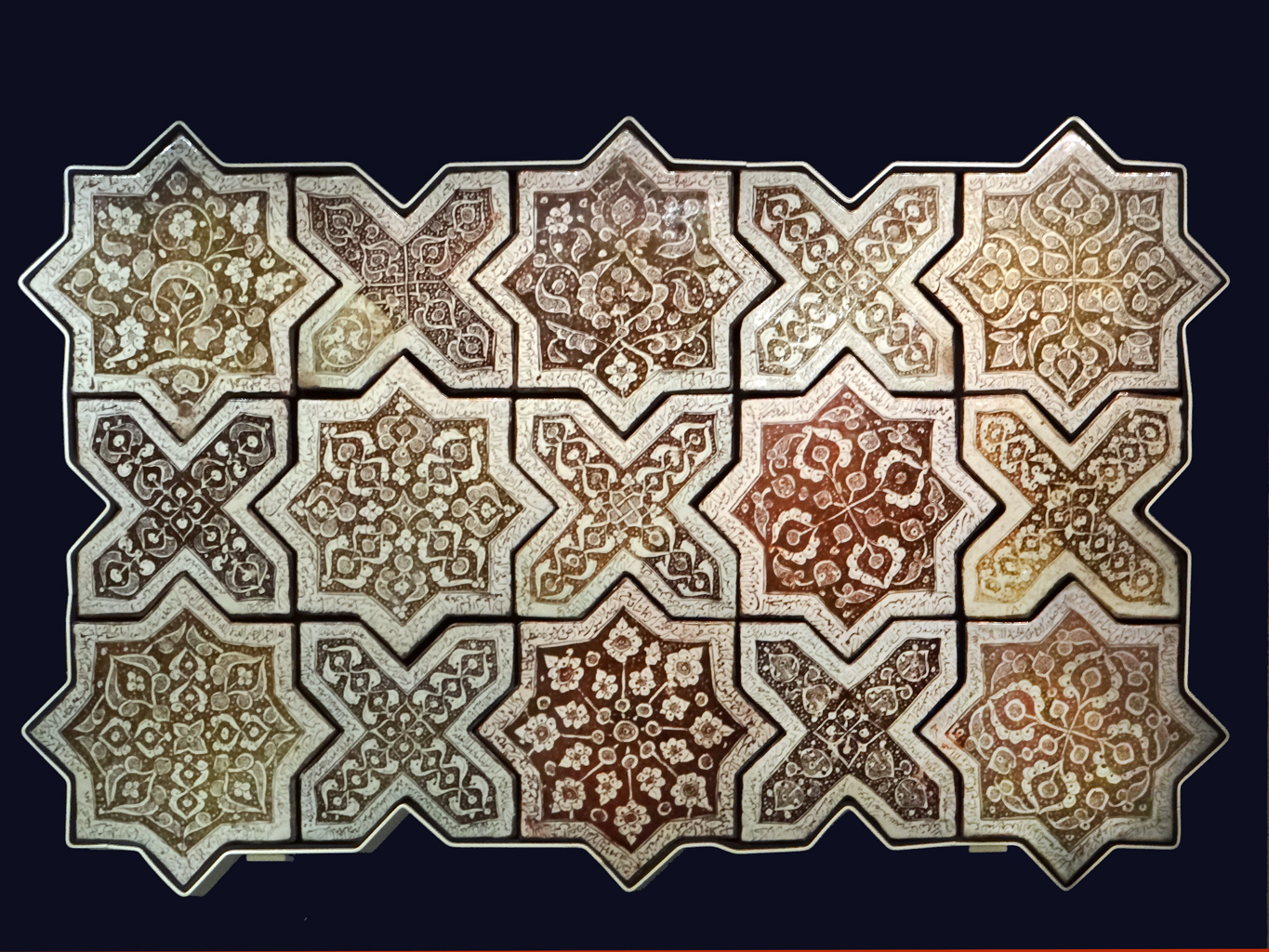
A set of tiles from Imamzadeh Yahya

== See also ==
Media related to Varamin County at Wikimedia Commons
