= Qaleh Now =

Qaleh Now or Qaleh-ye Now or Qaleh Nau or Qaleh-i-Nau (Persian: قلعه نو; English: New Castle), also rendered as Qalehno, may refer to:

== Afghanistan ==
- Qal`eh-ye Now, a village in Afghanistan

== Iran ==
=== Fars Province ===
- Qaleh Now, Darab, a village in Darab County
- Qaleh Now, Hashivar, a village in Darab County
- Qaleh Now, Kavar, a village in Kavar County
- Qaleh-ye Now-e Mozaffari, a village in Kavar County
- Qaleh Now, Kharameh, a village in Kharameh County
- Qaleh Now, Mamasani, a village in Mamasani County
- Qaleh-ye Now, Marvdasht, a village in Marvdasht County
- Qaleh Now, Kamfiruz, a village in Marvdasht County
- Qaleh Now, Sepidan, a village in Sepidan County
- Qaleh Now, Bid Zard, a village in Shiraz County
- Qaleh-i-Nau, Derak, a village in Shiraz County
- Qaleh Now, Kaftarak, a village in Shiraz County

=== Hamadan Province ===
- Qaleh Now, Malayer, a village in Malayer County
- Qaleh Now, Tuyserkan, a village in Tuyserkan County

=== Hormozgan Province ===
- Qaleh Now, Hormozgan, a village in Hajjiabad County

=== Isfahan Province ===
- Qaleh Now, Isfahan, a village in Lenjan County

=== Kerman Province ===
- Qaleh Now, Arzuiyeh, a village in Arzuiyeh County
- Qaleh Now, Bam, a village in Bam County
- Qaleh-ye Now, Jiroft, a village in Jiroft County
- Qaleh Now, Jebalbarez, a village in Jiroft County

=== Khuzestan Province ===
- Qaleh Now-e Khalil, a village in Dezful County
- Qaleh Now Shamsabad, a village in Dezful County
- Qaleh Now, Omidiyeh, a village in Omidiyeh County

=== Lorestan Province ===
- Qaleh Now, Lorestan, a village in Khorramabad County
- Qaleh Now-ye Hakim, a village in Borujerd County
- Qaleh Now-ye Showkati, a village in Borujerd County

=== Markazi Province ===
- Qaleh-ye Now, Arak, a village in Arak County
- Qaleh Now, Khomeyn, a village in Khomeyn County
- Qaleh Now, alternate name of Hajjiabad, Khomeyn, a village in Khomeyn County
- Qaleh Now, Shazand, a village in Shazand County
- Qaleh Now, alternate name of Gunestan, a village in Shazand County

=== North Khorasan Province ===
- Qaleh Now-ye Anqolabi, a village in Esfarayen County
- Qaleh Now, Maneh and Samalqan, a village in Maneh and Samalqan County

=== Razavi Khorasan Province ===
- Qaleh Now-e Shamlu, a village in Bakharz County
- Qaleh Now, Chenaran, a village in Chenaran County
- Qaleh Now-e Kahu, a village in Chenaran County
- Qaleh Now-ye Fariman, a village in Fariman County
- Qaleh-ye Now, Joghatai, a village in Joghatai County
- Qaleh-ye Now, Jowayin, a village in Jowayin County
- Qaleh Now, Kalat, a village in Kalat County
- Qaleh-ye Now, Khvaf, a village in Khvaf County
- Qaleh Now, Mahvelat, a village in Mahvelat County
- Qaleh Now-e Kalateh Menar, a village in Mashhad County
- Qaleh Now-e Valiabad, a village in Mashhad County
- Qaleh Now, Nishapur, a village in Nishapur County
- Qaleh Now, alternate name of Gardan, a village in Nishapur County
- Qaleh Now-ye Alireza Bek, a village in Nishapur County
- Qaleh Now-e Jamshid, a village in Nishapur County
- Qaleh Now-ye Mehdiabad, a village in Nishapur County
- Qaleh Now-e Naimabad, a village in Nishapur County
- Qaleh Now, Sarakhs, a village in Sarakhs County
- Qaleh Now-e Abgheh, a village in Taybad County
- Qaleh Now, Torbat-e Heydarieh, a village in Torbat-e Heydarieh County
- Qaleh Now-e Mastufi, a village in Torbat-e Heydarieh County
- Qaleh Now-ye Safiabad, a village in Zaveh County

=== Semnan Province ===
- Qaleh Now-e Kharaqan, a village in Shahrud County
- Qaleh Now-e Khaleseh, Semnan, a village in Shahrud County

=== Sistan and Baluchestan Province ===
- Qaleh Now, Zehak, a village in Zehak County
- Qaleh Now Rural District (Zehak County)

=== South Khorasan Province ===
- Qaleh Now, South Khorasan, a village in Darmian County

=== Tehran Province ===
- Qaleh Now-e Amlak, a village in Pakdasht County
- Qaleh Now, Pishva, a village in Pishva County
- Qaleh Now, Shahriar, a village in Shahriar County
- Qaleh Now, Varamin, a village in Varamin County
- Qaleh-ye Now-e Fashapuyeh, a village in Ray County
- Qaleh-ye Now Chaman Zamin, a village in Ray County
- Qaleh Now-e Hajji Musa, a village in Tehran County
- Qaleh Now-e Khaleseh, Tehran, a village in Tehran County
- Qaleh Now Rural District (Ray County)
