= Azimabad (disambiguation) =

Azimabad is the former name of Patna, India.

Azimabad (Persian: عظيم اباد) may also refer to:

- Azimabad, Ardabil
- Azimabad, Kermanshah
- Azimabad, Mazandaran
- Azimabad, Razavi Khorasan
- Azimabad, Tehran
- Qaleh-ye Azimabad, Tehran Province
- Azimabad, Yazd

== See also ==
- Shad Azimabadi, Indian Urdu poet
- Bismil Azimabadi, Indian Urdu poet
- Muhammad Shams-ul-Haq Azimabadi, Indian Islamic scholar
