= Hamidabad, Tehran =

Village in Tehran province, Iran

Hamidabad Persian: حميداباد
- Village
- Location within Iran
- Coordinates: 35°26′41″N 51°32′07″E
- Country: Iran
- Province: Tehran
- County: Ray
- District: Qaleh Now
- Rural District: Chaleh Tarkhan

Population (2016)
  - Total: 157
- Time zone: UTC+3:30 (IRST)

Hamidabad (Persian: حميداباد) (Note: Also romanized as Ḩamīdābād) is a village in Chaleh Tarkhan Rural District of Qaleh Now District in Ray County, Tehran province, Iran.

== Demographics ==
=== Population ===
At the time of the 2006 National Census, the village's population was 155 in 43 households, when it was in Qaleh Now Rural District of Kahrizak District. The following census in 2011 counted nine people in four households. The 2016 census measured the population of the village as 157 people in 59 households, by which time the rural district had been separated from the district in the formation of Qaleh Now District. Hamidabad was transferred to Chaleh Tarkhan Rural District created in the new district.
