= Abbasabad-e Alaqband =

Village in Tehran province, Iran

Abbasabad-e Alaqband Persian: عباس ابادعلاقبند
- Village
- Location within Iran
- Coordinates: 35°31′38″N 51°34′47″E
- Country: Iran
- Province: Tehran
- County: Ray
- District: Khavaran
- Rural District: Khavaran-e Gharbi

Population (2016)
  - Total: 2,201
- Time zone: UTC+3:30 (IRST)

Abbasabad-e Alaqband (Persian: عباس ابادعلاقبند) (Note: Also romanized as Abbāsābād-e ‘Alāqband; also known as ‘Abbāsābād) is a village in Khavaran-e Gharbi Rural District of Khavaran District in Ray County, Tehran province, Iran.

== Demographics ==
=== Population ===
At the time of the 2006 National Census, the village's population was 1,886 in 456 households, when it was in Qaleh Now Rural District of Kahrizak District. The following census in 2011 counted 2,717 people in 710 households, by which time villages had been separated from the district in the formation of Khavaran District. Abbasabad-e Alaqband was transferred to Khavaran-e Gharbi Rural District created in the new district. The 2016 census measured the population of the village as 2,201 people in 668 households.
