= Qomiabad =

Village in Tehran province, Iran

Qomiabad Persian: قمي اباد
- Village
- Location within Iran
- Coordinates: 35°29′33″N 51°31′05″E
- Country: Iran
- Province: Tehran
- County: Ray
- District: Qaleh Now
- Rural District: Chaleh Tarkhan

Population (2016)
  - Total: 823
- Time zone: UTC+3:30 (IRST)

Qomiabad (Persian: قمي اباد) (Note: Also romanized as Qamīābād and Qomīābād) is a village in Chaleh Tarkhan Rural District of Qaleh Now District in Ray County, Tehran province, Iran.

== Demographics ==
=== Population ===
At the time of the 2006 National Census, the village's population was 732 in 185 households, when it was in Qaleh Now Rural District of Kahrizak District. The following census in 2011 counted 815 people in 233 households. The 2016 census measured the population of the village as 823 people in 252 households, by which time the rural district had been separated from the district in the formation of Qaleh Now District. Qomiabad was transferred to Chaleh Tarkhan Rural District created in the new district.
