= Nazarabad, Ray =

Village in Tehran province, Iran

Nazarabad Persian: نظراباد
- Village
- Location within Iran
- Coordinates: 35°28′26″N 51°27′53″E
- Country: Iran
- Province: Tehran
- County: Ray
- District: Qaleh Now
- Rural District: Chaleh Tarkhan

Population (2016)
  - Total: 9
- Time zone: UTC+3:30 (IRST)

Nazarabad (Persian: نظراباد) (Note: Also romanized as Naz̧arābād) is a village in Chaleh Tarkhan Rural District of Qaleh Now District in Ray County, Tehran province, Iran.

== Demographics ==
=== Population ===
At the time of the 2006 National Census, the village's population was 16 in four households, when it was in Qaleh Now Rural District of Kahrizak District. The following census in 2011 counted 16 people in seven households. The 2016 census measured the population of the village as nine people in five households, by which time the rural district had been separated from the district in the formation of Qaleh Now District. Nazarabad was transferred to Chaleh Tarkhan Rural District created in the new district.
