= Najmabad, Tehran =

Village in Tehran province, Iran

Najmabad Persian: نجم آباد
- Village
- Location within Iran
- Coordinates: 35°30′01″N 51°27′30″E
- Country: Iran
- Province: Tehran
- County: Ray
- District: Qaleh Now
- Rural District: Chaleh Tarkhan

Population (2016)
  - Total: 2,249
- Time zone: UTC+3:30 (IRST)

Najmabad (Persian: نجم آباد) (Note: Also romanized as Najmābād) is a village in Chaleh Tarkhan Rural District of Qaleh Now District in Ray County, Tehran province, Iran.

== Demographics ==
=== Population ===
At the time of the 2006 National Census, the village's population was 336 in 86 households, when it was in Qaleh Now Rural District of Kahrizak District. The following census in 2011 counted 389 people in 92 households. The 2016 census measured the population of the village as 356 people in 105 households, by which time the rural district had been separated from the district in the formation of Qaleh Now District. Najmabad was transferred to Chaleh Tarkhan Rural District created in the new district.
