= Chaleh Tarkhan =

Village in Tehran province, Iran

Chaleh Tarkhan Persian: چاله طرخان
- Village
- Location within Iran
- Coordinates: 35°29′55″N 51°28′38″E
- Country: Iran
- Province: Tehran
- County: Ray
- District: Qaleh Now
- Rural District: Chaleh Tarkhan

Population (2016)
  - Total: 601
- Time zone: UTC+3:30 (IRST)

Chaleh Tarkhan (Persian: چاله طرخان) (Note: Also romanized as Chāleh Ţarkhān; also known as Chāh Ţarkhān and Chāl Ţarkhān) is a village in, and the capital of, Chaleh Tarkhan Rural District in Qaleh Now District of Ray County, Tehran province, Iran.

== Demographics ==
=== Population ===
At the time of the 2006 National Census, the village's population was 658 in 172 households, when it was in Qaleh Now Rural District of Kahrizak District. The following census in 2011 counted 696 people in 195 households. The 2016 census measured the population of the village as 601 people in 180 households, by which time the rural district had been separated from the district in the formation of Qaleh Now District. Chaleh Tarkhan was transferred to Chaleh Tarkhan Rural District created in the new district.

== History ==
Stucco wall decorations, dating from the Sassanid Empire, are preserved at Chaleh Tarkhan. In the late 1930s, Erich Schmidt of the University of Pennsylvania's Penn Museum, in collaboration with the Boston Museum of Fine Arts, led an expedition that excavated Chaleh Tarkhan.
