= Tutak, Tehran =

Village in Tehran province, Iran

Tutak Persian: توتک
- Village
- Location within Iran
- Coordinates: 35°34′23″N 51°37′04″E
- Country: Iran
- Province: Tehran
- County: Ray
- District: Khavaran
- Rural District: Khavaran-e Sharqi

Population (2016)
  - Total: 262
- Time zone: UTC+3:30 (IRST)

Tutak (Persian: توتک) (Note: Also romanized as Tūtak) is a village in Khavaran-e Sharqi Rural District of Khavaran District in Ray County, Tehran province, Iran.

== Demographics ==
=== Population ===
At the time of the 2006 National Census, the village's population was 161 in 38 households, when it was in Ghaniabad Rural District of the Central District. The following census in 2011 counted 114 people in 35 households, by which time the village had been separated from the district in the formation of Khavaran District. Tutak was transferred to Khavaran-e Sharqi Rural District created in the new district. The 2016 census measured the population of the village as 262 people in 82 households.
