= Firuzabad, Tehran =

Village in Tehran province, Iran

Firuzabad Persian: فيروزاباد
- Village
- Location within Iran
- Coordinates: 35°32′35″N 51°28′56″E
- Country: Iran
- Province: Tehran
- County: Ray
- District: Qaleh Now
- Rural District: Chaleh Tarkhan

Population (2016)
  - Total: 8,756
- Time zone: UTC+3:30 (IRST)

Firuzabad (Persian: فيروزاباد) (Note: Also romanized as Fīrūzābād) is a village in Chaleh Tarkhan Rural District of Qaleh Now District in Ray County, Tehran province, Iran.

== Demographics ==
=== Population ===
At the time of the 2006 National Census, the village's population was 8,579 in 2,106 households, when it was in Qaleh Now Rural District of Kahrizak District. The following census in 2011 counted 8,699 people in 2,416 households. The 2016 census measured the population of the village as 8,756 people in 2,510 households, by which time the rural district had been separated from the district in the formation of Qaleh Now District. Firuzabad was transferred to Chaleh Tarkhan Rural District created in the new district. It was the most populous village in its rural district.
