= Lappeh Zanak =

Village in Tehran province, Iran

Lappeh Zanak Persian: لپه زنك
- Village
- Location within Iran
- Coordinates: 35°34′18″N 51°35′38″E
- Country: Iran
- Province: Tehran
- County: Ray
- District: Khavaran
- Rural District: Khavaran-e Gharbi

Population (2016)
  - Total: 513
- Time zone: UTC+3:30 (IRST)

Mahmudabad (Persian: محموداباد) (Note: Also romanized as Maḩmūdābād) is a village in Khavaran-e Gharbi Rural District of Khavaran District in Ray County, Tehran province, Iran.

== Demographics ==
=== Population ===
At the time of the 2006 National Census, the village's population was 628 in 201 households, when it was in Ghaniabad Rural District of the Central District. The following census in 2011 counted 297 people in 104 households, by which time the village had been separated from the district in the formation of Khavaran District. Lappeh Zanak was transferred to Khavaran-e Gharbi Rural District created in the new district. The 2016 census measured the population of the village as 513 people in 174 households.
