= Eshqabad, Tehran =

Village in Tehran province, Iran

Eshqabad Persian: عشق اباد
- Village
- Location within Iran
- Coordinates: 35°27′18″N 51°30′09″E
- Country: Iran
- Province: Tehran
- County: Ray
- District: Qaleh Now
- Rural District: Chaleh Tarkhan

Population (2016)
  - Total: 1,191
- Time zone: UTC+3:30 (IRST)

Eshqabad (Persian: عشق اباد) (Note: Also romanized as ‘Eshqābād; also known as Ba‘eshqābād and Ba‘ishqābād) is a village in Chaleh Tarkhan Rural District of Qaleh Now District in Ray County, Tehran province, Iran.

== Demographics ==
=== Population ===
At the time of the 2006 National Census, the village's population was 917 in 216 households, when it was in Qaleh Now Rural District of Kahrizak District. The following census in 2011 counted 1,230 people in 333 households. The 2016 census measured the population of the village as 1,191 people in 361 households, by which time the rural district had been separated from the district in the formation of Qaleh Now District. Eshqabad was transferred to Chaleh Tarkhan Rural District created in the new district.
