= Qasemabad-e Tehranchi =

Village in Tehran province, Iran

Qasemabad-e Tehranchi Persian: قاسم اباد تهرانچي
- Village
- Location within Iran
- Coordinates: 35°31′58″N 51°33′16″E
- Country: Iran
- Province: Tehran
- County: Ray
- District: Khavaran
- Rural District: Khavaran-e Gharbi

Population (2016)
  - Total: 2,645
- Time zone: UTC+3:30 (IRST)

Qasemabad-e Tehranchi (Persian: قاسم اباد تهرانچي) (Note: Also romanized as Qāsemābād-e Tehrānchī; also known as Qāsemābād) is a village in, and the capital of, Khavaran-e Gharbi Rural District in Khavaran District of Ray County, Tehran province, Iran.

== Demographics ==
=== Population ===
At the time of the 2006 National Census, the village's population was 2,281 in 531 households, when it was in Qaleh Now Rural District of Kahrizak District. The following census in 2011 counted 1,933 people in 510 households, by which time the village had been separated from the district in the formation of Khavaran District. Qasemabad-e Tehranchi was transferred to Khavaran-e Gharbi Rural District created in the new district. The 2016 census measured the population of the village as 2,645 people in 732 households. It was the most populous village in its rural district.
