= Mahmudabad, Khavaran =

Village in Tehran province, Iran

Mahmudabad Persian: محموداباد
- Village
- Location within Iran
- Coordinates: 35°33′03″N 51°32′46″E
- Country: Iran
- Province: Tehran
- County: Ray
- District: Khavaran
- Rural District: Khavaran-e Gharbi

Population (2016)
  - Total: 1,917
- Time zone: UTC+3:30 (IRST)

Mahmudabad (Persian: محموداباد) (Note: Also romanized as Maḩmūdābād) is a village in Khavaran-e Gharbi Rural District of Khavaran District in Ray County, Tehran province, Iran.

== Demographics ==
=== Population ===
At the time of the 2006 National Census, the village's population was 3,322 in 764 households, when it was in Qaleh Now Rural District of Kahrizak District. The following census in 2011 counted 2,239 people in 593 households, by which time the village had been separated from the district in the formation of Khavaran District. Mahmudabad was transferred to Khavaran-e Gharbi Rural District created in the new district. The 2016 census measured the population of the village as 1,917 people in 514 households.
