= Deh Kheyr, Tehran =

Village in Tehran province, Iran

Deh Kheyr Persian: ده خير
- Village
- Location within Iran
- Coordinates: 35°31′57″N 51°27′59″E
- Country: Iran
- Province: Tehran
- County: Ray
- District: Qaleh Now
- Rural District: Chaleh Tarkhan

Population (2016)
  - Total: 2,249
- Time zone: UTC+3:30 (IRST)

Deh Kheyr (Persian: ده خير) is a village in Chaleh Tarkhan Rural District of Qaleh Now District in Ray County, Tehran province, Iran.

== Demographics ==
=== Population ===
At the time of the 2006 National Census, the village's population was 2,542 in 645 households, when it was in Qaleh Now Rural District of Kahrizak District. The following census in 2011 counted 2,509 people in 670 households. The 2016 census measured the population of the village as 2,249 people in 672 households, by which time the rural district had been separated from the district in the formation of Qaleh Now District. Deh Kheyr was transferred to Chaleh Tarkhan Rural District created in the new district.
