= Karimabad-e Tehranchi =

Village in Tehran province, Iran

Karimabad-e Tehranchi Persian: كريم ابادتهرانچي
- Village
- Location within Iran
- Coordinates: 35°30′41″N 51°34′01″E
- Country: Iran
- Province: Tehran
- County: Ray
- District: Qaleh Now
- Rural District: Qaleh Now

Population (2016)
  - Total: 946
- Time zone: UTC+3:30 (IRST)

Karimabad-e Tehranchi (Persian: كريم ابادتهرانچي) (Note: Also romanized as Karīmābād-e Tehrānchī; also known as Karīmābādād-e Qavām and Karīmābādād-e Tehrānchī) is a village in Qaleh Now Rural District of Qaleh Now District in Ray County, Tehran province, Iran.

== Demographics ==
=== Population ===
At the time of the 2006 National Census, the village's population was 804 in 179 households, when it was in Kahrizak District. The following census in 2011 counted 846 people in 226 households. The 2016 census measured the population of the village as 946 people in 162 households, by which time the rural district had been separated from the district in the formation of Qaleh Now District.
