= Qaleh Sangi, Tehran =

Neighborhood in Tehran province, Iran

Qaleh Sangi Persian: قلعه سنگي
- Neighborhood
- Location within Iran
- Coordinates: 35°31′30″N 51°21′15″E
- Country: Iran
- Province: Tehran
- County: Ray
- District: Kahrizak
- City: Kahrizak

Population (2011)
  - Total: 155
  - Density: 1,048/km^{2} (2,710/sq mi)
- Time zone: UTC+3:30 (IRST)

Qaleh Sangi (Persian: قلعه سنگي) (Note: Also romanized as Qal‘eh Sangī and Qal‘eh-ye Sangī) is a neighborhood in the city of Kahrizak in Kahrizak District of Ray County, Tehran province, Iran.

== Demographics ==
=== Population ===
At the time of the 2006 National Census, Qaleh Sangi's population was 758 in 191 households, when it was a village in Kahrizak Rural District. The following census in 2011 counted 1,048 people in 317 households.

The village was annexed by the city of Kahrizak in 2023.
