= Mehdiabad, Rey =

Neighborhood in Tehran province, Iran

Mehdiabad Persian: مهدي اباد
- Neighborhood
- Location within Iran
- Coordinates: 35°29′11″N 51°19′47″E
- Country: Iran
- Province: Tehran
- County: Ray
- District: Kahrizak
- City: Kahrizak

Population (2011)
  - Total: 155
- Time zone: UTC+3:30 (IRST)

Mehdiabad (Persian: مهدي اباد) (Note: Also romanized as Mehdīābād) is a neighborhood in the city of Kahrizak in Kahrizak District of Ray County, Tehran province, Iran.

== Demographics ==
=== Population ===
At the time of the 2006 National Census, Mehdiabad's population was 218 in 51 households, when it was a village in Kahrizak Rural District. The following census in 2011 counted 155 people in 40 households.

The village was annexed by the city of Kahrizak in 2023.
