= Qiamdasht =

Village in Tehran province, Iran

Qiamdasht Persian: قیام دشت
- City
- Location within Iran
- Coordinates: 35°31′17″N 51°38′56″E
- Country: Iran
- Province: Tehran
- County: Ray
- District: Khavaran
- Rural District: Khavaran-e Sharqi

Population (2016)
  - Total: 36,446
- Time zone: UTC+3:30 (IRST)

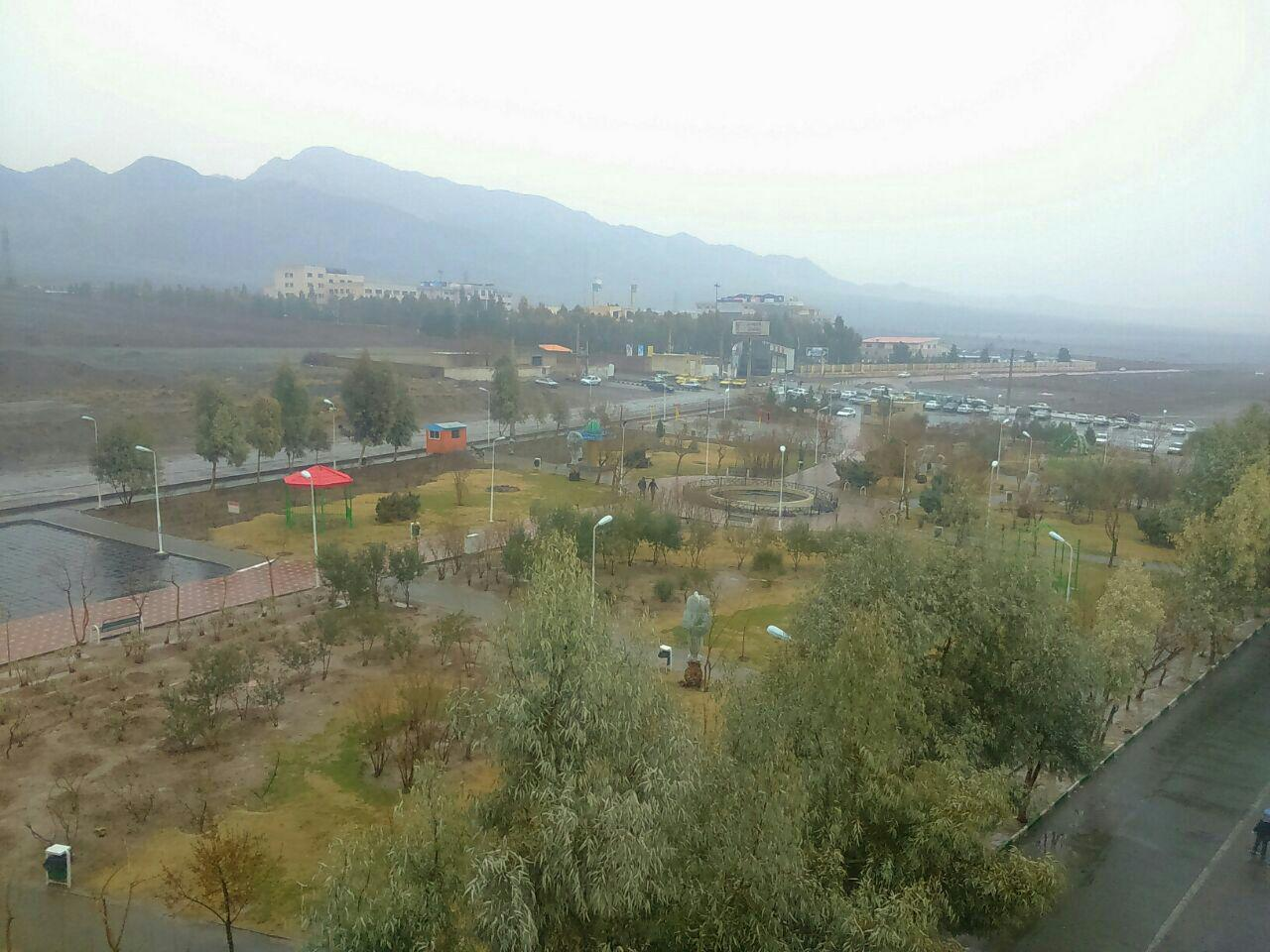
Laleh Park and Islamic Azad University, Qiamdasht Branch.

Qiamdasht (Persian: قیام دشت) (Note: Also romanized as Qīāmdasht) is a city in Khavaran-e Sharqi Rural District of Khavaran District in Ray County, Tehran province, Iran, serving as capital of both the district and the rural district.

== Demographics ==
=== Population ===
At the time of the 2006 National Census, the city's population was 40,396 in 9,781 households, when it was in Ghaniabad Rural District of the Central District. The following census in 2011 counted 38,790 people in 10,636 households, by which time the city had been separated from the district in the formation of Khavaran District. Qiamdasht was transferred to Khavaran-e Sharqi Rural District created in the new district. The 2016 census measured the population of the city as 36,446 people in 10,471 households. It was the most populous city in its rural district.
