= Gol Tappeh-ye Kabir =

Village in Tehran province, Iran

Gol Tappeh-ye Kabir Persian: گل تپه كبير
- Village
- Location within Iran
- Coordinates: 35°29′12″N 51°33′54″E
- Country: Iran
- Province: Tehran
- County: Ray
- District: Qaleh Now
- Rural District: Qaleh Now

Population (2016)
  - Total: 10,850
- Time zone: UTC+3:30 (IRST)

Gol Tappeh-ye Kabir (Persian: گل تپه كبير) (Note: Also romanized as Gol Tappeh-ye Kabīr; also known as Gol Tappeh, Gol Tappeh-ye Kavīr, and Gul Tepe) is a village in Qaleh Now Rural District of Qaleh Now District in Ray County, Tehran province, Iran.

== Demographics ==
=== Population ===
At the time of the 2006 National Census, the village's population was 936 in 250 households, when it was in Kahrizak District. The following census in 2011 counted 2,515 people in 286 households. The 2016 census measured the population of the village as 10,850 people in 219 households, by which time the rural district had been separated from the district in the formation of Qaleh Now District. It was the most populous village in its rural district.
