= Tabain =

Neighborhood in Tehran province, Iran

Tabain Persian: تبائين
- Neighborhood
- Location within Iran
- Coordinates: 35°31′36″N 51°20′47″E
- Country: Iran
- Province: Tehran
- County: Ray
- District: Kahrizak
- City: Kahrizak

Population (2011)
  - Total: 1,182
- Time zone: UTC+3:30 (IRST)

Tabain (Persian: تبائين) (Note: Also romanized as Tabā’īn; also known as Tabāzīn) is a neighborhood in the city of Kahrizak in Kahrizak District of Ray County, Tehran province, Iran.

== Demographics ==
=== Population ===
At the time of the 2006 National Census, Tabain's population was 804 in 155 households, when it was a village in Kahrizak Rural District. The following census in 2011 counted 1,182 people in 268 households.

The village was annexed by the city of Kahrizak in 2023.
