= Abdolabad-e Gardaneh =

Neighborhood in Tehran province, Iran

Abdolabad-e Gardaneh Persian: عبدل ابادگردنه
- Neighborhood
- Location within Iran
- Coordinates: 35°29′25″N 51°18′58″E
- Country: Iran
- Province: Tehran
- County: Ray
- District: Kahrizak
- City: Kahrizak

Population (2011)
  - Total: 749
- Time zone: UTC+3:30 (IRST)

Abdolabad-e Gardaneh (Persian: عبدل ابادگردنه) (Note: Also romanized as ‘Abdolābād-e Gardaneh; also known as ‘Abdolābād) is a neighborhood in the city of Kahrizak in Kahrizak District of Ray County, Tehran province, Iran.

== Demographics ==
=== Population ===
At the time of the 2006 National Census, Abdolabad-e Gardaneh's population was 661 in 166 households, when it was a village in Kahrizak Rural District. The following census in 2011 counted 749 people in 200 households.

The village was annexed by the city of Kahrizak in 2023.
