= Sadeqabad, Tehran =

Neighborhood in Tehran province, Iran

Sadeqabad Persian: صادق اباد
- Neighborhood
- Location within Iran
- Coordinates: 35°29′37″N 51°20′51″E
- Country: Iran
- Province: Tehran
- County: Ray
- District: Kahrizak
- City: Kahrizak

Population (2011)
  - Total: 934
- Time zone: UTC+3:30 (IRST)

Sadeqabad (Persian: صادق اباد) (Note: Also romanized as Şādeqābād) is a neighborhood in the city of Kahrizak in Kahrizak District of Ray County, Tehran province, Iran.

== Demographics ==
=== Population ===
At the time of the 2006 National Census, Sadeqabad's population was 967 in 236 households, when it was a village in Kahrizak Rural District. The following census in 2011 counted 934 people in 243 households.

The village was annexed by the city of Kahrizak in 2023.
