= Moqimabad, Tehran =

Village in Tehran province, Iran

Moqimabad Persian: مقيم اباد
- Village
- Location within Iran
- Coordinates: 35°28′20″N 51°32′31″E
- Country: Iran
- Province: Tehran
- County: Ray
- District: Qaleh Now
- Rural District: Chaleh Tarkhan

Population (2016)
  - Total: 157
- Time zone: UTC+3:30 (IRST)

Moqimabad (Persian: مقيم اباد) (Note: Also romanized as Moqīmābād) is a village in Chaleh Tarkhan Rural District of Qaleh Now District in Ray County, Tehran province, Iran.

== Demographics ==
=== Population ===
At the time of the 2006 National Census, the village's population was 172 in 41 households, when it was in Qaleh Now Rural District of Kahrizak District. The following census in 2011 counted 186 people in 45 households. The 2016 census measured the population of the village as 157 people in 44 households, by which time the rural district had been separated from the district in the formation of Qaleh Now District. Moqimabad was transferred to Chaleh Tarkhan Rural District created in the new district.
