= Zamanabad, Tehran =

Village in Tehran province, Iran

Zamanabad Persian: زمان آباد
- Village
- Location within Iran
- Coordinates: 35°32′51″N 51°30′58″E
- Country: Iran
- Province: Tehran
- County: Ray
- District: Qaleh Now
- Rural District: Qaleh Now

Population (2016)
  - Total: 4,000
- Time zone: UTC+3:30 (IRST)

Zamanabad (Persian: زمان آباد) (Note: Also romanized as Zamānābād) is a village in Qaleh Now Rural District of Qaleh Now District in Ray County, Tehran province, Iran.

== Demographics ==
=== Population ===
At the time of the 2006 National Census, the village's population was 2,343 in 584 households, when it was in Kahrizak District. The following census in 2011 counted 3,235 people in 863 households. The 2016 census measured the population of the village as 4,000 people in 1,141 households, by which time the rural district had been separated from the district in the formation of Qaleh Now District.
