= Shahrak-e Emam Hasan-e Mojtaba =

Neighborhood in Tehran province, Iran

Shahrak-e Emam Hasan-e Mojtaba Persian: شهرک امام حسن مجتبی
- Neighborhood
- Location within Iran
- Coordinates: 35°29′19″N 51°20′45″E
- Country: Iran
- Province: Tehran
- County: Ray
- District: Kahrizak
- City: Kahrizak

Population (2011)
  - Total: 5,403
- Time zone: UTC+3:30 (IRST)

Shahrak-e Emam Hasan-e Mojtaba (Persian: شهرک امام حسن مجتبی) (Note: Also romanized as Shahrak-e Emām Ḩasan-e Mojtabá) is a neighborhood in the city of Kahrizak in Kahrizak District of Ray County, Tehran province, Iran.

== Demographics ==
=== Population ===
At the time of the 2006 National Census, Shahrak-e Emam Hasan-e Mojtaba's population was 5,394 in 1,275 households, when it was a village in Kahrizak Rural District. The following census in 2011 counted 5,403 people in 1,352 households.

The village was annexed by the city of Kahrizak in 2023.
