= Mohammadabad-e Amin =

Neighborhood in Tehran province, Iran

Mohammadabad-e Amin Persian: محمدابادامين
- Neighborhood
- Location within Iran
- Country: Iran
- Province: Tehran
- County: Ray
- District: Kahrizak
- City: Kahrizak

Population (2011)
  - Total: 39
- Time zone: UTC+3:30 (IRST)

Mohammadabad-e Amin (Persian: محمدابادامين) (Note: Also romanized as Moḩammadābād-e Amīn and Moḩammadābād-e Amīnī) is a neighborhood in the city of Kahrizak in Kahrizak District of Ray County, Tehran province, Iran.

== Demographics ==
=== Population ===
At the time of the 2006 National Census, Mohammadabad-e Amin's population was 280 in 83 households, when it was a village in Kahrizak Rural District. The following census in 2011 counted 39 people in 10 households.

The village was annexed by the city of Kahrizak in 2023.
