= Qaleh Sheykh, Tehran =

Neighborhood in Tehran province, Iran

Qaleh Sheykh Persian: قلعه شيخ
- Neighborhood
- Location within Iran
- Coordinates: 35°30′09″N 51°21′59″E
- Country: Iran
- Province: Tehran
- County: Ray
- District: Kahrizak
- City: Kahrizak

Population (2011)
  - Total: 3,078
- Time zone: UTC+3:30 (IRST)

Qaleh Sheykh (Persian: قلعه شيخ) (Note: Also romanized as Qal‘eh Sheykh and Qal‘eh-ye Sheykh) is a neighborhood in the city of Kahrizak in Kahrizak District of Ray County, Tehran province, Iran.

== Demographics ==
=== Population ===
At the time of the 2006 National Census, Qaleh Sheykh's population was 1,402 in 344 households, when it was a village in Kahrizak Rural District. The following census in 2011 counted 3,078 people in 428 households.

The village was annexed by the city of Kahrizak in 2023.
