= Qasemabad-e Shurabad =

Neighborhood in Tehran province, Iran

Qasemabad-e Shurabad Persian: قاسم ابادشوراباد
- Neighborhood
- Location within Iran
- Coordinates: 35°27′58″N 51°21′19″E
- Country: Iran
- Province: Tehran
- County: Ray
- District: Kahrizak
- City: Kahrizak

Population (2011)
  - Total: 2,213
- Time zone: UTC+3:30 (IRST)

Qasemabad-e Shurabad (Persian: قاسم ابادشوراباد) (Note: Also romanized as Qāsemābād-e Shūrābād; also known as Qāsemābād) is a neighborhood in the city of Kahrizak in Kahrizak District of Ray County, Tehran province, Iran.

== Demographics ==
=== Population ===
At the time of the 2006 National Census, Qasemabad-e Shurabad's population was 2,433 in 662 households, when it was a village in Kahrizak Rural District. The following census in 2011 counted 2,213 people in 628 households.

The village was annexed by the city of Kahrizak in 2023.
