= Aliabad-e Qeysariyeh =

Village in Tehran province, Iran

Aliabad-e Qeysariyeh Persian: علي ابادقيصريه
- Village
- Location within Iran
- Coordinates: 35°30′00″N 51°35′19″E
- Country: Iran
- Province: Tehran
- County: Ray
- District: Qaleh Now
- Rural District: Qaleh Now

Population (2016)
  - Total: 25
- Time zone: UTC+3:30 (IRST)

Aliabad-e Qeysariyeh (Persian: علي ابادقيصريه) (Note: Also romanized as Alīābād-e Qeyşarīyeh; also known as ‘Alīābād) is a village in Qaleh Now Rural District of Qaleh Now District in Ray County, Tehran province, Iran.

== Demographics ==
=== Population ===
At the time of the 2006 National Census, the village's population was 110 in 23 households, when it was in Kahrizak District. The following census in 2011 counted 90 people in 26 households. The 2016 census measured the population of the village as 25 people in seven households, by which time the rural district had been separated from the district in the formation of Qaleh Now District.
