= Talebabad, Tehran =

Village in Tehran province, Iran

Talebabad Persian: طالب اباد
- Village
- Location within Iran
- Coordinates: 35°30′05″N 51°31′44″E
- Country: Iran
- Province: Tehran
- County: Ray
- District: Qaleh Now
- Rural District: Qaleh Now

Population (2016)
  - Total: 2,514
- Time zone: UTC+3:30 (IRST)

Talebabad (Persian: طالب اباد) (Note: Also romanized as Ţālebābād) is a village in Qaleh Now Rural District of Qaleh Now District in Ray County, Tehran province, Iran.

== Demographics ==
=== Population ===
At the time of the 2006 National Census, the village's population was 2,530 in 616 households, when it was in Kahrizak District. The following census in 2011 counted 2,548 people in 710 households. The 2016 census measured the population of the village as 2,514 people in 737 households, by which time the rural district had been separated from the district in the formation of Qaleh Now District.
