= Hamzehabad, Tehran =

Neighborhood in Tehran province, Iran

Hamzehabad Persian: حمزه اباد
- Neighborhood
- Location within Iran
- Coordinates: 35°29′08″N 51°21′25″E
- Country: Iran
- Province: Tehran
- County: Ray
- District: Kahrizak
- City: Kahrizak

Population (2011)
  - Total: 397
- Time zone: UTC+3:30 (IRST)

Hamzehabad (Persian: حمزه اباد) (Note: Also romanized as Ḩamzehābād) is a neighborhood in the city of Kahrizak in Kahrizak District of Ray County, Tehran province, Iran.

== Demographics ==
=== Population ===
At the time of the 2006 National Census, Hamzehabad's population was 286 in 76 households, when it was a village in Kahrizak Rural District. The following census in 2011 counted 397 people in 101 households.

The village was annexed by the city of Kahrizak in 2023.
