= Hoseynabad, Rey =

Hoseynabad حسين اباد
- Village
- Location within Iran
- Coordinates: 35°28′30″N 51°21′02″E
- Country: Iran
- Province: Tehran
- County: Rey
- Bakhsh: Fashapuyeh
- Rural District: Koleyn

Population (2006)
  - Total: 41
- Time zone: UTC+3:30 (IRST)
  - Summer (DST): UTC+4:30 (IRDT)

Hoseynabad (Persian: حسين اباد, also Romanized as Ḩoseynābād) is a village in Koleyn Rural District, Fashapuyeh District, Ray County, Tehran Province, Iran. At the 2006 census, its population was 41, in 11 families.
