= Ghaniabad =

Ghaniabad (Persian: غني اباد) may refer to:

- Ghaniabad, Razavi Khorasan
- Ghaniabad, Semnan
- Ghaniabad, Boshruyeh, South Khorasan Province
- Ghaniabad, Tabas, South Khorasan Province
- Ghaniabad, Tehran
- Ghaniabad Rural District, in Tehran Province
