= Aliabad-e Mowqufeh =

Aliabad-e Mowqufeh علي ابادموقوفه
- Village
- Location within Iran
- Coordinates: 35°14′31″N 51°27′56″E
- Country: Iran
- Province: Tehran
- County: Rey
- Bakhsh: Fashapuyeh
- Rural District: Koleyn

Population (2006)
  - Total: 95
- Time zone: UTC+3:30 (IRST)
  - Summer (DST): UTC+4:30 (IRDT)

Aliabad-e Mowqufeh (Persian: علي ابادموقوفه, also Romanized as ‘Alīābād-e Mowqūfeh; also known as ‘Alīābād) is a village in Koleyn Rural District, Fashapuyeh District, Ray County, Tehran Province, Iran. At the 2006 census, its population was 95, in 20 families.
