= Mohammadabad, Ray =

Mohammadabad محمداباد
- Village
- Location within Iran
- Coordinates: 35°19′57″N 51°23′42″E
- Country: Iran
- Province: Tehran
- County: Rey
- Bakhsh: Fashapuyeh
- Rural District: Koleyn

Population (2006)
  - Total: 113
- Time zone: UTC+3:30 (IRST)
  - Summer (DST): UTC+4:30 (IRDT)

Mohammadabad (Persian: محمداباد, also Romanized as Moḩammadābād and Muhammadābād) is a village in Koleyn Rural District, Fashapuyeh District, Ray County, Tehran Province, Iran. At the 2006 census, its population was 113, in 35 families.
