= Chaleh Tarkhan Rural District =

Rural district in Tehran province, Iran

Chaleh Tarkhan Rural District Persian: دهستان چاله طرخان
- Rural District
- Location within Iran
- Coordinates: 35°28′N 51°30′E
- Country: Iran
- Province: Tehran
- County: Ray
- District: Qaleh Now
- Established: 2012
- Capital: Chaleh Tarkhan

Population (2016)
  - Total: 14,299
- Time zone: UTC+3:30 (IRST)

Chaleh Tarkhan Rural District (Persian: دهستان چاله طرخان) is in Qaleh Now District of Ray County, Tehran province, Iran. Its capital is the village of Chaleh Tarkhan.

== History ==
In 2012, Qaleh Now Rural District and portions of Kahrizak Rural District were separated from Kahrizak District in the formation of Qaleh Now District, and Chaleh Tarkhan Rural District was created in the new district.

== Demographics ==
=== Population ===
At the time of the 2016 census, the rural district's population was 14,299 in 4,188 households. The most populous of its nine villages was Firuzabad, with 8,756 people.

=== Other villages in the rural district ===
- Deh Kheyr
- Eshqabad
- Hamidabad
- Moqimabad
- Najmabad
- Nazarabad
- Qomiabad
