= Andarman =

Village in Tehran province, Iran

Andarman Persian: اندرمان
- Village
- Location within Iran
- Coordinates: 35°35′48″N 51°24′27″E
- Country: Iran
- Province: Tehran
- County: Ray
- District: Central
- Rural District: Azimiyeh

Population (2016)
  - Total: 451
- Time zone: UTC+3:30 (IRST)

Andarman (Persian: اندرمان) (Note: Also romanized as Andarmān and Andarmūn; also known as Andarhān) is a village in Azimiyeh Rural District of the Central District in Ray County, Tehran province, Iran.

== Demographics ==
=== Population ===
At the time of the 2006 National Census, the village's population was 424 in 115 households. The following census in 2011 counted 300 people in 97 households. The 2016 census measured the population of the village as 451 people in 134 households.
