= Qaleh-ye Mohammad Ali Khan =

Village in Tehran province, Iran

Qaleh-ye Mohammad Ali Khan Persian: قلعه محمدعليخان
- Village
- Location within Iran
- Coordinates: 35°15′10″N 50°58′52″E
- Country: Iran
- Province: Tehran
- County: Ray
- District: Fashapuyeh
- Rural District: Hasanabad

Population (2016)
  - Total: 69
- Time zone: UTC+3:30 (IRST)

Qaleh-ye Mohammad Ali Khan (Persian: قلعه محمدعليخان) (Note: Also romanized as Qal‘eh Moḩammad ‘Alī Khān and Qal‘eh-ye Muhammad ‘Ali Khān; also known as Moḩammad ‘Alī Khān) is a village in Hasanabad Rural District of Fashapuyeh District in Ray County, Tehran province, Iran.

== Demographics ==
=== Population ===
At the time of the 2006 National Census, the village's population was 65 in 22 households. The following census in 2011 counted 67 people in 25 households. The 2016 census measured the population of the village as 69 people in 29 households.
