= Eslamabad, Azimiyeh =

Village in Tehran province, Iran

Eslamabad Persian: اسلام آباد
- Village
- Location within Iran
- Coordinates: 35°33′46″N 51°28′19″E
- Country: Iran
- Province: Tehran
- County: Ray
- District: Central
- Rural District: Azimiyeh

Population (2016)
  - Total: 9,999
- Time zone: UTC+3:30 (IRST)

Eslamabad (Persian: اسلام آباد) (Note: Also romanized as Eslāmābād; also known as Ashrafābād) is a village in, and the capital of, Azimiyeh Rural District in the Central District of Ray County, Tehran province, Iran.

== Demographics ==
=== Population ===
At the time of the 2006 National Census, the village's population was 10,763 in 2,350 households. The following census in 2011 counted 11,070 people in 2,804 households. The 2016 census measured the population of the village as 9,999 people in 2,733 households.
