= Koleyn =

Koleyn (Persian: كلين) may refer to:

- Koleyn, Qazvin
- Koleyn, Tehran
- Koleyn Rural District, in Tehran Province
