= Taqiabad, Ray =

Village in Tehran province, Iran

Taqiabad Persian: تقي آباد
- Village
- Location within Iran
- Coordinates: 35°34′53″N 51°27′57″E
- Country: Iran
- Province: Tehran
- County: Ray
- District: Central
- Rural District: Ghaniabad

Population (2016)
  - Total: 819
- Time zone: UTC+3:30 (IRST)

Taqiabad (Persian: تقي آباد) (Note: Also romanized as Taqīābād) is a village in Ghaniabad Rural District of the Central District of Ray County, Tehran province, Iran.

== Demographics ==
=== Population ===
The village did not appear in the 2006 and 2011 National Censuses. The 2016 census measured the population of the village as 819 people in 241 households.
