= Abbasabad, Ray =

Village in Tehran province, Iran

Abbasabad Persian: عباس‌آباد
- Village
- Location within Iran
- Coordinates: 35°34′13″N 51°28′08″E
- Country: Iran
- Province: Tehran
- County: Ray
- District: Central
- Rural District: Azimiyeh

Population (2016)
  - Total: 4,708
- Time zone: UTC+3:30 (IRST)

Abbasabad (Persian: عباس‌آباد) (Note: Also romanized as Abasabad and ‘Abbāsābād) is a village in Azimiyeh Rural District of the Central District in Ray County, Tehran province, Iran.

== Demographics ==
=== Population ===
At the time of the 2006 National Census, the village's population was 5,683 in 1,373 households. The following census in 2011 counted 5,122 people in 1,429 households. The 2016 census measured the population of the village as 4,708 people in 1,320 households.
