= Qamsar, Tehran =

Village in Tehran province, Iran

Qamsar Persian: قمصر
- Village
- Location within Iran
- Coordinates: 35°30′35″N 51°24′09″E
- Country: Iran
- Province: Tehran
- County: Ray
- District: Kahrizak
- Rural District: Kahrizak

Population (2016)
  - Total: 5,717
- Time zone: UTC+3:30 (IRST)

Qamsar (Persian: قمصر) (Note: Also romanized as Qamşar; also known as Shahrak-e Qamşar) is a village in Kahrizak Rural District of Kahrizak District in Ray County, Tehran province, Iran.

== Demographics ==
=== Population ===
At the time of the 2006 National Census, the village's population was 4,732 in 1,140 households. The following census in 2011 counted 5,676 people in 1,539 households. The 2016 census measured the population of the village as 5,717 people in 1,763 households.
