= Dowlatabad-e Qeysariyeh =

Village in Tehran province, Iran

Dowlatabad-e Qeysariyeh Persian: دولت آبادقيصريه
- Village
- Location within Iran
- Country: Iran
- Province: Tehran
- County: Ray
- District: Central
- Rural District: Azimiyeh

Population (2016)
  - Total: 599
- Time zone: UTC+3:30 (IRST)

Dowlatabad-e Qeysariyeh (Persian: دولت آبادقيصريه) (Note: Also romanized as Dowlatābād-e Qeyşarīyeh) is a village in Azimiyeh Rural District of the Central District in Ray County, Tehran province, Iran.

== Demographics ==
=== Population ===
At the time of the 2006 National Census, the village's population was 920 in 230 households. The following census in 2011 counted 896 people in 255 households. The 2016 census measured the population of the village as 599 people in 178 households.
