= Ebrahimabad, Ray =

Village in Tehran province, Iran

Ebrahimabad Persian: ابراهيم اباد
- Village
- Location within Iran
- Coordinates: 35°21′57″N 51°17′01″E
- Country: Iran
- Province: Tehran
- County: Ray
- District: Fashapuyeh
- Rural District: Koleyn

Population (2016)
  - Total: 3,530
- Time zone: UTC+3:30 (IRST)

Ebrahimabad (Persian: ابراهيم اباد) (Note: Also romanized as Ebrāhīmābād) is a village in Koleyn Rural District of Fashapuyeh District in Ray County, Tehran province, Iran.

== Demographics ==
=== Population ===
At the time of the 2006 National Census, the village's population was 1,242 in 284 households. The following census in 2011 counted 3,135 people in 783 households. The 2016 census measured the population of the village as 3,530 people in 808 households. It was the most populous village in its rural district.
