= Valiabad, Ray =

Village in Tehran province, Iran

Valiabad Persian: ولي آباد
- Village
- Location within Iran
- Coordinates: 35°35′05″N 51°25′48″E
- Country: Iran
- Province: Tehran
- County: Ray
- District: Central
- Rural District: Azimiyeh

Population (2016)
  - Total: 3,694
- Time zone: UTC+3:30 (IRST)

Valiabad (Persian: ولي آباد) (Note: Also romanized as Valīābād; also known as Valīābād-e Beheshtī and Vallad-e Beheshtī) is a village in Azimiyeh Rural District of the Central District in Ray County, Tehran province, Iran.

== Demographics ==
=== Population ===
At the time of the 2006 National Census, the village's population was 3,252 in 918 households. The following census in 2011 counted 2,963 people in 884 households. The 2016 census measured the population of the village as 3,694 people in 1,173 households.
