= Moqimabad =

Moqimabad (Persian: مقيم اباد) may refer to:

- Moqimabad, Razavi Khorasan
- Moqimabad, Tehran
