= Fathabad, Ray =

Village in Tehran province, Iran

Fathabad Persian: فتح‌آباد
- Village
- Location within Iran
- Coordinates: 35°34′18″N 51°24′48″E
- Country: Iran
- Province: Tehran
- County: Ray
- District: Central
- Rural District: Azimiyeh

Population (2016)
  - Total: 302
- Time zone: UTC+3:30 (IRST)

Fathabad (Persian: فتح ا باد) (Note: Also romanized as Fatḩābād) is a village in Azimiyeh Rural District of the Central District in Ray County, Tehran province, Iran.

== Demographics ==
=== Population ===
At the time of the 2006 National Census, the village's population was 404 in 111 households. The following census in 2011 counted 83 people in 27 households. The 2016 census measured the population of the village as 302 people in 105 households.
