= Gol Hesar =

Village in Tehran province, Iran

Gol Hesar Persian: گل حصار
- Village
- Location within Iran
- Coordinates: 35°32′49″N 51°26′47″E
- Country: Iran
- Province: Tehran
- County: Ray
- District: Kahrizak
- Rural District: Kahrizak

Population (2016)
  - Total: 6,888
- Time zone: UTC+3:30 (IRST)

Gol Hesar (Persian: گل حصار) (Note: Also romanized as Gol Ḩeşār; formerly known as Quch Hesar (قوچ حصار), also romanized as Qūch Ḩeşār, Qūch Ḩeşar, and Qūchḩeşār) is a village in Kahrizak Rural District of Kahrizak District in Ray County, Tehran province, Iran.

== Demographics ==
=== Population ===
At the time of the 2006 National Census, the village's population was 4,399 in 1,046 households. The following census in 2011 counted 4,330 people in 1,154 households. The 2016 census measured the population of the village as 6,888 people in 1,937 households. It was the most populous village in its rural district.
