= Salehabad-e Sharqi =

Village in Tehran province, Iran

Salehabad-e Sharqi Persian: صا لح ا باد شر قي
- Village
- Location within Iran
- Coordinates: 35°36′23″N 51°23′35″E
- Country: Iran
- Province: Tehran
- County: Ray
- District: Central
- Rural District: Azimiyeh

Population (2016)
  - Total: 4,178
- Time zone: UTC+3:30 (IRST)

Salehabad-e Sharqi (Persian: صا لح ا باد شر قي) (Note: Also romanized as Şāleḩābād-e Sharqī; also known as Sālehābād, Şāleḩābād, Shahrak-e Şāleḩābād, and Shahrak-e Şāleḩābād-e Sharqī) is a village in Azimiyeh Rural District of the Central District in Ray County, Tehran province, Iran.

== Demographics ==
=== Population ===
At the time of the 2006 National Census, the village's population was 5,753 in 1,349 households. The following census in 2011 counted 5,509 people in 1,439 households. The 2016 census measured the population of the village as 4,178 people in 1,195 households.
