= Qanbarabad, Tehran =

Village in Tehran province, Iran

Qanbarabad Persian: قنبراباد
- Village
- Location within Iran
- Coordinates: 35°17′28″N 51°27′03″E
- Country: Iran
- Province: Tehran
- County: Ray
- District: Fashapuyeh
- Rural District: Koleyn

Population (2016)
  - Total: 108
- Time zone: UTC+3:30 (IRST)

Qanbarabad (Persian: قنبراباد) (Note: Also romanized as Qanbarābād) is a village in Koleyn Rural District of Fashapuyeh District in Ray County, Tehran province, Iran.

== Demographics ==
=== Population ===
At the time of the 2006 National Census, the village's population was 76 in 20 households. The following census in 2011 counted 61 people in 12 households. The 2016 census measured the population of the village as 108 people in 22 households.
