= Alayin, Ray =

Village in Tehran province, Iran

Alayin Persian: علائين
- Village
- Location within Iran
- Coordinates: 35°35′03″N 51°27′17″E
- Country: Iran
- Province: Tehran
- County: Ray
- District: Central
- Rural District: Azimiyeh

Population (2016)
  - Total: 21,594
- Time zone: UTC+3:30 (IRST)

Alayin (Persian: علائين) (Note: Also romanized as ʿAlāyīn) is a village in Azimiyeh Rural District of the Central District in Ray County, Tehran province, Iran.

== Demographics ==
=== Population ===
At the time of the 2006 National Census, the village's population was 24,179 in 6,221 households. The following census in 2011 counted 24,808 people in 7,235 households. The 2016 census measured the population of the village as 21,594 people in 6,579 households. It was the most populous village in its rural district.
