= Salmanabad, Fashapuyeh =

Village in Tehran province, Iran

Salmanabad Persian: سلمان اباد
- Village
- Location within Iran
- Coordinates: 35°23′10″N 51°11′22″E
- Country: Iran
- Province: Tehran
- County: Ray
- District: Fashapuyeh
- Rural District: Hasanabad

Population (2016)
  - Total: 15
- Time zone: UTC+3:30 (IRST)

Salmanabad (Persian: سلمان اباد) (Note: Also romanized as Salmānābād; also known as Soleymānābād) is a village in Hasanabad Rural District of Fashapuyeh District in Ray County, Tehran province, Iran.

== Demographics ==
=== Population ===
At the time of the 2006 National Census, the village's population was 938 in 225 households. The following census in 2011 counted 79 people in 21 households. The 2016 census measured the population of the village as 15 people in five households.
