= Aminabad, Ray =

Village in Tehran province, Iran

Aminabad Persian: امين آباد
- Village
- Location within Iran
- Coordinates: 35°34′48″N 51°29′07″E
- Country: Iran
- Province: Tehran
- County: Ray
- District: Central
- Rural District: Ghaniabad

Population (2016)
  - Total: 7,778
- Time zone: UTC+3:30 (IRST)

Aminabad (Persian: امين آباد) (Note: Also romanized as Amīnābād) is a village in Ghaniabad Rural District of the Central District of Ray County, Tehran province, Iran.

== Demographics ==
=== Population ===
The village did not appear in the 2006 National Census. The following census in 2011 counted 8,873 people in 2,361 households. The 2016 census measured the population of the village as 7,778 people in 2,166 households.
