= Khomarabad =

Village in Tehran province, Iran

Khomarabad Persian: خماراباد
- Village
- Location within Iran
- Coordinates: 35°16′24″N 51°26′25″E
- Country: Iran
- Province: Tehran
- County: Ray
- District: Fashapuyeh
- Rural District: Koleyn

Population (2016)
  - Total: 144
- Time zone: UTC+3:30 (IRST)

Khomarabad (Persian: خماراباد) (Note: Also romanized as Khomārābād) is a village in Koleyn Rural District of Fashapuyeh District in Ray County, Tehran province, Iran.

== Demographics ==
=== Population ===
At the time of the 2006 National Census, the village's population was 152 in 32 households. The following census in 2011 counted 161 people in 32 households. The 2016 census measured the population of the village as 144 people in 35 households.
