= Beheshti, Tehran =

Village in Tehran province, Iran

Beheshti Persian: بهشتي
- Village
- Location within Iran
- Coordinates: 35°34′43″N 51°25′11″E
- Country: Iran
- Province: Tehran
- County: Ray
- District: Central
- Rural District: Azimiyeh

Population (2016)
  - Total: 6,886
- Time zone: UTC+3:30 (IRST)

Beheshti (Persian: بهشتي) (Note: Also romanized as Beheshtī; also known as Behesht-e Zahrā) is a village in Azimiyeh Rural District of the Central District in Ray County, Tehran province, Iran. Behesht-e Zahra cemetery is located nearby.

== Demographics ==
=== Population ===
At the time of the 2006 National Census, the village's population was 8,569 in 2,262 households. The following census in 2011 counted 8,055 people in 2,318 households. The 2016 census measured the population of the village as 6,886 people in 2,112 households.
