= Deh-e Now, Tehran =

Village in Tehran province, Iran

Deh-e Now Persian: ده نو
- Village
- Location within Iran
- Coordinates: 35°30′37″N 51°23′30″E
- Country: Iran
- Province: Tehran
- County: Ray
- District: Kahrizak
- Rural District: Kahrizak

Population (2016)
  - Total: 687
- Time zone: UTC+3:30 (IRST)

Deh-e Now (Persian: ده نو) (Note: Also romanized as Deh Now) is a village in Kahrizak Rural District of Kahrizak District in Ray County, Tehran province, Iran.

== Demographics ==
=== Population ===
At the time of the 2006 National Census, the village's population was 276 in 65 households. The following census in 2011 counted 545 people in 152 households. The 2016 census measured the population of the village as 687 people in 199 households.
