= Khavar Shahr =

Village in Tehran province, Iran

Khavar Shahr Persian: خاورشهر
- Village
- Location within Iran
- Coordinates: 35°33′25″N 51°33′29″E
- Country: Iran
- Province: Tehran
- County: Ray
- District: Central
- Rural District: Ghaniabad

Population (2016)
  - Total: 13,203
- Time zone: UTC+3:30 (IRST)

Khavar Shahr (Persian: خاورشهر) (Note: Also romanized as Khāvar Shahr; also known as Shahrak-e Khāvar Shahr) is a village in Ghaniabad Rural District of the Central District of Ray County, Tehran province, Iran.

== Demographics ==
=== Population ===
At the time of the 2006 National Census, the village's population was 16,171 in 4,342 households. The following census in 2011 counted 15,148 people in 4,484 households. The 2016 census measured the population of the village as 13,203 people in 4,002 households. It was the most populous village in its rural district.
