= Zivan, Iran =

Village in Tehran province, Iran

Zivan Persian: زيوان
- Village
- Location within Iran
- Coordinates: 35°21′27″N 51°15′59″E
- Country: Iran
- Province: Tehran
- County: Ray
- District: Fashapuyeh
- Rural District: Koleyn

Population (2016)
  - Total: 964
- Time zone: UTC+3:30 (IRST)

Zivan (Persian: زيوان) (Note: Also romanized as Zīvān) is a village in Koleyn Rural District of Fashapuyeh District in Ray County, Tehran province, Iran.

== Demographics ==
=== Population ===
At the time of the 2006 National Census, the village's population was 693 in 171 households. The following census in 2011 counted 849 people in 222 households. The 2016 census measured the population of the village as 964 people in 251 households.
