= Khorin =

Khorin may refer to:

- Aleksandr Khorin (b. 1986), Russian footballer
- Khurin (disambiguation), places in Iran
