= Khanloq, Tehran =

Village in Tehran province, Iran

Khanloq Persian: خانلق
- Village
- Location within Iran
- Coordinates: 35°19′54″N 51°20′04″E
- Country: Iran
- Province: Tehran
- County: Ray
- District: Fashapuyeh
- Rural District: Koleyn

Population (2016)
  - Total: 494
- Time zone: UTC+3:30 (IRST)

Khanloq (Persian: خانلق) (Note: Also romanized as Khānloq; also known as Khānlūq) is a village in Koleyn Rural District of Fashapuyeh District in Ray County, Tehran province, Iran.

== Demographics ==
=== Population ===
At the time of the 2006 National Census, the village's population was 740 in 183 households. The following census in 2011 counted 534 people in 145 households. The 2016 census measured the population of the village as 494 people in 139 households.
