= Dutuheh =

Dutuheh (Persian: دوتوهه) or Dohtuheh (Persian: ده توهه) or Do Tuyeh or Dowpuyeh or Dotuyeh or Dutuyeh may refer to:

- Dohtuheh-ye Olya
- Dutuheh-ye Sofla
