= Qeysarabad =

Village in Tehran province, Iran

Qeysarabad Persian: قیصرآباد
- Village
- Location within Iran
- Coordinates: 35°31′04″N 51°18′49″E
- Country: Iran
- Province: Tehran
- County: Ray
- District: Kahrizak
- Rural District: Kahrizak

Population (2016)
  - Total: 511
- Time zone: UTC+3:30 (IRST)

Qeysarabad (Persian: قیصرآباد) (Note: Also romanized as Qeyşarābād) is a village in Kahrizak Rural District of Kahrizak District in Ray County, Tehran province, Iran.

== Demographics ==
=== Population ===
At the time of the 2006 National Census, the village's population was 692 in 167 households. The following census in 2011 counted 631 people in 165 households. The 2016 census measured the population of the village as 511 people in 145 households.
