= Emad Avar =

Village in Tehran province, Iran

Emad Avar Persian: عمادآور
- Village
- Location within Iran
- Coordinates: 35°34′34″N 51°25′55″E
- Country: Iran
- Province: Tehran
- County: Ray
- District: Central
- Rural District: Azimiyeh

Population (2016)
  - Total: 432
- Time zone: UTC+3:30 (IRST)

Emad Avar (Persian: عمادآور) (Note: Also romanized as ‘Emād Āvar; also known as Aḩmad-e Vard, ‘Emād Āvard, and Emād Āvard) is a village in Azimiyeh Rural District of the Central District in Ray County, Tehran province, Iran.

== Demographics ==
=== Population ===
At the time of the 2006 National Census, the village's population was 842 in 220 households. The following census in 2011 counted 667 people in 188 households. The 2016 census measured the population of the village as 432 people in 125 households.
