= Vijin =

Vijin (Persian: ويجين) may refer to:

- Vijin-e Bala
- Vijin-e Pain
