= Darsunabad =

Village in Tehran province, Iran

Darsunabad Persian: درسون آباد
- Village
- Location within Iran
- Coordinates: 35°30′06″N 51°25′37″E
- Country: Iran
- Province: Tehran
- County: Ray
- District: Kahrizak
- Rural District: Kahrizak

Population (2016)
  - Total: 1,034
- Time zone: UTC+3:30 (IRST)

Darsunabad (Persian: درسون آباد) (Note: Also romanized as Darsūnābād; also known as Dūrsūnābād) is a village in Kahrizak Rural District of Kahrizak District in Ray County, Tehran province, Iran.

== Demographics ==
=== Population ===
At the time of the 2006 National Census, the village's population was 957 in 232 households. The following census in 2011 counted 1,087 people in 271 households. The 2016 census measured the population of the village as 1,034 people in 286 households.
