= Eslamabad, Ghaniabad =

Village in Tehran province, Iran

Eslamabad Persian: اسلام اباد
- Village
- Location within Iran
- Coordinates: 35°33′38″N 51°31′09″E
- Country: Iran
- Province: Tehran
- County: Ray
- District: Central
- Rural District: Ghaniabad

Population (2016)
  - Total: 4,820
- Time zone: UTC+3:30 (IRST)

Eslamabad (Persian: اسلام اباد) (Note: Also romanized as Eslāmābād; also known as Ashrafabad, also romanized as Ashrafābād (اشرف آباد)) is a village in Ghaniabad Rural District of the Central District of Ray County, Tehran province, Iran.

== Demographics ==
=== Population ===
At the time of the 2006 National Census, the village's population was 5,268 in 1,221 households. The following census in 2011 counted 5,617 people in 1,481 households. The 2016 census measured the population of the village as 4,820 people in 1,475 households.
