= Chehel Qez va Siah Darreh =

Village in Tehran province, Iran

Chehel Qez va Siah Darreh Persian: چهل قزوسياه دره
- Village
- Location within Iran
- Coordinates: 35°32′37″N 51°38′46″E
- Country: Iran
- Province: Tehran
- County: Ray
- District: Khavaran
- Rural District: Khavaran-e Sharqi

Population (2016)
  - Total: 2,466
- Time zone: UTC+3:30 (IRST)

Sang Tarashan (Persian: سنگ تراشان) (Note: Also romanized as Sang Tarāshān; also known as Sang Tarāshūn) is a village in Khavaran-e Sharqi Rural District of Khavaran District in Ray County, Tehran province, Iran.

== Demographics ==
=== Population ===
At the time of the 2006 National Census, the village's population was 120 in 32 households, when it was in Hesar-e Amir Rural District of the Central District in Pakdasht County. The following census in 2011 counted 146 people in 40 households, by which time the village had been separated from the county in the formation of Khavaran District in Ray County. Chehel Qez va Siah Darreh was transferred to Khavaran-e Sharqi Rural District created in the new district. The 2016 census measured the population of the village as 172 people in 57 households.
