= Kenar Gerd-e Pain =

Village in Tehran province, Iran

Kenar Gerd-e Pain Persian: كنارگردپائين
- Village
- Location within Iran
- Coordinates: 35°22′06″N 51°16′11″E
- Country: Iran
- Province: Tehran
- County: Ray
- District: Fashapuyeh
- Rural District: Hasanabad

Population (2016)
  - Total: 266
- Time zone: UTC+3:30 (IRST)

Kenar Gerd-e Pain (Persian: كنارگردپائين) (Note: Also romanized as Kenār Gerd-e Pā’īn) is a village in Hasanabad Rural District of Fashapuyeh District in Ray County, Tehran province, Iran.

== Demographics ==
=== Population ===
At the time of the 2006 National Census, the village's population was 207 in 52 households. The following census in 2011 counted 237 people in 58 households. The 2016 census measured the population of the village as 266 people in 73 households.
