= Azimabad, Tehran =

Azimabad عظيم آباد
- Village
- Location within Iran
- Coordinates: 35°31′23″N 51°25′53″E
- Country: Iran
- Province: Tehran
- County: Rey
- Bakhsh: Kahrizak
- Rural District: Kahrizak

Population (2006)
  - Total: 288
- Time zone: UTC+3:30 (IRST)
  - Summer (DST): UTC+4:30 (IRDT)

Azimabad (Persian: عظيم آباد, also Romanized as ‘Az̧īmābād) is a village in Kahrizak Rural District, Kahrizak District, Ray County, Tehran Province, Iran. At the 2006 census, its population was 288, in 73 families.
