= Khurain =

Khurain خورايين
- Village
- Location within Iran
- Coordinates: 35°34′22″N 51°24′09″E
- Country: Iran
- Province: Tehran
- County: Rey
- Bakhsh: Kahrizak
- Rural District: Kahrizak

Population (2006)
  - Total: 26
- Time zone: UTC+3:30 (IRST)
  - Summer (DST): UTC+4:30 (IRDT)

Khurain (Persian: خورايين, also Romanized as Khūrā’īn and Khowrā‘īn; also known as Khvor'īn and Qal‘eh Khvor’īn) is a village in Kahrizak Rural District, Kahrizak District, Ray County, Tehran Province, Iran. At the 2006 census, its population was 26, in 5 families.
