= Dohtuheh-ye Olya =

Dohtuheh-ye Olya ده توهه عليا
- Village
- Location within Iran
- Coordinates: 35°27′06″N 51°24′06″E
- Country: Iran
- Province: Tehran
- County: Rey
- Bakhsh: Kahrizak
- Rural District: Kahrizak

Population (2006)
  - Total: 126
- Time zone: UTC+3:30 (IRST)
  - Summer (DST): UTC+4:30 (IRDT)

Dohtuheh-ye Olya (Persian: ده توهه عليا, also Romanized as Dohtūheh-ye ‘Olyā and Dūtūyeh-ye ‘Olyā; also known as Dowpūyeh-ye Bālā, Do Tūyeh-ye Bālā, Dotūyeh-ye Bālā, and Dūtuyeh Bāla) is a village in Kahrizak Rural District, Kahrizak District, Ray County, Tehran Province, Iran. At the 2006 census, its population was 126, in 31 families.
