= Alian, Tehran =

Village in Tehran province, Iran

Alian Persian: عليان
- Village
- Country: Iran
- Province: Tehran
- County: Ray
- District: Central
- Rural District: Azimiyeh

Population (2016)
  - Total: 87
- Time zone: UTC+3:30 (IRST)

Alian (Persian: عليان) (Note: Also romanized as ʿAlīān) is a village in Azimiyeh Rural District of the Central District in Ray County, Tehran province, Iran.

== Demographics ==
=== Population ===
At the time of the 2006 National Census, the village's population was 271 in 65 households. The following census in 2011 counted 159 people in 45 households. The 2016 census measured the population of the village as 87 people in 27 households.
