= Qaleh-ye Now Chaman Zamin =

Village in Tehran province, Iran

Qaleh-ye Now Chaman Zamin Persian: قلعه نوچمن زمين
- Village
- Location within Iran
- Coordinates: 35°29′13″N 51°22′08″E
- Country: Iran
- Province: Tehran
- County: Ray
- District: Kahrizak
- Rural District: Kahrizak

Population (2016)
  - Total: 1,331
- Time zone: UTC+3:30 (IRST)

Qaleh-ye Now Chaman Zamin (Persian: قلعه نوچمن زمين) (Note: Also romanized as Qal‘eh-ye Now Chaman Zamīn; also known as Qal‘eh Nau, Qal‘eh Now, Qal‘eh Now-e Chaman, and Qal‘eh-ye Now) is a village in Kahrizak Rural District of Kahrizak District in Ray County, Tehran province, Iran.

== Demographics ==
=== Population ===
At the time of the 2006 National Census, the village's population was 442 in 106 households. The following census in 2011 counted 1,064 people in 164 households. The 2016 census measured the population of the village as 1,331 people in 229 households.
