= Vijin-e Pain =

Village in Tehran province, Iran

Vijin-e Pain Persian: ويجين پائين
- Village
- Location within Iran
- Country: Iran
- Province: Tehran
- County: Ray
- District: Fashapuyeh
- Rural District: Hasanabad

Population (2016)
  - Total: 60
- Time zone: UTC+3:30 (IRST)

Vijin-e Pain (Persian: ويجين پائين) (Note: Also romanized as Vījīn-e Pā’īn; also known as Vījīn) is a village in Hasanabad Rural District of Fashapuyeh District in Ray County, Tehran province, Iran.

== Demographics ==
=== Population ===
At the time of the 2006 National Census, the village's population was 114 in 28 households. The following census in 2011 counted 196 people in 66 households. The 2016 census measured the population of the village as 60 people in 20 households.
