= Qaleh-ye Azimabad =

Village in Tehran province, Iran

Qaleh-ye Azimabad Persian: قلعه عظيم آباد
- Village
- Location within Iran
- Coordinates: 35°36′29″N 51°24′46″E
- Country: Iran
- Province: Tehran
- County: Ray
- District: Central
- Rural District: Azimiyeh

Population (2016)
  - Total: 1,910
- Time zone: UTC+3:30 (IRST)

Qaleh-ye Azimabad (Persian: قلعه عظيم آباد) (Note: Also romanized as Qal‘eh-ye ‘Az̧īmābād; also known as ‘Az̧īmābād and Azīmābād) is a village in Azimiyeh Rural District of the Central District in Ray County, Tehran province, Iran.

== Demographics ==
=== Population ===
At the time of the 2006 National Census, the village's population was 4,073 in 987 households. The following census in 2011 counted 2,178 people in 604 households. The 2016 census measured the population of the village as 1,910 people in 611 households.
