= Dutuheh-ye Sofla =

Village in Tehran province, Iran

Dutuheh-ye Sofla Persian: دوتوهه سفلی
- Village
- Location within Iran
- Coordinates: 35°25′25″N 51°26′06″E
- Country: Iran
- Province: Tehran
- County: Ray
- District: Kahrizak
- Rural District: Kahrizak

Population (2016)
  - Total: 1,152
- Time zone: UTC+3:30 (IRST)

Dutuheh-ye Sofla (Persian: دوتوهه سفلی) (Note: Also romanized as Dūtūheh-ye Soflá; also known as Do Tūyeh, Do Tūyeh-ye Pā’īn, Dotūyeh-ye Pā’īn, Dowpūyeh-ye Pā’īn, Dūtuyeh Pāīn, and Dūtūyeh-ye Soflá) is a village in Kahrizak Rural District of Kahrizak District in Ray County, Tehran province, Iran.

== Demographics ==
=== Population ===
At the time of the 2006 National Census, the village's population was 867 in 212 households. The following census in 2011 counted 1,130 people in 300 households. The 2016 census measured the population of the village as 1,152 people in 323 households.
