= Ray County =

Ray County may refer to:

- Ray County, Iran
- Ray County, Missouri, U.S.

== See also ==
- Rhea County, Tennessee, U.S.
