= Koleyn, Tehran =

Village in Tehran province, Iran

Koleyn Persian: كلين
- Village
- Location within Iran
- Coordinates: 35°20′24″N 51°17′55″E
- Country: Iran
- Province: Tehran
- County: Ray
- District: Fashapuyeh
- Rural District: Koleyn

Population (2016)
  - Total: 433
- Time zone: UTC+3:30 (IRST)

Koleyn (Persian: كلين) (Note: Also romanized as Kolīn; also known as Kūlīn) is a village in, and the capital of, Koleyn Rural District in Fashapuyeh District of Ray County, Tehran province, Iran.

== Demographics ==
=== Population ===
At the time of the 2006 National Census, the village's population was 480 in 130 households. The following census in 2011 counted 534 people in 158 households. The 2016 census measured the population of the village as 433 people in 126 households.
