= Vijin-e Bala =

Village in Tehran province, Iran

Vijin-e Bala Persian: ويجين بالا
- Village
- Location within Iran
- Country: Iran
- Province: Tehran
- County: Ray
- District: Fashapuyeh
- Rural District: Hasanabad

Population (2016)
  - Total: 717
- Time zone: UTC+3:30 (IRST)

Vijin-e Bala (Persian: ويجين بالا) (Note: Also romanized as Vījīn-e Bālā; also known as Vījīn and Vābajīn) is a village in Hasanabad Rural District of Fashapuyeh District in Ray County, Tehran province, Iran.

== Demographics ==
=== Population ===
At the time of the 2006 National Census, the village's population was 777 in 179 households. The following census in 2011 counted 1,056 people in 270 households. The 2016 census measured the population of the village as 717 people in 180 households.
