= Qaleh-ye Now-e Fashapuyeh =

Village in Tehran province, Iran

Qaleh-ye Now-e Fashapuyeh Persian: قلعه نوفشاپويه
- Village
- Country: Iran
- Province: Tehran
- County: Ray
- District: Fashapuyeh
- Rural District: Hasanabad

Population (2016)
  - Total: 176
- Time zone: UTC+3:30 (IRST)

Qaleh-ye Now-e Fashapuyeh (Persian: قلعه نوفشاپويه) (Note: Also romanized as Qal‘eh-ye Now-e Fashāpūyeh) is a village in Hasanabad Rural District of Fashapuyeh District in Ray County, Tehran province, Iran.

== Demographics ==
=== Population ===
At the time of the 2006 National Census, the village's population was 386 in 94 households. The following census in 2011 counted 361 people in 99 households. The 2016 census measured the population of the village as 176 people in 46 households.
