= Ghaniabad, Tehran =

Village in Tehran province, Iran

Ghaniabad Persian: غني اباد
- Village
- Location within Iran
- Coordinates: 35°33′55″N 51°31′08″E
- Country: Iran
- Province: Tehran
- County: Ray
- District: Central
- Rural District: Ghaniabad

Population (2016)
  - Total: 1,880
- Time zone: UTC+3:30 (IRST)

Ghaniabad (Persian: غني اباد) (Note: Also romanized as Ghanīābād; also known as Ghanīābād-e Pā’īn and Khānīābād) is a village in, and the capital of, Ghaniabad Rural District in the Central District of Ray County, Tehran province, Iran.

== Demographics ==
=== Population ===
At the time of the 2006 National Census, the village's population was 1,754 in 441 households. The following census in 2011 counted 1,558 people in 418 households. The 2016 census measured the population of the village as 1,880 people in 551 households.

== Notable people ==
- Navvab Safavi
