= Arad, Tehran =

Village in Tehran province, Iran

Arad Persian: اراد
- Village
- Location within Iran
- Coordinates: 35°20′33″N 51°20′48″E
- Country: Iran
- Province: Tehran
- County: Ray
- District: Fashapuyeh
- Rural District: Koleyn

Population (2016)
  - Total: 91
- Time zone: UTC+3:30 (IRST)

Arad (Persian: اراد) (Note: Also romanized as Ārād; also known as Arāth and Behbūdī) is a village in Koleyn Rural District of Fashapuyeh District in Ray County, Tehran province, Iran.

== Demographics ==
=== Population ===
At the time of the 2006 National Census, the village's population was 91 in 20 households. The following census in 2011 counted 79 people in 25 households. The 2016 census measured the population of the village as 91 people in 28 households.
