= Arath =

Arath may refer to the following :

== Places ==
- Arathia, an Ancient city and bishopric in Cappadocia (Asia Minor), now a Latin Catholic titular see.
- Arath, Iran, a village in Iran

== Persons ==
- Arath de la Torre (b. 1975), Mexican actor
