= Azimiyeh Rural District =

Rural district in Tehran province, Iran

Azimiyeh Rural District Persian: دهستان عظيميه
- Rural District
- Location within Iran
- Coordinates: 35°34′N 51°26′E
- Country: Iran
- Province: Tehran
- County: Ray
- District: Central
- Established: 2005
- Capital: Eslamabad

Population (2016)
  - Total: 55,564
- Time zone: UTC+3:30 (IRST)

Azimiyeh Rural District (Persian: دهستان عظيميه) is in the Central District of Ray County, Tehran province, Iran. Its capital is the village of Eslamabad.

== Demographics ==
=== Population ===
At the time of the 2006 National Census, the rural district's population was 65,133 in 16,201 households. There were 61,810 inhabitants in 17,325 households at the following census of 2011. The 2016 census measured the population of the rural district as 55,564 in 16,505 households. The most populous of its 13 villages was Alayin, with 21,594 people.

=== Other villages in the rural district ===
- Abbasabad
- Alian
- Andarman
- Beheshti
- Dowlatabad-e Qeysariyeh
- Emad Avar
- Fathabad
- Qaleh-ye Azimabad
- Salehabad-e Sharqi
- Valiabad
