= Khavaran-e Sharqi Rural District =

Rural district in Tehran province, Iran

Khavaran-e Sharqi Rural District Persian: دهستان خاوران شرقی
- Rural District
- Location within Iran
- Coordinates: 35°34′N 51°38′E
- Country: Iran
- Province: Tehran
- County: Ray
- District: Khavaran
- Established: 2009
- Capital: Qiamdasht

Population (2016)
  - Total: 39,346
- Time zone: UTC+3:30 (IRST)

Khavaran-e Sharqi Rural District (Persian: دهستان خاوران شرقی) is in Khavaran District of Ray County, Tehran province, Iran. Its capital is the village of Qiamdasht.

== History ==
In 2009, villages were separated from the Central District in the formation of Khavaran District, and Khavaran-e Sharqi Rural District was created in the new district.

== Demographics ==
=== Population ===
At the time of the 2011 National Census, the rural district's population was 40,402 inhabitants in 11,069 households. The 2016 census measured the population of the rural district as 39,346 in 11,352 households. The most populous of its four villages was Qiamdasht, with 36,446 people.

=== Other villages in the rural district ===
- Chehel Qez va Siah Darreh
- Sang Tarashan
- Tutak
