= Hasanabad Rural District (Ray County) =

Rural district in Tehran province, Iran

Hasanabad Rural District Persian: دهستان حسن آباد
- Rural District
- Location within Iran
- Coordinates: 35°20′N 51°05′E
- Country: Iran
- Province: Tehran
- County: Ray
- District: Fashapuyeh

Population (2016)
  - Total: 2,777
- Time zone: UTC+3:30 (IRST)

Hasanabad Rural District (Persian: دهستان حسن آباد) is in Fashapuyeh District of Ray County, Tehran province, Iran.

== Demographics ==
=== Population ===
At the time of the 2006 National Census, the rural district's population was 5,033 in 1,390 households. There were 4,909 inhabitants in 1,584 households at the following census of 2011. The 2016 census measured the population of the rural district as 2,777 in 903 households. The most populous of its 18 villages was Shamsabad, with 1,464 people.

=== Other villages in the rural district ===
- Kenar Gerd-e Pain
- Qaleh-ye Mohammad Ali Khan
- Qaleh-ye Now-e Fashapuyeh
- Salmanabad, Fashapuyeh
- Vijin-e Bala
- Vijin-e Pain
