= Khurin =

Khurin or Khowrin or Khorin or Khvorin (Persian: خورين) may refer to:

- Khvorin, Kermanshah
- Khvorin, Tehran
- Khurin, Damavand, Tehran Province
- Khurin, Varamin, Tehran Province
