= Kahrizak =

City in Tehran province, Iran

Kahrizak Persian: كهريزک
- City
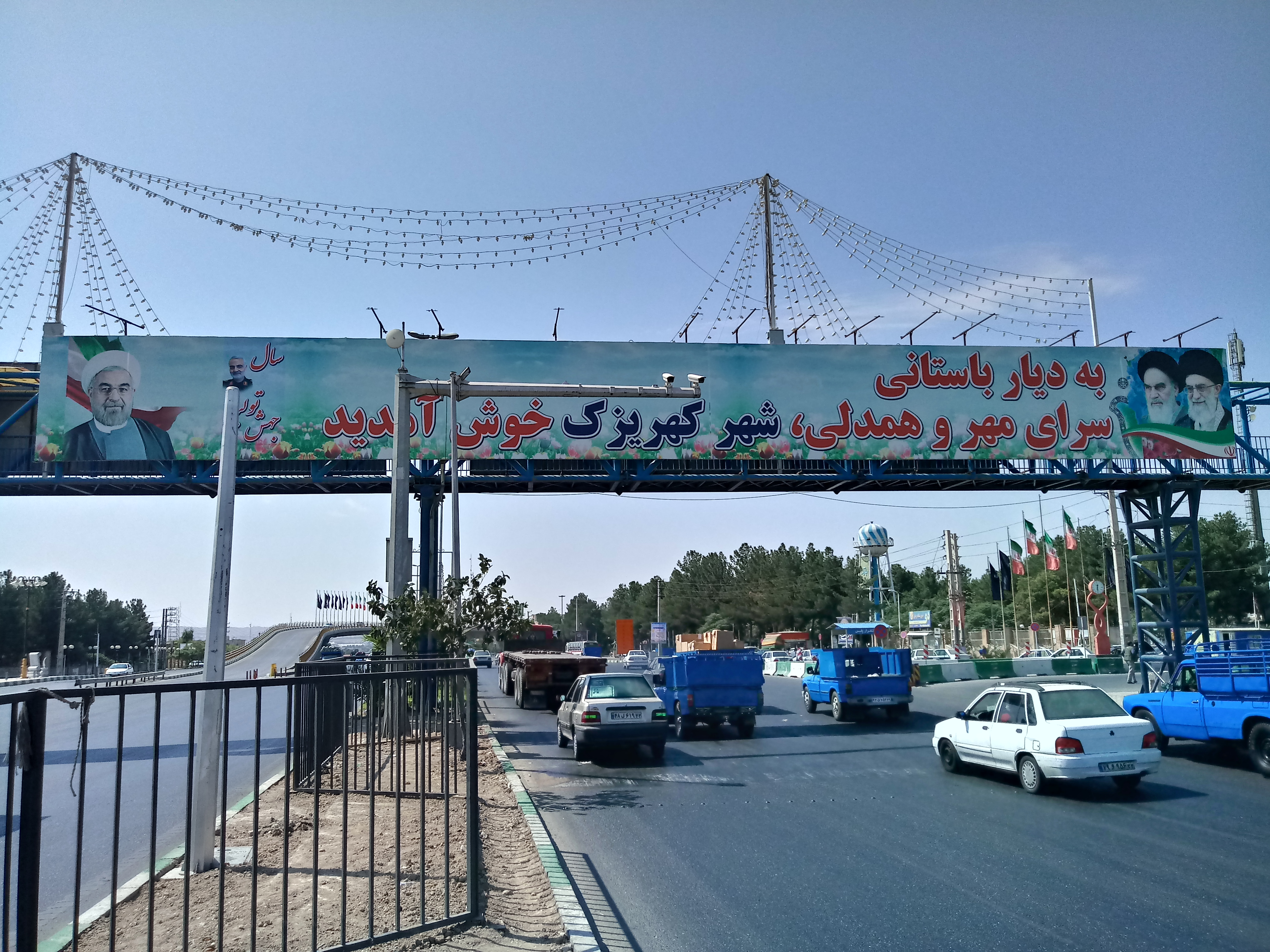
- Kahrizak welcome sign

- Location within Iran
- Coordinates: 35°31′01″N 51°21′37″E
- Country: Iran
- Province: Tehran
- County: Ray
- District: Kahrizak

Population (2016)
  - Total: 37,527
- Time zone: UTC+3:30 (IRST)

Kahrizak (Persian: كهريزک (Note: Also romanized as Kahrīzak; also known as Kahrīzak-e Ghār) is a city in, and the capital of, Kahrizak District in Ray County, Tehran province, Iran. It also serves as the administrative center for Kahrizak Rural District.

== History ==
In 2023, the city of Kahrizak annexed the villages of Abdolabad-e Gardaneh, Hamzehabad, Hoseynabad-e Gardaneh, Mehdiabad, Mohammadabad-e Amin, Qaleh Sangi, Qaleh Sheykh, Qasemabad-e Shurabad, Sadeqabad, Shahrak-e Emam Hasan-e Mojtaba, and Tabain.

== Demographics ==
=== Population ===
At the time of the 2006 National Census, the city's population was 8,704 in 2,178 households. The following census in 2011 counted 13,095 people in 2,925 households. The 2016 census measured the population of the city as 37,527 people in 10,701 households.

== Overview ==
The city is known as one of the oldest residential areas in Iran. There are few historical monuments in Kahrizak from its ancient history, A part of the buildings of the sugar factory and two summer residences of Fakhr al-Doleh Qajar are still standing.

== See also ==
Kahrizak detention center
