= Navvab Safavi =

Iranian cleric (1924–1956)

- نواب صفوی
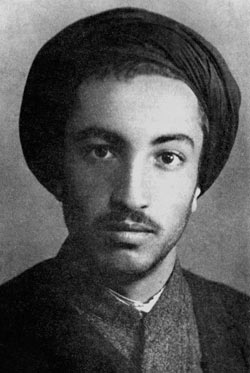

Personal life
- Born: Mojtaba Mir-Lohi; 9 October 1924 Ghaniabad, Qajar Iran
- Died: 18 January 1956 (aged 31) Tehran, Pahlavi Iran
- Cause of death: Execution by firing squad
- Political party: Fada'iyan-e Islam
- Education: Hawza of Najaf
- Occupation: Cleric

Religious life
- Religion: Islam
- Denomination: Twelver Shi'a
- Jurisprudence: Ja'fari
- Creed: Usuli

Mojtaba Mir-Lohi (Persian: مجتبی میرلوحی, 9 October 1924 – 18 January 1956), better known as Navvab Safavi (Persian: نواب صفوی), was an Iranian Twelver Shi'i cleric and dissident who founded the Fada'iyan-e Islam group. He played a role in assassinations of Iranian prime ministers Abdolhossein Hazhir, Haj Ali Razmara and intellectual Ahmad Kasravi. On 17 November 1955, after an unsuccessful attempt to assassinate the prime minister of Iran, Hossein Ala', Safavi and some of his followers were arrested. In January 1956, Safavi and three other members of Fada'iyan-e Islam were sentenced to death and executed.

== Early life ==
Born in Ghaniabad, south of Tehran into a well-known religious family on 9 October 1924, he received his primary education in Tehran and left school after eighth grade when his father died. His father, Javad Mir-Lohi, was a cleric who spent many years in jail for having slapped Reza Shah's minister of justice, Ali Akbar Davar, in the face, and thus the young Navvab was raised by his maternal uncle, Mahmood Navvab Safavi, whose name he eventually adopted. It was said that "the family name was changed to Navvab Safavi (deputies of the Safavids) to identify with the famous Shi'ite dynasty of the Safavids, who made Shi'ism the state religion of Iran in sixteenth century." Seyed Mojtaba entered Hakim Nezami Primary School at the age of 7 and then continued his education at the German Industrial School. At the same time, he was studying religious lessons in one of the mosques in Khani Abad. After Reza Shah abdicated and left the country, he turned to political activities. He staged a demonstration against the prohibition of hijab in the same school when he was not more than 18 years old. It was his first struggle against the Pahlavi government.

Growing up during this period of militant secularization, after working in Abadan's petroleum installations in Khuzestan Province for a few months for the British-owned Iranian Oil Company. A British oil company expert severely confronted one of the workers, after which Navvab provoked the workers to protest and carry out retaliation. The protests were suppressed with the intervention of police and military forces. Navvab also escaped and left Abadan for Basra and then Najaf in Iraq by boat at night. He decided, to pursue religious studies at Najaf in 1943. Mojtaba stayed at the Ghavam School in Najaf and from the very first days began a friendship and close relationship with Abdul Hosein Amini, who had established a library in one of the upper rooms of the school and was writing his famous work, Al-Ghadir.

He learned jurisprudence, principles and interpretation from masters such as Abdolhossein Amini, Hossein Qomi and Agha Sheikh Mohammad Tehrani. He is said to have been known for his striking looks and his "mesmerizing" speaking ability, and compared his own charisma and magnetism over the masses to that of Hasan-i Sabbah, the leader of the Assassins.

== Career ==
Safavi founded the Fada'iyan-e Islam organization in 1945, and began recruiting like-minded individuals. Like the Muslim Brotherhood, a group he was in deep connection with and even met Sayyid Qutb later in 1953. Navvab Safavi believed that Islamic society needed to be purified. To this end, he organized carefully planned assassinations of politicians and people related to them.

Amir Taheri claims that Safavi was "the man who introduced Khomeini to the Muslim Brotherhood and their ideas," who "spent long hours together" with Khomeini in discussion, and visited him in Qom on a number of occasions during 1943 and 1944.

He and his organization were responsible for the attempted and actual assassinations of politicians Abdolhossein Hazhir, Hossein Ala' (he survived the attempt), Prime Minister Haj Ali Razmara, and historian Ahmad Kasravi.

Safavi and his group were closely associated with Abol-Ghasem Kashani and supported but were not members of Mohammad Mosaddegh's National Front. Safavi worked with Kashani, helping organize bazaar strikes against Premier Ahmad Qavam, public meetings in support of Palestinian Arabs, and a violent demonstration in 1948 against Premier Abdolhossein Hazhir. When the Shah appointed National Front leader Mohammed Mossadegh to the post of prime minister, Safavi expected his objectives would be furthered. He demanded the government drive the British out, and that it release "with honour and respect" the assassination of Razmara. When that didn't happen, Safavi announced "we have broken away irrevocably from Kashani's National Front. They promised to set up an Islamic country according to the precepts of the Koran. Instead, they have imprisoned our brothers." He later warned, "there are others who must be pushed down the incline to hell", words which would pass on to Mossadegh and further alienate him.

Thus relations between Kashani and Safavi, not to mention Mosaddegh, became "strained". On 10 May 1951, Navvab Safavi declared, "I invite Mosaddegh, other members of the National Front and Ayatollah Kashani, to an ethical trial.

Under the Pahlavi Monarchy, the Usuli idea of democracy was suppressed and Shia Islamism found the space for revival. In 1950, at 26 years of age, he presented his idea of an Islamic State in a treatise, Barnameh-ye Inqalabi-ye Fada'ian-i Islam, which reflects his simplistic and naïve understanding of politics, history and society. After the 1953 coup against Iran's prime minister Mohammad Mosaddegh , Navvab Safavi congratulated the Shah and said:

The country was saved by Islam and with the power of faith . . . The Shah and prime minister and ministers have to be believers in and promoters of, shi'ism, and the laws that are in opposition to the divine laws of God . . . must be nullified . . . The intoxicants, the shameful exposure and carelessness of women, and sexually provocative music . . . must be done away with and the superior teachings of Islam . . . must replace them. With the implementation of Islam's superior economic plan, the deprivation of the Muslim people of Iran, and the dangerous class difference would end.

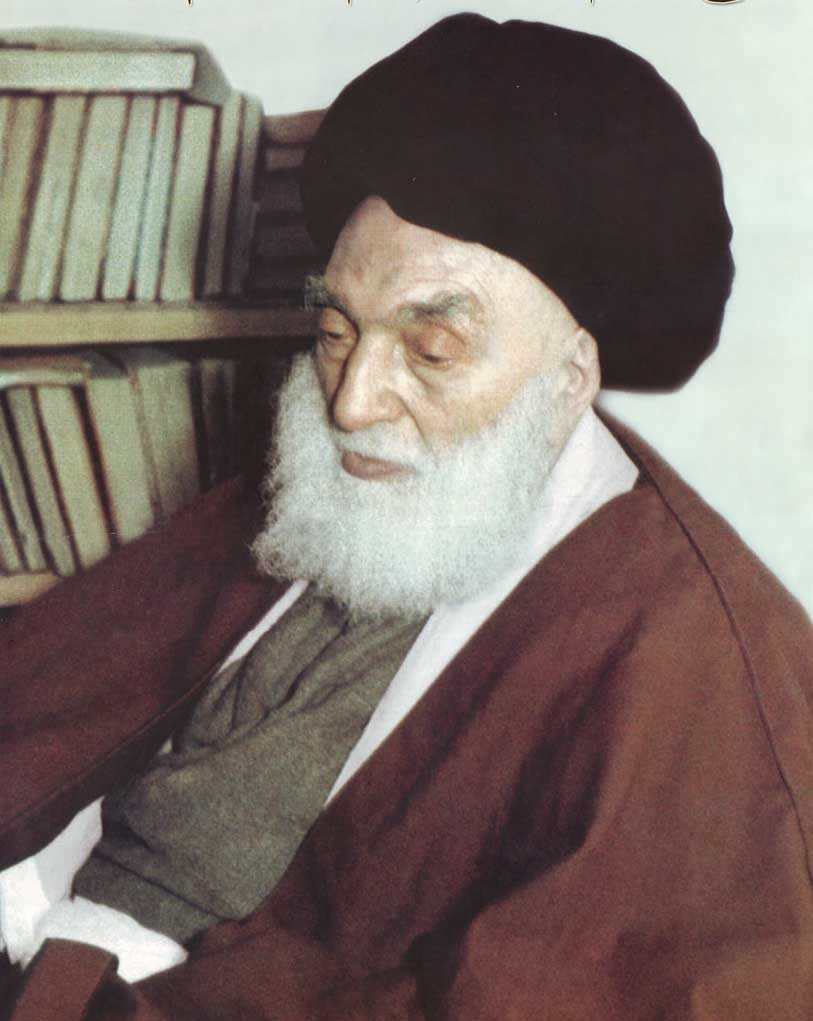
Ayatollah Sayyid Hossein Ali Tababataei Borujerdi (Persian: آیت الله العظمی سید حسین طباطبایی بروجردی; March 1875 – 30 March 1961) was a student of Akhund Khurasani and leading Iranian Shia Marja' in Iran from approximately 1947 to his death in 1961.

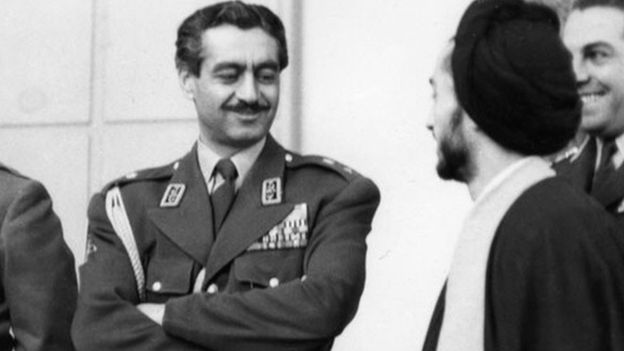
Sayyid Mojtaba Mir-Lohi, known as Navvab Safavi under arrest. He played a role in assassinations of Abdolhossein Hazhir, Haj Ali Razmara and Ahmad Kasravi. On 22 November 1955, after an unsuccessful attempt to assassinate Hosein Ala', Navvab Safavi and some of his followers were arrested. In January 1956, he was sentenced to death and executed.

In the years to follow, he enjoyed a close association with the government. In 1954, he attended the Islamic Conference in Jordan and traveled to Egypt. There he learned about Hasan al-Banna, the founder of Muslim Brotherhood (Arabic: الإخوان المسلمين), who was killed by Egyptian government in 1949, and met Sayyid Qutb. Grand Ayatullah Husayn Burujardi rejected the ideas of Navvab Safavi and his radical group. He questioned him about the robberies that his organization committed at gunpoint, Safavi replied:

Our intention is to borrow from people. What we take is for establishing a government based on the model of Imam Ali's government. Our goal is sacred and prior to these tools. When we established an Aliid government-like state, then we give people their money back.

Navvab Safavi didn't like Burujardi's idea of Shia-Sunni rapprochement (Persian: تقریب); he advocated Shia-Sunni unification (Persian: وحدت) under an Islamist agenda. Fada'ian-e Islam launched a campaign of character assassination against the Grand Ayatollah. He called for excommunication of Borujerdi and the defrocking of religious scholars who opposed Shi'i Islamism, a practice realized after establishment of the Islamic Republic of Iran for Ayatullah Mohammad Kazem Shariatmadari and other clerics through Special Clerical Court. Fada'ian-e Islam carried out assassinations of Abdolhossein Hazhir, Haj Ali Razmara and Ahmad Kasravi.

== Arrest and execution ==
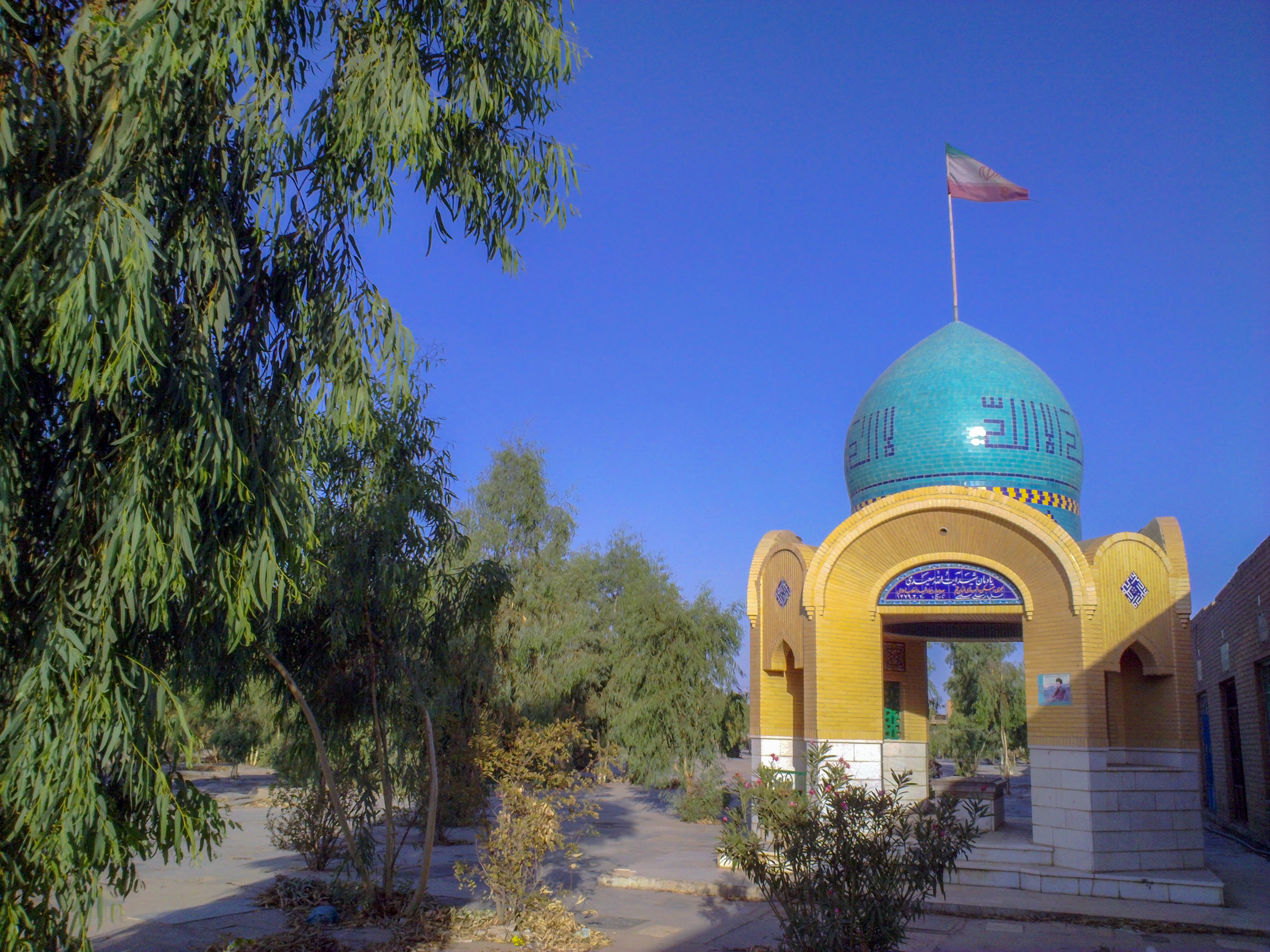
Mausoleum of Navvab Safavi in Qom cemetery.

On 23 November 1955, after an unsuccessful attempt to assassinate Hosein Ala' (17 November), Navvab Safavi was arrested and sentenced to death on 25 December 1955 under terrorism charges, along with three other comrades, by the same military court that ordered the execution of communists. The organization dispersed but after the death of Ayatullah Borujerdi, the Fada'ian-e Islam sympathizers found a new leader in Ayatullah Khomeini who appeared on the political horizon through the June 1963 riots. In 1965, prime minister Hassan Ali Mansur was assassinated by the group.

== Ideology ==
The main work detailing his vision of the world is Barnameh-ye Enqelabi-ye Fada'ian-e Eslam (The Revolutionary Programme of Fada'ian-e Eslam), "published in October/November 1950, in the heat of the debates over the nationalization of the oil industry", where he exposes a paradigm close to that of the utopian socialists like Saint-Simon, Charles Fourier or Robert Owen.

=== Philosophy ===
In philosophy and moral psychology, he proposed that "the human mind is the arena of a continual confrontation between the desires of the psyche (nafs) and the restraining force of reason ('aql)", and the latter should refrain the carnal desires of the former, like fornication or drinking alcohol.

=== Education ===
In education, he favoured "compulsory elementary education for five years, and high school would train students in the areas of students' specialization. Only courses such as chemistry, physics, natural sciences, mathematics, and medicine, which are useful for society, would be taught" so "in this way those students who do not make it to college would have learned a trade when they complete high school", while he also promoted single-sex education, all of which would influence the educational policies of Ayatollah Khomeini.

=== Economy ===
In economy, he proposed a Third Position, rejecting both western capitalism and communism for an Islamic vision, which is similar to Ayatollah Khomeini's anti-Soviet and anti-US position. His ideology has been characterized as "a Sismondian capitalism of shopkeepers and artisans where altruism, charity, and religious taxes (zakat and khoms) act as levelling devices in a society that would honour everyone equally and would provide for all their needs", "the shopkeepers and artisans would be living in a world of total harmony with the wealthy and fortunate merchants, while the corrupt and arrogant capitalist thieves and embezzlers of public funds would be done away with", whereas the government "would carry on certain responsibilities. It would maintain law and order and would make sure that Islamic codes of conduct are strictly enforced. It would educate the youth (public education by government is accepted) and carry out other social responsibilities."

=== Geopolitics ===
In geopolitics, like many Iranian nationalists of his time, he's particularly critical of Great Britain and the Soviet Union, yet another feature Ayatollah Khomeini made his own. He was also strongly anti-Zionist, proclaiming that "the pure blood of the brave devotees of Islam is boiling to help the Moslem Palestinian brothers." In fact, apart from the obvious pan-Islamic tones of the movement, he was also somehow a nationalist in the sense that "the Fada'iyan's ideology combined religious zeal and belief in the supremacy of Shi'ite Islam with elements of Iranian nationalism. The Fada'iyan sought to 'purify the Persian language' and hoped to bring the Iranian-Shi'ite lands together and establish an Islamic government."

Unlike the later founder of the Islamic Republic, Navvab never advocated for a theocracy, or condemned monarchy. He believed the Shah should be

"viewed as the father of the family. He should be benevolent and fatherly in ruling the people. His faith and virtues should be such that people learn from him religious faith and virtues. He, as a father, should know how everyone is doing and that no one will go hungry or lack clothing. Then, 'as long as there is anyone alive in the family no one would dare to be disrespectful toward him, not to mention wanting to expel him from his home and family. Yes! The Shah must be a father, to be a father and the Shah.'".

== Legacy ==
Apart from Ayatollah Khomeini, Navvab's vision would influence many other important players of the Islamic Republic, for instance the scholar Morteza Motahhari, or being, with Jalal Al-e-Ahmad and Ahmad Fardid, one of the main ideological pillars of the former conservative president of Iran, Mahmoud Ahmadinejad. The former Supreme Leader of Iran, Ali Khamenei, went as far as saying "I have no doubt that it was Navab Safavi who first kindled the fire of revolutionary Islam in my heart." Khamenei also named his second-born son (Mojtaba Khamenei, the third Supreme Leader of Iran) after Navvab.

== See also ==
- Fada'iyan-e Islam

== Sources ==
- Behdad, Sohrab (January 1997). "Islamic Utopia in Pre-Revolutionary Iran: Navvab Safavi and the Fada'ian-e Eslam". Middle Eastern Studies. 33 (1): 40–65. doi:10.1080/00263209708701141. JSTOR 4283846.
- Bohdan, Siarhei (August 2020). "'They Were Going Together with the Ikhwan': The Influence of Muslim Brotherhood Thinkers on Shi'i Islamists during the Cold War". The Middle East Journal. 74 (2): 243–262. doi:10.3751/74.2.14.
- Khalaji, Mehdi (27 November 2009). "The Dilemmas of Pan-Islamic Unity". Current Trends in Islamist Ideology. 9: 64–79.
