= Khavaran-e Gharbi Rural District =

Rural district in Tehran province, Iran

Khavaran-e Gharbi Rural District Persian: دهستان خاوران غربی
- Rural District
- Location within Iran
- Coordinates: 35°34′N 51°34′E
- Country: Iran
- Province: Tehran
- County: Ray
- District: Khavaran
- Established: 2009
- Capital: Qasemabad-e Tehranchi

Population (2016)
  - Total: 7,419
- Time zone: UTC+3:30 (IRST)

Khavaran-e Gharbi Rural District (Persian: دهستان خاوران غربی) is a rural district located in Khavaran District of Ray County, Tehran province, Iran. Its capital is the village of Qasemabad-e Tehranchi.

== History ==
In 2009, villages were separated from the Central District in the formation of Khavaran District, and Khavaran-e Gharbi Rural District was created in the new district.

== Demographics ==
=== Population ===
At the time of the 2011 National Census, the rural district's population was 7,409 inhabitants in 1,954 households. The 2016 census measured the population of the rural district as 7,419 in 2,103 households. The most populous of its five villages was Qasemabad-e Tehranchi, with 2,645 people.

=== Other villages in the rural district ===
- Abbasabad-e Alaqband
- Lappeh Zanak
- Mahmudabad
