= Qaleh Now-e Khaleseh, Tehran =

City in Tehran province, Iran

Qaleh Now-e Khaleseh Persian: قلعه نو خالصه
- City
- Location within Iran
- Coordinates: 35°30′44″N 51°30′58″E
- Country: Iran
- Province: Tehran
- County: Ray
- District: Qaleh Now
- Established as a city: 2018

Population (2016)
  - Total: 5,352
- Time zone: UTC+3:30 (IRST)

Qaleh Now-e Khaleseh (Persian: قلعه نوخالصه) (Note: Also romanized as Qal‘eh Now-e Khāleṣeh; also known as Qal‘eh Now, Qal‘eh Now-e Ghār, and Qal‘eh-ye Nowghār) is a city in, and the capital of, Qaleh Now District in Ray County, Tehran province, Iran. It also serves as the administrative center for Qaleh Now Rural District.

== Demographics ==
=== Population ===
At the time of the 2006 National Census, Qaleh Now-e Khaleseh's population was 4,718 in 1,195 households, when it was a village in Qaleh Now Rural District of Kahrizak District. The following census in 2011 counted 5,289 people in 1,476 households. The 2016 census measured the population of the village as 5,352 people in 1,584 households, by which time the rural district had been separated from the district in the formation of Qaleh Now District.

In 2018, the village of Qaleh Now-e Khaleseh was elevated to the status of a city.
