= Hasanabad, Iran =

City in Tehran province, Iran

Hasanabad Persian: حسن آباد
- City
- Location within Iran
- Coordinates: 35°22′09″N 51°14′25″E
- Country: Iran
- Province: Tehran
- County: Ray
- District: Fashapuyeh

Population (2016)
  - Total: 43,922
- Time zone: UTC+3:30 (IRST)

Hasanabad (Persian: حسن آباد) (Note: Also romanized as Hasanâbâd; also known as Hasanābād-e Fashāfūyeh) is a city in, and the capital of, Fashapuyeh District in Ray County, Tehran province, Iran.

== Demographics ==
=== Population ===
At the time of the 2006 National Census, the city's population was 20,451 in 4,993 households. The following census in 2011 counted 27,859 people in 7,415 households. The 2016 census measured the population of the city as 43,922 people in 12,316 households.
