= Qaleh Now, Bid Zard =

Qaleh Now قلعه نو
- Village
- Country: Iran
- Province: Fars
- County: Shiraz
- Bakhsh: Central
- Rural District: Bid Zard

Population (2006)
  - Total: 170
- Time zone: UTC+3:30 (IRST)
  - Summer (DST): UTC+4:30 (IRDT)

Qaleh Now (Persian: قلعه نو, also Romanized as Qal`eh Now) is a village in Bid Zard Rural District, in the Central District of Shiraz County, Fars province, Iran. At the 2006 census, its population was 170, in 37 families.
