= Qaleh Now, Sepidan =

Qaleh Now قلعه نو
- Village
- Location within Iran
- Coordinates: 29°59′39″N 52°24′46″E
- Country: Iran
- Province: Fars
- County: Sepidan
- Bakhsh: Beyza
- Rural District: Beyza

Population (2006)
  - Total: 475
- Time zone: UTC+3:30 (IRST)
  - Summer (DST): UTC+4:30 (IRDT)

Qaleh Now (Persian: قلعه نو, also Romanized as Qal‘eh Now) is a village in Beyza Rural District, Beyza District, Sepidan County, Fars province, Iran. At the 2006 census, its population was 475, in 122 families.
