= Qaleh-ye Now, Marvdasht =

Qaleh-ye Now قلعه نو
- Village
- Location within Iran
- Coordinates: 30°11′34″N 52°38′38″E
- Country: Iran
- Province: Fars
- County: Marvdasht
- Bakhsh: Dorudzan
- Rural District: Abarj

Population (2006)
  - Total: 752
- Time zone: UTC+3:30 (IRST)
  - Summer (DST): UTC+4:30 (IRDT)

Qaleh-ye Now (Persian: قلعه نو, also Romanized as Qal‘eh Now; also known as Qal‘eh-ye Now Abraj) is a village in Abarj Rural District, Dorudzan District, Marvdasht County, Fars province, Iran. At the 2006 census, its population was 752, in 153 families.
