= Qaleh Now-ye Alireza Bek =

Qaleh Now-ye Alireza Bek قلعه نوعليرضابيك
- Village
- Location within Iran
- Coordinates: 36°07′57″N 58°55′26″E
- Country: Iran
- Province: Razavi Khorasan
- County: Nishapur
- Bakhsh: Central
- Rural District: Fazl

Population (2006)
  - Total: 234
- Time zone: UTC+3:30 (IRST)
  - Summer (DST): UTC+4:30 (IRDT)

Qaleh Now-ye Alireza Bek (Persian: قلعه نوعليرضابيك, also Romanized as Qal‘eh Now-ye ‘Alīreẕā Beyk and Qal‘eh Now-e ‘Alīreẕā Bek) is a village in Fazl Rural District, in the Central District of Nishapur County, Razavi Khorasan Province, Iran. At the 2006 census, its population was 234, in 67 families.
