= Qaleh-ye Now, Joveyn =

Qaleh-ye Now قلعه نو
- Village
- Location within Iran
- Coordinates: 36°32′25″N 57°27′04″E
- Country: Iran
- Province: Razavi Khorasan
- County: Jowayin
- Bakhsh: Central
- Rural District: Pirakuh

Population (2006)
  - Total: 25
- Time zone: UTC+3:30 (IRST)
  - Summer (DST): UTC+4:30 (IRDT)

Qaleh-ye Now (Persian: قلعه نو, also Romanized as Qal‘eh-ye Now, Qal‘eh-i-Nau, and Qal‘eh Now) is a village in Pirakuh Rural District, in the Central District of Jowayin County, Razavi Khorasan Province, Iran. At the 2006 census, its population was 25, in 8 families.
