= Azimabad, Kermanshah =

Azimabad عظيم اباد
- Village
- Location within Iran
- Coordinates: 34°42′00″N 47°50′43″E
- Country: Iran
- Province: Kermanshah
- County: Sonqor
- Bakhsh: Central
- Rural District: Parsinah

Population (2006)
  - Total: 104
- Time zone: UTC+3:30 (IRST)
  - Summer (DST): UTC+4:30 (IRDT)

Azimabad (Persian: عظيم اباد, also Romanized as ‘Az̧īmābād) is a village in Parsinah Rural District, in the Central District of Sonqor County, Kermanshah Province, Iran. At the 2006 census, its population was 104, in 24 families.
