= Moqimabad, Razavi Khorasan =

Moqimabad مقيم اباد
- Village
- Location within Iran
- Country: Iran
- Province: Razavi Khorasan
- County: Mashhad
- Bakhsh: Central
- Rural District: Tus

Population (2006)
  - Total: 92
- Time zone: UTC+3:30 (IRST)
  - Summer (DST): UTC+4:30 (IRDT)

Moqimabad (Persian: مقيم اباد, also Romanized as Moqīmābād) is a village in Tus Rural District, in the Central District of Mashhad County, Razavi Khorasan Province, Iran. At the 2006 census, its population was 92, in 23 families.
