= Qaleh Now-e Palangari =

Qaleh Now-e Palangari قلعه نوپالنگري
- Village
- Location within Iran
- Coordinates: 30°16′36″N 52°19′29″E
- Country: Iran
- Province: Fars
- County: Marvdasht
- Bakhsh: Kamfiruz
- Rural District: Kamfiruz-e Shomali

Population (2006)
  - Total: 262
- Time zone: UTC+3:30 (IRST)
  - Summer (DST): UTC+4:30 (IRDT)

Qaleh Now-e Palangari (Persian: قلعه نوپالنگري, also Romanized as Qal‘eh Now-e Pālangarī; also known as Qal‘eh Now) is a village in Kamfiruz-e Shomali Rural District, Kamfiruz District, Marvdasht County, Fars province, Iran. At the 2006 census, its population was 262, in 58 families.
