= Ghaniabad, Semnan =

Ghaniabad غني آباد
- Village
- Location within Iran
- Coordinates: 36°06′28″N 54°23′41″E
- Country: Iran
- Province: Semnan
- County: Damghan
- Bakhsh: Central
- Rural District: Howmeh

Population (2006)
  - Total: 32
- Time zone: UTC+3:30 (IRST)
  - Summer (DST): UTC+4:30 (IRDT)

Ghaniabad (Persian: غني آباد, also Romanized as Ghanīābād; also known as Qanī Ābād) is a village in Howmeh Rural District, in the Central District of Damghan County, Semnan Province, Iran. At the 2006 census, its population was 32, in 5 families.
