= Qaleh Now, Nishapur =

Village in Razavi Khorasan, Iran

Qaleh Now قلعه نو
- Village
- Location within Iran
- Coordinates: 36°08′19″N 58°49′22″E
- Country: Iran
- Province: Razavi Khorasan
- County: Nishapur
- Bakhsh: Central
- Rural District: Darbqazi

Population (2006)
  - Total: 32
- Time zone: UTC+3:30 (IRST)
  - Summer (DST): UTC+4:30 (IRDT)

Qaleh Now (Persian: قلعه نو, also Romanized as Qal`eh Now; also known as Qal‘eh Now-ye Seyyedhā, Ghilāna, Qal‘eh Now-e Chambarān, Qal‘ehnow-e Seyyedha, and Qīlāneh) is a village in Darbqazi Rural District, in the Central District of Nishapur County, Razavi Khorasan Province, Iran. At the 2006 census, its population was 32, in 8 families.
