= Qaleh Now, Hormozgan =

Qaleh Now قلعه نو
- Village
- Location within Iran
- Coordinates: 27°55′59″N 56°41′11″E
- Country: Iran
- Province: Hormozgan
- County: Hajjiabad
- Bakhsh: Ahmadi
- Rural District: Ahmadi

Population (2006)
  - Total: 29
- Time zone: UTC+3:30 (IRST)
  - Summer (DST): UTC+4:30 (IRDT)

Qaleh Now (Persian: قلعه نو, also Romanized as Qal`eh Now) is a village in Ahmadi Rural District, Ahmadi District, Hajjiabad County, Hormozgan Province, Iran. At the 2006 census, its population was 29, in 11 families.
