= Qaleh-ye Now, Jiroft =

Village in Kerman, Iran

Qaleh-ye Now قلعه نو
- Village
- Location within Iran
- Coordinates: 28°37′31″N 57°45′26″E
- Country: Iran
- Province: Kerman
- County: Jiroft
- Bakhsh: Central
- Rural District: Halil

Population (2006)
  - Total: 584
- Time zone: UTC+3:30 (IRST)
  - Summer (DST): UTC+4:30 (IRDT)

Qaleh-ye Now (Persian: قلعه نو, also Romanized as Qal‘eh-ye Now and Qal‘eh Now) is a village in Halil Rural District, in the Central District of Jiroft County, Kerman Province, Iran. At the 2006 census, its population was 584, in 130 families.
