= Gunestan =

Village in Markazi, Iran

Gunestan گونستان
- Village
- Location within Iran
- Coordinates: 34°01′49″N 48°55′06″E
- Country: Iran
- Province: Markazi
- County: Shazand
- Bakhsh: Zalian
- Rural District: Zalian

Population (2006)
  - Total: 60
- Time zone: UTC+3:30 (IRST)
  - Summer (DST): UTC+4:30 (IRDT)

Gunestan (Persian: گونستان, also Romanized as Gūnestān; also known as Gūnsebān, Qal‘eh, Qal‘eh Naū, Qal‘eh Now, Qal‘eh Now-e Gūnespān, Qal‘eh Now Gūnesbān, Qal‘eh-ye Now, and Qal‘eh-ye Now Gūnesbān) is a village in Zalian Rural District, Zalian District, Shazand County, Markazi Province, Iran. At the 2006 census, its population was 60, in 14 families.
