= Qaleh Now, Kaftarak =

Qaleh Now قلعه نو
- Village
- Location within Iran
- Coordinates: 29°33′33″N 52°38′26″E
- Country: Iran
- Province: Fars
- County: Shiraz
- Bakhsh: Central
- Rural District: Kaftarak

Population (2006)
  - Total: 3,585
- Time zone: UTC+3:30 (IRST)
  - Summer (DST): UTC+4:30 (IRDT)

Qaleh Now (Persian: قلعه نو, also Romanized as Qal’eh-ye Now) is a village in Kaftarak Rural District, in the Central District of Shiraz County, Fars province, Iran. At the 2006 census, its population was 3,585, in 894 families.
