= Qaleh Now-e Mastufi =

Qaleh Now-e Mastufi قلعه نومستوفي
- Village
- Location within Iran
- Coordinates: 35°10′45″N 59°11′44″E
- Country: Iran
- Province: Razavi Khorasan
- County: Torbat-e Heydarieh
- Bakhsh: Central
- Rural District: Pain Velayat

Population (2006)
  - Total: 89
- Time zone: UTC+3:30 (IRST)
  - Summer (DST): UTC+4:30 (IRDT)

Qaleh Now-e Mastufi (Persian: قلعه نومستوفي, also Romanized as Qal‘eh Now-e Mastūfī; also known as Qal‘eh Now) is a village in Pain Velayat Rural District, in the Central District of Torbat-e Heydarieh County, Razavi Khorasan Province, Iran. At the 2006 census, its population was 89, in 26 families.
