= Qaleh Now Shamsabad =

Qaleh Now Shamsabad قلعه نوشمس اباد
- Village
- Location within Iran
- Coordinates: 32°19′00″N 48°26′00″E
- Country: Iran
- Province: Khuzestan
- County: Dezful
- Bakhsh: Central
- Rural District: Shamsabad

Population (2006)
  - Total: 961
- Time zone: UTC+3:30 (IRST)
  - Summer (DST): UTC+4:30 (IRDT)

Qaleh Now Shamsabad (Persian: قلعه نوشمس اباد, also Romanized as Qal‘eh Now Shamsābād) is a village in Shamsabad Rural District, in the Central District of Dezful County, Khuzestan Province, Iran. In the 2006 census, its population was reported to be 961 with 229 families.
