= Qaleh Now, Shazand =

Village in Markazi, Iran

Qaleh Now قلعه نو
- Village
- Location within Iran
- Coordinates: 33°37′52″N 49°17′22″E
- Country: Iran
- Province: Markazi
- County: Shazand
- Bakhsh: Sarband
- Rural District: Hendudar

Population (2006)
  - Total: 226
- Time zone: UTC+3:30 (IRST)
  - Summer (DST): UTC+4:30 (IRDT)

Qaleh Now (Persian: قلعه نو, also Romanized as Qal`eh Now, Qal‘eh Nau, and Qal‘eh-ye Now; also known as Qal‘eh Now-ye Karīmbak, Qal‘eh Now-ye Karīm Bek, and Qal‘eh-ye Now Karīm Beyg) is a village in Hendudar Rural District, Sarband District, Shazand County, Markazi Province, Iran. At the 2006 census, its population was 226, in 50 families.
