= Qaleh Now-ye Hakim =

Qaleh Now-ye Hakim قلعه نوحكيمي
- Village
- Location within Iran
- Coordinates: 33°50′33″N 48°45′01″E
- Country: Iran
- Province: Lorestan
- County: Borujerd
- Bakhsh: Central
- Rural District: Hemmatabad

Population (2006)
  - Total: 182
- Time zone: UTC+3:30 (IRST)
  - Summer (DST): UTC+4:30 (IRDT)

Qaleh Now-ye Hakim (Persian: قلعه نوحكيمي, also Romanized as Qal‘eh Now-ye Ḩakīm and Qal‘eh Now-ye Ḩakīmī) is a village in Hemmatabad Rural District, in the Central District of Borujerd County, Lorestan Province, Iran. At the 2006 census, its population was 182, in 47 families.
