= Qaleh Now, Mamasani =

Qaleh Now قلعه نو
- Village
- Location within Iran
- Coordinates: 30°11′16″N 51°30′57″E
- Country: Iran
- Province: Fars
- County: Mamasani
- Bakhsh: Central
- Rural District: Fahlian

Population (2006)
  - Total: 183
- Time zone: UTC+3:30 (IRST)
  - Summer (DST): UTC+4:30 (IRDT)

Qaleh Now (Persian: قلعه نو, also Romanized as Qal`eh Now; also known as Qalehno) is a village in Fahlian Rural District, in the Central District of Mamasani County, Fars province, Iran. At the 2006 census, its population was 183, in 50 families.
