= Qaleh Now-e Hashivar =

Village in Fars, Iran

Qaleh Now-e Hashivar قلعه نوهشيوار
- Village
- Location within Iran
- Coordinates: 28°39′58″N 54°28′25″E
- Country: Iran
- Province: Fars
- County: Darab
- Bakhsh: Central
- Rural District: Hashivar

Population (2006)
  - Total: 172
- Time zone: UTC+3:30 (IRST)
  - Summer (DST): UTC+4:30 (IRDT)

Qaleh Now-e Hashivar (Persian: قلعه نوهشيوار, also Romanized as Qal‘eh Now-e Hashīvār; also known as Qal‘eh-i-Nau, Qal‘eh Now, and Qal‘eh-ye Now) is a village in Hashivar Rural District, in the Central District of Darab County, Fars province, Iran. At the 2006 census, its population was 172, in 32 families.
