= Aleksandr Khorin =

Russian footballer

Personal information
- Full name: Aleksandr Nikolayevich Khorin
- Date of birth: 3 May 1986 (age 40)
- Place of birth: Yeysk, Krasnodar Krai, Russian SFSR
- Height: 1.77 m (5 ft 10 in)
- Position: Defender

Senior career*
Years	Team	Apps	(Gls)
2002–2007	FC Krasnodar-2000	78	(2)
2007	FC Kuban Krasnodar	0	(0)
2008	FC Dynamo Stavropol	28	(0)
2009	FC Stavropolye-2009	11	(0)
2009	→ FC Nosta Novotroitsk (loan)	9	(0)
2010	FC Krasnodar-2000	14	(0)
2010	→ FC Dynamo Saint Petersburg (loan)	8	(0)
2011–2013	FC Gubkin	38	(0)
2013	FC Oryol	14	(0)
2014–2015	FC Torpedo Armavir	35	(0)
2015	FC Anapa		
2016	FC Kuban Holding Pavlovskaya		
2017	FC Vityaz-Memorial Starominskaya		
2017	FC Magnat Krasnodar		
2018	FC Spartak Rayevskaya		
2018–2019	FC Kuban Holding Pavlovskaya		
2019	FC Magnat Krasnodar		
- * Club domestic league appearances and goals

Aleksandr Nikolayevich Khorin (Russian: Александр Николаевич Хорин; born 3 May 1986) is a Russian former professional football player.

== Club career ==
He made his Russian Football National League debut for FC Nosta Novotroitsk on 20 August 2009 in a game against FC Volgar Astrakhan. He also played in the FNL next season for FC Dynamo Saint Petersburg.
