= Qaleh Now-e Kalateh Menar =

Village in Razavi Khorasan, Iran

Qaleh Now-e Kalateh Menar قلعه نوكلاته منار
- Village
- Location within Iran
- Coordinates: 36°02′03″N 60°11′31″E
- Country: Iran
- Province: Razavi Khorasan
- County: Mashhad
- Bakhsh: Razaviyeh
- Rural District: Pain Velayat

Population (2006)
  - Total: 99
- Time zone: UTC+3:30 (IRST)
  - Summer (DST): UTC+4:30 (IRDT)

Qaleh Now-e Kalateh Menar (Persian: قلعه نوكلاته منار, also Romanized as Qal‘eh Now-e Kalāteh Menār; also known as Qal‘eh Now-e Khārzār and Qal‘eh Now) is a village in Pain Velayat Rural District, Razaviyeh District, Mashhad County, Razavi Khorasan Province, Iran. At the 2006 census, its population was 99, in 26 families.
