= Qaleh Now, Torbat-e Heydarieh =

Qaleh Now قلعه نو
- Village
- Location within Iran
- Coordinates: 35°32′18″N 59°29′26″E
- Country: Iran
- Province: Razavi Khorasan
- County: Torbat-e Heydarieh
- Bakhsh: Jolgeh Rokh
- Rural District: Pain Rokh

Population (2006)
  - Total: 260
- Time zone: UTC+3:30 (IRST)
  - Summer (DST): UTC+4:30 (IRDT)

Qaleh Now (Persian: قلعه نو, also Romanized as Qal`eh Now) is a village in Pain Rokh Rural District, Jolgeh Rokh District, Torbat-e Heydarieh County, Razavi Khorasan Province, Iran. At the 2006 census, its population was 260, in 46 families.
