= Azimabad, Mazandaran =

Azimabad عظيم اباد
- Village
- Location within Iran
- Coordinates: 36°35′20″N 52°26′54″E
- Country: Iran
- Province: Mazandaran
- County: Amol
- Bakhsh: Dabudasht
- Rural District: Dabuy-ye Jonubi

Population (2006)
  - Total: 123
- Time zone: UTC+3:30 (IRST)
  - Summer (DST): UTC+4:30 (IRDT)

Azimabad (Persian: عظيم اباد, also Romanized as ‘Az̧īmābād and ‘Azīmābād) is a village in Dabuy-ye Jonubi Rural District, Dabudasht District, Amol County, Mazandaran Province, Iran. At the 2006 census, its population was 123, in 33 families.
