= Koleyn Rural District =

Rural district in Tehran province, Iran

Koleyn Rural District Persian: دهستان كلين
- Rural District
- Location within Iran
- Coordinates: 35°15′N 51°22′E
- Country: Iran
- Province: Tehran
- County: Ray
- District: Fashapuyeh
- Established: 2002
- Capital: Koleyn

Population (2016)
  - Total: 8,943
- Time zone: UTC+3:30 (IRST)

Koleyn Rural District (Persian: دهستان كلين) is in Fashapuyeh District of Ray County, Tehran province, Iran. Its capital is the village of Koleyn.

== Demographics ==
=== Population ===
At the time of the 2006 National Census, the rural district's population was 3,859 in 942 households. There were 5,543 inhabitants in 1,434 households at the following census of 2011. The 2016 census measured the population of the rural district as 8,943 in 1,459 households. The most populous of its 22 villages was Ebrahimabad, with 3,530 people.

=== Other villages in the rural district ===
- Arad
- Khanloq
- Khomarabad
- Qanbarabad
- Zivan
- Zolfabad
