= Ghaniabad Rural District =

Rural district in Tehran province, Iran

Ghaniabad Rural District Persian: دهستان غني آباد
- Rural District
- Location within Iran
- Coordinates: 35°35′N 51°31′E
- Country: Iran
- Province: Tehran
- County: Ray
- District: Central
- Established: 1986
- Capital: Ghaniabad

Population (2016)
  - Total: 29,013
- Time zone: UTC+3:30 (IRST)

Ghaniabad Rural District (Persian: دهستان غني آباد) is in the Central District of Ray County, Tehran province, Iran. Its capital is the village of Ghaniabad.

== Demographics ==
=== Population ===
At the time of the 2006 National Census, the rural district's population was 67,933 in 16,890 households. There were 31,196 inhabitants in 8,744 households at the following census of 2011. The 2016 census measured the population of the rural district as 29,013 in 8,559 households. The most populous of its seven villages was Khavar Shahr, with 13,203 people.

=== Other villages in the rural district ===
- Aminabad
- Eslamabad
- Taqiabad
