= Khavaran District =

District in Tehran province, Iran

Khavaran District Persian: بخش خاوران
- District
- Location within Iran
- Coordinates: 35°34′N 51°36′E
- Country: Iran
- Province: Tehran
- County: Ray
- Established: 2009
- Capital: Qiamdasht

Population (2016)
  - Total: 46,765
- Time zone: UTC+3:30 (IRST)

Khavaran District (Persian: بخش خاوران) is in Ray County, Tehran province, Iran. Its capital is the village of Qiamdasht.

== History ==
In 2009, villages were separated from the Central District in the formation of Khavaran District.

== Demographics ==
=== Population ===
At the time of the 2011 National Census, the district's population was 47,811 people in 13,023 households. The 2016 census measured the population of the district as 46,765 inhabitants in 13,455 households.

=== Administrative divisions ===
Khavaran District Population
Administrative Divisions	2011	2016
Khavaran-e Gharbi RD	7,409	7,419
Khavaran-e Sharqi RD	40,402	39,346
Total	47,811	46,765
RD = Rural District
