= Kahrizak Rural District =

Rural district in Tehran province, Iran

Kahrizak Rural District Persian: دهستان کهریزک
- Rural District
- Location within Iran
- Coordinates: 35°27′N 51°22′E
- Country: Iran
- Province: Tehran
- County: Ray
- District: Kahrizak
- Established: Established
- Founder: 1986
- Capital: Kahrizak

Population (2016)
  - Total: 21,789
- Time zone: UTC+3:30 (IRST)

Kahrizak Rural District (Persian: دهستان کهریزک) is in Kahrizak District of Ray County, Tehran province, Iran. It is administered from the city of Kahrizak.

== Demographics ==
=== Population ===
At the time of the 2006 National Census, the rural district's population was 35,213 in 8,500 households. There were 38,919 inhabitants in 9,666 households at the following census of 2011. The 2016 census measured the population of the rural district as 21,789 in 6,146 households, by which time portions of the rural district had been separated from the district in the formation of Qaleh Now District. The most populous of its 37 villages was Gol Hesar, with 6,888 people.

=== Other villages in the rural district ===
- Darsunabad
- Deh-e Now
- Dutuheh-ye Sofla
- Qaleh-ye Now Chaman Zamin
- Qamsar
- Qeysarabad
- Turquzabad
