= Qaleh Now Rural District (Ray County) =

Rural district in Tehran province, Iran

Qaleh Now Rural District Persian: دهستان قلعه نو
- Rural District
- Location within Iran
- Coordinates: 35°31′N 51°33′E
- Country: Iran
- Province: Tehran
- County: Ray
- District: Qaleh Now
- Established: 1986
- Capital: Qaleh Now-e Khaleseh

Population (2016)
  - Total: 23,710
- Time zone: UTC+3:30 (IRST)

Qaleh Now Rural District (Persian: دهستان قلعه نو) is in Qaleh Now District of Ray County, Tehran province, Iran. It is administered from the city of Qaleh Now-e Khaleseh.

== Demographics ==
=== Population ===
At the time of the 2006 National Census, the rural district's population (as a part of Kahrizak District) was 33,115 in 8,139 households. There were 29,072 inhabitants in 7,582 households at the following census of 2011. The 2016 census measured the population of the rural district as 23,710 in 3,959 households, by which time it had been separated from the district in the formation of Qaleh Now District. The most populous of its eight villages was Gol Tappeh-ye Kabir, with 10,850 people.

=== Other villages in the rural district ===
- Aliabad-e Qeysariyeh
- Karimabad-e Tehranchi
- Mojtame-e Sanati-ye Baharestan
- Shamsabad
- Talebabad
- Zamanabad
