= Qaleh Now District =

District in Tehran province, Iran

Qaleh Now District Persian: بخش قلعه نو
- District
- Location within Iran
- Coordinates: 35°28′N 51°32′E
- Country: Iran
- Province: Tehran
- County: Ray
- Established: 2012
- Capital: Qaleh Now-e Khaleseh

Population (2016)
  - Total: 38,009
- Time zone: UTC+3:30 (IRST)

Qaleh Now District (Persian: بخش قلعه نو) is in Ray County, Tehran province, Iran. Its capital is the city of Qaleh Now-e Khaleseh.

== History ==
In 2012, Qaleh Now Rural District and portions of Kahrizak Rural District were separated from Kahrizak District in the formation of Qaleh Now District.

The village of Qaleh Now-e Khaleseh was converted to a city in 2018.

== Demographics ==
=== Population ===
At the time of the 2016 census, the district's population was 38,009 inhabitants in 8,147 households.

=== Administrative divisions ===
Qaleh Now District Population
Administrative Divisions	2016
Chaleh Tarkhan RD	14,299
Qaleh Now RD	23,710
Qaleh Now-e Khaleseh (city) (Note: Became a city after the 2016 census)	
Total	38,009
RD = Rural District
