= Fashapuyeh District =

District in Tehran province, Iran

Fashapuyeh District Persian: بخش فشاپویه
- District
- Location within Iran
- Coordinates: 35°17′N 51°12′E
- Country: Iran
- Province: Tehran
- County: Ray
- Established: 1986
- Capital: Hasanabad

Population (2016)
  - Total: 55,642
- Time zone: UTC+3:30 (IRST)

Fashapuyeh District (Persian: بخش فشاپویه) is in Ray County, Tehran province, Iran. Its capital is the city of Hasanabad.

== Demographics ==
=== Population ===
At the time of the 2006 National Census, the district's population was 29,343 in 7,325 households. The following census in 2011 counted 38,311 people in 10,433 households. The 2016 census measured the population of the district as 55,642 inhabitants in 14,678 households.

=== Administrative divisions ===
Fashapuyeh District Population
Administrative Divisions	2006	2011	2016
Hasanabad RD	5,033	4,909	2,777
Koleyn RD	3,859	5,543	8,943
Hasanabad (city)	20,451	27,859	43,922
Total	29,343	38,311	55,642
RD = Rural District

== Shur Fashapuyeh River ==
The Shur River originates from Zanjan province and, after passing through Qazvin province, southwest of Tehran province and Zarandieh County, it reaches the city of Ray. The famous branches of this river are: Kherrud, Abharrud, Kordan, Surud in Zarandieh.

The long, salty river crosses the width of Ray city with a northwest-southeast direction. This river passes 6 km south of Hassan Abad Feshapoyeh and flows into the salt marsh east of the Sultan Pool lake in Qom. The Shore River flows in a part of Ray parallel to the Karaj River and to the south of it with an average distance of 10 kilometers, and with a large right-turning arc, it leaves Fashapuyeh Ray and enters Qomroud village. This river is permanent and has a length of 420 kilometers.
