= Central District (Ray County) =

District in Tehran province, Iran

Central District (Ray County) Persian: بخش مرکزی شهرستان ری
- District
- Location within Iran
- Coordinates: 35°35′N 51°29′E
- Country: Iran
- Province: Tehran
- County: Ray
- Established: 1986
- Capital: Ray

Population (2016)
  - Total: 84,577
- Time zone: UTC+3:30 (IRST)

The Central District of Ray County (Persian: بخش مرکزی شهرستان ری) is in Tehran province, Iran. Its capital is the city of Ray.

== History ==
In 2009, villages were separated from the district in the formation of Khavaran District, which was divided into Khavaran-e Gharbi and Khavaran-e Sharqi Rural Districts.

== Demographics ==
=== Population ===
At the time of the 2006 National Census, the district's population was 133,066 in 33,091 households. The following census in 2011 counted 93,006 people in 26,069 households. The 2016 census measured the population of the district as 84,577 inhabitants in 25,064 households.

=== Administrative divisions ===
Central District (Ray County) Population
Administrative Divisions	2006	2011	2016
Azimiyeh RD	65,133	61,810	55,564
Ghaniabad RD	67,933	31,196	29,013
Total	133,066	93,006	84,577
RD = Rural District
