= Kahrizak District =

District in Tehran province, Iran

Kahrizak District Persian: بخش کهریزک
- District
- Location within Iran
- Coordinates: 35°27′N 51°22′E
- Country: Iran
- Province: Tehran
- County: Ray
- Established: 1986
- Capital: Kahrizak

Population (2016)
  - Total: 124,704
- Time zone: UTC+3:30 (IRST)

Kahrizak District (Persian: بخش کهریزک) is in Ray County, Tehran province, Iran. Its capital is the city of Kahrizak.

== History ==
In 2012, Qaleh Now Rural District and portions of Kahrizak Rural District were separated from the district in the formation of Qaleh Now District.

== Demographics ==
=== Population ===
At the time of the 2006 National Census, the district's population was 129,607 in 31,295 households. The following census in 2011 counted 140,177 people in 35,934 households. The 2016 census measured the population of the district as 124,704 inhabitants in 35,649 households.

=== Administrative divisions ===
Kahrizak District Population
Administrative Divisions	2006	2011	2016
Kahrizak RD	35,213	38,919	21,789
Qaleh Now RD (Note: Transferred to Qaleh Now District)	33,115	29,072	
Baqershahr (city)	52,575	59,091	65,388
Kahrizak (city)	8,704	13,095	37,527
Total	129,607	140,177	124,704
RD = Rural District
