= Ray County, Iran =

County in Tehran province, Iran

Ray County Persian: شهرستان ری
- County
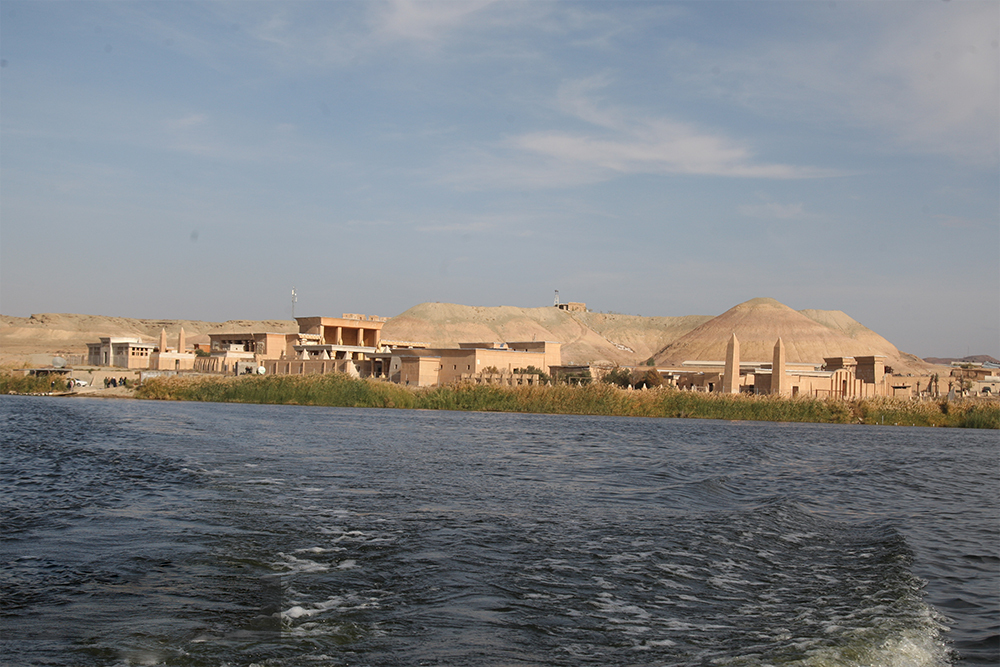
- Sacred Defense Cinema Town in Ray County

- Location of Ray County in Tehran province (bottom, purple)

- Location of Tehran province in Iran
- Coordinates: 35°22′N 51°17′E
- Country: Iran
- Province: Tehran
- Established: 1986
- Capital: Ray
- Districts: Central, Fashapuyeh, Kahrizak, Khavaran, Qaleh Now

Area
  - Total: 2,205.1 km^{2} (851.4 sq mi)

Population (2016)
  - Total: 349,700
  - Density: 158.6/km^{2} (410.7/sq mi)
- Time zone: UTC+3:30 (IRST)

Ray County (Note: According to the Iranian Chamber Society, the correct spelling of the city in both English and Persian is "Ray," (with an "a" vowel sound) though variations in spelling also exist. The city university also uses the spelling "Ray" ("Azad University, Shahr-e-Ray") as does the Encyclopædia Iranica published by Columbia University.) (Persian: شهرستان ری) is in Tehran province, Iran. Its capital is the city of Ray.

== History ==
In 2009, villages were separated from the Central District in the formation of Khavaran District, which was divided into Khavaran-e Gharbi and Khavaran-e Sharqi Rural Districts.

In 2012, Qaleh Now Rural District and portions of Kahrizak Rural District were separated from Kahrizak District in the establishment of Qaleh Now District, which was divided into two rural districts, including the new Chaleh Tarkhan Rural District. In 2018, the village of Qaleh Now-e Khaleseh was converted to a city.

== Demographics ==
=== Population ===
At the time of the 2006 National Census, the county's population was 292,016 in 71,711 households. The following census in 2011 counted 319,305 people in 85,445 households. The 2016 census measured the population of the county as 349,700 in 96,996 households.

=== Administrative divisions ===
Ray County's population history and administrative structure over three consecutive censuses are shown in the following table.

Ray County Population
| Administrative Divisions | 2006 | 2011 | 2016 |
|---|---|---|---|
| Central District | 133,066 | 93,006 | 84,577 |
| Azimiyeh RD | 65,133 | 61,810 | 55,564 |
| Ghaniabad RD | 67,933 | 31,196 | 29,013 |
| Fashapuyeh District | 29,343 | 38,311 | 55,642 |
| Hasanabad RD | 5,033 | 4,909 | 2,777 |
| Koleyn RD | 3,859 | 5,543 | 8,943 |
| Hasanabad (city) | 20,451 | 27,859 | 43,922 |
| Kahrizak District | 129,607 | 140,177 | 124,704 |
| Kahrizak RD | 35,213 | 38,919 | 21,789 |
| Qaleh Now RD | 33,115 | 29,072 | |
| Baqershahr (city) | 52,575 | 59,091 | 65,388 |
| Kahrizak (city) | 8,704 | 13,095 | 37,527 |
| Khavaran District | | 47,811 | 46,765 |
| Khavaran-e Gharbi RD | | 7,409 | 7,419 |
| Khavaran-e Sharqi RD | | 40,402 | 39,346 |
| Qaleh Now District | | | 38,009 |
| Chaleh Tarkhan RD | | | 14,299 |
| Qaleh Now RD | | | 23,710 |
| Qaleh Now-e Khaleseh (city) (Note: Became a city after the 2016 census) | | | |
| Total | 292,016 | 319,305 | 349,700 |
RD = Rural District

== Climate ==
According to the information of the State Meteorological Organization of Tehran province, the long-term average annual rainfall of Ray County is around 168.6 mm.

== See also ==
Media related to Ray County, Iran at Wikimedia Commons
