= Gol Sefid =

Gol Sefid or Gel Sefid or Gol-e Sefid or Gel-e Sefid or Gel Safid or Gelsafid (Persian: گل سفيد), also rendered as Gul-i-Safid, may refer to:

- Gel Sefid, Chaharmahal and Bakhtiari
- Gel-e Sefid, Gilan
- Gol-e Sefid, Ilam
- Gel-e Sefid, Isfahan
- Gel Sefid, Kermanshah
- Gel Sefid, Sonqor, Kermanshah Province
- Gol Sefid, Andika, Khuzestan Province
- Gol Sefid, Chelo, Andika County, Khuzestan Province
- Gol Sefid, Lorestan
- Gel-e Sefid Rural District, in Gilan Province
