= Sadat Mahalleh =

Sadat Mahalleh or Sadat Mahaleh (Persian: ساداتمحله) may refer to:

== Gilan Province ==
- Sadat Mahalleh, Ahandan, Lahijan County
- Sadat Mahalleh, Baz Kia Gurab, Lahijan County
- Sadat Mahalleh, Chaf, Langarud County
- Sadat Mahalleh, Divshal, Langarud County
- Sadat Mahalleh, Otaqvar, Langarud County
- Sadat Mahalleh, Rudsar
- Sadat Mahalleh, Sowme'eh Sara

== Mazandaran Province ==
- Sadat Mahalleh, Babol
- Sadat Mahalleh, Babolsar
- Sadat Mahalleh, Baladeh, Nur County
- Sadat Mahalleh, Chamestan, Nur County
- Sadat Mahalleh, Ramsar
- Sadat Mahalleh, Sari
- Sadat Mahalleh, Tehran
