= Darvishan Bar =

Darvishan Bar درويشانبر
- Neighborhood
- Location within Iran
- Coordinates: 37°11′34″N 50°08′05″E
- Country: Iran
- Province: Gilan
- County: Langarud
- Bakhsh: Central
- City: Langarud

Population (2006)
  - Total: 772
- Time zone: UTC+3:30 (IRST)

Darvishan Bar (Persian: درويشانبر, also Romanized as Darvīshān Bar; also known as Darvīshāneh Bar) is a neighborhood in the city of Langarud in Gilan Province, Iran.

It was formerly a village west of the city, in Divshal Rural District. At the 2006 census, its population was 772, in 222 families.
