= Pap Kiadeh =

Pap Kiadeh (Persian: پاپكياده) may refer to:

- Bala Pap Kiadeh
- Mian Mahalleh-ye Pap Kiadeh
- Pain Pap Kiadeh
