= Palat Kaleh, Gilan =

Neighborhood in Gilan province, Iran

Palat Kaleh Persian: پلت كله
- Neighborhood
- Location within Iran
- Coordinates: 37°12′46″N 50°11′51″E
- Country: Iran
- Province: Gilan
- County: Langarud
- District: Central
- City: Chaf and Chamkhaleh

Population (2006)
  - Total: 343
- Time zone: UTC+3:30 (IRST)

Palat Kaleh (Persian: پلت‌كله) (Note: Also known as Palāt Maḩalleh) is a neighborhood in the city of Chaf and Chamkhaleh in the Central District of Langarud County, Gilan province, Iran.

== Demographics ==
=== Population ===
At the time of the 2006 National Census, Palat Kaleh's population was 343 in 105 households, when it was a village in Gel-e Sefid Rural District.

In 2009, the village of Chaf-e Pain merged with the villages of Chaf-e Bala, Chamkhaleh, Galesh Kolam, Hoseynabad-e Chaf, Kamal ol Din Poshteh, Mian Mahalleh-ye Pap Kiadeh, Pain Pap Kiadeh, Palat Kaleh, Pir Poshteh, Radar Kumeh, Soltan Moradi, Tappeh, and Tazehabad-e Chaf to become the city of Chaf and Chamkhaleh.
