= Kileh Sefid =

Kileh Sefid or Keyleh Sefid (Persian: كيله سفيد) may refer to:

- Kileh Sefid, Kermanshah
- Kileh Sefid, Kurdistan
