= Cheshmehha =

Cheshmehha (Persian: چشمه ها) may refer to:

- Cheshmehha, Rudbar-e Jonubi, Kerman Province
- Cheshmehha, Tehran
