= Kamal ol Din Poshteh =

Neighborhood in Gilan province, Iran

Kamal ol Din Poshteh Persian: كمال الدين پشته
- Neighborhood
- Location within Iran
- Coordinates: 37°11′08″N 50°14′57″E
- Country: Iran
- Province: Gilan
- County: Langarud
- District: Central
- City: Chaf and Chamkhaleh

Population (2006)
  - Total: 202
- Time zone: UTC+3:30 (IRST)

Kamal ol Din Poshteh (Persian: كمال الدين پشته) (Note: Also romanized as Kamāl Ed Dīn Poshteh, Kamāl ed Dīn Poshteh, Kamāl od Dīn Poshteh, and Kamāl ol Dīn Poshteh) is a neighborhood in the city of Chaf and Chamkhaleh in the Central District of Langarud County, Gilan province, Iran.

== Demographics ==
=== Population ===
At the time of the 2006 National Census, Kamal ol Din Poshteh's population was 202 in 61 households, when it was a village in Gel-e Sefid Rural District.

In 2009, the village of Chaf-e Pain merged with the villages of Chaf-e Bala, Chamkhaleh, Galesh Kolam, Hoseynabad-e Chaf, Kamal ol Din Poshteh, Mian Mahalleh-ye Pap Kiadeh, Pain Pap Kiadeh, Palat Kaleh, Pir Poshteh, Radar Kumeh, Soltan Moradi, Tappeh, and Tazehabad-e Chaf to become the city of Chaf and Chamkhaleh.
