= Shad Kalayeh =

Neighborhood in Gilan province, Iran

Shad Kalayeh Persian: شادكلايه
- Neighborhood
- Location within Iran
- Coordinates: 37°11′10″N 50°10′13″E
- Country: Iran
- Province: Gilan
- County: Langarud
- District: Central
- City: Langarud

Population (2006)
  - Total: 1,976
- Time zone: UTC+3:30 (IRST)

Shad Kalayeh (Persian: شادكلايه) (Note: Also romanized as Shād Kalāyeh; formerly known as Shāh Kalāyeh) is a neighborhood in the city of Langarud in the Central District of Langarud County, Gilan province, Iran.

== Demographics ==
=== Population ===
At the time of the 2006 National Census, Shad Kalayeh's population was 1,976 in 564 households, when it was a village in Daryasar Rural District. After the census, Shad Kalayeh was annexed by the city of Langarud.
