= Kal-e Sefid =

Kal-e Sefid or Kal Sefid or Kal Safid (Persian: كل سفيد) may refer to:

- Kal-e Sefid, Ilam
- Kal Sefid, Kermanshah
- Kal-e Sefid, Salas-e Babajani, Kermanshah Province
