= Nalkiashar =

Nalkiashar (Persian: محله نالكياشر) may refer to:

- Bala Mahalleh-ye Nalkiashar
- Pain Mahalleh-ye Nalkiashar
