= Gandaki =

Gandaki may refer to:

- Gandaki Province, a province of Nepal
- Gandaki Rural Municipality, a rural municipality in Nepal
- Gandaki River, Nepal and India
- Gandaki Zone, a former administrative zone in Nepal

== See also ==
- Gandak, Kohgiluyeh and Boyer-Ahmad, a village in Iran
- Gandak, Tehran, a village in Iran
- Burhi Gandak River, a tributary of the Ganges
