= Siah Kaldeh =

Siah Kaldeh سياهكلده
- Village
- Location within Iran
- Coordinates: 37°12′04″N 50°06′07″E
- Country: Iran
- Province: Gilan
- County: Langarud
- Bakhsh: Central
- Rural District: Divshal

Population (2016)
  - Total: 296
- Time zone: UTC+3:30 (IRST)

Siah Kaldeh (Persian: سياهكلده, also Romanized as Sīāh Kaldeh; also known as Sīāh Galdeh) is a village in Divshal Rural District, in the Central District of Langarud County, Gilan Province, Iran. At the 2006 census, its population was 327, in 91 families. In 2016, it had 296 people in 109 households.
