= Gelahak =

Village in Tehran province, Iran

Gelahak Persian: گل اهك
- Village
- Location within Iran
- Coordinates: 35°43′07″N 51°56′45″E
- Country: Iran
- Province: Tehran
- County: Damavand
- District: Rudehen
- Rural District: Mehrabad
- Elevation: 1,880–1,980 m (6,170–6,500 ft)

Population (2016)
  - Total: 450
- Time zone: UTC+3:30 (IRST)

Gelahak (Persian: گل اهك) (Note: Also romanized as Gelāhaḵ) is a village in Mehrabad Rural District of Rudehen District in Damavand County, Tehran province, Iran.

== Demographics ==
=== Population ===
At the time of the 2006 National Census, the village's population was 253 in 83 households. The following census in 2011 counted 198 people in 57 households. The 2016 census measured the population of the village as 450 people in 139 households.
