= Kushal Shad =

Village in Gilan province, Iran

Kushal Shad Persian: كوشالشاد
- Village
- Location within Iran
- Coordinates: 37°12′30″N 50°06′42″E
- Country: Iran
- Province: Gilan
- County: Langarud
- District: Central
- Rural District: Divshal

Population (2016)
  - Total: 989
- Time zone: UTC+3:30 (IRST)

Kushal Shad (Persian: كوشالشاد) (Note: Also romanized as Kūshāl Shād; formally known as Kūshāl Shāh (کوشالشاه), also romanized as Kooshal Shah; also known as Kūshālshā and Mīān Maḩalleh-ye Kūshālshāh) is a village in Divshal Rural District of the Central District in Langarud County, Gilan province, Iran.

== Demographics ==
=== Population ===
At the time of the 2006 National Census, the village's population was 932 in 261 households. The following census in 2011 counted 975 people in 328 households. The 2016 census measured the population of the village as 989 people in 352 households.
