= Pist-e Abali =

Village in Tehran province, Iran

Pist-e Abali Persian: پيست آبعلی
- Village
- Location within Iran
- Country: Iran
- Province: Tehran
- County: Damavand
- District: Rudehen
- Rural District: Abali
- Elevation: 2,450 m (8,040 ft)

Population (2016)
  - Total: 30
- Time zone: UTC+3:30 (IRST)

Pist-e Abali (Persian: پيست آبعلی) (Note: Also romanized as Pīst-e Āb‘alī; also known as Pīst-e Eskī-ye Āb‘alī) is a village in Abali Rural District of Rudehen District, Damavand County, Tehran province, Iran.

== Demographics ==
=== Population ===
At the time of the 2006 National Census, the village's population was 20 in eight households. The following census in 2011 counted 45 people in 12 households. The 2016 census measured the population of the village as 30 people in 15 households.
