= Mehrabad, Tehran =

Village in Tehran province, Iran

Mehrabad Persian: مهراباد
- Village
- Location within Iran
- Coordinates: 35°42′22″N 51°54′45″E
- Country: Iran
- Province: Tehran
- County: Damavand
- District: Rudehen
- Rural District: Mehrabad

Population (2016)
  - Total: 5,278
- Time zone: UTC+3:30 (IRST)

Mehrabad (Persian: مهراباد) (Note: Also romanized as Mehrābād; also known as Mehrāhād) is a village in, and the capital of, Mehrabad Rural District in Rudehen District of Damavand County, Tehran province, Iran.

== Demographics ==
=== Population ===
At the time of the 2006 National Census, the village's population was 1,592 in 417 households. The following census in 2011 counted 1,643 people in 435 households. The 2016 census measured the population of the village as 5,278 people in 1,543 households. It was the most populous village in its rural district.
