= Now Deh, Damavand =

Village in Tehran province, Iran

Now Deh Persian: نوده
- Village
- Location within Iran
- Coordinates: 35°41′12″N 51°55′09″E
- Country: Iran
- Province: Tehran
- County: Damavand
- District: Rudehen
- Rural District: Mehrabad
- Elevation: 1,700 m (5,600 ft)

Population (2016)
  - Total: 144
- Time zone: UTC+3:30 (IRST)

Now Deh (Persian: نوده) is a village in Mehrabad Rural District of Rudehen District in Damavand County, Tehran province, Iran.

== Demographics ==
=== Population ===
At the time of the 2006 National Census, the village's population was 172 in 40 households. The following census in 2011 counted 144 people in 41 households. The 2016 census measured the population of the village as 144 people in 42 households.
