= Divshal Poshteh =

Divshal Poshteh ديوشل پشته
- Village
- Location within Iran
- Coordinates: 37°10′17″N 50°06′59″E
- Country: Iran
- Province: Gilan
- County: Langarud
- Bakhsh: Central
- Rural District: Divshal

Population (2016)
  - Total: 142
- Time zone: UTC+3:30 (IRST)

Divshal Poshteh (Persian: ديوشل پشته, also Romanized as Dīvshal Poshteh) is a village in Divshal Rural District, in the Central District of Langarud County, Gilan Province, Iran. At the 2006 census, its population was 186, in 44 families. In 2016, it had 142 people in 45 households.
