= Sled tow =

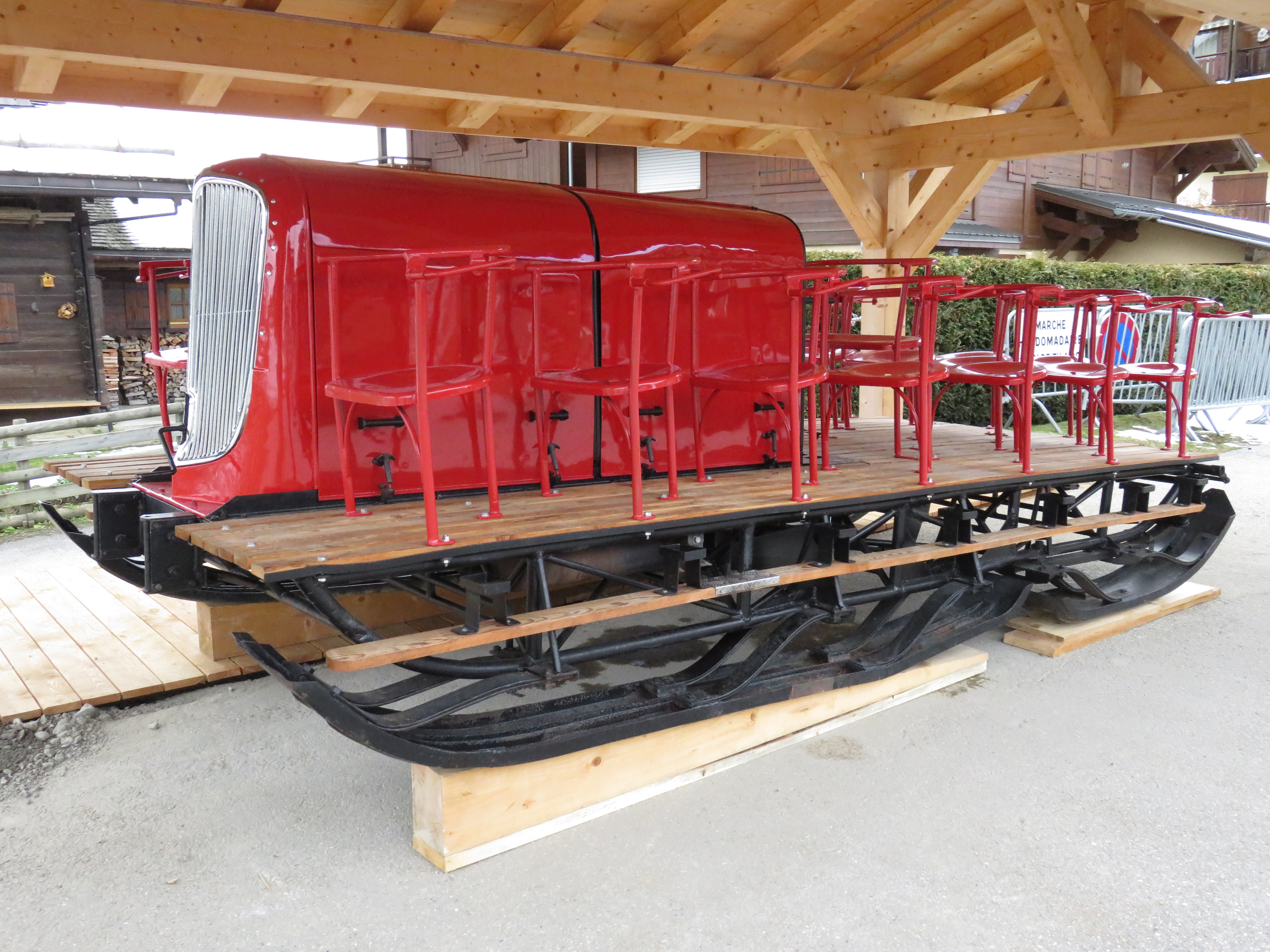
The self-propelled sled from Notre-Dame-de-Bellecombe in France, now restored

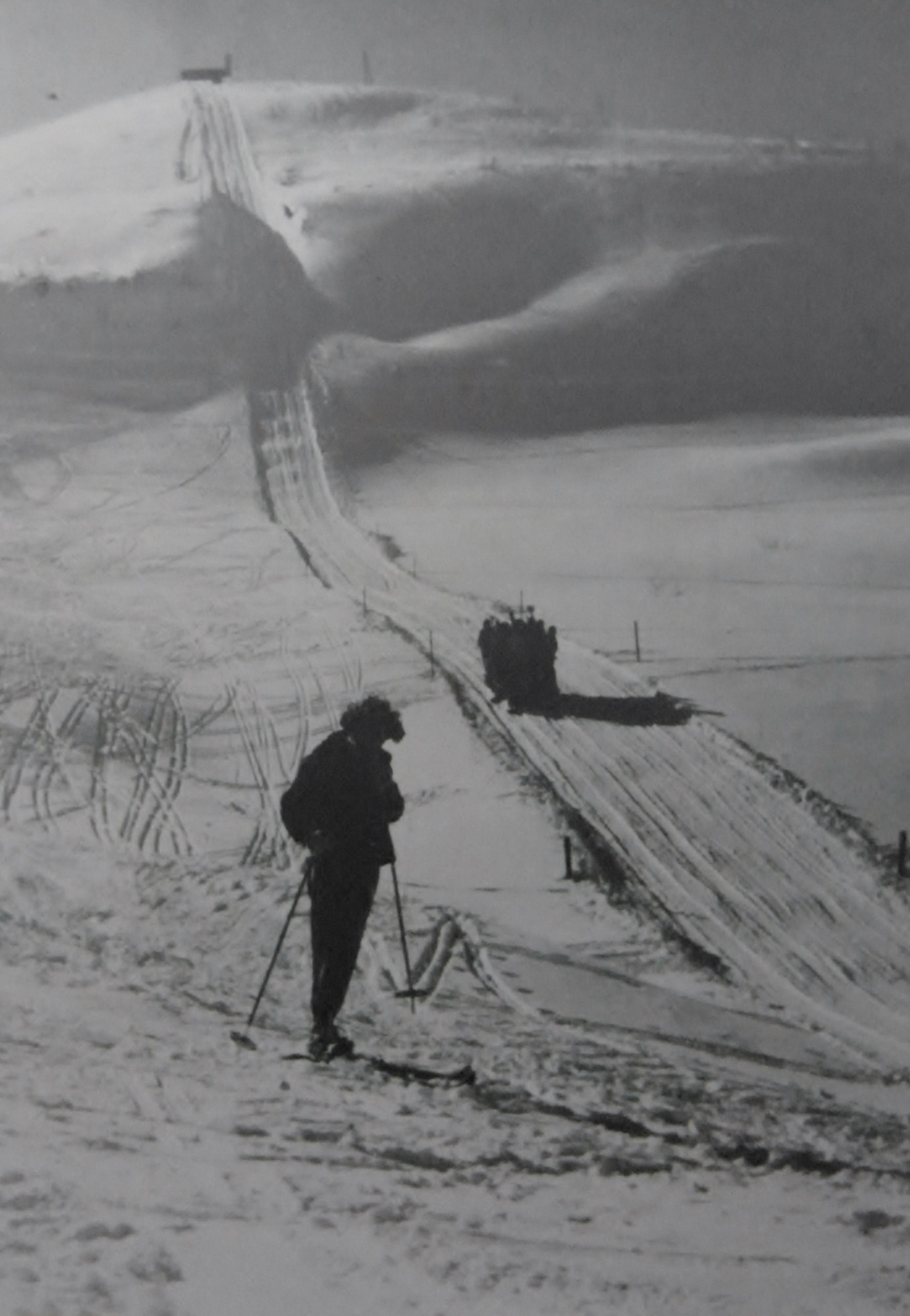
The Monte Bondone sled tow in 1935

The sled tow is a kind of ropeway consisting of one or more sleds hauled along a snow-covered slope by a cable, usually serving as a ski lift.

== Characteristics ==
The most common kind of sled tow was essentially a trackless funicular railway with two counterbalanced sleds attached to a loop of rope driven by an external power source. Some installations instead used self-propelled sleds with an engine that hauled the sled up the hill using an onboard winding drum.

== History and usage ==
Invented in the late 1800s for transport purposes, with one notable installation opening to serve the Chilkoot Pass in 1898, sled tows were soon adapted to the budding alpine skiing industry in parallel with the platter lift and other kinds of surface lift.

The vast majority were built in the interwar and immediate postwar period, quickly being superseded by other kinds of ski lift. In France, sled tows operated from 1937 to 1939 and from 1946 to 1948 on the slopes of Mont Reguet, in La Clusaz from 1933 to 1945 on the current route of the Praz-Ruade chairlift, and in Italy on Monte Bondone. One sled tow remains in operation at Abali, Iran.
