= Jodanukar =

Jodanukar جدانوكر
- Village
- Location within Iran
- Coordinates: 37°11′50″N 50°07′19″E
- Country: Iran
- Province: Gilan
- County: Langarud
- Bakhsh: Central
- Rural District: Divshal

Population (2016)
  - Total: 271
- Time zone: UTC+3:30 (IRST)

Jodanukar (Persian: جدانوكر, also Romanized as Jodānūkar; also known as Jodānokar) is a village in Divshal Rural District, in the Central District of Langarud County, Gilan Province, Iran. At the 2006 census, its population was 304, in 91 families. In 2016, its population was 271, in 106 households.
