= Ardineh =

Village in Tehran province, Iran

Ardineh Persian: آردينه
- Village
- Location within Iran
- Coordinates: 35°47′36″N 51°53′13″E
- Country: Iran
- Province: Tehran
- County: Damavand
- District: Rudehen
- Rural District: Abali
- Elevation: 2,050 m (6,730 ft)

Population (2016)
  - Total: 411
- Time zone: UTC+3:30 (IRST)

Ardineh (Persian: آردينه) (Note: Also romanized as Ārdīneh) is a village in Abali Rural District of Rudehen District in Damavand County, Tehran province, Iran.

== Demographics ==
=== Population ===
At the time of the 2006 National Census, the village's population was 189 in 53 households. The following census in 2011 counted 277 people in 88 households. The 2016 census measured the population of the village as 411 people in 135 households.
