= Yalqan Darreh =

Village in Tehran province, Iran

Yalqan Darreh Persian: يلقان دره
- Village
- Country: Iran
- Province: Tehran
- County: Damavand
- District: Rudehen
- Rural District: Mehrabad

Population (2016)
  - Total: 101
- Time zone: UTC+3:30 (IRST)

Yalqan Darreh (Persian: يلقان دره) (Note: Also known as Yilqan Darreh, also romanized as Yīlqān Darreh) is a village in Mehrabad Rural District of Rudehen District in Damavand County, Tehran province, Iran.

== Demographics ==
=== Population ===
At the time of the 2006 National Census, the village's population was 63 in 15 households. The following census in 2011 counted 38 people in 11 households. The 2016 census measured the population of the village as 101 people in 33 households.
