= Kharrat Mahalleh =

Kharrat Mahalleh (Persian: خراطمحله) may refer to:

- Kharrat Mahalleh, Langarud
- Kharrat Mahalleh, Sowme'eh Sara
