= Divshal =

Village in Gilan province, Iran

Divshal Persian: ديوشل
- Village
- Location within Iran
- Coordinates: 37°10′49″N 50°06′40″E
- Country: Iran
- Province: Gilan
- County: Langarud
- District: Central
- Rural District: Divshal

Population (2016)
  - Total: 2,094
- Time zone: UTC+3:30 (IRST)

Divshal (Persian: ديوشل) (Note: Also romanized as Dīvshal; also known as Bījār Bāgh Dīvshal and Bījār Bāgh-e Dīvshal) is a village in, and the capital of, Divshal Rural District in the Central District of Langarud County, Gilan province, Iran.

== Demographics ==
=== Population ===
At the time of the 2006 National Census, the village's population was 2,268 in 663 households. The following census in 2011 counted 2,176 people in 728 households. The 2016 census measured the population of the village as 2,094 people in 777 households. It was the most populous village in its rural district.
