= Galesh Kalam-e Leyla Kuh =

Galesh Kalam-e Leyla Kuh گالشكلام ليلاكوه
- Village
- Location within Iran
- Coordinates: 37°10′04″N 50°07′41″E
- Country: Iran
- Province: Gilan
- County: Langarud
- Bakhsh: Central
- Rural District: Divshal

Population (2016)
  - Total: 134
- Time zone: UTC+3:30 (IRST)

Galesh Kalam-e Leyla Kuh (Persian: گالشكلام ليلاكوه, also Romanized as Gālesh Kalām-e Leylā Kūh; also known as Gālesh Kalām) is a village in Divshal Rural District, in the Central District of Langarud County, Gilan Province, Iran. At the 2016 census, its population was 134, in 53 families. Down from 199 people in 2006.
