= Tazehabad, Langarud =

Village in Gilan province, Iran

Tazehabad Persian: تازه آباد
- Village
- Location within Iran
- Country: Iran
- Province: Gilan
- County: Langarud
- District: Central
- Rural District: Chaf

Population (2016)
  - Total: 120
- Time zone: UTC+3:30 (IRST)

Tazehabad (Persian: تازه آباد) (Note: Also romanized as Tāzehābād) is a village in Chaf Rural District of the Central District in Langarud County, Gilan province, Iran.

== Demographics ==
=== Population ===
At the time of the 2006 National Census, the village's population was 169 in 44 households. The following census in 2011 counted 133 people in 45 households. The 2016 census measured the population of the village as 120 people in 48 households.
