= Abchalagi =

Abchalagi آبچالگی
- Village
- Location within Iran
- Coordinates: 37°09′41″N 50°08′42″E
- Country: Iran
- Province: Gilan
- County: Langarud
- Bakhsh: Central
- Rural District: Divshal

Population (2016)
  - Total: 69
- Time zone: UTC+3:30 (IRST)

Abchalagi (Persian: آبچالگی, also Romanized as Ābchālagī; also known as Ābchālakī) is a village in Divshal Rural District, in the Central District of Langarud County, Gilan Province, Iran. At the 2016 census, its population was 69, in 26 families. Decreased from 121 people in 2006.
