= Hezardasht =

Village in Tehran province, Iran

Hezardasht Persian: هزاردشت
- Village
- Location within Iran
- Coordinates: 35°46′54″N 51°56′58″E
- Country: Iran
- Province: Tehran
- County: Damavand
- District: Rudehen
- Rural District: Abali

Population (2016)
  - Total: 42
- Time zone: UTC+3:30 (IRST)

Hezardasht (Persian: هزاردشت) (Note: Also romanized as Hezar Dasht and Hezār Dasht) is a mountainous villa settlement in Abali Rural District of Rudehen District in Damavand County, Tehran province, Iran.

== Geography ==
Hezardasht is on Haraz Road, approximately 68 km (42 mi) from Tehran. The weather is cool in summer and cold and snowy in winter. Cool climate and road access resulted in the settlement's becoming a destination for investors.

== Demographics ==
=== Population ===
At the time of the 2006 National Census, the village's population was below the reporting threshold. The following census in 2011 counted 16 people in six households. The 2016 census measured the population of the village as 42 people in 18 households.
