= Abbasabad, Damavand =

Village in Tehran province, Iran

Abbasabad Persian: عباس اباد
- Village
- Location within Iran
- Coordinates: 35°39′43″N 51°53′12″E
- Country: Iran
- Province: Tehran
- County: Damavand
- District: Rudehen
- Rural District: Mehrabad

Population (2016)
  - Total: 92
- Time zone: UTC+3:30 (IRST)

Abbasabad (Persian: عباس اباد) (Note: Also romanized as ‘Abbāsābād) is a village in Mehrabad Rural District of Rudehen District in Damavand County, Tehran province, Iran.

== Demographics ==
=== Population ===
At the time of the 2006 National Census, the village's population was 68 in 15 households. The following census in 2011 counted 95 people in 26 households. The 2016 census measured the population of the village as 92 people in 27 households.
