= Poshtaleh-ye Sar =

Village in Gilan province, Iran

Poshtaleh-ye Sar Persian: پشتلله سر
- Village
- Location within Iran
- Coordinates: 37°14′37″N 50°09′01″E
- Country: Iran
- Province: Gilan
- County: Langarud
- District: Central
- Rural District: Chaf

Population (2016)
  - Total: 109
- Time zone: UTC+3:30 (IRST)

Poshtaleh-ye Sar (Persian: پشتلله سر) (Note: Also known as Poshtaleh-ye Sarbargū Sarā) is a village in Chaf Rural District of the Central District in Langarud County, Gilan province, Iran.

== Demographics ==
=== Population ===
At the time of the 2006 National Census, the village's population was 144 in 38 households. The following census in 2011 counted 126 people in 37 households. The 2016 census measured the population of the village as 109 people in 42 households.
