= Lukolayeh =

Village in Gilan province, Iran

Lukolayeh Persian: لوكلايه
- Village
- Location within Iran
- Coordinates: 37°11′54″N 50°06′42″E
- Country: Iran
- Province: Gilan
- County: Langarud
- District: Central
- Rural District: Divshal

Population (2016)
  - Total: 410
- Time zone: UTC+3:30 (IRST)

Lukolayeh (Persian: لوكلايه) (Note: Also romanized as Lūkolāyeh) is a village in Divshal Rural District of the Central District in Langarud County, Gilan province, Iran.

== Demographics ==
=== Population ===
At the time of the 2006 National Census, the village's population was 395 in 119 households. The following census in 2011 counted 402 people in 138 households. The 2016 census measured the population of the village as 410 people in 155 households.
