= Hasanabad, Langarud =

Village in Gilan province, Iran

Hasanabad Persian: حسن آباد
- Village
- Location within Iran
- Coordinates: 37°15′14″N 50°10′09″E
- Country: Iran
- Province: Gilan
- County: Langarud
- District: Central
- Rural District: Chaf

Population (2016)
  - Total: 50
- Time zone: UTC+3:30 (IRST)

Hasanabad (Persian: حسن آباد) (Note: Also romanized as Ḩasanābād) is a village in Chaf Rural District of the Central District in Langarud County, Gilan province, Iran.

== Demographics ==
=== Population ===
At the time of the 2006 National Census, the village's population was 66 in 25 households. The following census in 2011 counted 52 people in 21 households. The 2016 census measured the population of the village as 50 people in 21 households.
