= Khal Kiasar =

Village in Gilan province, Iran

Khal Kiasar Persian: خالك ياسر
- Village
- Location within Iran
- Coordinates: 37°12′58″N 50°11′19″E
- Country: Iran
- Province: Gilan
- County: Langarud
- District: Central
- Rural District: Chaf

Population (2016)
  - Total: 763
- Time zone: UTC+3:30 (IRST)

Khal Kiasar (Persian: خالکیاسر) (Note: Also romanized as Khāl Kīāsar) is a village in Chaf Rural District of the Central District in Langarud County, Gilan province, Iran.

== Demographics ==
=== Population ===
At the time of the 2006 National Census, the village's population was 706 in 235 households. The following census in 2011 counted 671 people in 238 households. The 2016 census measured the population of the village as 763 people in 286 households.
