= Hajj Ebrahim Deh =

Hajj Ebrahim Deh حاج ابراهيم ده
- Village
- Location within Iran
- Coordinates: 37°12′01″N 50°07′29″E
- Country: Iran
- Province: Gilan
- County: Langarud
- Bakhsh: Central
- Rural District: Divshal

Population (2016)
  - Total: 281
- Time zone: UTC+3:30 (IRST)

Hajj Ebrahim Deh (Persian: حاج ابراهيم ده, also Romanized as Ḩājj Ebrāhīm Deh; also known as Ḩājīebrāhīmdeh) is a village in Divshal Rural District, in the Central District of Langarud County, Gilan Province, Iran. At the 2016 census, its population was 281, in 99 families. Up from 222 people in 2006.
