= Khalia Gol =

Khalia Gol خالياگل
- Village
- Location within Iran
- Coordinates: 37°14′18″N 50°04′49″E
- Country: Iran
- Province: Gilan
- County: Langarud
- Bakhsh: Central
- Rural District: Divshal

Population (2016)
  - Total: 27
- Time zone: UTC+3:30 (IRST)

Khalia Gol (Persian: خالياگل, also Romanized as Khālīā Gol and Khālīāgol; also known as Khālīkul) is a village in Divshal Rural District, in the Central District of Langarud County, Gilan Province, Iran. At the 2006 census, its population was 29, in 10 families. In 2016, it had 27 people in 11 households.
