= Fatideh =

Village in Gilan province, Iran

Fatideh Persian: فتيده
- Village
- Location within Iran
- Coordinates: 37°11′12″N 50°12′58″E
- Country: Iran
- Province: Gilan
- County: Langarud
- District: Central
- Rural District: Gel-e Sefid

Population (2016)
  - Total: 740
- Time zone: UTC+3:30 (IRST)

Fatideh (Persian: فتيده) (Note: Also romanized as Fateydeh and Fatīdeh) is a village in Gel-e Sefid Rural District of the Central District in Langarud County, Gilan province, Iran.

== Demographics ==
=== Language ===
It is an ancestrally Gilaki speaking village.

=== Population ===
At the time of the 2006 National Census, the village's population was 1,006 in 334 households. The following census in 2011 counted 838 people in 306 households. The 2016 census measured the population of the village as 740 people in 297 households.

== Notable people ==
Mokhtar Aminian, Shia Cleric
