= Jurd =

Jurd may refer to:

- Stan Jurd (b. 1958), Australian rugby player
- Laura Jurd (b. 1990), a British musician
- Jurd, Iran, a village in Tehran Province, Iran
