= Darya Kenar =

Village in Gilan province, Iran

Darya Kenar Persian: دريا كنار
- Village
- Location within Iran
- Coordinates: 37°10′21″N 50°14′56″E
- Country: Iran
- Province: Gilan
- County: Langarud
- District: Central
- Rural District: Gel-e Sefid

Population (2016)
  - Total: 830
- Time zone: UTC+3:30 (IRST)

Darya Kenar (Persian: درياكنار) (Note: Also romanized as Daryā Kenār; also known as Daryā Kenār-e Soflá) is a village in Gel-e Sefid Rural District of the Central District in Langarud County, Gilan province, Iran.

== Demographics ==
=== Population ===
At the time of the 2006 National Census, the village's population was 1,021 in 347 households. The following census in 2011 counted 997 people in 373 households. The 2016 census measured the population of the village as 830 people in 342 households. It was the most populous village in its rural district.
