= Chenaran, Tehran =

Village in Tehran province, Iran

Chenaran Persian: چناران
- Village
- Location within Iran
- Coordinates: 35°41′51″N 51°57′45″E
- Country: Iran
- Province: Tehran
- County: Damavand
- District: Rudehen
- Rural District: Mehrabad
- Elevation: 1,860–1,960 m (6,100–6,430 ft)

Population (2016)
  - Total: 588
- Time zone: UTC+3:30 (IRST)

Chenaran (Persian: چناران) (Note: Also romanized as Chenārān) is a village in Mehrabad Rural District of Rudehen District in Damavand County, Tehran province, Iran.

== Demographics ==
=== Population ===
At the time of the 2006 National Census, the village's population was 372 in 109 households. The following census in 2011 counted 460 people in 134 households. The 2016 census measured the population of the village as 588 people in 190 households.
