= Esmail Sara =

Esmail Sara اسماعيل سرا
- Village
- Location within Iran
- Coordinates: 37°09′52″N 50°08′30″E
- Country: Iran
- Province: Gilan
- County: Langarud
- Bakhsh: Central
- Rural District: Divshal

Population (2016)
  - Total: 35
- Time zone: UTC+3:30 (IRST)

Esmail Sara (Persian: اسماعيل سرا, also Romanized as Esmāʿīl Sarā; also known as Esmāeelsarā) is a village in Divshal Rural District, in the Central District of Langarud County, Gilan Province, Iran. At the 2016 census, its population was 35, in 17 families. Decreased from 67 people in 2006.
