= Vaskareh =

Village in Tehran province, Iran

Vaskareh Persian: وسكاره
- Village
- Location within Iran
- Coordinates: 35°46′08″N 51°53′37″E
- Country: Iran
- Province: Tehran
- County: Damavand
- District: Rudehen
- Rural District: Abali
- Elevation: 1,900 m (6,200 ft)

Population (2016)
  - Total: 360
- Time zone: UTC+3:30 (IRST)

Vaskareh (Persian: وسكاره) (Note: Also romanized as Vaskāreh; also known as Vesgāh and Vesgāreh) is a village in Abali Rural District of Rudehen District in Damavand County, Tehran province, Iran.

== Demographics ==
=== Population ===
At the time of the 2006 National Census, the village's population was 75 in 24 households. The following census in 2011 counted 349 people in 122 households. The 2016 census measured the population of the village as 360 people in 130 households.
