= Bazar Deh-e Gol Bagh =

Village in Gilan province, Iran

Bazar Deh-e Gol Bagh Persian: بازارده گلباغ
- Village
- Location within Iran
- Coordinates: 37°12′31″N 50°10′04″E
- Country: Iran
- Province: Gilan
- County: Langarud
- District: Central
- Rural District: Divshal

Population (2016)
  - Total: 502
- Time zone: UTC+3:30 (IRST)

Bazar Deh-e Gol Bagh (Persian: بازارده گلباغ) (Note: Also romanized as Bāzār Deh-e Gol Bāgh; also known as Bāzār Deh) is a village in Divshal Rural District of the Central District in Langarud County, Gilan province, Iran.

== Demographics ==
=== Population ===
At the time of the 2006 National Census, the village's population was 146 in 42 households. The following census in 2011 counted 426 people in 146 households. The 2016 census measured the population of the village as 502 people in 188 households.
