= Galesh Khaleh =

Village in Gilan province, Iran

Galesh Khaleh Persian: گالش خاله
- Village
- Location within Iran
- Coordinates: 37°11′07″N 50°13′36″E
- Country: Iran
- Province: Gilan
- County: Langarud
- District: Central
- Rural District: Gel-e Sefid

Population (2016)
  - Total: 77
- Time zone: UTC+3:30 (IRST)

Galesh Khaleh (Persian: گالش خاله) (Note: Also romanized as Gālesh Khāleh) is a village in Gel-e Sefid Rural District of the Central District in Langarud County, Gilan province, Iran.

== Demographics ==
=== Population ===
At the time of the 2006 National Census, the village's population was 80 in 29 households. The following census in 2011 counted 90 people in 32 households. The 2016 census measured the population of the village as 77 people in 29 households.
