= Akhund Mahalleh, Gilan =

Akhund Mahalleh آخوند محله
- Village
- Location within Iran
- Coordinates: 37°12′26″N 50°05′31″E
- Country: Iran
- Province: Gilan
- County: Langarud
- Bakhsh: Central
- Rural District: Divshal

Population (2016)
  - Total: 77
- Time zone: UTC+3:30 (IRST)

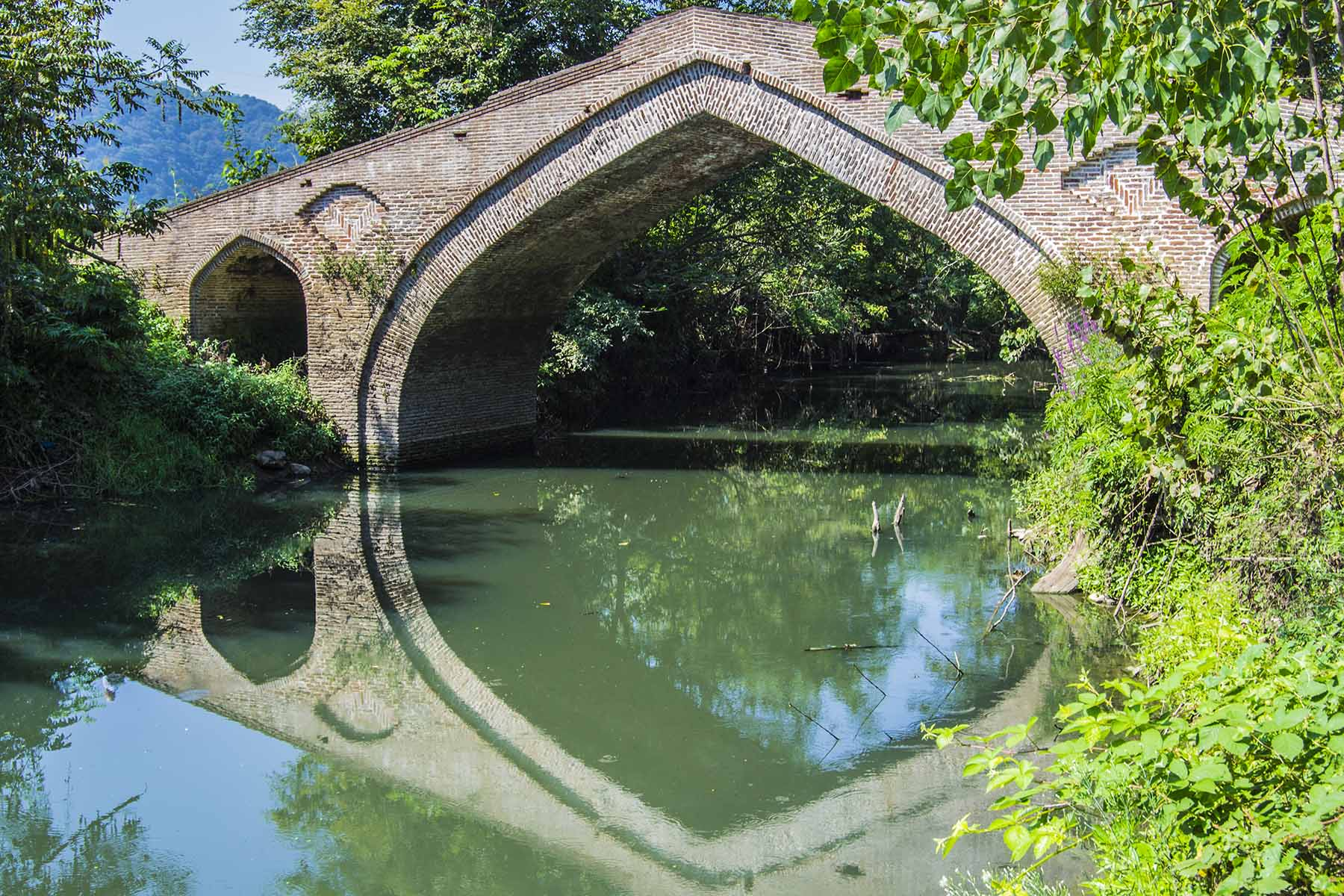

Akhund Mahalleh (Persian: آخوندمحله, also Romanized as Ākhūnd Maḩalleh) is a village in Divshal Rural District, in the Central District of Langarud County, Gilan Province, Iran. At the 2016 census, its population was 77, in 30 families. Down from 101 people in 2006.
