= Mubandan =

Village in Gilan province, Iran

Mubandan Persian: موبندان
- Village
- Location within Iran
- Country: Iran
- Province: Gilan
- County: Langarud
- District: Central
- Rural District: Divshal

Population (2016)
  - Total: 1,127
- Time zone: UTC+3:30 (IRST)

Mubandan (Persian: موبندان) (Note: Also romanized as Mūbandān) is a village in Divshal Rural District of the Central District in Langarud County, Gilan province, Iran.

== Demographics ==
=== Population ===
At the time of the 2006 National Census, the village's population was 426 in 128 households. The following census in 2011 counted 1,282 people in 403 households. The 2016 census measured the population of the village as 1,127 people in 373 households.
