= Talesh Mahalleh, Langarud =

Village in Gilan province, Iran

Talesh Mahalleh Persian: طالش محله
- Village
- Location within Iran
- Coordinates: 37°11′06″N 50°06′08″E
- Country: Iran
- Province: Gilan
- County: Langarud
- District: Central
- Rural District: Divshal

Population (2016)
  - Total: 1,061
- Time zone: UTC+3:30 (IRST)

Talesh Mahalleh (Persian: طالش محله) (Note: Also romanized as Ţālesh Maḩalleh) is a village in Divshal Rural District of the Central District in Langarud County, Gilan province, Iran.

== Demographics ==
=== Population ===
At the time of the 2006 National Census, the village's population was 1,124 in 313 households. The following census in 2011 counted 1,106 people in 356 households. The 2016 census measured the population of the village as 1,061 people in 374 households.
