= Leyla Kuh =

Village in Gilan province, Iran

Leyla Kuh Persian: ليلاكوه
- Village
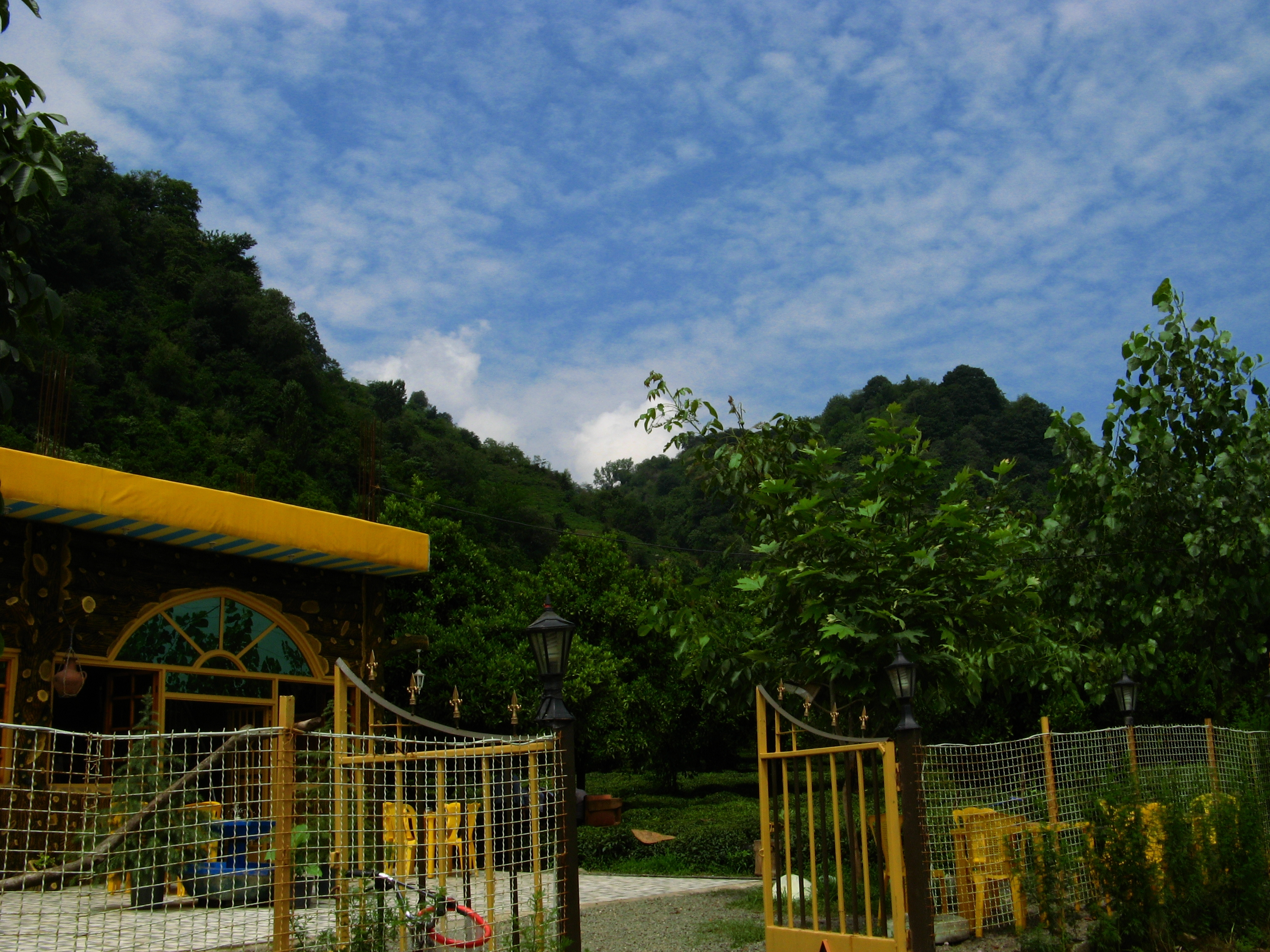
- The village of Leyla Kuh

- Location within Iran
- Coordinates: 37°10′34″N 50°07′51″E
- Country: Iran
- Province: Gilan
- County: Langarud
- District: Central
- Rural District: Divshal

Population (2016)
  - Total: 1,885
- Time zone: UTC+3:30 (IRST)

Leyla Kuh (Persian: ليلاكوه) (Note: Also romanized as 'Leylā Kūh; also known as Leyleh Kooh, Leyleh Kūh, Leylī Kūh, Līlehkūh, and Līlkūh) is a village in Divshal Rural District of the Central District in Langarud County, Gilan province, Iran.

== Demographics ==
=== Population ===
At the time of the 2006 National Census, the village's population was 1,692 in 477 households. The following census in 2011 counted 1,831 people in 537 households. The 2016 census measured the population of the village as 1,885 people in 564 households.
