= Khurin, Damavand =

Village in Tehran province, Iran

Khurin Persian: خورين
- Village
- Location within Iran
- Coordinates: 35°40′56″N 51°54′51″E
- Country: Iran
- Province: Tehran
- County: Damavand
- District: Rudehen
- Rural District: Mehrabad
- Elevation: 1,580–1,660 m (5,180–5,450 ft)

Population (2016)
  - Total: 117
- Time zone: UTC+3:30 (IRST)

Khurin (Persian: خورين) (Note: Also romanized as Khowrīn and Khūrīn) is a village in Mehrabad Rural District of Rudehen District in Damavand County, Tehran province, Iran.

== Demographics ==
=== Population ===
At the time of the 2006 National Census, the village's population was 116 in 41 households. The following census in 2011 counted 40 people in 12 households. The 2016 census measured the population of the village as 117 people in 37 households.
