= Kharrat Mahalleh, Langarud =

Kharrat Mahalleh خراط محله
- Village
- Location within Iran
- Coordinates: 37°12′00″N 50°08′00″E
- Country: Iran
- Province: Gilan
- County: Langarud
- Bakhsh: Central
- Rural District: Divshal

Population (2016)
  - Total: 343
- Time zone: UTC+3:30 (IRST)

Kharrat Mahalleh (Persian: خراط محله, also Romanized as Kharrāţ Maḩalleh) is a village in Divshal Rural District, in the Central District of Langarud County, Gilan Province, Iran. At the 2016 census, its population was 343, in 122 families. Increased from 163 people in 2006.
