= Cheshmehha, Tehran =

Village in Tehran province, Iran

Cheshmehha Persian: چشمه ها
- Village
- Location within Iran
- Coordinates: 35°40′11″N 51°56′20″E
- Country: Iran
- Province: Tehran
- County: Damavand
- District: Rudehen
- Rural District: Mehrabad
- Elevation: 1,750 m (5,740 ft)

Population (2016)
  - Total: 107
- Time zone: UTC+3:30 (IRST)

Cheshmehha (Persian: چشمه ها) (Note: Also romanized as Cheshmehhā) is a village in Mehrabad Rural District of Rudehen District in Damavand County, Tehran province, Iran.

== Demographics ==
=== Population ===
At the time of the 2006 National Census, the village's population was 106 in 30 households. The following census in 2011 counted 60 people in 16 households. The 2016 census measured the population of the village as 107 people in 37 households.
