= Bala Pap Kiadeh =

Village in Gilan province, Iran

Bala Pap Kiadeh Persian: بالاپاپكياده
- Village
- Location within Iran
- Coordinates: 37°13′39″N 50°11′28″E
- Country: Iran
- Province: Gilan
- County: Langarud
- District: Central
- Rural District: Chaf

Population (2016)
  - Total: 532
- Time zone: UTC+3:30 (IRST)

Bala Pap Kiadeh (Persian: بالاپاپكياده) (Note: Also romanized as Bālā Pāp Kīādeh; also known as Balamahalleh-ye Papiyadeh) is a village in Chaf Rural District of the Central District in Langarud County, Gilan province, Iran.

== Demographics ==
=== Population ===
At the time of the 2006 National Census, the village's population was 522 in 170 households. The following census in 2011 counted 538 people in 196 households. The 2016 census measured the population of the village as 532 people in 211 households.
