= Mehrabad Rural District (Damavand County) =

Rural district in Tehran province, Iran

Mehrabad Rural District Persian: دهستان مهرآباد
- Rural District
- Location within Iran
- Coordinates: 35°41′N 51°55′E
- Country: Iran
- Province: Tehran
- County: Damavand
- District: Rudehen
- Established: 1996
- Capital: Mehrabad
- Elevation: 1,680–1,780 m (5,510–5,840 ft)

Population (2016)
  - Total: 6,911
- Time zone: UTC+3:30 (IRST)

Mehrabad Rural District (Persian: دهستان مهرآباد) is in Rudehen District of Damavand County, Tehran province, Iran. Its capital is the village of Mehrabad.

== Demographics ==
=== Population ===
At the time of the 2006 National Census, the rural district's population was 2,842 in 778 households. There were 2,794 inhabitants in 768 households at the following census of 2011. The 2016 census measured the population of the rural district as 6,911 in 2,059 households. The most populous of its 17 villages was Mehrabad, with 5,278 people.

=== Other villages in the rural district ===
- Abbasabad
- Chenaran
- Cheshmehha
- Gandak
- Gelahak
- Khurin
- Now Deh
- Yalqan Darreh
