= Javard =

Village in Tehran province, Iran

Javard Persian: جورد
- Village
- Location within Iran
- Coordinates: 35°48′10″N 51°51′54″E
- Country: Iran
- Province: Tehran
- County: Damavand
- District: Rudehen
- Rural District: Abali
- Elevation: 2,100 m (6,900 ft)

Population (2016)
  - Total: 653
- Time zone: UTC+3:30 (IRST)

Javard (Persian: جورد) (Note: Also romanized as Jūrd) is a village in Abali Rural District of Rudehen District in Damavand County, Tehran province, Iran.

== Demographics ==
=== Population ===
At the time of the 2006 National Census, the village's population was 270 in 76 households. The following census in 2011 counted 345 people in 110 households. The 2016 census measured the population of the village as 653 people in 212 households.
