= Abali Rural District =

Rural district in Tehran province, Iran

Abali Rural District Persian: دهستان آبعلی
- Rural District
- Location within Iran
- Coordinates: 35°47′N 51°57′E
- Country: Iran
- Province: Tehran
- County: Damavand
- District: Rudehen
- Established: 1987
- Capital: Abali

Population (2016)
  - Total: 2,902
- Time zone: UTC+3:30 (IRST)

Abali Rural District (Persian: دهستان آبعلی) is in Rudehen District of Damavand County, Tehran province, Iran. It is administered from the city of Abali.

== Demographics ==
=== Population ===
At the time of the 2006 National Census, the rural district's population was 2,047 in 578 households. There were 2,534 inhabitants in 778 households at the following census of 2011. The 2016 census measured the population of the rural district as 2,902 in 951 households. The most populous of its 13 villages was Sadat Mahalleh, with 1,397 people. The rural district had six populated settlements, three settlements with fewer than four residents, three villages with no households, and one mining site.

=== Other villages in the rural district ===
- Ardineh
- Hezardasht
- Javard
- Pist-e Abali
- Vaskareh
