= Bala Mahalleh-ye Nalkiashar =

Bala Mahalleh-ye Nalkiashar بالامحله نالكياشر
- Village
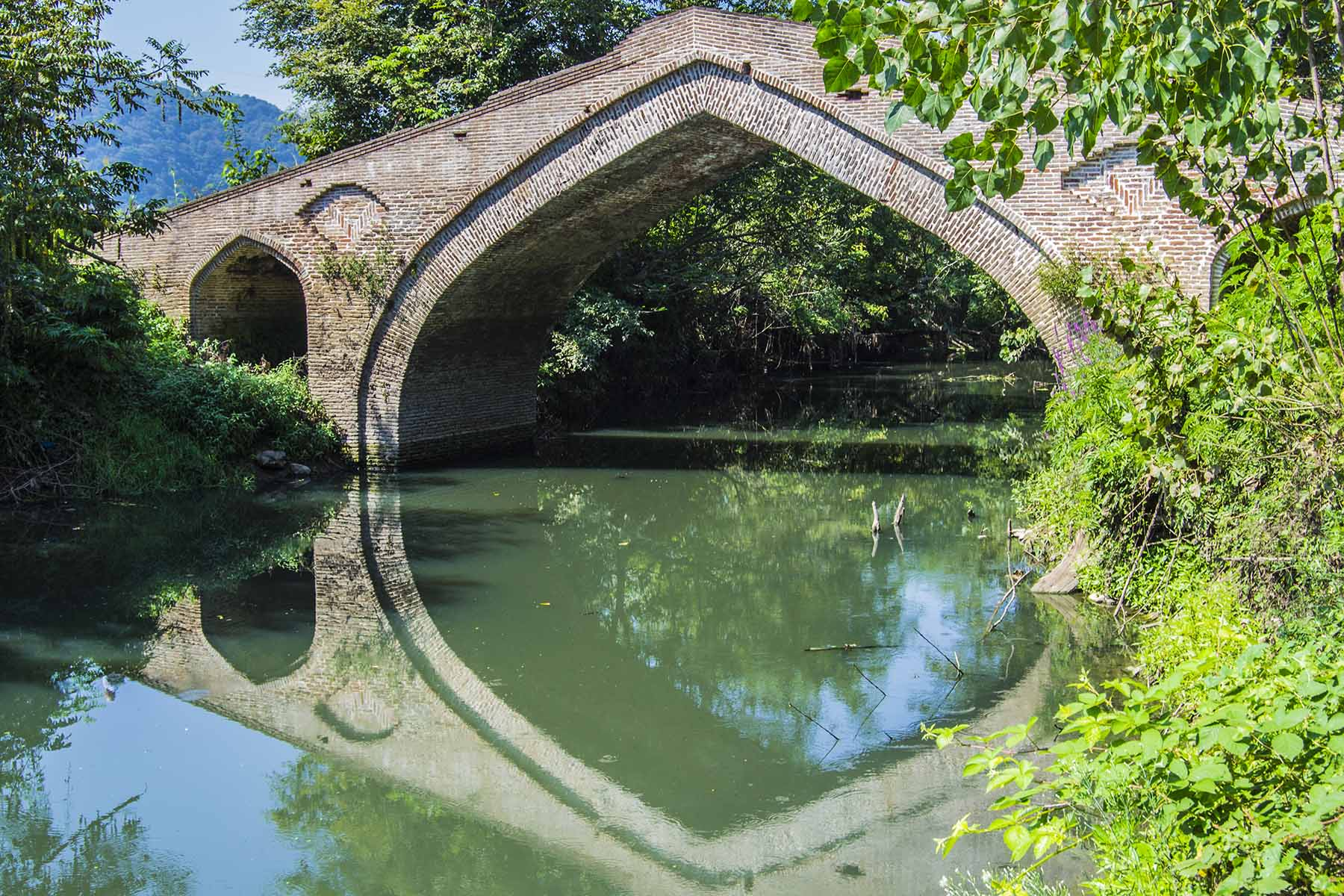

- Location within Iran
- Coordinates: 37°14′11″N 50°07′30″E
- Country: Iran
- Province: Gilan
- County: Langarud
- Bakhsh: Central
- Rural District: Divshal

Population (2016)
  - Total: 149
- Time zone: UTC+3:30 (IRST)

Bala Mahalleh-ye Nalkiashar (Persian: بالامحله نالكياشر, also Romanized as Bālā Maḩalleh-ye Nālkīāshar) is a village in Divshal Rural District, in the Central District of Langarud County, Gilan Province, Iran. At the 2016 census, its population was 149, in 60 families. Down from 212 people in 2006.
