= Pain Mahalleh-ye Nalkiashar =

Pain Mahalleh-ye Nalkiashar پائين محله نالكياشر
- Village
- Location within Iran
- Coordinates: 37°13′45″N 50°04′55″E
- Country: Iran
- Province: Gilan
- County: Langarud
- Bakhsh: Central
- Rural District: Divshal

Population (2016)
  - Total: 208
- Time zone: UTC+3:30 (IRST)

Pain Mahalleh-ye Nalkiashar (Persian: پائين محله نالكياشر, also Romanized as Pā’īn Maḩalleh-ye Nālkīāshar) is a village in Divshal Rural District, in the Central District of Langarud County, Gilan Province, Iran. At the 2006 census, its population was 263, in 75 families. In 2016, its population was 208, in 79 households.
