= Chaf and Chamkhaleh =

City in Gilan province, Iran

Chaf and Chamkhaleh Persian: چاف و چمخاله
- City
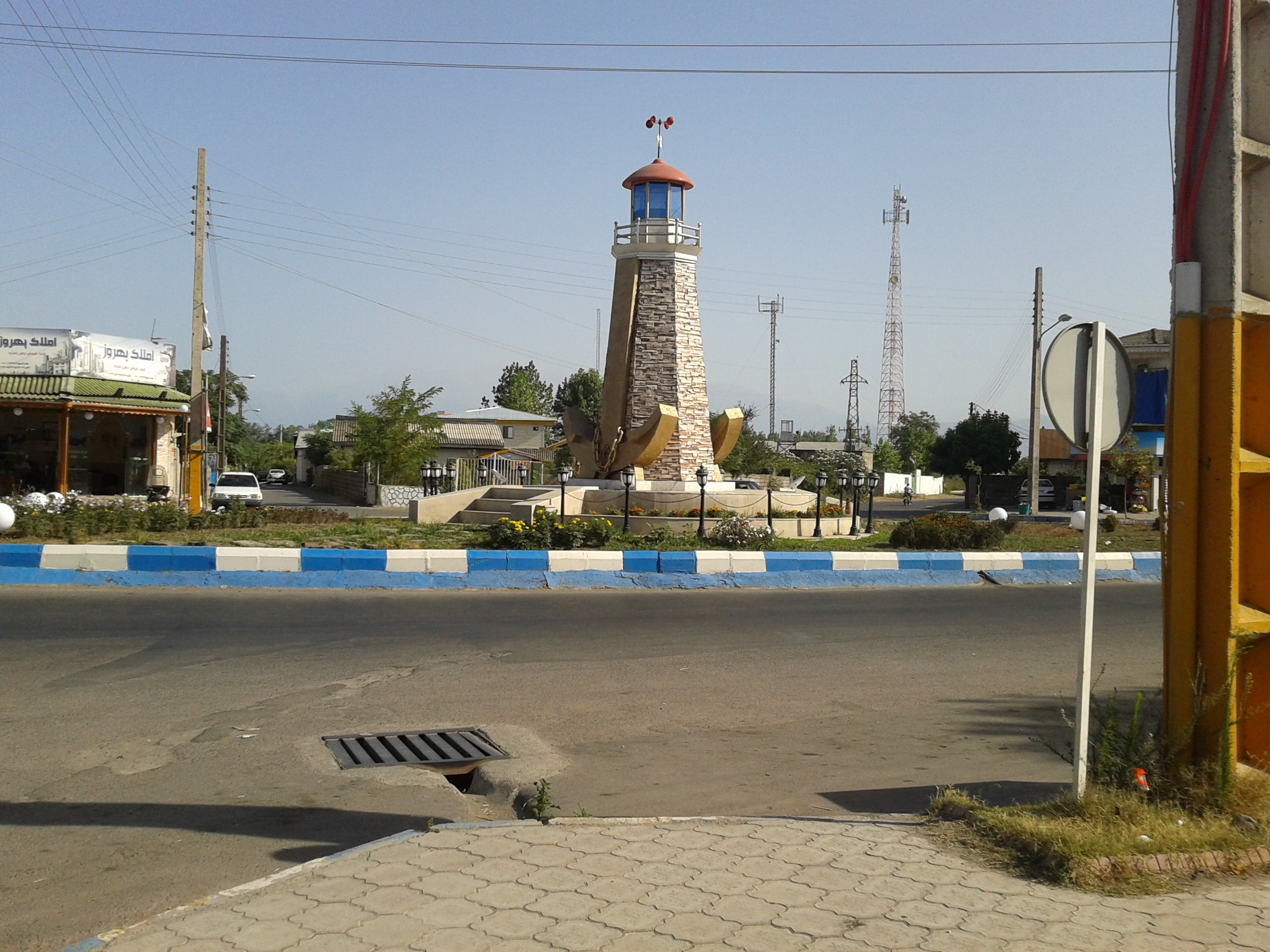
- Harbor and lighthouse in Chaf and Chamkhaleh

- Location within Iran
- Coordinates: 37°13′46″N 50°15′16″E
- Country: Iran
- Province: Gilan
- County: Langarud
- District: Central

Population (2016)
  - Total: 8,840
- Time zone: UTC+3:30 (IRST)

Chaf and Chamkhaleh (Persian: چاف و چمخاله) (Note: Also known as Cham Qal‘eh and Chamkhāleh; formerly the village of Chaf-e Pain (چاف پائين)) is a city in the Central District of Langarud County in Gilan province of northwestern Iran, serving as the administrative center for Chaf Rural District. The city is located on the Caspian Sea.

== Demographics ==
=== Population ===
At the time of the 2006 National Census, the population was 2,909 in 866 households, when it was the village of Chaf-e Pain in Chaf Rural District.

In 2009, Chaf-e Pain village merged with the villages of Chaf-e Bala, Chamkhaleh, Galesh Kolam, Hoseynabad-e Chaf, Kamal ol Din Poshteh, Mian Mahalleh-ye Pap Kiadeh, Pain Pap Kiadeh, Palat Kaleh, Pir Poshteh, Radar Kumeh, Soltan Moradi, Tappeh, and Tazehabad-e Chaf to become the city of Chaf and Chamkhaleh.

The following census in 2011 counted 4,494 people in 1,436 households. The 2016 census measured the population of the city as 8,840 people in 3,137 households.

== Geography ==
Chaf and Chamkhaleh is a coastal city in Gilan Province. A substantial portion of the city’s territory is located along the coast of the Caspian Sea, which has influenced its development as a seaside destination. The area has been used for tourism for an extended period and serves as one of the main coastal tourism centers in the province, after Bandar-e Anzali. The region includes coastal wetlands that provide habitat for various bird species, as well as stretches of relatively undeveloped and calm shoreline.

== Gallery ==
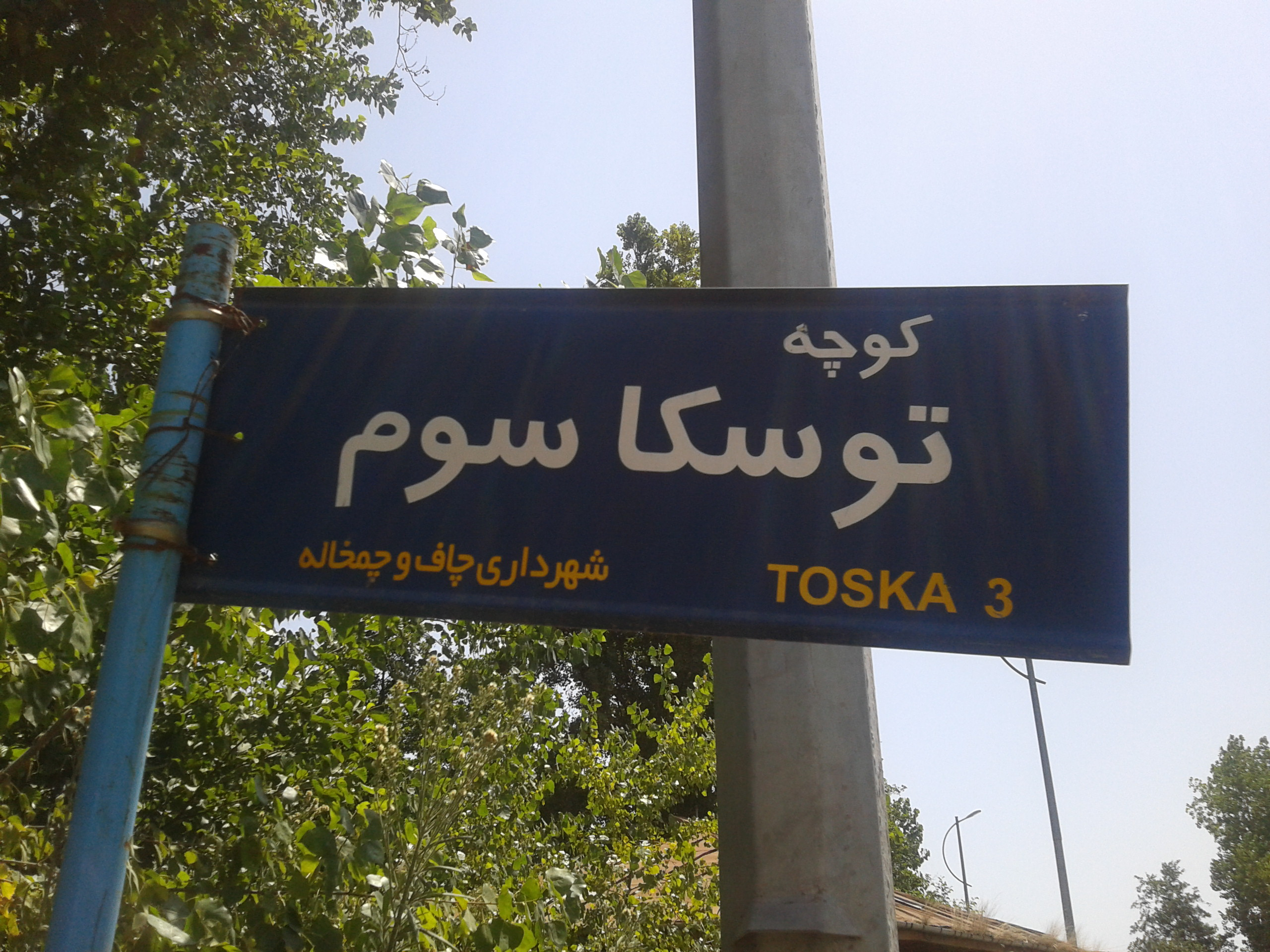
Road sign: "Experience Chaf and Chamkhale"

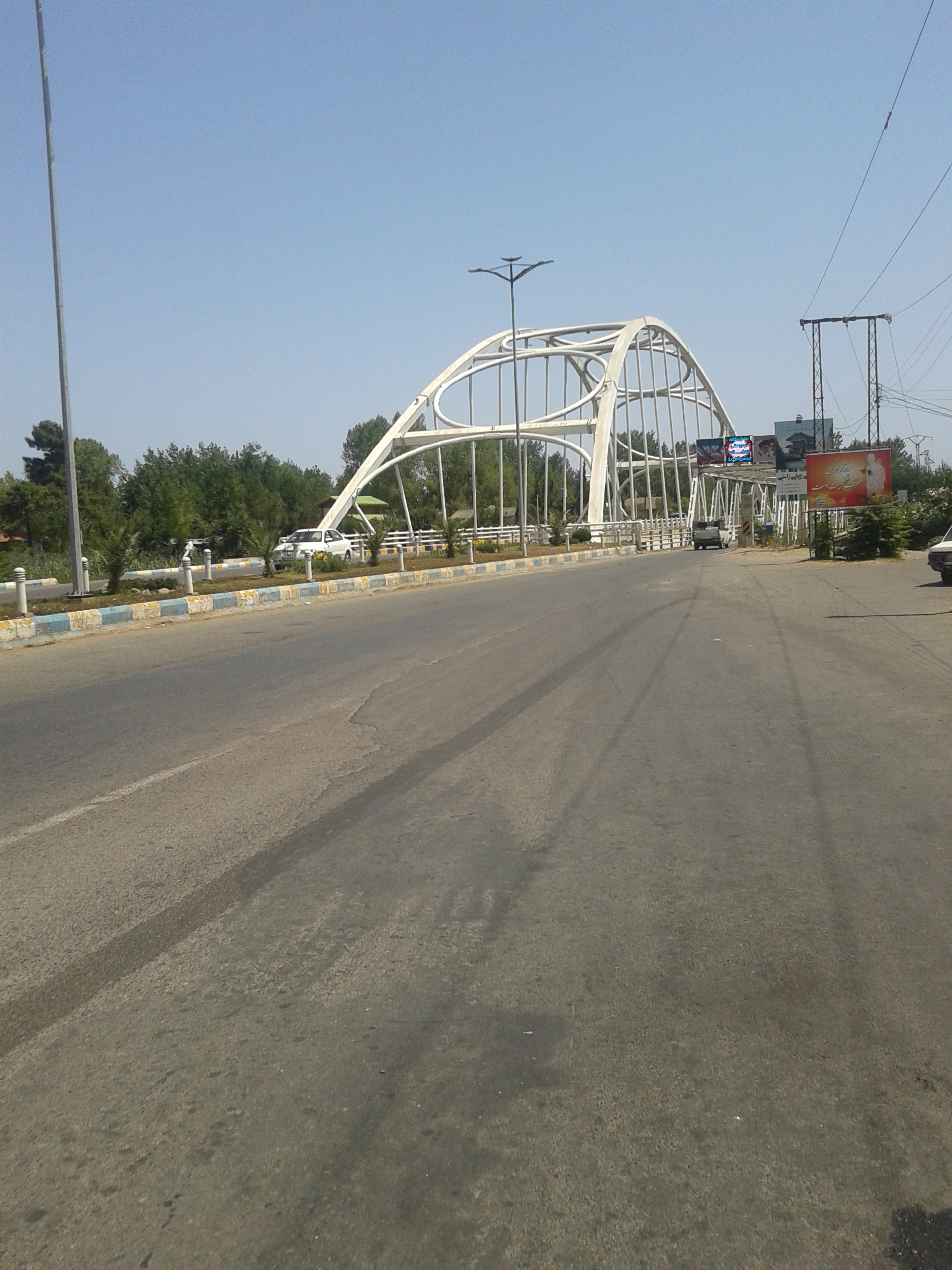
Chamkhaleh Bridge

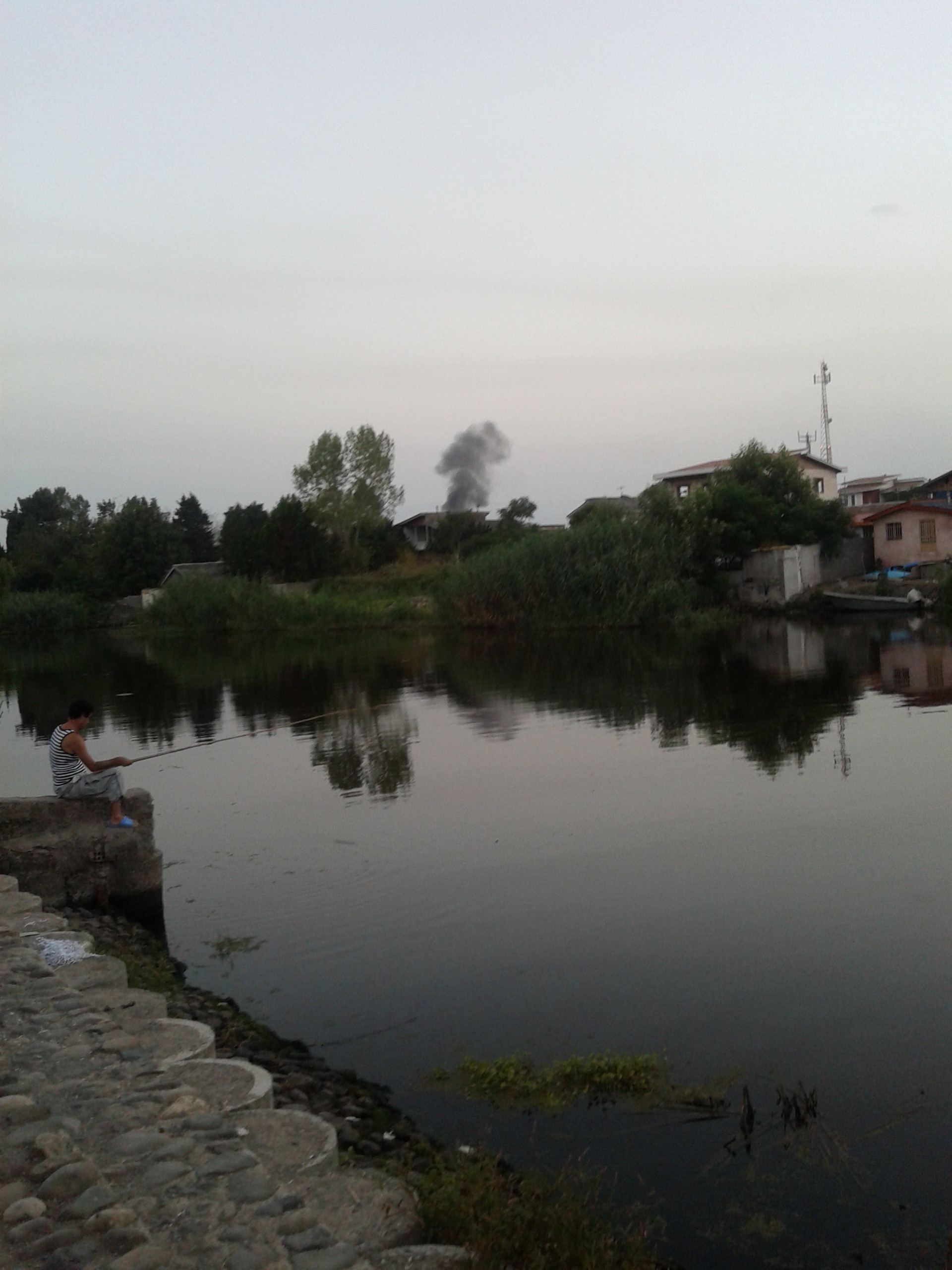
Chamkhaleh River
- Media related to Chaf and Chamkhaleh at Wikimedia Commons

== See also ==
- Chamkhaleh Port
