= Sadat Mahalleh, Divshal =

Sadat Mahalleh سادات محله
- Village
- Location within Iran
- Coordinates: 37°13′04″N 50°05′39″E
- Country: Iran
- Province: Gilan
- County: Langarud
- Bakhsh: Central
- Rural District: Divshal

Population (2016)
  - Total: 150
- Time zone: UTC+3:30 (IRST)

Sadat Mahalleh (Persian: سادات محله, also Romanized as Sādāt Maḩalleh) is a village in Divshal Rural District, in the Central District of Langarud County, Gilan Province, Iran. At the 2016 census, its population was 150, in 60 families. Down from 216 people in 2006.
