= Gel-e Sefid, Gilan =

Village in Gilan province, Iran

Gel-e Sefid Persian: گل سفيد
- Village
- Location within Iran
- Coordinates: 37°10′38″N 50°14′32″E
- Country: Iran
- Province: Gilan
- County: Langarud
- District: Central
- Rural District: Gel-e Sefid

Population (2016)
  - Total: 694
- Time zone: UTC+3:30 (IRST)

Gel-e Sefid (Persian: گل سفيد) (Note: Also known as Gil Sifīd) is a village in, and the capital of, Gel-e Sefid Rural District in the Central District of Langarud County, Gilan province, Iran.

== Demographics ==
=== Population ===
At the time of the 2006 National Census, the village's population was 920 in 316 households. The following census in 2011 counted 851 people in 317 households. The 2016 census measured the population of the village as 694 people in 286 households.
