= Sadat Mahalleh, Chaf =

Village in Gilan province, Iran

Sadat Mahalleh Persian: سادات محله
- Village
- Location within Iran
- Coordinates: 37°14′16″N 50°10′00″E
- Country: Iran
- Province: Gilan
- County: Langarud
- District: Central
- Rural District: Chaf

Population (2016)
  - Total: 821
- Time zone: UTC+3:30 (IRST)

Sadat Mahalleh (Persian: سادات محله) (Note: Also romanized as Sādāt Maḩalleh; also known as Sa‘dat and Sadat Mahalleh Hoomeh) is a village in Chaf Rural District of the Central District in Langarud County, Gilan province, Iran.

== Demographics ==
=== Population ===
At the time of the 2006 National Census, the village's population was 950 in 267 households. The following census in 2011 counted 903 people in 306 households. The 2016 census measured the population of the village as 821 people in 296 households. It was the most populous village in its rural district.
