= Sadat Mahalleh, Tehran =

Village in Tehran province, Iran

Sadat Mahalleh Persian: سادات محله
- Village
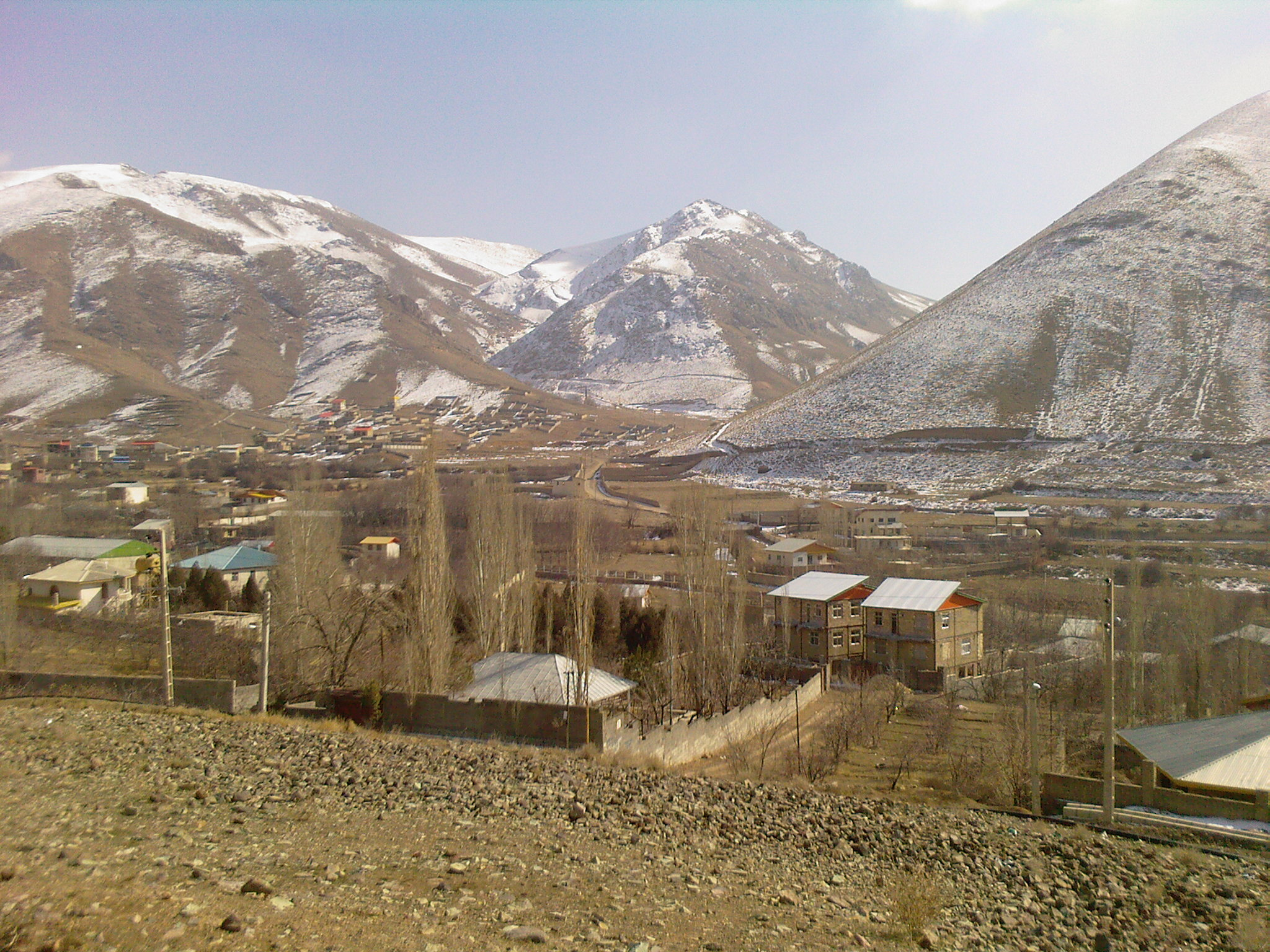
- The village of Sadat Mahalleh

- Location within Iran
- Coordinates: 35°44′39″N 51°57′23″E
- Country: Iran
- Province: Tehran
- County: Damavand
- District: Rudehen
- Rural District: Abali
- Elevation: 1,950–2,000 m (6,400–6,560 ft)

Population (2016)
  - Total: 1,397
- Time zone: UTC+3:30 (IRST)

Sadat Mahalleh (Persian: سادات محله) (Note: Also romanized as Sadat Mahaleh and Sādāt Maḩalleh; also known as Said Mahalleh and Seyyed Maḩalleh) is a village in Abali Rural District of Rudehen District in Damavand County, Tehran province, Iran.

== Demographics ==
=== Population ===
At the time of the 2006 National Census, the village's population was 1,396 in 380 households. The following census in 2011 counted 1,410 people in 402 households. The 2016 census measured the population of the village as 1,397 people in 436 households. It was the most populous village in its rural district.
