= Rudehen, Iran =

City in Tehran province, Iran

Rudehen Persian: رودهن
- City
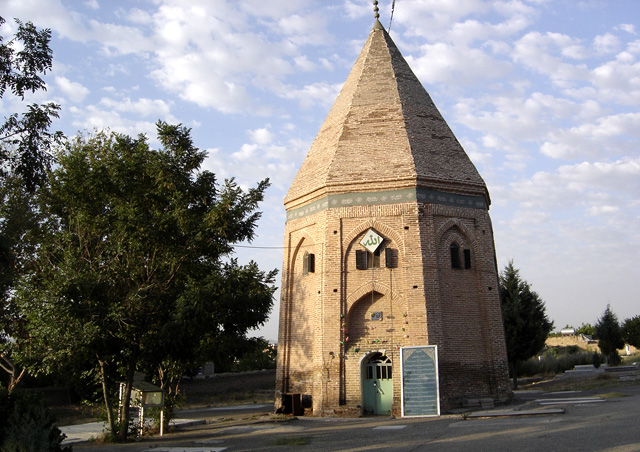
- Imamzadeh Sultan Mutahhar in Bumahen neighborhood of Rudehen

- Location within Iran
- Coordinates: 35°44′08″N 51°54′26″E
- Country: Iran
- Province: Tehran
- County: Damavand
- District: Rudehen

Population (2016)
  - Total: 28,533
- Time zone: UTC+3:30 (IRST)

Rudehen (Persian: رودهن) (Note: Also romanized as Rūd-e Hen and Rūdehen; also known as Rūdīān) is a city in, and the capital of, Rudehen District of Damavand County, Tehran province, Iran.

== Demographics ==
=== Population ===
Rudehen's municipality was founded in 1965. According to the 1976 National Census, the population of Rudehen and suburbs was 5,237, out of which 6.57% lived in the town and the remainder in the surrounding villages. Rudehen had a population of about 12,000 when the Islamic Azad University (IAU) was founded in 1983. They were mostly local, established families who, until the university development, comprised the village population. Local commuting patterns, housing, and job development increased dramatically with the establishment of the university.

At the time of the 2006 National Census, the city's population was 19,535 in 5,693 households. The following census in 2011 counted 21,477 people in 6,627 households. The 2016 census measured the population of the city as 28,533 people in 9,150 households.

== Overview ==
Rudehen is just past the fork between Haraz and Firoozkooh roads. The Alborz mountain range sits to the North. It is surrounded by mountains to the North, and Mt. Ghorch, Mt. Soori, and others to the South separating it from the central plateau of Iran. It is 1850 meters above the sea level and has a total area of 50 square kilometers. Imamzadeh Sultan Mutahhar is an historical mausoleum located in the Bumehen neighborhood, rebuilt in the 15th century and containing the tomb of the murdered son of Jafar as Sadiq, the 6th Shia Imam.

Before the construction of Tehran-Mazandaran Road, the area was called Damavand in historic reference. After the construction of the road in 1903, however, Rudehen was referred to as a place for rest midway of the road. As an example, in Matla-ol-shams written by Sani-al-doleh, it reads: "Rudehen is about 3 kilometers away from Bumahen near the Ah river and is on the left side of the road. It has 15 families, all are immigrants from Urmieh". Sani-al-doleh in 1875 and British Oliver Darsi in 1830 both passed the road and mentioned the name of the villages which are now part of the town or the surrounding areas.

In the eastern part, the village of Kreiton and Ana building complex are now part of Rudehen. The villages of Mehrabad and Golahak are being encroached upon by development accelerated by the construction of the Islamic Azad University.

== Colleges and universities ==
- Islamic Azad University, Rudehen Branch
- Islamic Azad University Rudehen Branch (RIAU)
- Faculty of Agriculture, Islamic Azad University of Rudehen

Faculty of English Language and Literature (FELL) in this university with 3000 students is said to be the largest one in the Middle East.
