= Gandak, Tehran =

Village in Tehran province, Iran

Gandak Persian: گندك
- Village
- Country: Iran
- Province: Tehran
- County: Damavand
- District: Rudehen
- Rural District: Mehrabad

Population (2016)
  - Total: 13
- Time zone: UTC+3:30 (IRST)

Gandak (Persian: گندك) (Note: Also romanized as Gandaḵ) is a village in Mehrabad Rural District of Rudehen District in Damavand County, Tehran province, Iran.

== Demographics ==
=== Population ===
At the time of the 2006 National Census, the village's population was 30 in 11 households. The following census in 2011 counted 34 people in 13 households. The 2016 census measured the population of the village as 13 people in four households.
