= Cheshmehha, Rudbar-e Jonubi =

Cheshmehha چشمه ها
- Village
- Location within Iran
- Coordinates: 27°59′56″N 58°31′39″E
- Country: Iran
- Province: Kerman
- County: Rudbar-e Jonubi
- Bakhsh: Jazmurian
- Rural District: Kuhestan

Population (2006)
  - Total: 150
- Time zone: UTC+3:30 (IRST)
  - Summer (DST): UTC+4:30 (IRDT)

Cheshmehha (Persian: چشمه ها, also Romanized as Cheshmehhā) is a village in Kuhestan Rural District, Jazmurian District, Rudbar-e Jonubi County, Kerman Province, Iran. At the 2006 census its population was 150, in 38 families.
