= Sadat Mahalleh, Baladeh =

Sadat Mahalleh سادات محله
- Village
- Location within Iran
- Coordinates: 36°11′13″N 51°51′34″E
- Country: Iran
- Province: Mazandaran
- County: Nur
- Bakhsh: Baladeh
- Rural District: Sheykh Fazlolah-e Nuri

Population (2006)
  - Total: 28
- Time zone: UTC+3:30 (IRST)
  - Summer (DST): UTC+4:30 (IRDT)

Sadat Mahalleh (Persian: سادات محله, also Romanized as Sādāt Maḩalleh; also known as Kūseh Maḩalleh) is a village in Sheykh Fazlolah-e Nuri Rural District, Baladeh District, Nur County, Mazandaran Province, Iran. At the 2006 census, its population was 28, in 10 families.
