= Chamkhaleh Port =

Chamkhaleh Tourism Port
- Interactive map of Chamkhaleh Tourism Port

Location
- Country: Iran
- Location: Langarud County; Gilan Province

Details
- Opened: 2018
- Owned by: Ports and Maritime Organization
- Type of Harbor: Tourism
- Size: 2 berths

Chamkhaleh Port is the first specialized tourism port in Iran, located in the city of Chaf and Chamkhaleh, Langarud County, Gilan Province. According to Lahouti, the representative of Langarud, the project is scheduled to be inaugurated this year.

Construction of this port, covering an area of 20 hectares, began in 2018, commissioned by the Ports and Maritime Organization and carried out by Khatam al-Anbiya Construction Headquarters.
