= Gol Sefid, Andika =

Gol Sefid گل سفيد
- Village
- Location within Iran
- Coordinates: 32°17′42″N 49°26′02″E
- Country: Iran
- Province: Khuzestan
- County: Andika
- Bakhsh: Central
- Rural District: Qaleh-ye Khvajeh

Population (2006)
  - Total: 79
- Time zone: UTC+3:30 (IRST)
  - Summer (DST): UTC+4:30 (IRDT)

Gol Sefid (Persian: گل سفيد, also Romanized as Gol Sefīd; also known as Galak-e Sefīd) is a village in Qaleh-ye Khvajeh Rural District, in the Central District of Andika County, Khuzestan Province, Iran. At the 2006 census, its population was 79, in 8 families.
