= Abali =

City in Tehran province, Iran

Abali Persian: آبعلی
- City
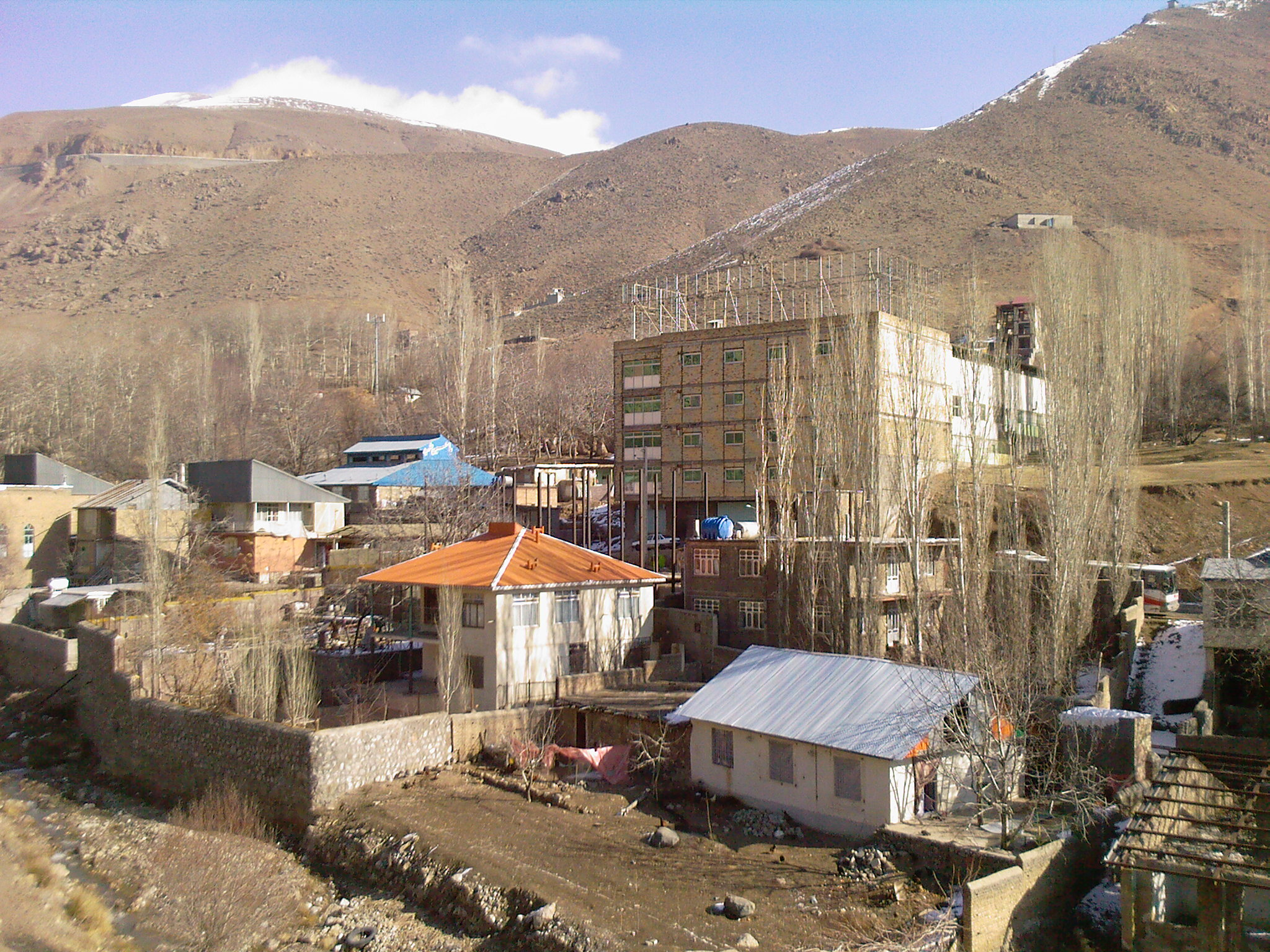
- Landscape in the city of Abali

- Location within Iran
- Coordinates: 35°46′11″N 51°58′00″E
- Country: Iran
- Province: Tehran
- County: Damavand
- District: Rudehen
- Established as a city: 2005

Population (2016)
  - Total: 2,758
- Time zone: UTC+3:30 (IRST)

Abali (Persian: آبعلی) (Note: Also romanized as Ābʿalī) is a city in Rudehen District of Damavand County, Tehran province, Iran, serving as the administrative center for Abali Rural District. In 2005, the village of Abali merged with the village of Mobarakabad (مبارک‌آباد) and the population centers of Sarpulak (سرپولک) and Qaim Mahalleh (قایم‌محله) (also known as Qapuz Mahalleh [قاپوزمحله‌]) to form the city of Abali.

== Demographics ==
=== Population ===
At the time of the 2006 National Census, the city's population was 2,607 in 727 households. The following census in 2011 counted 2,522 people in 766 households. The 2016 census measured the population of the city as 2,758 people in 875 households.

== Climate ==
Climate data for Abali ( normals 1983-2010, extremes and rain/snow days 1983-2005 )
Month	Jan	Feb	Mar	Apr	May	Jun	Jul	Aug	Sep	Oct	Nov	Dec	Year
Record high °C (°F)	10.2 (50.4)	11.0 (51.8)	16.2 (61.2)	22.8 (73.0)	25.4 (77.7)	30.5 (86.9)	31.6 (88.9)	32.2 (90.0)	28.0 (82.4)	22.8 (73.0)	15.6 (60.1)	16.2 (61.2)	32.2 (90.0)
Mean daily maximum °C (°F)	0.3 (32.5)	1.1 (34.0)	4.9 (40.8)	11.5 (52.7)	16.7 (62.1)	23.1 (73.6)	26.3 (79.3)	25.9 (78.6)	21.9 (71.4)	14.9 (58.8)	7.4 (45.3)	2.4 (36.3)	13.0 (55.4)
Daily mean °C (°F)	−3.7 (25.3)	−2.9 (26.8)	1.0 (33.8)	7.2 (45.0)	12.1 (53.8)	17.8 (64.0)	21.1 (70.0)	20.6 (69.1)	16.7 (62.1)	10.4 (50.7)	3.6 (38.5)	−1.3 (29.7)	8.6 (47.4)
Mean daily minimum °C (°F)	−7.6 (18.3)	−6.9 (19.6)	−2.9 (26.8)	2.9 (37.2)	7.5 (45.5)	12.6 (54.7)	15.8 (60.4)	15.3 (59.5)	11.5 (52.7)	5.8 (42.4)	−0.1 (31.8)	−4.9 (23.2)	4.1 (39.3)
Record low °C (°F)	−19.0 (−2.2)	−18.8 (−1.8)	−26.6 (−15.9)	−9.5 (14.9)	−4.6 (23.7)	0.5 (32.9)	6.0 (42.8)	6.0 (42.8)	3.0 (37.4)	−3.6 (25.5)	−12.0 (10.4)	−16.5 (2.3)	−26.6 (−15.9)
Average precipitation mm (inches)	63.2 (2.49)	74.4 (2.93)	96.7 (3.81)	66.1 (2.60)	44.5 (1.75)	10.8 (0.43)	10.9 (0.43)	9.5 (0.37)	7.5 (0.30)	24.5 (0.96)	57.3 (2.26)	67.0 (2.64)	532.4 (20.97)
Average rainy days	12.4	12.6	14.9	11.9	10.9	3.8	4.6	2.2	2.0	6.0	10.5	12.3	104.1
Average snowy days	11.9	11.8	11.7	3.4	0.7	0	0	0	0	0.6	5.9	11.7	57.7
Average relative humidity (%)	66	66	62	52	44	33	32	31	32	44	58	66	49
Mean monthly sunshine hours	170.4	163	179.7	209.1	270	326	325.5	333.1	305.1	252.6	179.5	160	2,874
Source: Iran meteorological organization

== Gallery ==
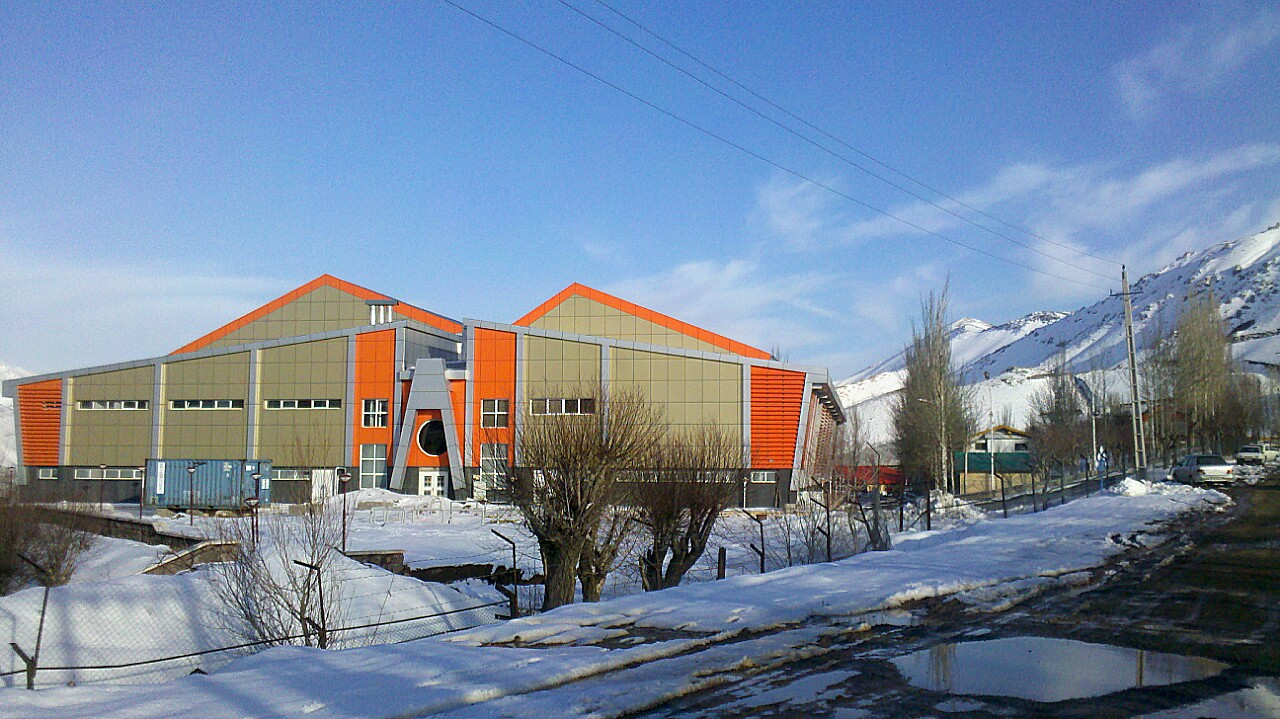
Ab'ali ski resort inside

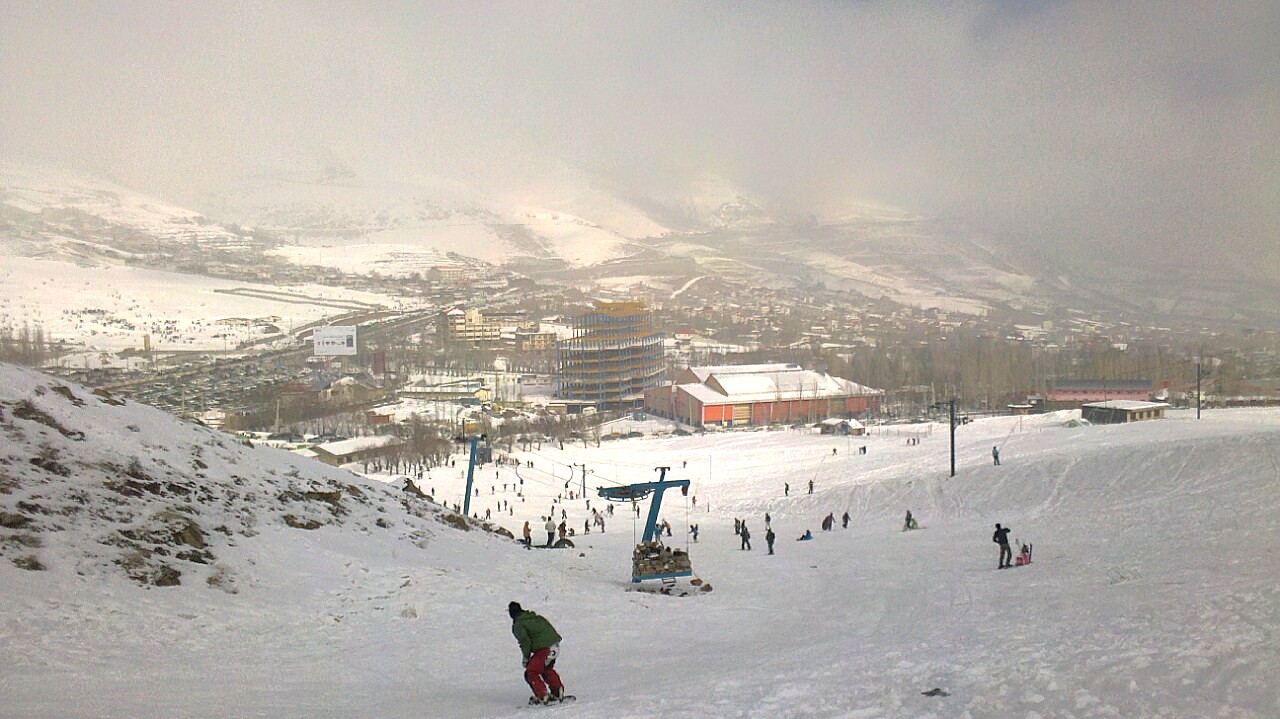

== See also ==
Media related to Abali at Wikimedia Commons
