= Shahrak-e Gel Sefid =

Shahrak-e Gel Sefid شهرك گل سفيد
- Village
- Location within Iran
- Coordinates: 31°54′07″N 50°36′26″E
- Country: Iran
- Province: Chaharmahal and Bakhtiari
- County: Kiar
- Bakhsh: Naghan
- Rural District: Mashayekh

Population (2006)
  - Total: 406
- Time zone: UTC+3:30 (IRST)
  - Summer (DST): UTC+4:30 (IRDT)

Shahrak-e Gel Sefid (Persian: شهرك گل سفيد, also Romanized as Shahrak-e Gel Sefīd; also known as Galli Sūr, Gel-e Sefīd, Gel Sefīd, Gol-e Sefīd, and Gol Sefīd) is a village in Mashayekh Rural District, Naghan District, Kiar County, Chaharmahal and Bakhtiari Province, Iran. At the 2006 census, its population was 406, in 93 families. The village is populated by Lurs.
