= Gel Sefid, Kermanshah =

Gel Sefid گل سفيد
- Village
- Location within Iran
- Coordinates: 34°42′48″N 46°38′42″E
- Country: Iran
- Province: Kermanshah
- County: Ravansar
- Bakhsh: Central
- Rural District: Badr

Population (2006)
  - Total: 1,530
- Time zone: UTC+3:30 (IRST)
  - Summer (DST): UTC+4:30 (IRDT)

Gel Sefid (Persian: گل سفيد, also Romanized as Gel Sefīd and Gel Safīd; also known as Gala Safīd and Qala Safid) is a village in Badr Rural District, in the Central District of Ravansar County, Kermanshah Province, Iran. At the 2006 census, its population was 1,530, in 353 families.
