= Divshal Rural District =

Rural district in Gilan province, Iran

Divshal Rural District Persian: دهستان ديوشل
- Rural District
- Location within Iran
- Coordinates: 37°12′N 50°07′E
- Country: Iran
- Province: Gilan
- County: Langarud
- District: Central
- Established: 1987
- Capital: Divshal

Population (2016)
  - Total: 10,261
- Time zone: UTC+3:30 (IRST)

Divshal Rural District (Persian: دهستان ديوشل) is in the Central District of Langarud County, Gilan province, Iran. Its capital is the village of Divshal.

== Demographics ==
=== Population ===
At the time of the 2006 National Census, the rural district's population was 10,179 in 2,930 households. There were 10,313 inhabitants in 3,344 households at the following census of 2011. The 2016 census measured the population of the rural district as 10,261 in 3,604 households. The most populous of its 22 villages was Divshal, with 2,094 people.

=== Other villages in the rural district ===
- Abchalagi
- Akhund Mahalleh
- Bala Mahalleh-ye Nalkiashar
- Bazar Deh-e Gol Bagh
- Divshal Poshteh
- Esmail Sara
- Galesh Kalam-e Leyla Kuh
- Hajj Ebrahim Deh
- Jodanukar
- Khalia Gol
- Kharrat Mahalleh
- Kushal Shad
- Leyla Kuh
- Lukolayeh
- Mubandan
- Pain Mahalleh-ye Nalkiashar
- Sadat Mahalleh
- Siah Kaldeh
- Talesh Mahalleh
