= Langarud =

City in Gilan province, Iran

Langarud Persian: لنگرود
- City
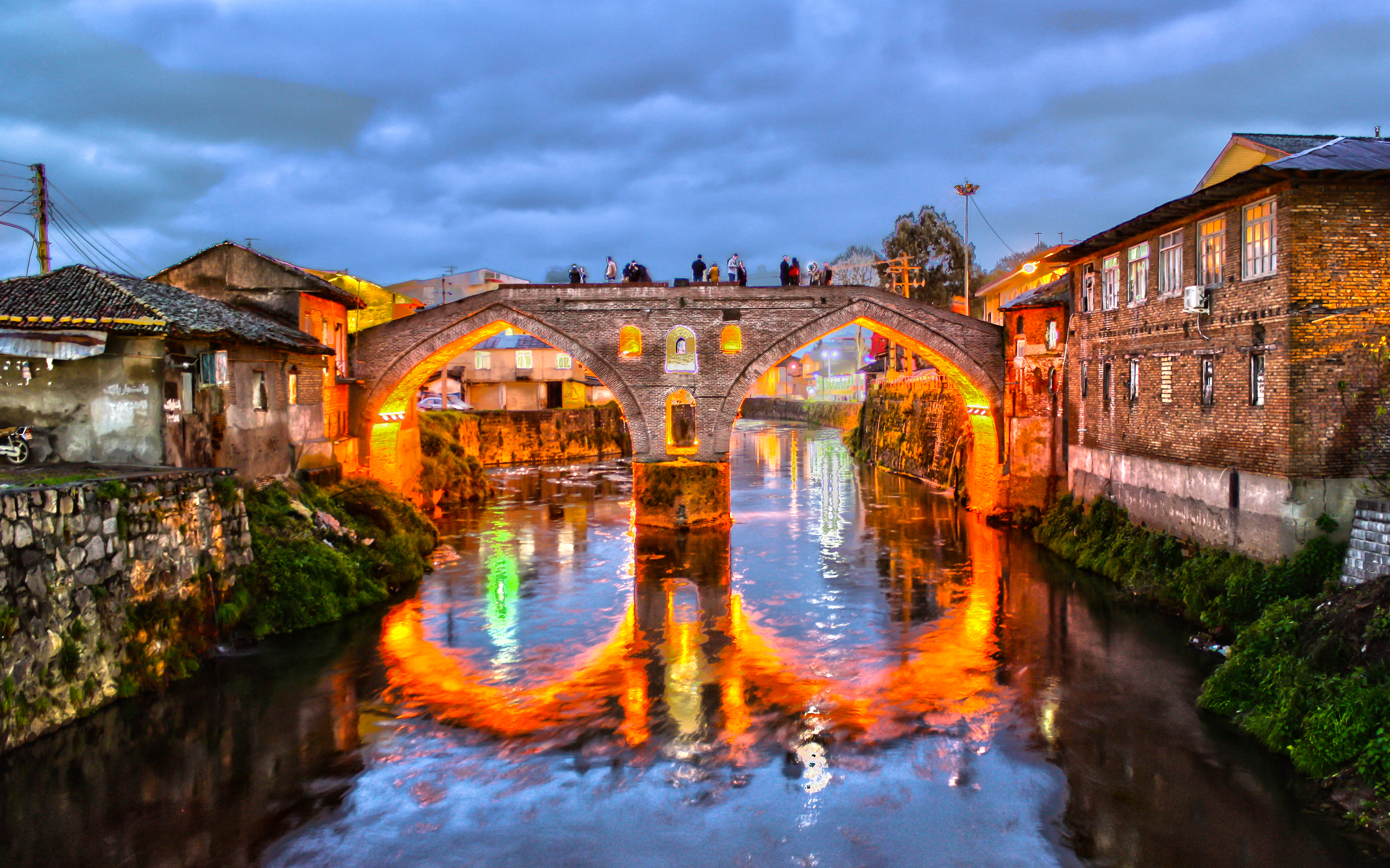
- Clay Bridge "(Pol Kheshti)" of Langarud

- Location within Iran
- Coordinates: 37°11′28″N 50°09′20″E
- Country: Iran
- Province: Gilan
- County: Langarud
- District: Central

Population (2016)
  - Total: 79,445
- Time zone: UTC+3:30 (IRST)

Langarud (Persian: لنگرود) (Note: Also romanized as Langarood, Langaroud, Langarūd, and Langerūd; also known as Langaru (Gilaki: لنگرۊ)) is a city in the Central District of Langarud County, Gilan province, Iran, serving as capital of both the county and the district.

== Demographics ==
=== Population ===
At the time of the 2006 National Census, the city's population was 65,369 in 18,875 households. The following census in 2011 counted 74,477 people in 23,864 households. The 2016 census measured the population of the city as 79,445 people in 27,318 households.

== Geography ==
=== Location ===
Langarud is on the south coast of the Caspian Sea, 58 km (36 miles) east of Rasht, the provincial capital and 14 km (8.7 miles) east of Lahijan. One of the most important tourist attractions of Langarud is the coast of Chamkhaleh, located 10.3 km (6.4 miles) northeast of the city.

The old city is divided in two parts by Langeroud river. When Nader Shah was the king, Langerud had been one of the most important dockyards in the north of Iran. The most famous archaeological place in Langerud is the Clay Bridge (Pole Kheshti), a historical bridge across the Langerud river.

=== Climate ===
Langarud has a humid subtropical climate (Köppen: Cfa, Trewartha: Cf), with warm, humid summers and cool, damp winters.

Climate data for Langerud
Month	Jan	Feb	Mar	Apr	May	Jun	Jul	Aug	Sep	Oct	Nov	Dec	Year
Mean daily maximum °C (°F)	10.4 (50.7)	10.2 (50.4)	12.0 (53.6)	17.4 (63.3)	22.7 (72.9)	27.1 (80.8)	29.6 (85.3)	29.1 (84.4)	26.1 (79.0)	21.3 (70.3)	17.3 (63.1)	13.2 (55.8)	19.7 (67.5)
Mean daily minimum °C (°F)	2.7 (36.9)	3.1 (37.6)	5.4 (41.7)	9.6 (49.3)	14.6 (58.3)	18.6 (65.5)	21.0 (69.8)	20.7 (69.3)	18.1 (64.6)	13.7 (56.7)	9.2 (48.6)	5.1 (41.2)	11.8 (53.3)
Average precipitation mm (inches)	125.6 (4.94)	98.8 (3.89)	97.8 (3.85)	54.0 (2.13)	49.0 (1.93)	43.4 (1.71)	38.1 (1.50)	79.3 (3.12)	152.6 (6.01)	258.5 (10.18)	180.6 (7.11)	153.5 (6.04)	1,331.2 (52.41)
Average precipitation days	12.4	12	14.9	12	10.9	6.7	5.5	8.5	11.1	13.9	11.9	12.3	132.1
Average relative humidity (%)	84	85	85.6	82.7	80.9	76.8	75.5	78.4	82.3	85.4	85	84.6	82.2
Average dew point °C (°F)	4.0 (39.2)	4.3 (39.7)	6.4 (43.5)	10.6 (51.1)	15.3 (59.5)	18.5 (65.3)	20.7 (69.3)	20.9 (69.6)	18.9 (66.0)	15.0 (59.0)	10.7 (51.3)	6.6 (43.9)	12.7 (54.8)
Mean monthly sunshine hours	111.6	96	86.8	132	182.9	222	226.3	189.1	150	120.9	111	102.3	1,730.9
Mean daily sunshine hours	3.6	3.4	2.8	4.4	5.9	7.4	7.3	6.1	5	3.9	3.7	3.3	4.7
Percentage possible sunshine	32.7	29.3	22.1	31.2	39.2	47.5	47.4	41.9	37.2	32.3	33.5	31.2	35.5
Source: Weatherbase Weather2visit
