= Kileh Sefid, Kurdistan =

Kileh Sefid كيله سفيد
- Village
- Location within Iran
- Coordinates: 35°37′42″N 47°11′09″E
- Country: Iran
- Province: Kurdistan
- County: Divandarreh
- Bakhsh: Saral
- Rural District: Hoseynabad-e Shomali

Population (2006)
  - Total: 133
- Time zone: UTC+3:30 (IRST)
  - Summer (DST): UTC+4:30 (IRDT)

Kileh Sefid (Persian: كيله سفيد, also Romanized as Kīleh Sefīd and Keyleh Sefīd; also known as Greylā Harmān, Kal-i-Sefīd, Kelāiarman, and Kelājarmān) is a village in Hoseynabad-e Shomali Rural District, Saral District, Divandarreh County, Kurdistan Province, Iran. At the 2006 census, its population was 133, in 31 families. The village is populated by Kurds.
