= Gol Sefid, Lorestan =

Gol Sefid گل سفيد
- Village
- Location within Iran
- Coordinates: 33°10′02″N 49°15′44″E
- Country: Iran
- Province: Lorestan
- County: Aligudarz
- Bakhsh: Zaz and Mahru
- Rural District: Zaz-e Sharqi

Population (2006)
  - Total: 93
- Time zone: UTC+3:30 (IRST)
  - Summer (DST): UTC+4:30 (IRDT)

Gol Sefid (Persian: گل سفيد, also Romanized as Gol Sefīd) is a village in Zaz-e Sharqi Rural District, Zaz and Mahru District, Aligudarz County, Lorestan Province, Iran. At the 2006 census, its population was 93, in 17 families.
