= Kal Sefid, Kermanshah =

Kal Sefid كل سفيد
- Village
- Location within Iran
- Coordinates: 34°51′44″N 47°22′45″E
- Country: Iran
- Province: Kermanshah
- County: Sonqor
- Bakhsh: Kolyai
- Rural District: Satar

Population (2006)
  - Total: 227
- Time zone: UTC+3:30 (IRST)
  - Summer (DST): UTC+4:30 (IRDT)

Kal Sefid (Persian: كل سفيد, also Romanized as Kal Sefīd and Kal Safīd; also known as Gel Safīd and Gel Sefied) is a village in Satar Rural District, Kolyai District, Sonqor County, Kermanshah Province, Iran. At the 2006 census, its population was 227, in 63 families.
