= Kileh Sefid, Kermanshah =

Kileh Sefid كيله سفيد
- Village
- Location within Iran
- Coordinates: 34°44′47″N 45°51′14″E
- Country: Iran
- Province: Kermanshah
- County: Salas-e Babajani
- Bakhsh: Ozgoleh
- Rural District: Jeygaran

Population (2006)
  - Total: 149
- Time zone: UTC+3:30 (IRST)
  - Summer (DST): UTC+4:30 (IRDT)

Kileh Sefid (Persian: كيله سفيد, also Romanized as Kīleh Sefīd; also known as Kal-e Sefīd, Kel-e Sefīd, Qal’eh Safīd, Qal‘eh Sefīd, and Qal‘eh-ye Safīd) is a village in Jeygaran Rural District, Ozgoleh District, Salas-e Babajani County, Kermanshah Province, Iran. At the 2006 census, its population was 149, in 34 families.
