= Chaf Rural District =

Rural district in Gilan province, Iran

Chaf Rural District Persian: دهستان چاف
- Rural District
- Location within Iran
- Coordinates: 37°15′N 50°12′E
- Country: Iran
- Province: Gilan
- County: Langarud
- District: Central
- Established: 1987
- Capital: Chaf and Chamkhaleh

Population (2016)
  - Total: 2,395
- Time zone: UTC+3:30 (IRST)

Chaf Rural District (Persian: دهستان چاف) is in the Central District of Langarud County, Gilan province, Iran. It is administered from the city of Chaf and Chamkhaleh. (Note: Formerly the village of Chaf-e Pain)

== Demographics ==
=== Population ===
At the time of the 2006 National Census, the rural district's population was 9,834 in 2,917 households. There were 6,961 inhabitants in 2,389 households at the following census of 2011. The 2016 census measured the population of the rural district as 2,395 in 904 households. The most populous of its six villages was Sadat Mahalleh, with 821 people.

=== Other villages in the rural district ===
- Bala Pap Kiadeh
- Hasanabad
- Khal Kiasar
- Poshtaleh-ye Sar
- Tazehabad
