= Gel-e Sefid Rural District =

Rural district in Gilan province, Iran

Gel-e Sefid Rural District Persian: دهستان گل سفيد
- Rural District
- Location within Iran
- Coordinates: 37°11′N 50°13′E
- Country: Iran
- Province: Gilan
- County: Langarud
- District: Central
- Established: 1987
- Capital: Gel-e Sefid

Population (2016)
  - Total: 2,341
- Time zone: UTC+3:30 (IRST)

Gel-e Sefid Rural District (Persian: دهستان گل سفيد) is in the Central District of Langarud County, Gilan province, Iran. Its capital is the village of Gel-e Sefid.

== Demographics ==
=== Population ===
At the time of the 2006 National Census, the rural district's population was 5,347 in 1,753 households. There were 2,776 inhabitants in 1,028 households at the following census of 2011. The 2016 census measured the population of the rural district as 2,341 in 954 households. The most populous of its four villages was Darya Kenar, with 830 people.

=== Other villages in the rural district ===
- Fatideh
- Galesh Khaleh
