= Rudehen District =

District in Tehran province, Iran

Rudehen District Persian: بخش رودهن
- District
- Location within Iran
- Coordinates: 35°46′13″N 51°55′31″E
- Country: Iran
- Province: Tehran
- County: Damavand
- Established: 1996
- Capital: Rudehen

Population (2016)
  - Total: 41,104
- Time zone: UTC+3:30 (IRST)
- Website: www.damavand.gov.ir

Rudehen District (Persian: بخش رودهن) is in Damavand County, Tehran province, Iran. Its capital is the city of Rudehen.

== Demographics ==
=== Population ===
At the time of the 2006 National Census, the district's population was 27,031 in 7,776 households. The following census in 2011 counted 29,330 people in 8,939 households. The 2016 census measured the population of the district as 41,104 inhabitants in 13,035 households.

=== Administrative divisions ===
Rudehen District Population
| Administrative Divisions | 2006 | 2011 | 2016 |
|---|---|---|---|
| Abali RD | 2,047 | 2,537 | 2,902 |
| Mehrabad RD | 2,842 | 2,794 | 6,911 |
| Abali (city) | 2,607 | 2,522 | 2,758 |
| Rudehen (city) | 19,535 | 21,477 | 28,533 |
| Total | 27,031 | 29,330 | 41,104 |
RD = Rural District
