= Central District (Langarud County) =

District in Gilan province, Iran

Central District (Langarud County) Persian: بخش مرکزی شهرستان لنگرود
- District
- Location within Iran
- Coordinates: 37°14′N 50°10′E
- Country: Iran
- Province: Gilan
- County: Langarud
- Capital: Langarud

Population (2016)
  - Total: 103,282
- Time zone: UTC+3:30 (IRST)

The Central District of Langarud County (Persian: بخش مرکزی شهرستان لنگرود) is in the northwestern Iranian province of Gilan. Its capital is the city of Langarud.

== History ==
In 2009, the village of Chaf-e Pain merged with several villages merged to form the new city of Chaf and Chamkhaleh.

== Demographics ==
=== Population ===
At the time of the 2006 census, the district's population was 90,729 in 26,475 households. The following census in 2011 counted 99,021 people in 32,061 households. The 2016 census measured the population of the district as 103,282 inhabitants in 35,917 households.

=== Administrative divisions ===
Central District (Langarud County) Population
Administrative Divisions	2006	2011	2016
Chaf RD	9,834	6,961	2,395
Divshal RD	10,179	10,313	10,261
Gel-e Sefid RD	5,347	2,776	2,341
Chaf and Chamkhaleh (city) (Note: Formerly the village of Chaf-e Pain)		4,494	8,840
Langarud (city)	65,369	74,477	79,445
Total	90,729	99,021	103,282
RD = Rural District
