= Ateshun =

Ateshun (Persian: اتشون) may refer to:

- Ateshun, Bardsir, Kerman Province
- Ateshun-e Namju, Kerman Province
- Ateshun-e Olya, Kerman Province
- Ateshun, Tehran

== See also ==
- Atashan (disambiguation)
