= Atashan =

Atashan or Ateshan (Persian: اتشان) may refer to:

- Ateshan, Kerman
- Atashan, Anbarabad, Kerman Province
- Atashan, Tehran

== See also ==
- Ateshun (disambiguation)
