= Dami =

Dami may refer to:

- Dami, Nepal, a village and municipality
- Dami (name)
- Dami Aqa, a village in Iran
- Dami Mission in South Korea
- Jabal Umm ad Dami, the highest mountain in Jordan
- "Dami Duro", a song by Nigerian recording artist Davido
- Dami Im, eponymous album by Dami Im

== See also ==
- Dhami (disambiguation)
