= Ali Arab =

Ali Arab (Persian: علي عرب) may refer to:

- Ali Arab, Isfahan
- Ali Arab, Khuzestan

== See also ==
- Arab Ali
