= Kar Gavaneh =

Kar Gavaneh كرگوانه
- Village
- Location within Iran
- Coordinates: 35°41′15″N 52°58′09″E
- Country: Iran
- Province: Tehran
- County: Firuzkuh
- Bakhsh: Central
- Rural District: Poshtkuh

Population (2016)
  - Total: 84
- Time zone: UTC+3:30 (IRST)

Kar Gavaneh (Persian: كرگوانه, also Romanized as Kar Gabeneh and Gargabīneh) is a village in Poshtkuh Rural District, in the Central District of Firuzkuh County, Tehran Province, Iran.

At the time of the 2006 National Census, the village's population was 89. The following census in 2011 counted 130 people in 41 households. The 2016 census measured the population of the village as 84 people in 33 households.
