= Kadudeh =

Kadudeh كدوده
- village
- Location within Iran
- Coordinates: 35°36′32″N 52°43′32″E
- Country: Iran
- Province: Tehran
- County: Firuzkuh
- Bakhsh: Central
- Rural District: Poshtkuh
- Elevation: 2,250 m (7,380 ft)

Population (2016)
  - Total: 51
- Time zone: UTC+3:30 (IRST)

Kadudeh (Persian: كدوده, also Romanized as Kadūdeh) is a village in Poshtkuh Rural District, in the Central District of Firuzkuh County, Tehran Province, Iran.

At the time of the 2006 National Census, the village's population was 129 in 39 households. The following census in 2011 counted 179 people in 58 households. The 2016 census measured the population of the village as 51 people in 22 households.
