= Simindasht =

Village in Tehran province, Iran

Simindasht Persian: سيمين‌دشت
- Village

- Location within Iran
- Coordinates: 35°31′33″N 52°30′00″E
- Country: Iran
- Province: Tehran
- County: Firuzkuh
- District: Central
- Rural District: Hablerud
- Elevation: 1,460 m (4,790 ft)

Population (2016)
  - Total: 267
- Time zone: UTC+3:30 (IRST)

Simindasht (Persian: سيمين‌دشت) (Note: Also romanized as Sīmīndasht) is a village in Hablerud Rural District of the Central District in Firuzkuh County, Tehran province, Iran.

== Demographics ==
=== Population ===
At the time of the 2006 National Census, the village's population was 313 in 100 households. The following census in 2011 counted 297 people in 106 households. The 2016 census measured the population of the village as 267 people in 103 households.
