= Kalar Khan-e Bala =

Kalar Khan-e Bala كلارخان بالا
- Village
- Location within Iran
- Coordinates: 35°45′00″N 52°57′00″E
- Country: Iran
- Province: Tehran
- County: Firuzkuh
- Bakhsh: Central
- Rural District: Poshtkuh

Population (2016)
  - Total: 58
- Time zone: UTC+3:30 (IRST)

Kalar Khan-e Bala (Persian: كلارخان بالا, also Romanized as Kalār Khān-e Bālā; also known as Kalār Khān) is a village in Poshtkuh Rural District, in the Central District of Firuzkuh County, Tehran Province, Iran.

At the time of the 2006 National Census, the village's population was 62 in 15 households. The following census in 2011 counted 17 people in 6 households, it was stated that most of the villagers reside from May to November. The 2016 census measured the population of the village as 58 people in 21 households.
