= Saranza =

Village in Tehran province, Iran

Saranza Persian: سرانزا
- Village
- Location within Iran
- Coordinates: 35°45′26″N 52°53′47″E
- Country: Iran
- Province: Tehran
- County: Firuzkuh
- District: Central
- Rural District: Poshtkuh
- Elevation: 2,100 m (6,900 ft)

Population (2016)
  - Total: 122
- Time zone: UTC+3:30 (IRST)

Saranza (Persian: سرانزا) (Note: Also romanized as Sarānzā; also known as Sar Nezā‘ and Sarānzhā) is a village in, and the capital of, Poshtkuh Rural District in the Central District of Firuzkuh County, Tehran province, Iran.

== Demographics ==
=== Population ===
At the time of the 2006 National Census, the village's population was 333 in 93 households. The following census in 2011 counted 192 people in 66 households. The 2016 census measured the population of the village as 122 people in 43 households.
