= Mahabad, Tehran =

Village in Tehran province, Iran

Mahabad Persian: مهاباد
- Village
- Location within Iran
- Coordinates: 35°39′44″N 52°42′36″E
- Country: Iran
- Province: Tehran
- County: Firuzkuh
- District: Central
- Rural District: Shahrabad
- Elevation: 1,780 m (5,840 ft)

Population (2016)
  - Total: 318
- Time zone: UTC+3:30 (IRST)

Mahabad (Persian: مه‌آباد) (Note: Also romanized as Mahābād; Tati: (ماها), romanized as Mâhâ) is a village in Shahrabad Rural District of the Central District in Firuzkuh County, Tehran province, Iran.

== Demographics ==
=== Language and ethnicity ===
The people of Mahabad belong to the Tat ethnic group and speak the Tati language.

=== Population ===
At the time of the 2006 National Census, the village's population was 737 in 170 households. The following census in 2011 counted 393 people in 136 households. The 2016 census measured the population of the village as 318 people in 146 households.
