= Harandeh =

Village in Tehran province, Iran

Harandeh Persian: هرانده
- Village
- Location within Iran
- Coordinates: 35°42′25″N 52°40′45″E
- Country: Iran
- Province: Tehran
- County: Firuzkuh
- District: Central
- Rural District: Shahrabad
- Elevation: 1,820 m (5,970 ft)

Population (2016)
  - Total: 415
- Time zone: UTC+3:30 (IRST)

Harandeh (Persian: هرانده) (Note: Also romanized as Harāndeh; also known as Haram Deh) is a village in Shahrabad Rural District of the Central District in Firuzkuh County, Tehran province, Iran.

== Demographics ==
=== Population ===
At the time of the 2006 National Census, the village's population was 437 in 120 households. The following census in 2011 counted 369 people in 125 households. The 2016 census measured the population of the village as 415 people in 148 households.
