= Hesar Bon =

Village in Tehran province, Iran

Hesar Bon Persian: حصاربن
- Village
- Location within Iran
- Coordinates: 35°33′45″N 52°29′04″E
- Country: Iran
- Province: Tehran
- County: Firuzkuh
- District: Central
- Rural District: Hablerud
- Elevation: 1,540 m (5,050 ft)

Population (2016)
  - Total: 439
- Time zone: UTC+3:30 (IRST)

Hesar Bon (Persian: حصاربن) (Note: Also romanized as Ḩeşār Bon) is a village in Hablerud Rural District of the Central District in Firuzkuh County, Tehran province, Iran.

== Demographics ==
=== Population ===
At the time of the 2006 National Census, the village's population was 946 in 284 households. The following census in 2011 counted 550 people in 223 households. The 2016 census measured the population of the village as 439 people in 158 households. It was the most populous village in its rural district.
