= Aminabad, Firuzkuh =

Village in Tehran province, Iran

Aminabad Persian: امين آباد
- Village
- Location within Iran
- Coordinates: 35°40′55″N 52°33′52″E
- Country: Iran
- Province: Tehran
- County: Firuzkuh
- District: Central
- Rural District: Hablerud
- Elevation: 2,300 m (7,500 ft)

Population (2016)
  - Total: 301
- Time zone: UTC+3:30 (IRST)

Aminabad (Persian: امين آباد) (Note: Also romanized as Amīnābād) is a village in Hablerud Rural District of the Central District in Firuzkuh County, Tehran province, Iran.

== Demographics ==
=== Population ===
At the time of the 2006 National Census, the village's population was 318 in 96 households. The following census in 2011 counted 361 people in 116 households. The 2016 census measured the population of the village as 301 people in 104 households.
