= Dami Aqa =

Dami Aqa دمی آقا
- village
- Location within Iran
- Coordinates: 35°28′22″N 52°26′09″E
- Country: Iran
- Province: Tehran
- County: Firuzkuh
- Bakhsh: Central
- Rural District: Hablerud
- Elevation: 1,350 m (4,430 ft)

Population (2016)
  - Total: 77
- Time zone: UTC+3:30 (IRST)

Dami Aqa (Persian: دمی آقا, also Romanized as Damī Āqā; also known as Dey Āqā) is a village in Hablerud Rural District, in the Central District of Firuzkuh County, Tehran Province, Iran.

At the time of the 2006 National Census, the village's population was 107 in 26 households. The following census in 2011 counted 123 people in 42 households. The 2016 census measured the population of the village as 77 people in 32 households.
