= Sarmandan =

Sarmandan سرمندان
- Village
- Interactive map of Sarmandan
- Coordinates: 35.678°N 52.968°E
- Country: Iran
- Province: Tehran
- County: Firuzkuh
- Bakhsh: Central
- Rural District: Poshtkuh

Population (2016)
  - Total: 0
- Time zone: UTC+3:30 (IRST)

Sarmandan (Persian: سرمندان, also Romanized as Sarmandān) is a small village in Poshtkuh Rural District, in the Central District of Firuzkuh County, Tehran Province, Iran.

At the time of the 2006 National Census, the village's population was 27 in 7 households. The village was unpopulated during the 2011 census. The 2016 census measured o households residing in the village.
