= Jeliz Jand =

Village in Tehran province, Iran

Jeliz Jand Persian: جليزجند
- Village
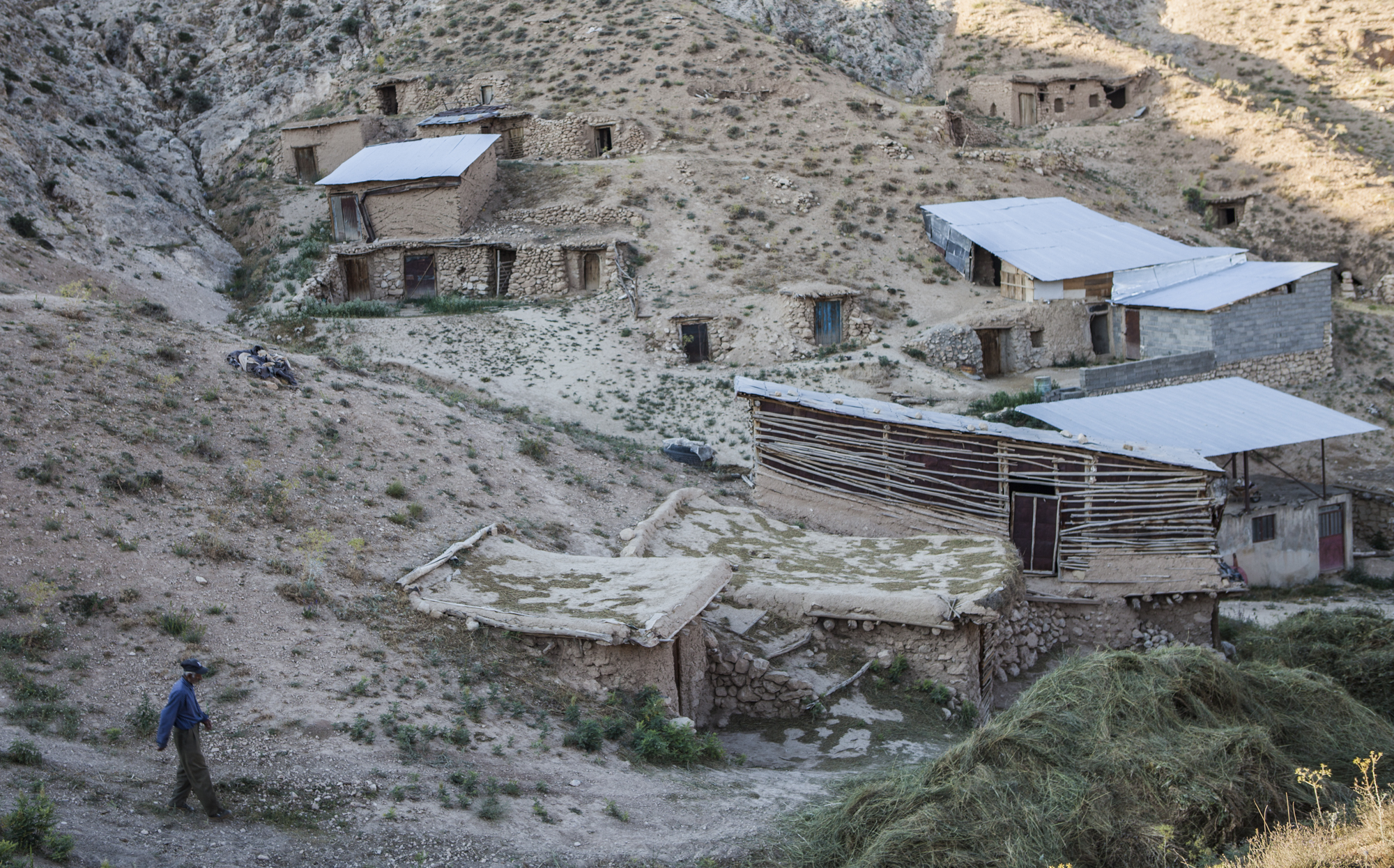

- Location within Iran
- Coordinates: 35°49′54″N 52°44′00″E
- Country: Iran
- Province: Tehran
- County: Firuzkuh
- District: Central
- Rural District: Shahrabad
- Elevation: 2,160 m (7,090 ft)

Population (2016)
  - Total: 574
- Time zone: UTC+3:30 (IRST)

Jeliz Jand (Persian: جليزجند) (Note: Also romanized as Jelīz Jand; also known as Jalaz Jand, Jalezjand, and Jelezjand) is a village in Shahrabad Rural District of the Central District in Firuzkuh County, Tehran province, Iran.

== Demographics ==
=== Population ===
At the time of the 2006 National Census, the village's population was 589 in 181 households. The following census in 2011 counted 339 people in 163 households. The 2016 census measured the population of the village as 574 people in 215 households.
