= Katalan =

Village in Tehran province, Iran

Katalan Persian: كتالان
- Village
- Location within Iran
- Coordinates: 35°50′53″N 52°50′15″E
- Country: Iran
- Province: Tehran
- County: Firuzkuh
- District: Central
- Rural District: Poshtkuh
- Elevation: 2,180 m (7,150 ft)

Population (2016)
  - Total: 274
- Time zone: UTC+3:30 (IRST)

Katalan (Persian: كتالان) (Note: Also romanized as Katālān) is a village in Poshtkuh Rural District of the Central District in Firuzkuh County, Tehran province, Iran.

== Demographics ==
=== Population ===
At the time of the 2006 National Census, the village's population was 364 in 97 households. The following census in 2011 counted 372 people in 142 households. The 2016 census measured the population of the village as 274 people in 98 households.
