= Amiriyeh, Firuzkuh =

Village in Tehran province, Iran

Amiriyeh Persian: اميريه
- Village
- Location within Iran
- Coordinates: 35°46′27″N 52°47′58″E
- Country: Iran
- Province: Tehran
- County: Firuzkuh
- District: Central
- Rural District: Poshtkuh
- Elevation: 1,980 m (6,500 ft)

Population (2016)
  - Total: 365
- Time zone: UTC+3:30 (IRST)

Amiriyeh (Persian: اميريه) (Note: Also romanized as Amīrīyeh) is a village in Poshtkuh Rural District of the Central District in Firuzkuh County, Tehran province, Iran.

== Demographics ==
=== Population ===
At the time of the 2006 National Census, the village's population was 461 in 124 households. The following census in 2011 counted 371 people in 119 households. The 2016 census measured the population of the village as 365 people in 115 households.
