= Aru, Firuzkuh =

Aru آرو
- village
- Location within Iran
- Coordinates: 35°48′34″N 52°59′26″E
- Country: Iran
- Province: Tehran
- County: Firuzkuh
- Bakhsh: Central
- Rural District: Poshtkuh
- Elevation: 2,350 m (7,710 ft)

Population (2011)
  - Total: 13
- Time zone: UTC+3:30 (IRST)

Aru (Persian: آرو, also Romanized as Ārū and Arow) is a village in Poshtkuh Rural District, in the Central District of Firuzkuh County, Tehran Province, Iran.

At the time of the 2006 National Census, the village's population was 77 in 22 households. The following census in 2011 counted 13 people in 4 households. The 2016 census measured less than 4 households.
