= Torud, Tehran =

Village in Tehran province, Iran

Torud Persian: طرود
- Village
- Location within Iran
- Coordinates: 35°47′04″N 52°56′21″E
- Country: Iran
- Province: Tehran
- County: Firuzkuh
- District: Central
- Rural District: Poshtkuh

Population (2016)
  - Total: 458
- Time zone: UTC+3:30 (IRST)

Torud (Persian: طرود) (Note: Also romanized as Ţorūd; also known as Tūrūt) is a village in Poshtkuh Rural District of the Central District in Firuzkuh County, Tehran province, Iran.

== Demographics ==
=== Population ===
At the time of the 2006 National Census, the village's population was 663 in 173 households. The following census in 2011 counted 787 people in 258 households. The 2016 census measured the population of the village as 458 people in 162 households. It was the most populous village in its rural district.
