= Tarom-e Gur Sefid =

Taren طارن
- Village
- Location within Iran
- Coordinates: 35°44′16″N 53°02′29″E
- Country: Iran
- Province: Tehran
- County: Firuzkuh
- Bakhsh: Central
- Rural District: Poshtkuh

Population (2016)
  - Total: 68
- Time zone: UTC+3:30 (IRST)

Tarom-e Gur Sefid (Persian: طارم گورسفيد, also Romanized as Ţārom-e Gūr Sefīd; also known as Ţāren and Ţabībābād) is a village in Poshtkuh Rural District, in the Central District of Firuzkuh County, Tehran Province, Iran

At the time of the 2006 National Census, the village's population was 49 in 10 households. The following census in 2011 counted 24 people in 10 households. The 2016 census measured the population of the village as 68 people in 36 households.
