= Shahrabad, Tehran =

Village in Tehran province, Iran

Shahrabad Persian: شهرآباد
- Village
- Location within Iran
- Coordinates: 35°48′02″N 52°41′12″E
- Country: Iran
- Province: Tehran
- County: Firuzkuh
- District: Central
- Rural District: Shahrabad

Population (2016)
  - Total: 822
- Time zone: UTC+3:30 (IRST)

Shahrabad (Persian: شهرآباد) (Note: Also romanized as Shahrābād; also known as Shahrwa) is a village in, and the capital of, Shahrabad Rural District in the Central District of Firuzkuh County, Tehran Province, Iran.

== Demographics ==
=== Population ===
At the time of the 2006 National Census, the village's population was 488 in 152 households. The following census in 2011 counted 588 people in 198 households. The 2016 census measured the population of the village as 822 people in 266 households. It was the most populous village in its rural district.
