= Nam Avar =

Nam Avar ناماور
- village
- Location within Iran
- Coordinates: 35°48′29″N 52°44′35″E
- Country: Iran
- Province: Tehran
- County: Firuzkuh
- Bakhsh: Central
- Rural District: Shahrabad
- Elevation: 2,080 m (6,820 ft)

Population (2006)
  - Total: 128
- Time zone: UTC+3:30 (IRST)

Nam Avar (Persian: ناماور, also Romanized as Nām Āvar and Nimewar; also known as Āvar) is a village in Shahrabad Rural District, in the Central District of Firuzkuh County, Tehran Province, Iran.

At the time of the 2006 National Census, the village's population was 274 in 76 households. The following census in 2011 counted 129 people in 53 households. The 2016 census measured the population of the village as 128 people in 51 households.
