= Arab Ali =

Arab Li عرب لی
- Village
- Interactive map of Arab Li
- Coordinates: 35.75°N 52.714°E
- Country: Iran
- Province: Tehran
- County: Firuzkuh
- Bakhsh: Central
- Rural District: Shahrabad

Population (2016)
  - Total: 0
- Time zone: UTC+3:30 (IRST)

Arab Li (Persian: عرب لی, also Romanized as ʿArab Lī) was a village in Shahrabad Rural District, in the Central District of Firuzkuh County, Tehran Province, Iran.

At the time of the 2006 National Census, the village's population was 19 in 10 households. The following census in 2011 classified the village as permanently unpopulated. The 2016 census measured a population of 0.
