= Komand =

Kamand كمند
- Village
- Location within Iran
- Coordinates: 35°46′30″N 52°51′30″E
- Country: Iran
- Province: Tehran
- County: Firuzkuh
- Bakhsh: Central
- Rural District: Poshtkuh

Population (2016)
  - Total: 138
- Time zone: UTC+3:30 (IRST)

Kamand (Persian: كمند, also Romanized as Kamand) is a village in Poshtkuh Rural District, in the Central District of Firuzkuh County, Tehran Province, Iran. It's located by Road 36.

At the time of the 2006 National Census, the village's population was 456 in 98 households. The following census in 2011 counted 190 people in 57 households. The 2016 census measured the population of the village as 138 people in 49 households.
