= Tares, Iran =

Village in Tehran province, Iran

Tares Persian: طارس
- Village
- Location within Iran
- Coordinates: 35°47′34″N 52°39′16″E
- Country: Iran
- Province: Tehran
- County: Firuzkuh
- District: Central
- Rural District: Shahrabad
- Elevation: 2,050 m (6,730 ft)

Population (2016)
  - Total: 298
- Time zone: UTC+3:30 (IRST)

Tares (Persian: طارس) (Note: Also romanized as Ţāras and Tāres) is a village in Shahrabad Rural District of the Central District in Firuzkuh County, Tehran province, Iran.

== Demographics ==
=== Population ===
At the time of the 2006 National Census, the village's population was 149 in 60 households. The following census in 2011 counted 569 people in 168 households. The 2016 census measured the population of the village as 298 people in 116 households.
