= Gavadeh =

Gavadeh گاوده
- village
- Location within Iran
- Coordinates: 35°35′48″N 52°44′37″E
- Country: Iran
- Province: Tehran
- County: Firuzkuh
- Bakhsh: Central
- Rural District: Poshtkuh
- Elevation: 2,460 m (8,070 ft)

Population (2016)
  - Total: 158
- Time zone: UTC+3:30 (IRST)

Gavadeh (Persian: گاوده) is a village in Poshtkuh Rural District, in the Central District of Firuzkuh County, Tehran Province, Iran.

At the time of the 2006 National Census, the village's population was 308 in 84 households. The following census in 2011 counted 212 people in 81 households. The 2016 census measured the population of the village as 158 people in 66 households.
