= Geduk =

Geduk گدوك
- village
- Location within Iran
- Coordinates: 35°50′00″N 52°48′00″E
- Country: Iran
- Province: Tehran
- County: Firuzkuh
- Bakhsh: Central
- Rural District: Poshtkuh
- Elevation: 2,225 m (7,300 ft)

Population (2016)
  - Total: 56
- Time zone: UTC+3:30 (IRST)

Geduk (Persian: گدوك, also Romanized as Gedūk) is a village in Poshtkuh Rural District, in the Central District of Firuzkuh County, Tehran Province, Iran.

== Geography ==
Gaduk is on the border between Tehran and Mazandaran provinces, near Road 79. The Trans-Iranian Railway also passes through Gaduk and has a train station south of the village.

Gaduk has a highland climate, with cold and freezing winters, but mild summers. It has the highest altitude and snowfall among all villages on Firuzkuh road. It's also known for its local Doogh and Aush.

== Demographics ==
At the time of the 2006 National Census, the village's population was 133 in 37 households. The following census in 2011 counted 40 people in 17 households. The 2016 census measured the population of the village as 56 people in 25 households.
