= Dahin =

Dahin may refer to:

- Daheen, a popular dessert in Iraq
- Strained yogurt
- Dahin, Iran, a village in Tehran Province, Iran
