= Gur Sefid =

Gur Sefid or Gur-e Sefid (Persian: گورسفيد) may refer to:

- Gur-e Sefid, Fars
- Gur Sefid, Kermanshah
- Gur Sefid, Lorestan
- Gur Sefid, Tehran
