= Kandian =

Kandian كنديان
- Village
- Location within Iran
- Coordinates: 35°42′23″N 52°58′22″E
- Country: Iran
- Province: Tehran
- County: Firuzkuh
- Bakhsh: Central
- Rural District: Poshtkuh

Population (2016)
  - Total: 62
- Time zone: UTC+3:30 (IRST)

Kandian (Persian: كنديان, also Romanized as Kandīān; also known as Kandān) is a village in Poshtkuh Rural District, in the Central District of Firuzkuh County, Tehran Province, Iran.

At the time of the 2006 National Census, the village's population was 52 in 14 households. The following census in 2011 counted 84 people in 28 households. The 2016 census measured the population of the village as 62 people in 23 households.
