= Pirdeh, Tehran =

Village in Tehran province, Iran

Pirdeh Persian: پيرده
- Village
- Location within Iran
- Coordinates: 35°39′46″N 52°47′39″E
- Country: Iran
- Province: Tehran
- County: Firuzkuh
- District: Central
- Rural District: Poshtkuh

Population (2016)
  - Total: 280
- Time zone: UTC+3:30 (IRST)

Pirdeh (Persian: پيرده) (Note: Also romanized as Pīrdeh; also known as Darreh Deh and Fīrdeh) is a village in Poshtkuh Rural District of the Central District in Firuzkuh County, Tehran province, Iran.

== Demographics ==
=== Population ===
At the time of the 2006 National Census, the village's population was 272 in 59 households. The following census in 2011 counted 473 people in 149 households. The 2016 census measured the population of the village as 280 people in 94 households.
