= Ilya rural council =

Ilya rural council (Belarusian: Ільянскі сельсавет; Russian: Ильянский сельсовет) is a lower-level subdivision (selsoviet) of Vileyka district, Minsk region, Belarus. Its administrative center is Ilya, Belarus.
