= Mazdaran =

Village in Tehran province, Iran

Mazdaran Persian: مزداران
- Village
- Location within Iran
- Coordinates: 35°34′52″N 52°36′06″E
- Country: Iran
- Province: Tehran
- County: Firuzkuh
- District: Central
- Rural District: Hablerud
- Elevation: 1,620 m (5,310 ft)

Population (2016)
  - Total: 221
- Time zone: UTC+3:30 (IRST)

Mazdaran (Persian: مزداران) (Note: Also romanized as Mazdārān and Mozdārān; also known as Mazd Dārān, Mazdārūn, and Misdaran) is a village in Hablerud Rural District of the Central District in Firuzkuh County, Tehran province, Iran.

== Demographics ==
=== Population ===
At the time of the 2006 National Census, the village's population was 445 in 156 households. The following census in 2011 counted 311 people in 119 households. The 2016 census measured the population of the village as 221 people in 111 households.
