= Mahn =

Mahn may refer to:

- Carl August Friedrich Mahn, German philologist
- Mahn, Iran, a village in Tehran Province
