= Bad Rud, Tehran =

Village in Tehran province, Iran

Bad Rud Persian: بادرود
- Village
- Location within Iran
- Coordinates: 35°49′58″N 52°41′57″E
- Country: Iran
- Province: Tehran
- County: Firuzkuh
- District: Central
- Rural District: Shahrabad

Population (2016)
  - Total: 209
- Time zone: UTC+3:30 (IRST)

Bad Rud (Persian: بادرود) (Note: Also romanized as Bād Rūd; also known as Vārū) is a village in Shahrabad Rural District of the Central District in Firuzkuh County, Tehran province, Iran.

== Demographics ==
=== Population ===
At the time of the 2006 National Census, the village's population was 248 in 74 households. The following census in 2011 counted 288 people in 101 households. The 2016 census measured the population of the village as 209 people in 80 households.
