= Dar Deh, Tehran =

Village in Tehran province, Iran

Dar Deh Persian: درده
- Village
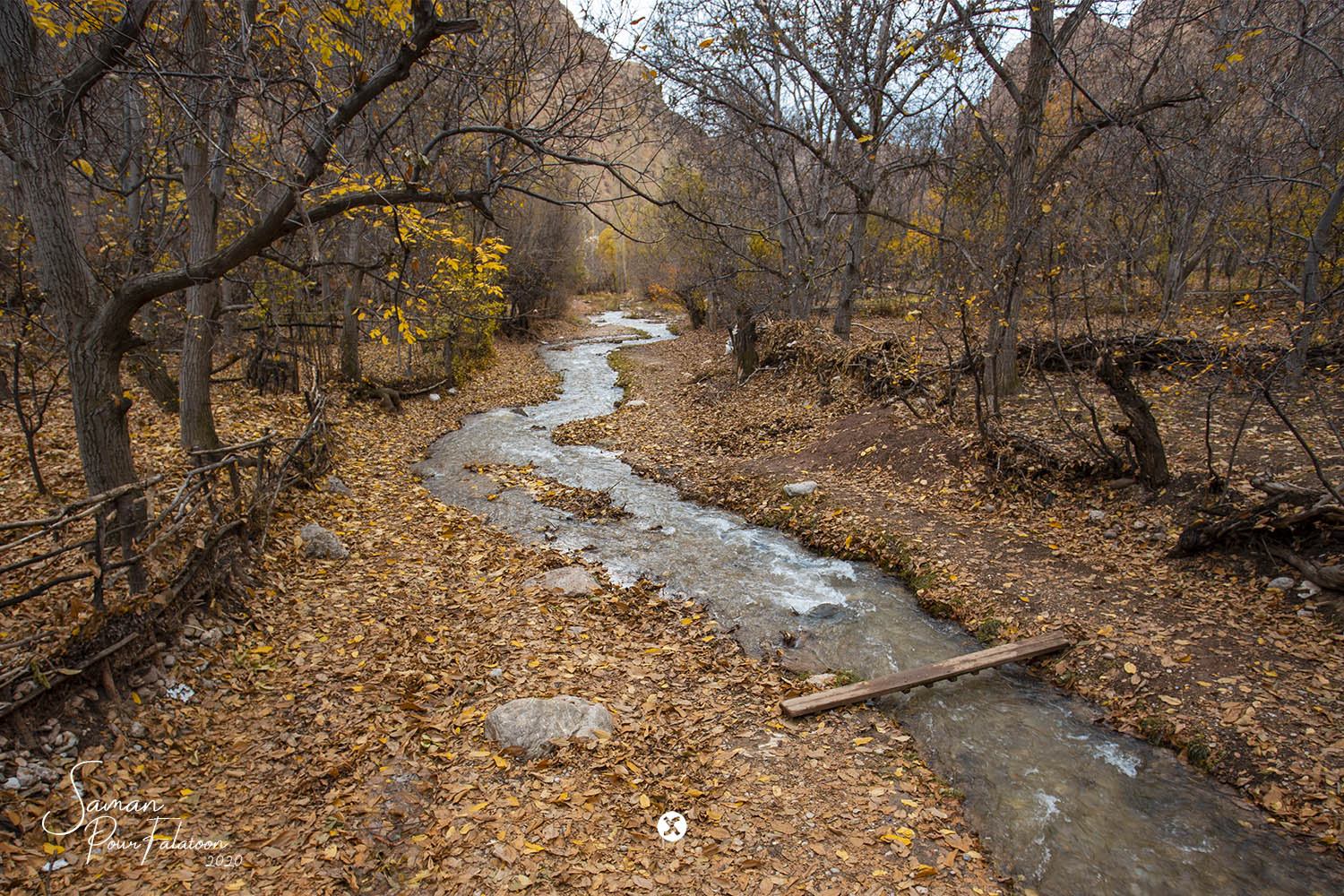
- Darde in Autumn

- Location within Iran
- Coordinates: 35°38′03″N 52°45′32″E
- Country: Iran
- Province: Tehran
- County: Firuzkuh
- District: Central
- Rural District: Poshtkuh
- Elevation: 2,160 m (7,090 ft)

Population (2016)
  - Total: 245
- Time zone: UTC+3:30 (IRST)

Dar Deh (Persian: درده) (Note: Also known as Darreh Deh and Zar Deh) is a village in Poshtkuh Rural District of the Central District in Firuzkuh County, Tehran province, Iran.

== Demographics ==
=== Population ===
At the time of the 2006 National Census, the village's population was 411 in 112 households. The following census in 2011 counted 498 people in 158 households. The 2016 census measured the population of the village as 245 people in 89 households.
