= Marzdaran =

Marzdaran (Persian: مرزداران) may refer to:

- Marzdaran District, Iran
- Marzdaran Rural District, Iran
- Mazdavand, Iran

== See also ==
- Mazdaran
