= Izha rural council =

Izha rural council (Belarusian: Іжскі сельсавет; Russian: Ижский сельсовет) is a lower-level subdivision (selsoviet) of Vileyka district, Minsk region, Belarus. Its administrative center is Izha.
