= Badur =

Badur may refer to:

- Sezer Badur (b. 1984), German footballer
- Badur, Iran, a village in Tehran Province
