= Firuzkuh =

City in Tehran province, Iran

Firuzkuh Persian: فيروزكوه
- City
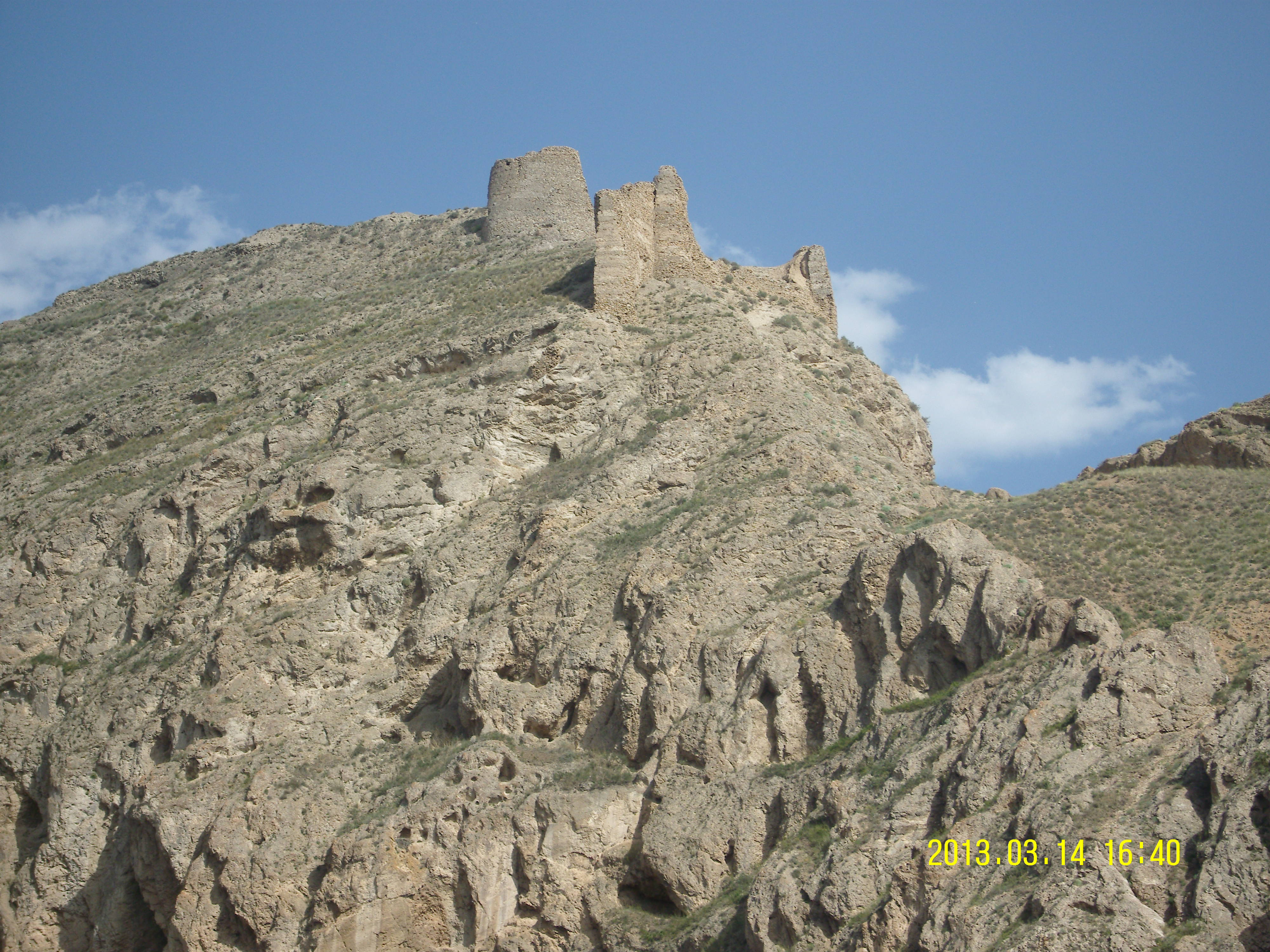
- Firuzkuh Castle

- Location within Iran
- Coordinates: 35°45′25″N 52°46′13″E
- Country: Iran
- Province: Tehran
- County: Firuzkuh
- District: Central

Population (2016)
  - Total: 17,453
- Time zone: UTC+3:30 (IRST)
- Website: Official website

Firuzkuh (Persian: فيروزكوه) (Note: Also romanized as Fīrūz Kūh and Fīrūzkūh; also known as Qaşabeh-ye Fīrūz Kūh; and Tabarian: Pirezkow) is a city in the Central District of Firuzkuh County, Tehran province, Iran, serving as capital of both the county and the district.

== Demographics ==
=== Population ===
At the time of the 2006 National Census, the city's population was 15,807 in 4,334 households. The following census in 2011 counted 20,371 people in 5,484 households. The 2016 census measured the population of the city as 17,453 people in 5,700 households.

== Overview ==
It is northeast of Tehran, in the middle of Alborz Mountains. Previously, it was part of Mazandaran province.

The city has a relatively cool and windy climate. It has some natural attractions and is famous for them, including Tange Vashi, Boornic Cave, Roodafshan Cave, Village Gadook, and the sight-seeing of villages like Varse-Kharan, Zarrin Dasht, Darreh-Deh, and Kaveh Deh.

Firuzkuh is rich in historical heritage and some of the most ancient objects in Tehran Province have been found there. Among its villages, Darreh-Deh contains the most ancient places. During the reign of Timur, Ruy González de Clavijo praised the town's concentric citadel and suggested that it could resist any assault. Nearby castles belonged to the Nizari Ismaili state. Veresk Bridge lies on the road north of Firuzkuh.

== Climate ==
Firuzkuh has a cold semi-arid climate (Köppen BSk).

Climate data for Firuzkuh ( 1993-2010 )
Month	Jan	Feb	Mar	Apr	May	Jun	Jul	Aug	Sep	Oct	Nov	Dec	Year
Record high °C (°F)	14.0 (57.2)	15.4 (59.7)	20.8 (69.4)	26.6 (79.9)	30.0 (86.0)	33.4 (92.1)	35.4 (95.7)	35.6 (96.1)	31.5 (88.7)	26.0 (78.8)	19.4 (66.9)	17.0 (62.6)	35.6 (96.1)
Mean daily maximum °C (°F)	2.5 (36.5)	4.0 (39.2)	9.7 (49.5)	16.3 (61.3)	21.2 (70.2)	26.0 (78.8)	28.4 (83.1)	29.3 (84.7)	25.2 (77.4)	18.8 (65.8)	10.8 (51.4)	5.4 (41.7)	16.5 (61.6)
Daily mean °C (°F)	−4.6 (23.7)	−1.8 (28.8)	3.7 (38.7)	9.1 (48.4)	13.5 (56.3)	17.9 (64.2)	20.8 (69.4)	20.4 (68.7)	16.1 (61.0)	10.7 (51.3)	4.0 (39.2)	−1.1 (30.0)	9.1 (48.3)
Mean daily minimum °C (°F)	−10.6 (12.9)	−9.0 (15.8)	−3.6 (25.5)	1.5 (34.7)	5.0 (41.0)	9.0 (48.2)	12.6 (54.7)	12.0 (53.6)	6.8 (44.2)	1.7 (35.1)	−2.5 (27.5)	−7.0 (19.4)	1.3 (34.4)
Record low °C (°F)	−28.0 (−18.4)	−24.5 (−12.1)	−16.0 (3.2)	−13.0 (8.6)	−2.5 (27.5)	2.0 (35.6)	5.0 (41.0)	3.0 (37.4)	−1.0 (30.2)	−8.8 (16.2)	−21.0 (−5.8)	−26.0 (−14.8)	−28.0 (−18.4)
Average precipitation mm (inches)	37.0 (1.46)	29.4 (1.16)	40.9 (1.61)	36.9 (1.45)	25.7 (1.01)	9.4 (0.37)	18.6 (0.73)	10.4 (0.41)	5.6 (0.22)	14.8 (0.58)	24.8 (0.98)	28.9 (1.14)	282.4 (11.12)
Average rainy days	7.7	7.7	9.4	7.4	8.0	3.2	4.7	4.1	2.4	5.1	5.9	7.4	73
Average snowy days	4.6	5.1	3.4	1.2	0	0	0	0	0	0.1	1.4	4.2	20
Average relative humidity (%)	67	63	56	49	44	42	44	41	43	48	57	64	52
Average dew point °C (°F)	−9.7 (14.5)	−7.9 (17.8)	−5.3 (22.5)	−1.5 (29.3)	1.4 (34.5)	4.6 (40.3)	7.7 (45.9)	6.1 (43.0)	2.9 (37.2)	−0.1 (31.8)	−3.9 (25.0)	−7.1 (19.2)	−1.1 (30.1)
Mean monthly sunshine hours	181.4	194.2	223.3	240.0	300.9	340.5	330.6	325.0	301.7	251.3	196.8	170.7	3,056.4
Source: (Dew Point)
