= Avar, Iran =

Avar (Persian: آور) in Iran may refer to:

- Avar, Qazvin
- Avar, Razavi Khorasan
- Avar, Tehran
