= Mehan =

Mehan مهن
- Village
- Location within Iran
- Coordinates: 35°42′51″N 52°55′43″E
- Country: Iran
- Province: Tehran
- County: Firuzkuh
- Bakhsh: Central
- Rural District: Poshtkuh

Population (2016)
  - Total: 95
- Time zone: UTC+3:30 (IRST)

Mehan (Persian: مهن, also Romanized as Mahn and Mīhan) is a village in Poshtkuh Rural District, in the Central District of Firuzkuh County, Tehran Province, Iran.

At the time of the 2006 National Census, the village's population was 541 in 127 households. The following census in 2011 counted 369 people in 128 households. The 2016 census measured the population of the village as 95 people in 52 households.
