= Dehin =

Village in Tehran province, Iran

Dehin Persian: دهين
- Village
- Location within Iran
- Coordinates: 35°47′23″N 52°41′09″E
- Country: Iran
- Province: Tehran
- County: Firuzkuh
- District: Central
- Rural District: Shahrabad

Population (2016)
  - Total: 303
- Time zone: UTC+3:30 (IRST)

Dehin (Persian: دهين) (Note: Also romanized as Dahīn and Dehīn) is a village in Shahrabad Rural District of the Central District in Firuzkuh County, Tehran province, Iran.

== Demographics ==
=== Population ===
At the time of the 2006 National Census, the village's population was 241 in 63 households. The following census in 2011 counted 484 people in 150 households. The 2016 census measured the population of the village as 303 people in 103 households.
