= Narach, Vileyka district rural council =

Narach rural council (Belarusian: Нарачанскі сельсавет; Russian: Нарочанский сельсовет) is a lower-level subdivision (selsoviet) of Vileyka district, Minsk region, Belarus. Its administrative center is Narach, Vileyka district.
