= Yazni =

Village in Minsk Region, Belarus

Yazni Язні (Belarusian) Язни (Russian)
- Village
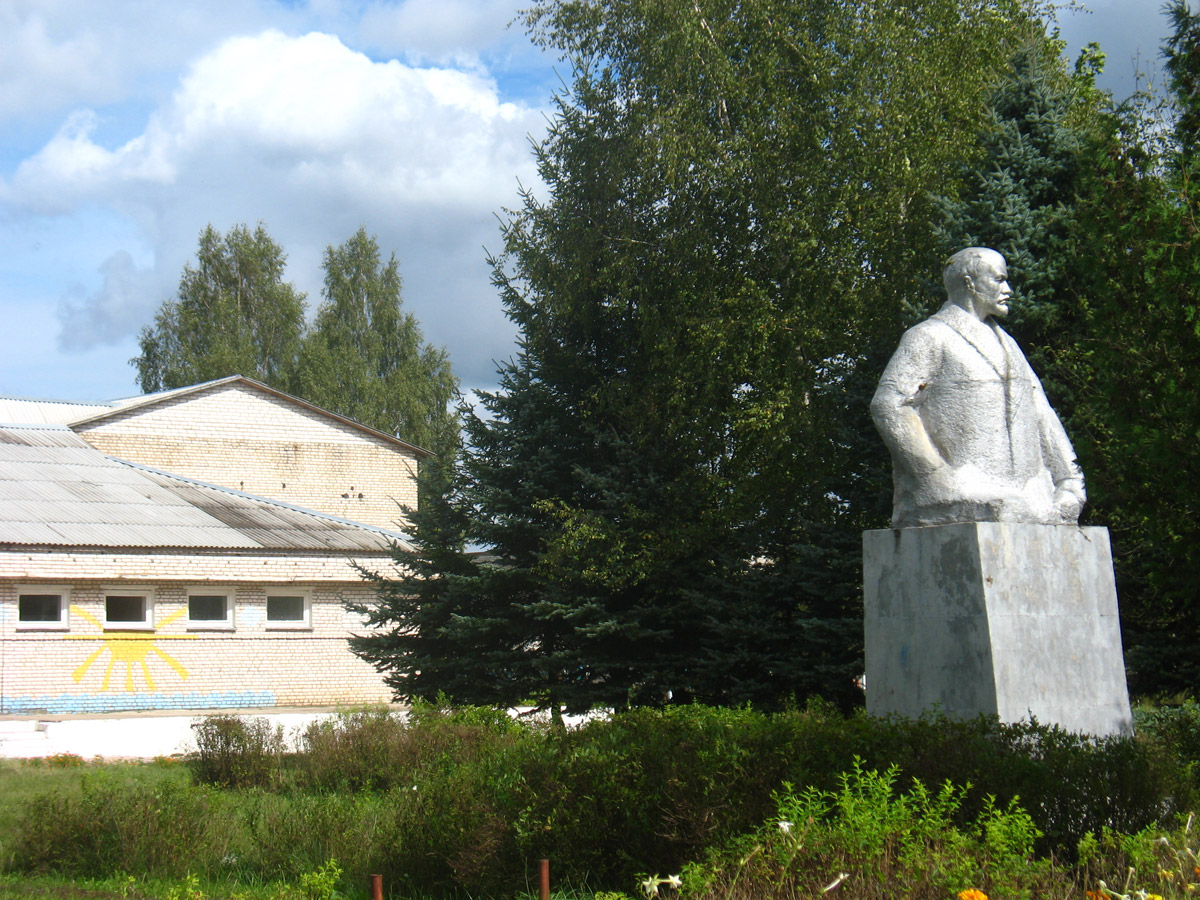

- Location in Belarus
- Coordinates: 54°41′N 27°21′E
- Country: Belarus
- Region: Minsk Region
- District: Vileyka District

Area
  - Total: 53.64 km^{2} (20.71 sq mi)

Population (2019)
  - Total: 284
  - Density: 5.29/km^{2} (13.7/sq mi)
- Time zone: UTC+3 (MSK)

Yazni (Belarusian: Язні, romanized: Jazni; Russian: Язни) is a village in Vileyka District, Minsk Region, Belarus.

== History ==
From 1921 to 1939, Yazni was part of the Republic of Poland, as part of Wilno Voivodeship.

== Demographics ==
=== Population ===
- 1866 — 215.
- 1921 — 374.
- 1931 — 414.
