= Dhami =

Dhami may also refer to:

- Dhami, Nepal, a village
- Dhami,It refers to a surname belonging to the Brahmin and Chhetri communities of the Khas Aryan group, found across various districts of Sudurpashchim and Karnali provinces in Nepal, as well as Himachal Pradesh and Uttarakhand in India.
- Dhami (surname)
- Dhami State, a former princely state located in modern-day Himachal Pradesh

== See also ==
- Dami (disambiguation)
