= Gur Sefid, Tehran =

Village in Tehran province, Iran

Gur Sefid Persian: گورسپید
- Village
- Location within Iran
- Coordinates: 35°43′54″N 53°01′26″E
- Country: Iran
- Province: Tehran
- County: Firuzkuh
- District: Central
- Rural District: Poshtkuh
- Elevation: 2,350 m (7,710 ft)

Population (2016)
  - Total: 210
- Time zone: UTC+3:30 (IRST)

Gur Sefid (Persian: گورسپید) (Note: Also romanized as Gūr Sefīd; also known as Gur Sepid (گورسپید); also romanized as Gūr Sepīd) is a village in Poshtkuh Rural District of the Central District in Firuzkuh County, Tehran province, Iran.

== Demographics ==
=== Population ===
At the time of the 2006 National Census, the village's population was 92 in 22 households. The following census in 2011 counted 214 people in 78 households. The 2016 census measured the population of the village as 210 people in 70 households.
