= Anzeha =

Village in Tehran province, Iran

Anzeha Persian: انزها
- Village
- Location within Iran
- Coordinates: 35°35′40″N 52°37′55″E
- Country: Iran
- Province: Tehran
- County: Firuzkuh
- District: Central
- Rural District: Hablerud
- Elevation: 1,650 m (5,410 ft)

Population (2016)
  - Total: 390
- Time zone: UTC+3:30 (IRST)

Anzeha (Persian: انزها) (Note: Also romanized as Anzehā and Anzhā; also known as Anzeh-ha and Izha) is a village in Hablerud Rural District of the Central District in Firuzkuh County, Tehran province, Iran.

== Demographics ==
=== Language ===
The people of Anzeha speak Mazandarani.

=== Population ===
At the time of the 2006 National Census, the village's population was 592 in 193 households. The following census in 2011 counted 390 people in 180 households. The 2016 census measured the population of the village as 390 people in 190 households.
