= Dar Deh =

Dar Deh or Dardeh (Persian: درده) may refer to:

- Dardeh, Alborz
- Dar Deh, Tehran
