= Ilya, Belarus =

Agrotown in Minsk Region, Belarus

Ilya Ілья (Belarusian)
- Agrotown
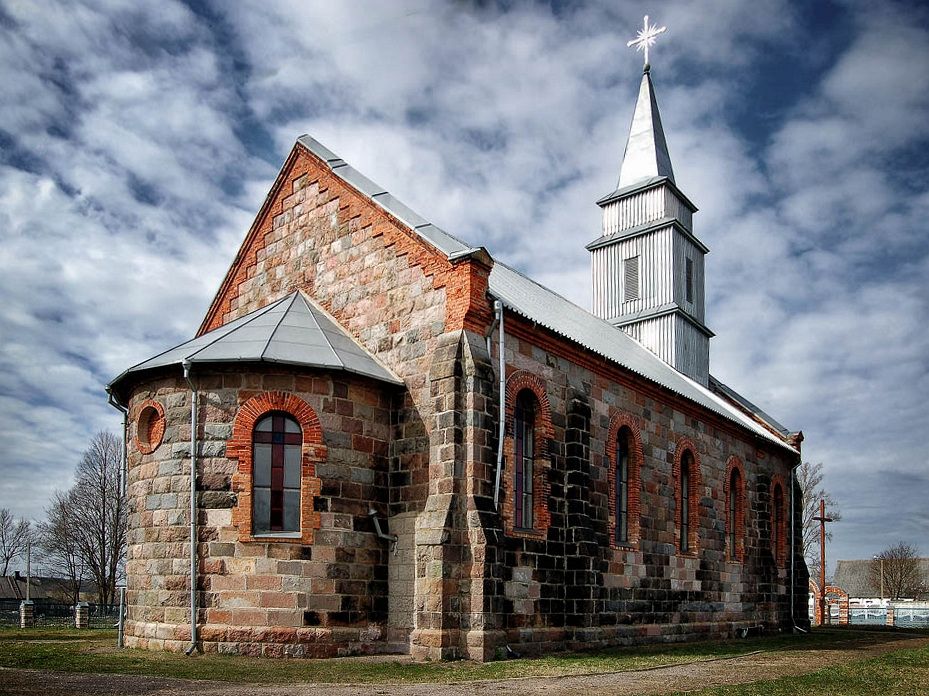
- Church of the Sacred Heart of Jesus in Ilya

- Location within Belarus
- Coordinates: 54°25′03″N 27°17′36″E
- Country: Belarus
- Region: Minsk Region
- District: Vileyka District
- First mentioned: 1473

Population (2010)
  - Total: 1,458
- Time zone: UTC+3 (MSK)

Ilya (Belarusian: Ілья, romanized: Iĺja; Russian: Илья; Polish: Ilia; Lithuanian: Ilija) is an agrotown in Vileyka District, Minsk Region, Belarus. It serves as the administrative center of Ilya selsoviet.

It is first mentioned in historical records dating from the late 15th century. Between the end of World War I and 1939, it was part of Poland. It was a significant Jewish shtetl until 1942, when nearly all of its Jewish citizens were murdered in the town square.

== History ==
The first record of Ilya was in 1473, where it is mentioned as belonging to Bogdan Sakovich, governor of Braslaw for the Grand Duchy of Lithuania. In 1564, Ilya is first mentioned as a town. According to the 1650 inventory, the location included a market square and three streets, 93 yards and 10 public houses. There was also a newly built church, as the previous church burned down shortly before the inventory.

According to the 1882 Geographical Dictionary of the Kingdom of Poland, the town began as a manor of a Radziwiłł prince, and as early as 1634, there was both a Christian church and Jewish synagogue. According to folklore, the prince named his manor and a nearby rivulet "Ilya" after a dream in which the prophet Elijah (Ilya) came to him.

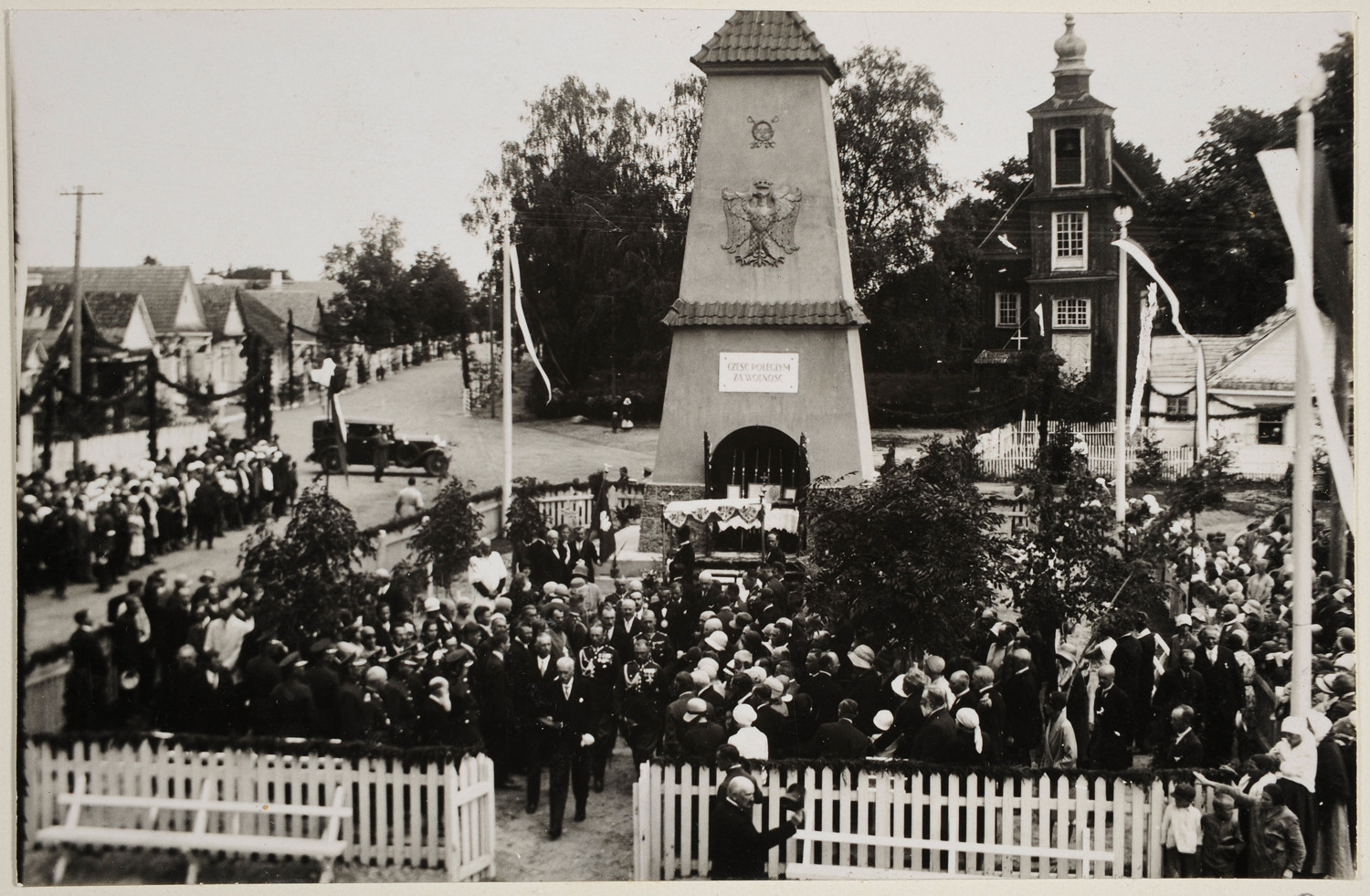
Monument to the participants of the January Uprising, c. 1920

By the 19th century, there was also a yeshiva in Ilya. There is a prominent Catholic church in the village, Church of the Sacred Heart of Jesus, which was designed by August Klein and completed in 1909. It was used as a dairy in the Soviet era, but was restored in 1993.

Citizens of the town participated in the January Uprising, rebelling against the Russian Empire. A monument was erected to honor the participants in the 1920s following the restoration of independent Poland.

According to the 1921 Polish census, the town had a population of 1,457, 36.5% Belarusian, 32.2% Polish and 31.3% Jewish.

=== Holocaust ===
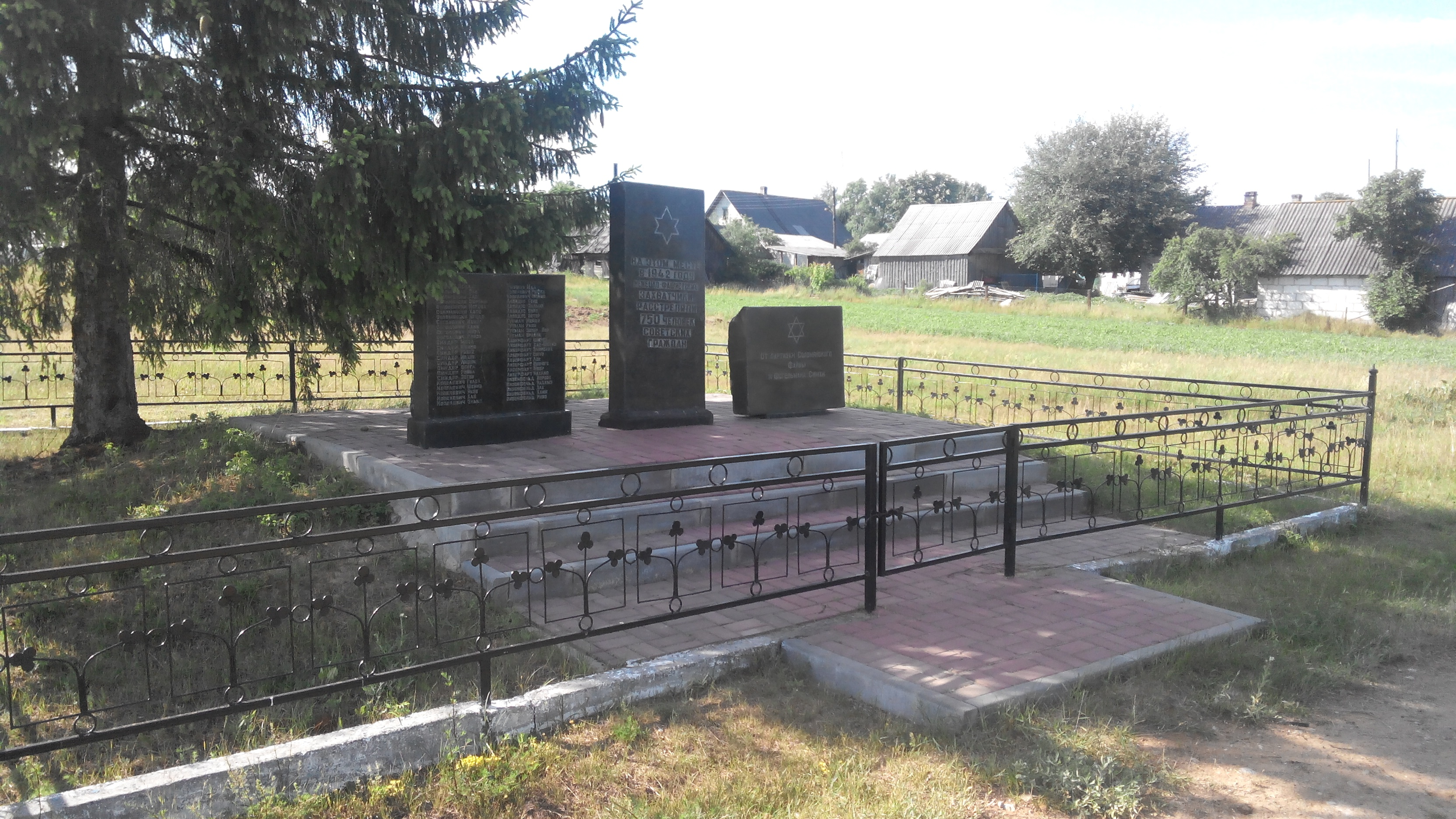
Holocaust memorial

After the Soviet invasion of Poland in World War II, the town was annexed to the Soviet Union. The town fell to the Germans after Operation Barbarossa, and the Jews of Ilya were forced into a ghetto. On 17 March 1942, 750 to 900 Jews were murdered by Nazi soldiers. The village was burned to the ground in 1944, just before the area was recaptured by the Soviets.

This episode of Ilya's history was featured in the American adaptation of the TV series Who Do You Think You Are? in 2010. American actress Lisa Kudrow (best known for her role as Phoebe Buffay on the sitcom Friends) traces her family roots to Ilya, where her paternal grandmother, Gertrude "Grunia" Farbermann, had emigrated from. Her paternal great-grandmother (Grunia's mother), Mera Mordechowicz (Мера Мордехович), however, stayed, and was among the citizens murdered. In the episode, Kudrow goes to the market square, where the Jews of Ilya had been marched to a pit in the middle of the town. There, German soldiers lined them up two or three at a time at the edge of the pit and shot them, resulting in them falling into it. According to a witness statement which she reads from during the programme, oil was then poured over the stricken victims and a fire was ignited. Locals were said to have heard the screams from those who survived shooting dying in the flames for hours afterwards.

In 1962, the Association of Ilya Descendants in Israel published a Yizkor Book, The Book of Ilya, on the history of the shtetl.
