= Lyuban, Vileyka district rural council =

Lyuban rural council (Belarusian: Любанскі сельсавет; Russian: Любанский сельсовет) is a lower-level subdivision (selsoviet) of Vileyka district, Minsk region, Belarus. Its administrative center is Lyuban, Vileyka district.

== Rural localities ==
The populations are from the 2009 Belarusian census and 2019 Belarusian census

Russian name	Belarusian name	Pop. 2009	Pop. 2019
д Бильцевичи	в Більцавічы	131	117
д Будки	в Будкі	15	10
д Бутримово	в Бутрымава	53	44
д Довборово	в Даўбарова	2	-
д Дядичи	в Дзядзічы	41	41
д Желтки	в Жаўткі	56	34
д Жерствянка	в Жарсцвянка	3	-
д Журихи	в Журыхі	272	238
д Заозерье	в Заазер'е	15	7
д Казаны	в Казаны	4	3
д Карвели	в Карвелі	75	81
д Коловичи	в Каловічы	173	157
д Короткие	в Кароткія	2	3
д Красный Берег	в Красны Бераг	-	-
д Кузьмичи	в Кузьмічы	38	19
д Кульшино	в Кульшыно	59	59
д Лески	в Ляскі	1	2
аг Любань	аг Любань	984	1049
д Любовши	в Любоўшы	1	-
д Новики	в Навікі	12	10
д Новые Зимодры	в Новыя Зімодры	7	-
д Островы	в Астравы	1	-
д Порса	в Порса	325	248
д Сивцы	в Сіўцы	29	14
д Снежково	в Снежкава	184	273
д Стебераки	в Сцеберакі	7	2
д Студенки	в Студзёнкі	9	19
д Сухари	в Сухары	9	6
д Талуть	в Талуць	58	42
д Туровщина	в Тураўшчына	56	42
д Цынцевичи	в Цынцавічы	104	84
д Цна	в Цна	4	-
