= Dami (name) =

Dami may refer to the following people

Given name

- Dami Bakare (born 1988), British volleyball player
- Dami Im (born 1988), Korean-Australian singer and songwriter

Surname

- Abdellah Dami (born 1982), Moroccan-Dutch journalist
- Elisabetta Dami (born 1958), Italian children's fiction writer

== See also ==
- Dhami (surname)
