= Kuranets rural council =

Kuranets rural council (Belarusian: Куранецкі сельсавет; Russian: Куренецкий сельсовет) is a lower-level subdivision (selsoviet) of Vileyka district, Minsk region, Belarus. Its administrative center is Kuranets.
