= Janka Filistovič =

Belarusian politician

- Янка Філістовіч
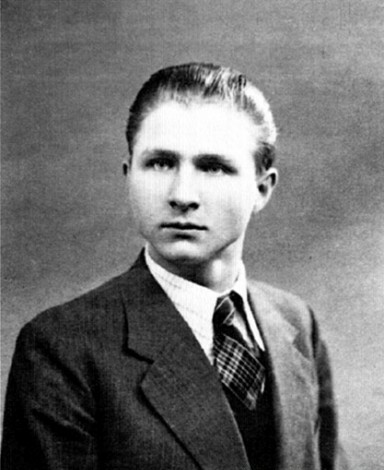
- Born: Іван Андрэевіч Філістовіч; 14 January 1926 the village of Paniacičy, Wilno Voivodeship (nowadays, Vileyka District, Minsk region of Belarus)
- Died: 22 November 1953 (aged 27); Minsk, Byelorussian SSR, Soviet Union
- Cause of death: Execution by shooting
- Resting place: unknown
- Organization: Rada of the Belarusian Democratic Republic
- Known for: Participation in the Belarusian independence movement and the underground anti-Soviet resistance in Belarus in the 1950s

Janka Filistovič (Belarusian: Янка (Іван Андрэевіч) Філістовіч; 14 January 1926 – 22 November 1953) was an active participant in the Belarusian independence movement and a member of the underground anti-Soviet resistance in Belarus in the 1950s.

== Early years ==
Filistovič was born into a large farming family in the village of Paniacičy, Wilejka county, Wilno Voivodeship of the Second Polish Republic (nowadays, Viliejka district, Minsk region of Belarus). After the Soviet invasion of Poland his father was arrested by the Soviet authorities as a kulak and incarcerated in a local prison until the beginning of the German-Soviet War.

To avoid deportation to Germany as an Ostarbeiter, Filistovič joined the Belarusian Auxiliary Police in 1943 but was not involved in any wartime atrocities.

== Life in exile ==
After the war, Filistovič moved to France. He studied history at the Sorbonne (France) and Leuven (Belgium) universities, published the magazine " Maladość” (“Youth") and was one of the leaders of a Belarusian youth organisation in France. In 1951 he became a member of the Rada of the Belarusian Democratic Republic.

In March 1951 he volunteered for a covert operation with the Western intelligence to be dropped off inside Soviet Belarus to establish a contact with the local anti-Soviet partisans and expand the local anti-Soviet resistance.

== Covert operation inside Soviet Belarus ==
After three months of training at the Kaufberen base near Munich, Filistovič was parachuted by the US airforce in the Viliejka district on in September 1951.

On the ground he created a small partisan unit and sought to expand its ranks through anti-Soviet propaganda. However, on 5 September of the following year Filistovič‘s unit was attacked by the Soviet security forces and on 9 September he was captured.

Filistovič‘s trial began on 17 October 1953 during which he passionately defended his mission and a vision of an independent non-Soviet Belarus:

"The Belarusian people, having such a glorious past, have full rights to exist, and soon the Belarusians themselves will show it to the world."
"Our ... goal is to defend the pure, passionate, feelings of love for the Fatherland inherent in the Belarusian youth. We aimed to preserve in the hearts of our youth valuable... elements, helping them to find strength, harden and dedicate themselves to their homeland. [R]etaining faith in the future, we must boldly look forward, knowing that the truth will prevail."

== Death and memory ==
Filistovič was sentenced to death and executed on 22 November 1953. The place of his burial is not known.

While excluded from history books in Lukashenka’s Belarus, he is commemorated by the Belarusian diaspora as a hero who “return[ed] ... to Belarus from the West in order to fight for Belarus’ independence”.
