= Lyudvinova rural council =

Lyudvinova rural council (Belarusian: Людвіноўскі сельсавет; Russian: Людвиновский сельсовет) is a lower-level subdivision (selsoviet) of Vileyka district, Minsk region, Belarus. Its administrative center is Lyudvinova, Vileyka district.
