= Asipavichy, Vileyka district rural council =

Subdivision of Minsk region, Belarus

Asipavichy rural council (Belarusian: Асіпавіцкі сельсавет; Russian: Осиповичский сельсовет) is a lower-level subdivision (selsoviet) of Vileyka district, Minsk region, Belarus. Its administrative center is Asipavichy, Vileyka district.
