= Atashan, Tehran =

Village in Tehran province, Iran

Atashan Persian: آتشان
- Village
- Location within Iran
- Coordinates: 35°34′44″N 52°36′34″E
- Country: Iran
- Province: Tehran
- County: Firuzkuh
- District: Central
- Rural District: Hablerud

Population (2016)
  - Total: 353
- Time zone: UTC+3:30 (IRST)

Atashan (Persian: آتشان) (Note: Also romanized as Ātashān and Āteshān; also known as Ateshun) is a village in, and the capital of, Hablerud Rural District in the Central District of Firuzkuh County, Tehran province, Iran.

== Demographics ==
=== Population ===
At the time of the 2006 National Census, the village's population was 748 in 238 households. The following census in 2011 counted 599 people in 272 households. The 2016 census measured the population of the village as 353 people in 223 households.
