= Vyazyn rural council =

Vyazyn rural council (Belarusian: Вязынскі сельсавет; Russian: Вязынский сельсовет) is a lower-level subdivision (selsoviet) of Vileyka district, Minsk region, Belarus. Its administrative center is Vyazyn.
