= Dawhinava, Vileyka district rural council =

Dawhinava rural council (Belarusian: Даўгінаўскі сельсавет; Russian: Долгиновский сельсовет) is a lower-level subdivision (selsoviet) of Vileyka district, Minsk region, Belarus. Its administrative center is Dawhinava.
