= Poshtkuh Rural District (Firuzkuh County) =

Rural district in Tehran province, Iran

Poshtkuh Rural District Persian: دهستان پشتكوه
- Rural District
- Location within Iran
- Coordinates: 35°43′N 52°55′E
- Country: Iran
- Province: Tehran
- County: Firuzkuh
- District: Central
- Established: 1987
- Capital: Saranza

Population (2016)
  - Total: 2,745
- Time zone: UTC+3:30 (IRST)

Poshtkuh Rural District (Persian: دهستان پشتكوه) is in the Central District of Firuzkuh County, Tehran province, Iran. Its capital is the village of Saranza.

== Demographics ==
=== Population ===
At the time of the 2006 National Census, the rural district's population was 4,560 in 1,174 households. There were 4,267 inhabitants in 1,432 households at the following census of 2011. The 2016 census measured the population of the rural district as 2,745 in 1,007 households. The most populous of its 31 villages was Torud, with 458 people.

=== Other villages in the rural district ===
- Amiriyeh
- Aru
- Dar Deh
- Gavadeh
- Geduk
- Gur Sefid
- Kabudband
- Kadudeh
- Kalar Khan-e Bala
- Kandian
- Kar Gavaneh
- Katalan
- Komand
- Marg Sar
- Mehan
- Navas
- Pirdeh
- Sar Chaman
- Sarmandan
- Saowye Bozorg
- Saow-ye Kuchak
- Sheykh Ali Khan
- Sheykh Veza
- Tarom-e Gur Sefid
- Vey
