= Kryvoye Syalo rural council =

Kryvoye Syalo rural council (Belarusian: Крывасельскі сельсавет; Russian: Кривосельский сельсовет) is a lower-level subdivision (selsoviet) of Vileyka district, Minsk region, Belarus. Its administrative center is Kryvoye Syalo, Vileyka district.
