= Hatsenchytsy rural council =

Hatsenchytsy rural council (Belarusian: Хаценчыцкі сельсавет; Russian: Хотенчицкий сельсовет) is a lower-level subdivision (selsoviet) of Vileyka district, Minsk region, Belarus. Its administrative center is Hatsenchytsy.
