= Firuzkuh Castle =

Castle in Tehran Province, Iran

Firuzkuh castle
- قلعه فیروزکوه
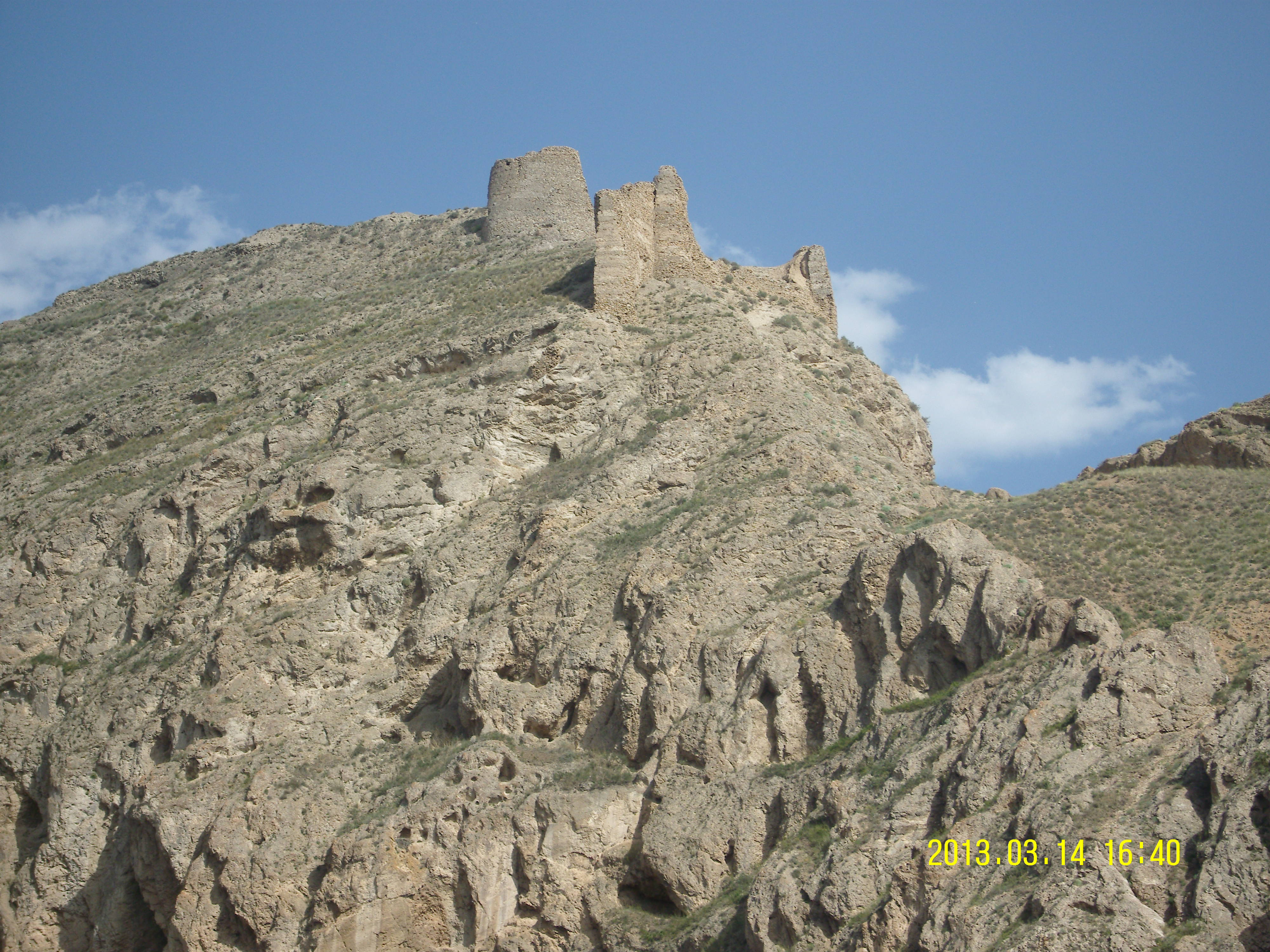
- Interactive map of the Firuzkuh castle area

General information
- Type: Castle
- Location: Firuzkuh County, Iran

Firuzkuh castle (Persian: قلعه فیروزکوه) is a historic castle located in Firuzkuh County in Tehran province. The fortress dates back to the 6th and 7th centuries AH.
