= Dami Mission =

South Korean new religious movement

The Dami Mission (Korean: 다미선교회) was a Christian religious movement founded in South Korea by Lee Jang Rim (Korean: 이장림; Hanja: 李長林). The group received worldwide attention after Lee predicted that the rapture and end of the world would occur on 28 October 1992. After the prediction failed, Lee was convicted of defrauding his estimated 20,000 followers out of millions of dollars and sentenced to prison.

== History ==
At the height of the movement before the date of the prediction, Dami Mission was estimated to have over 300 churches and 20,000 followers. The majority were in South Korea, but there were also branches in Los Angeles and New York.

== Prediction ==
Lee proclaimed that 144,000 believers would ascend into heaven on 28 October 1992, and those left on Earth would face "seven years of war, famine and other scourges" that would kill all life on the planet and bring about the Second Coming of Jesus Christ. The prediction was reportedly based on a 16-year-old boy's vision.

Lee wrote a book titled Getting Close to the End which outlined his prediction and the Dami Mission advertised in both the Los Angeles Times and The New York Times.

=== Initial reactions ===
It was estimated up to 20,000 Koreans believed they would be taken into heaven at midnight on 28 October, causing a "social crisis" in Korea. A woman who had been trying to conceive for three years aborted the seven-month-old fetus, believing she should not be pregnant during the end times. At least four followers suicided in anticipation.

Chang-Young Mun, a 36-year-old man, died of malnutrition on September 8 after fasting for more than 40 days at a Dami Mission church in Los Angeles. He was one of 200 people taking part in the fast, and his death prompted calls for the Dami Mission church to be closed down. The civil authorities described it as a "dangerous cult" and other churches denounced it as "blasphemy".

Police initially refused to investigate the church, citing freedom of religion. However, due to "social pressure", the church was investigated and Lee Jang Rim was arrested in September 1992 for fraud and illegal possession of $26,711 in American currency. Twenty-nine other people were charged with illegally passing out propaganda. Authorities put certain churches and evangelists under constant surveillance.

The South Korean military reported an increase in applications for early discharge and desertions and announced that all material brought onto the barracks would be screened.

Analysts tried to explain why so many well educated people could believe such a prediction. Han Wan Sang, a professor of social policy at Seoul National University, said it reflected a deep despair among Koreans who are "troubled by a lack of progress in improving ties with North Korea and uncertainty over the domestic political situation."

=== October 28, 1992 ===
On October 28, 54 followers who were dressed in white clothing burned furniture outside the Dami Mission office in Wonju. Twenty followers in Busan left $22,000 to those who were expected to stay on earth following the rapture.

Even though their leader was in prison, 1,000 pilgrims still turned up to a Dami Mission church in Seoul on October 28. Police took measures to prevent mass suicides, including barricading windows and stairs to the roof. As midnight approached, 1500 riot police, 200 detectives, 100 journalists, plus emergency vehicles stood outside; plainclothes detectives were stationed inside. Ten minutes after midnight a boy shouted from a window: "Nothing's happening!"

No riots or further suicides were reported.

== Demise ==
Lee officially disbanded the Dami Mission in November 1992, and apologised whilst he was in prison awaiting sentencing. On 4 December 1992, he was convicted of fraud and sentenced to two years in prison because he had collected $4.4 million from his followers to purchase bonds that did not mature until after October 28.

In 2011, Lee, along with Dorothy Martin, Pat Robertson, Elizabeth Clare Prophet, Credonia Mwerinde, and Harold Camping, who have also made predictions about the end of the world, were jointly awarded the satirical Ig Nobel Prize for "teaching the world to be careful when making mathematical assumptions and calculations."
