= Ateshun-e Namju =

Ateshun-e Namju اتشون نامجو
- Village
- Country: Iran
- Province: Kerman
- County: Anbarabad
- Bakhsh: Esmaili
- Rural District: Ganjabad

Population (2006)
  - Total: 26
- Time zone: UTC+3:30 (IRST)
  - Summer (DST): UTC+4:30 (IRDT)

Ateshun-e Namju (Persian: اتشون نامجو, also Romanized as Āteshūn-e Nāmjū) is a village in Ganjabad Rural District, Esmaili District, Anbarabad County, Kerman Province, Iran. At the 2006 census, its population was 26, in 5 families.
