= Dhami (surname) =

Dhami is a Rajput surname predominantly found in the state of Uttarakhand, India. It is associated with a group of Rajput communities who have a rich history of valor, land ownership, and military service. The Dhami surname is often linked to individuals hailing from the Kumaon and Garhwal regions of Uttarakhand. Historically, Rajputs with the Dhami surname are considered to be part of the warrior class and were known for their contributions to local governance and protection of their territories. The Dhami community has also been involved in agriculture, with many families having a strong presence in rural areas of Uttarakhand. Over time, members of the Dhami community have continued to uphold their cultural traditions, contributing to the social and cultural fabric of the region.

== Notable people ==
- inder Dhami (born 1958), British children's author
- Hartinder Dhami, British-Indian Bhangra artist
- Jaz Dhami, Punjabi singer
- Prem Singh Dhami, Nepalese politician and minister
- Pushkar Singh Dhami, Indian politician and the current Chief Minister of Uttarakhand
- Harish Singh Dhami, Indian politician from Uttarakhand
- Drashti Dhami, Indian TV actress

== See also ==
- Dhami (disambiguation)
