= Ali Arab, Khuzestan =

Ali Arab علي عرب
- Village
- Location within Iran
- Coordinates: 32°28′32″N 48°55′39″E
- Country: Iran
- Province: Khuzestan
- County: Dezful
- Bakhsh: Sardasht
- Rural District: Sardasht

Population (2006)
  - Total: 27
- Time zone: UTC+3:30 (IRST)
  - Summer (DST): UTC+4:30 (IRDT)

Ali Arab (Persian: علي عرب, also Romanized as ‘Alī ‘Arab) is a village in Sardasht Rural District, Sardasht District, Dezful County, Khuzestan Province, Iran. At the 2006 census, its population was 27, in 5 families.
