= Gur-e Espid =

Gur-e Espid گوراسپيد
- Village
- Location within Iran
- Coordinates: 30°08′57″N 51°19′51″E
- Country: Iran
- Province: Fars
- County: Mamasani
- Bakhsh: Mahvarmilani
- Rural District: Mahur

Population (2006)
  - Total: 218
- Time zone: UTC+3:30 (IRST)
  - Summer (DST): UTC+4:30 (IRDT)

Gur-e Espid (Persian: گوراسپيد, also Romanized as Gūr-e Espīd and Gūr Espīd; also known as Gūr-e Sefīd) is a village in Mahur Rural District, Mahvarmilani District, Mamasani County, Fars province, Iran. At the 2006 census, its population was 218, in 41 families.
