= Dhami, Nepal =

Ghami Village development committee in Dhawalagiri Zone, Nepal

Ghami, Nepal घमी
- Village development committee
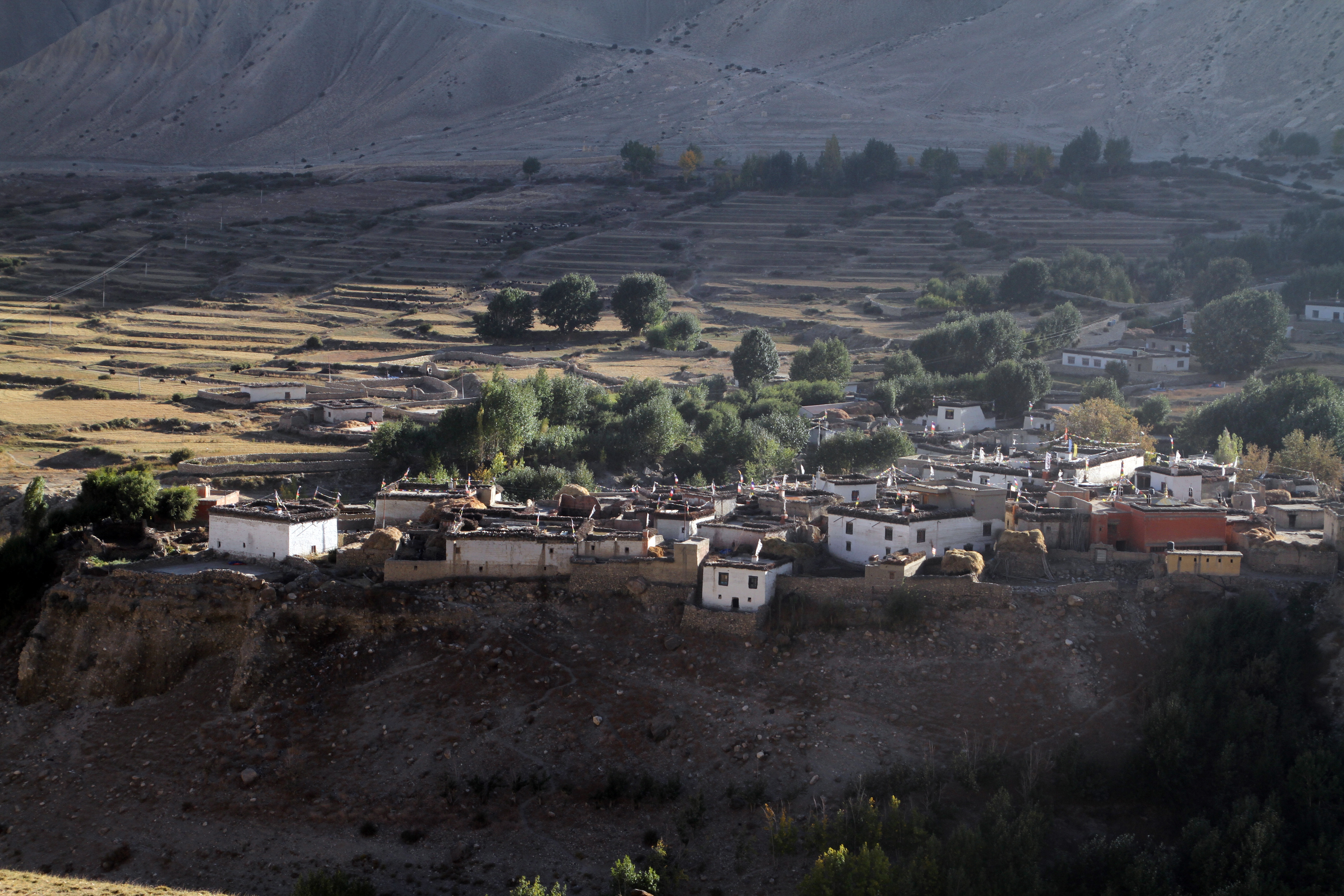

- Location in Nepal Ghami, Nepal (Nepal)
- Coordinates: 29.04°N 83.77°E
- Country: Nepal
- Zone: Dhawalagiri Zone
- District: Mustang District
- Elevation: 3,510 m (11,520 ft)

Population (1991)
  - Total: 850
- Time zone: UTC+5:45 (Nepal Time)

Ghami, Nepal is a village development committee in Mustang District in the Dhawalagiri Zone of northern Nepal. At the time of the 1991 Nepal census it had a population of 850 people living in 158 individual households.

Ghami

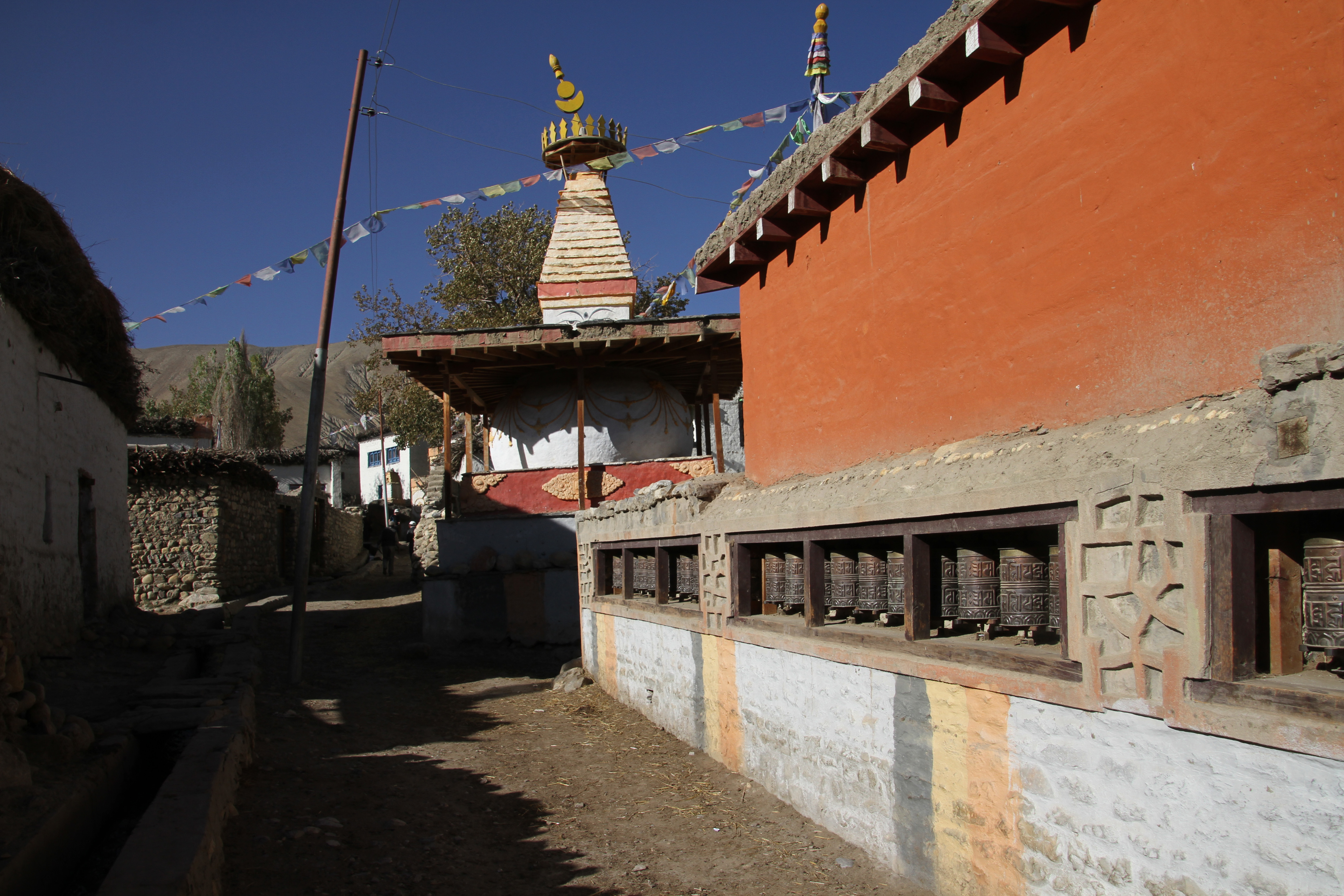

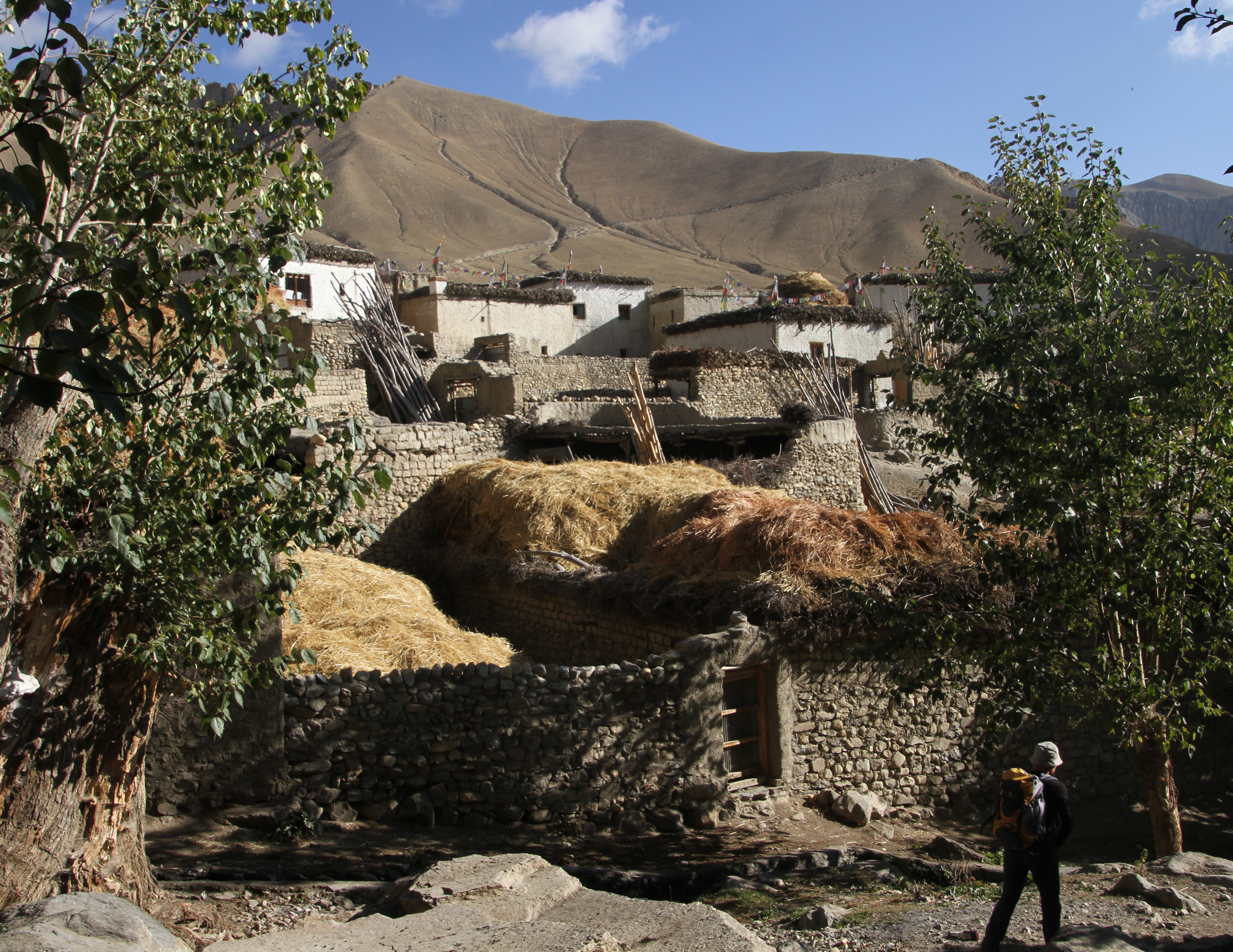

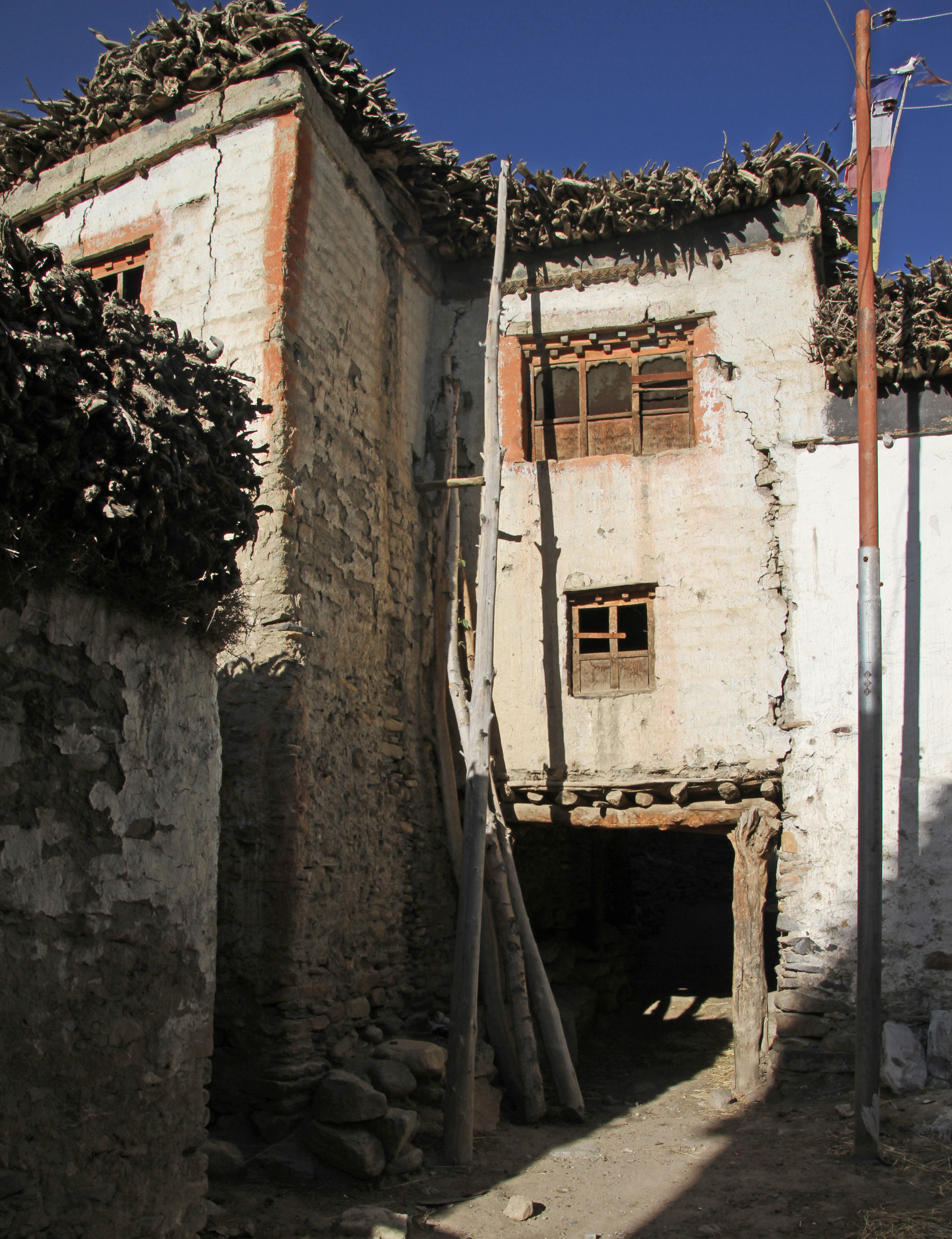

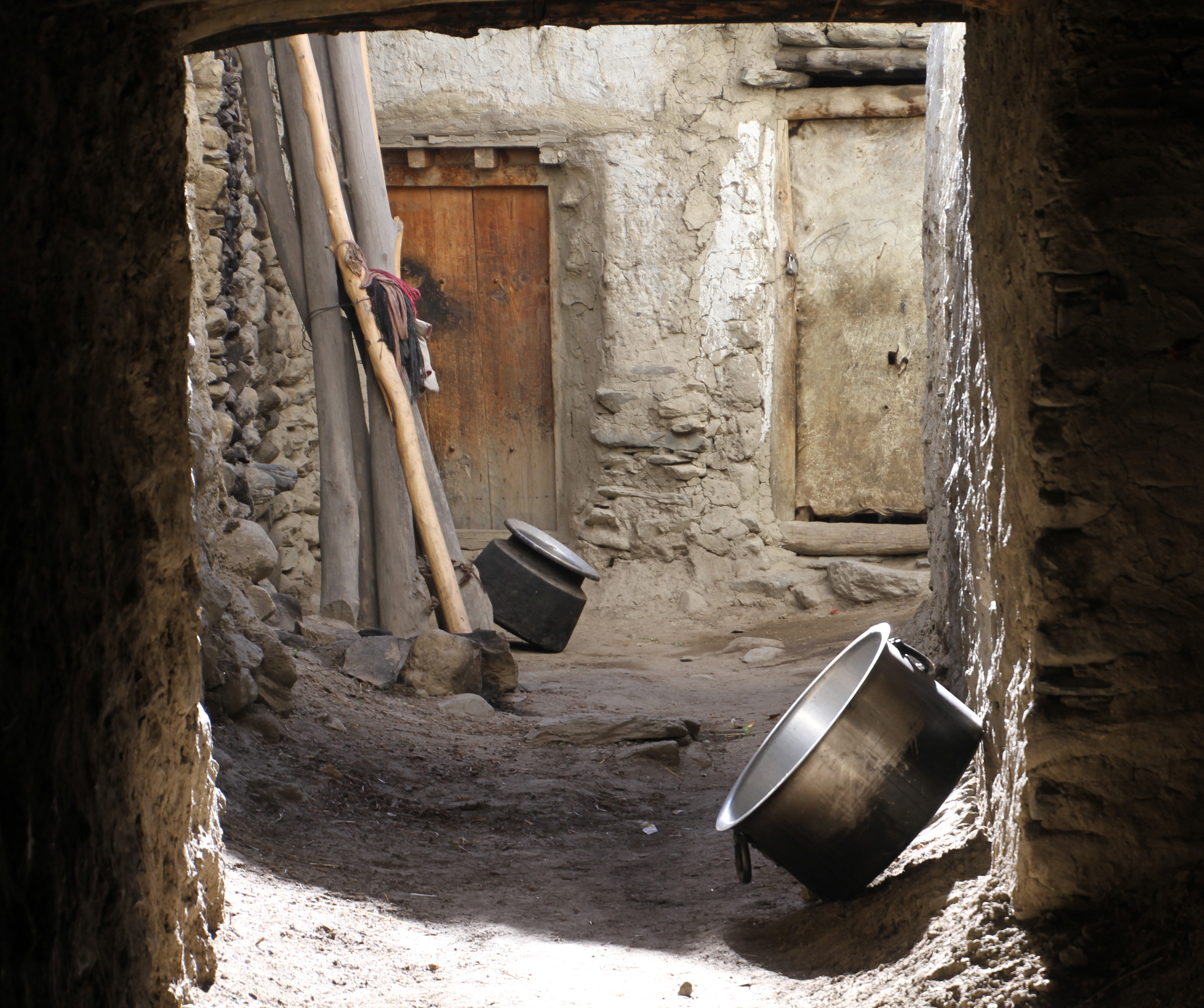

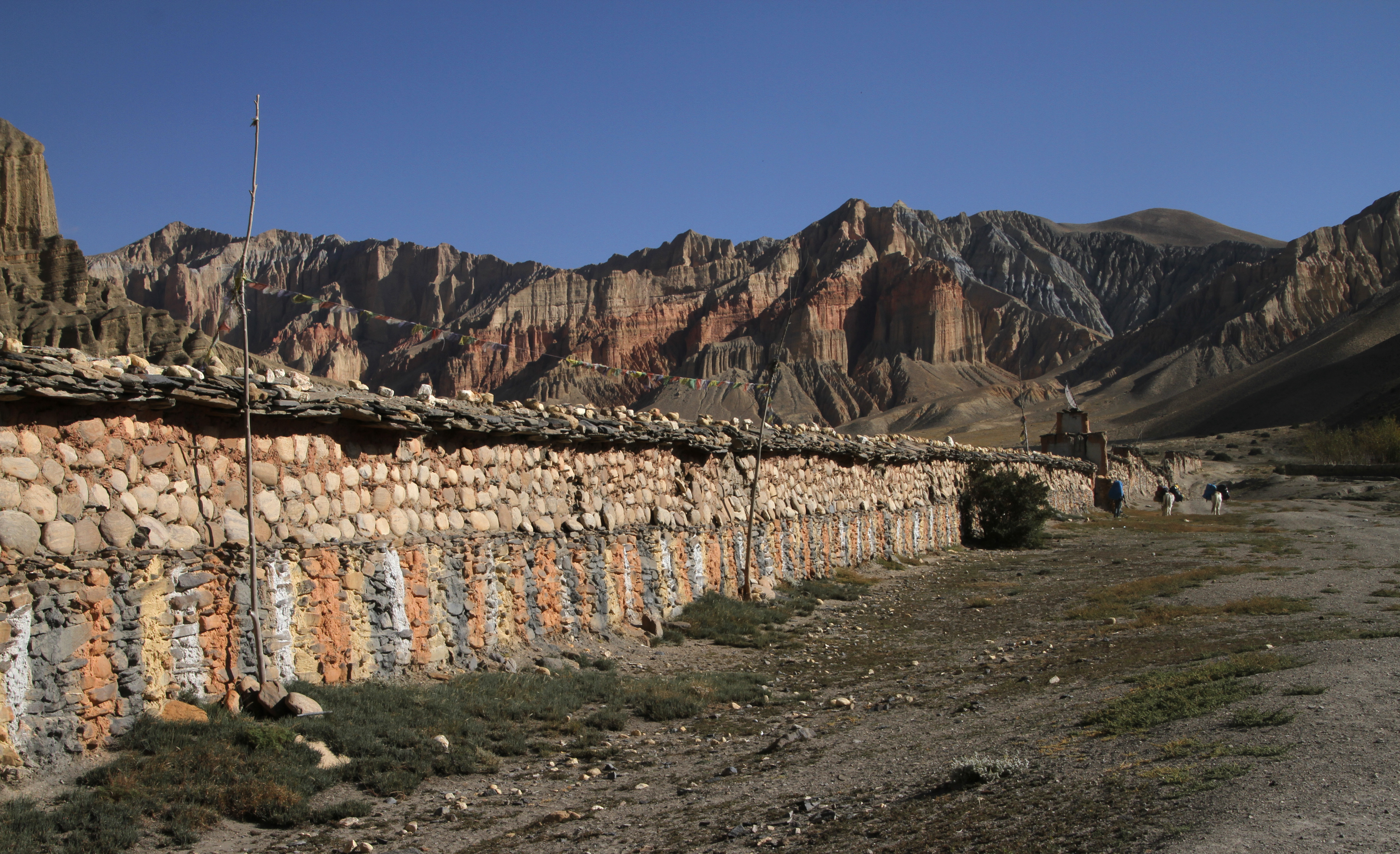

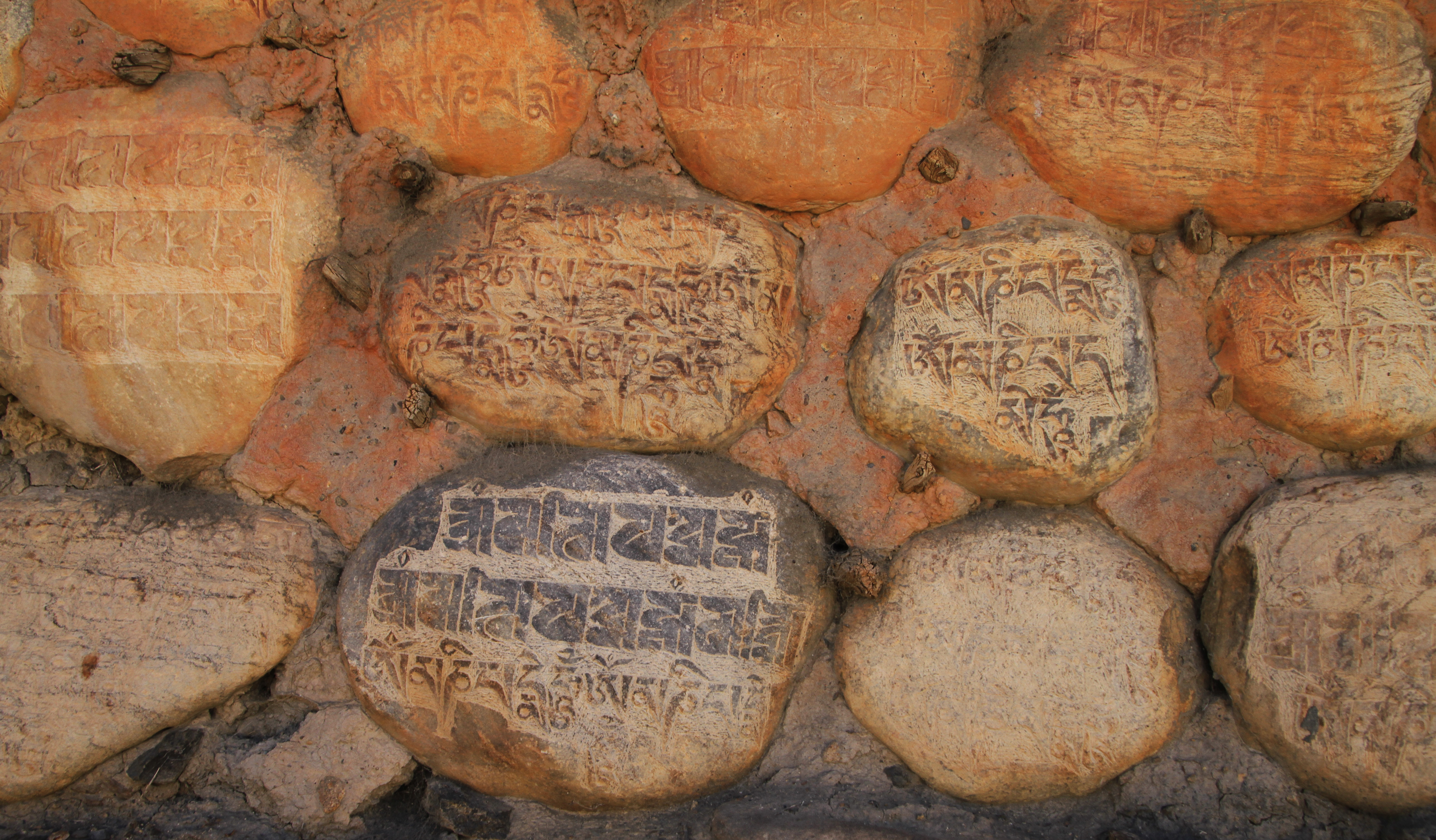

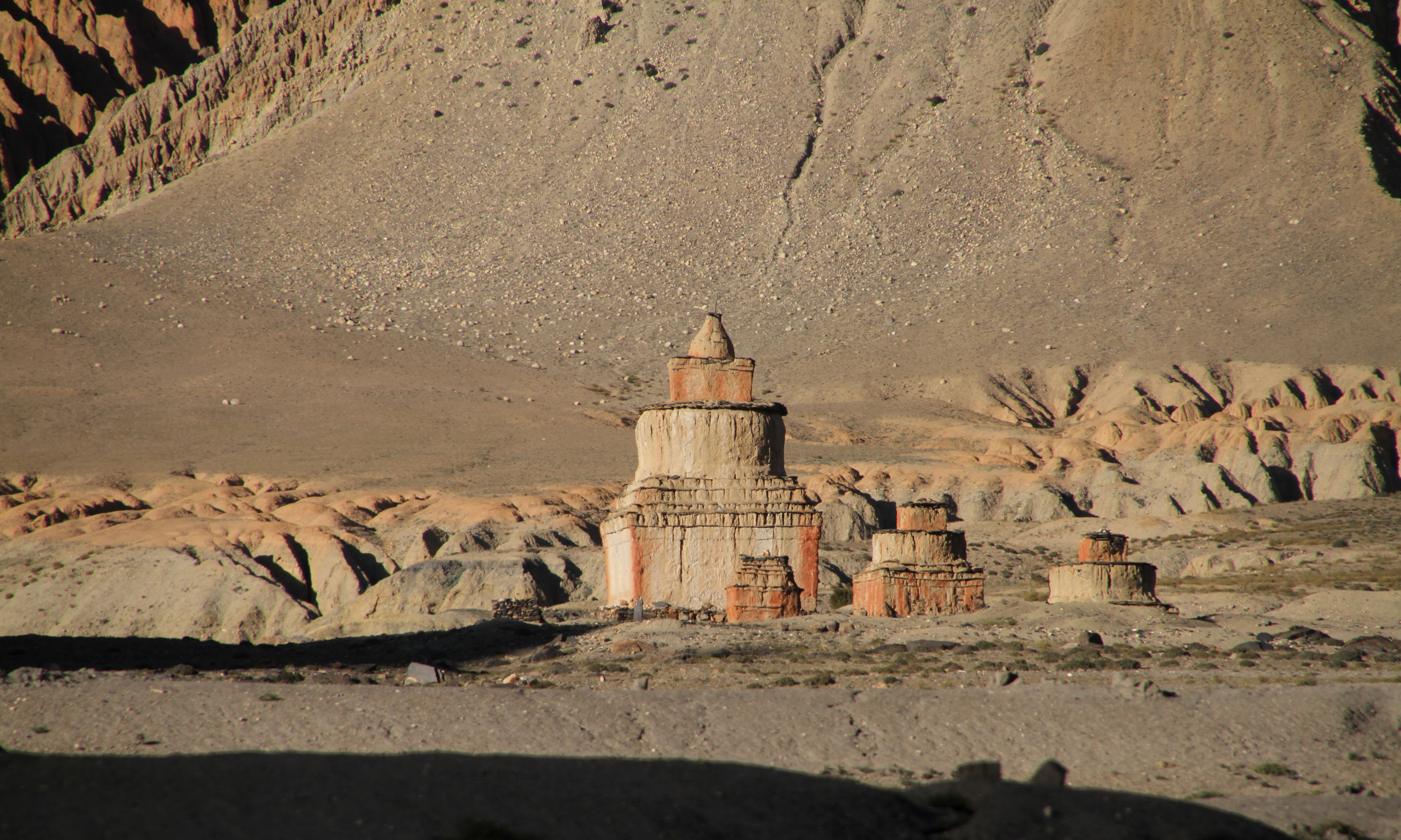
