= Hablerud Rural District =

Rural district in Tehran province, Iran

Hablerud Rural District Persian: دهستان حبلرود
- Rural District
- Location within Iran
- Coordinates: 35°32′N 52°31′E
- Country: Iran
- Province: Tehran
- County: Firuzkuh
- District: Central
- Established: 1987
- Capital: Atashan

Population (2016)
  - Total: 2,883
- Time zone: UTC+3:30 (IRST)

Hablerud Rural District (Persian: دهستان حبلرود) (Note: Also known as Hablehrud Rural District (دهستان حبله‌رود)) is in the Central District of Firuzkuh County, Tehran province, Iran. Its capital is the village of Atashan.

== Demographics ==
=== Population ===
At the time of the 2006 National Census, the rural district's population was 4,884 in 1,518 households. There were 3,983 inhabitants in 1,537 households at the following census of 2011. The 2016 census measured the population of the rural district as 2,883 in 1,263 households. The most populous of its 18 villages was Hesar Bon, with 439 people.

=== Other villages in the rural district ===
- Aminabad
- Anzeha
- Mazdaran
- Simindasht
