= Daheen =

Iraqi dessert

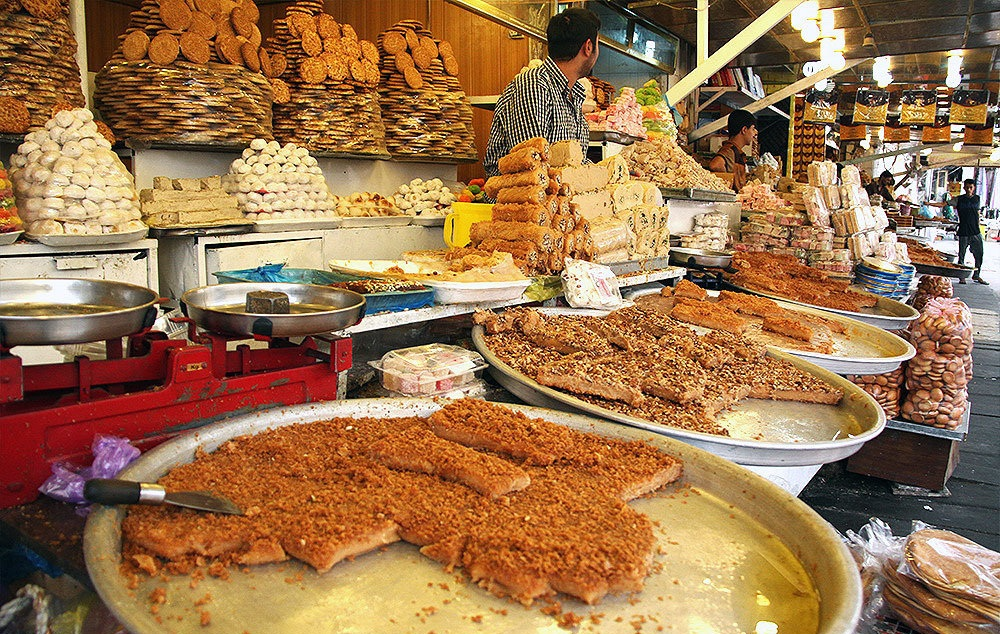
- Type: Dessert
- Place of origin: Iraq
- Region or state: Najaf
- Main ingredients: Flour, sugar, milk, olive oil (or any other oil), coconut, syrup

Daheen (Arabic: دهين) is a popular dessert in Iraq. It is famous in the city of Najaf as this city is considered as its origin. Daheen literally means "oily" in Arabic.

== See also ==
- Churro
- Jalebi
- Lokma
