= Ateshun-e Olya =

Ateshun-e Olya اتشون عليا
- Village
- Location within Iran
- Coordinates: 28°18′40″N 57°43′55″E
- Country: Iran
- Province: Kerman
- County: Anbarabad
- Bakhsh: Esmaili
- Rural District: Ganjabad

Population (2006)
  - Total: 63
- Time zone: UTC+3:30 (IRST)
  - Summer (DST): UTC+4:30 (IRDT)

Ateshun-e Olya (Persian: اتشون عليا, also Romanized as Āteshūn-e ‘Olyā; also known as Ātashān, Āteshān, and Āteshūn) is a village in Ganjabad Rural District, Esmaili District, Anbarabad County, Kerman Province, Iran. At the 2006 census, its population was 63, in 12 families.
