= Shahrabad Rural District (Firuzkuh County) =

Rural district in Tehran province, Iran

Shahrabad Rural District Persian: دهستان شهرآباد
- Rural District
- Location within Iran
- Coordinates: 35°47′N 52°42′E
- Country: Iran
- Province: Tehran
- County: Firuzkuh
- District: Central
- Established: 1987
- Capital: Shahrabad

Population (2016)
  - Total: 3,975
- Time zone: UTC+3:30 (IRST)

Shahrabad Rural District (Persian: دهستان شهرآباد) is in the Central District of Firuzkuh County, Tehran province, Iran. Its capital is the village of Shahrabad.

== Demographics ==
=== Population ===
At the time of the 2006 National Census, the rural district's population was 3,785 in 1,079 households. There were 3,738 inhabitants in 1,265 households at the following census of 2011. The 2016 census measured the population of the rural district as 3,975 in 1,448 households. The most populous of its 24 villages was Shahrabad, with 822 people.

=== Other villages in the rural district ===
- Bad Rud
- Dehin
- Harandeh
- Jeliz Jand
- Mahabad
- Tares
