= Ateshan, Kerman =

Ateshan اتشان
- Village
- Location within Iran
- Coordinates: 29°55′31″N 56°37′00″E
- Country: Iran
- Province: Kerman
- County: Bardsir
- Bakhsh: Central
- Rural District: Mashiz

Population (2006)
  - Total: 88
- Time zone: UTC+3:30 (IRST)
  - Summer (DST): UTC+4:30 (IRDT)

Ateshan (Persian: اتشان, also Romanized as Āteshān; also known as Āteshūn) is a village in Mashiz Rural District, in the Central District of Bardsir County, Kerman Province, Iran. At the 2006 census, its population was 88, in 22 families.
