= Vileyka district =

District of Minsk region, Belarus

Vileyka district Вілейскі раён (Belarusian) Вилейский район (Russian)
- District
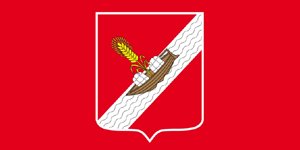
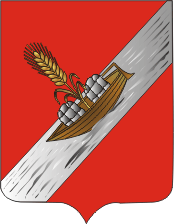
- Flag Coat of arms

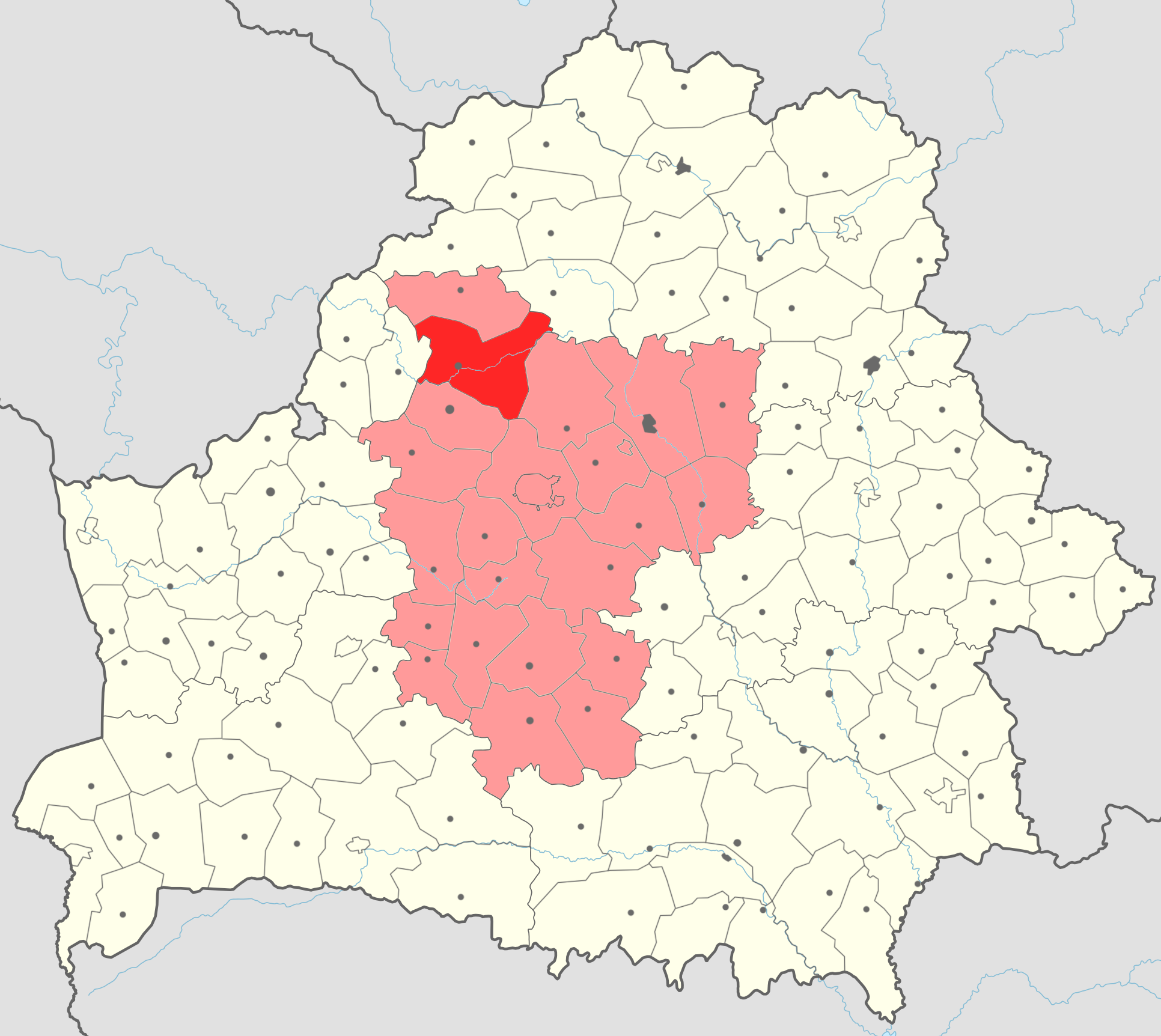
- Coordinates: 54°29′N 26°55′E
- Country: Belarus
- Region: Minsk region
- Administrative center: Vileyka

Area
  - District: 2,453 km^{2} (947 sq mi)

Population (2024)
  - District: 46,075
  - Density: 18.78/km^{2} (48.65/sq mi)
  - Urban: 26,625
  - Rural: 19,450
- Time zone: UTC+3 (MSK)

Vileyka district or Viliejka district (Belarusian: Вілейскі раён; Russian: Вилейский район) is a district (raion) of Minsk region in Belarus. The administrative center of the district is the town of Vileyka. As of 2024, it has a population of 46,075.

== Administrative-territorial structure ==

The district includes the city of district subordinance, Vileyka, and a number of selsoviets:

- Vyazyn rural council
- Dawhinava, Vileyka district rural council
- Izha rural council
- Ilya rural council
- Kryvoye Syalo rural council
- Kuranets rural council
- Lyuban, Vileyka district rural council
- Lyudvinova rural council
- Asipavichy, Vileyka district rural council
- Hatsenchytsy rural council

== Notable residents ==
- Janka Filistovič (1926, Paniacičy village – 1953), active participant in the Belarusian independence movement and a member of the underground anti-Soviet resistance in Belarus in the 1950s.
- Piotra Sych (1912, Baturyna village – 1963) - Belarusian writer and journalist, a Gulag prisoner
