= Central District (Firuzkuh County) =

District in Tehran province, Iran

Central District (Firuzkuh County) Persian: بخش مرکزی شهرستان فیروزکوه
- District
- Location within Iran
- Coordinates: 35°38′16″N 52°45′09″E
- Country: Iran
- Province: Tehran
- County: Firuzkuh
- Established: 1996
- Capital: Firuzkuh

Population (2016)
  - Total: 27,056
- Time zone: UTC+3:30 (IRST)

The Central District of Firuzkuh County (Persian: بخش مرکزی شهرستان فیروزکوه) is in Tehran province, Iran. Its capital is the city of Firuzkuh.

== Demographics ==
=== Population ===
At the time of the 2006 National Census, the district's population was 29,036 in 8,105 households. The following census in 2011 counted 32,359 people in 9,718 households. The 2016 census measured the population of the district as 27,056 inhabitants in 9,418 households.

=== Administrative divisions ===
Central District (Firuzkuh County) Population
Administrative Divisions	2006	2011	2016
Hablerud RD	4,884	3,983	2,883
Poshtkuh RD	4,560	4,267	2,745
Shahrabad RD	3,785	3,738	3,975
Firuzkuh (city)	15,807	20,371	17,453
Total	29,036	32,359	27,056
RD = Rural District
