= Firuzkuh County =

County in Tehran province, Iran

Firuzkuh County Persian: شهرستان فیروزکوه
- County
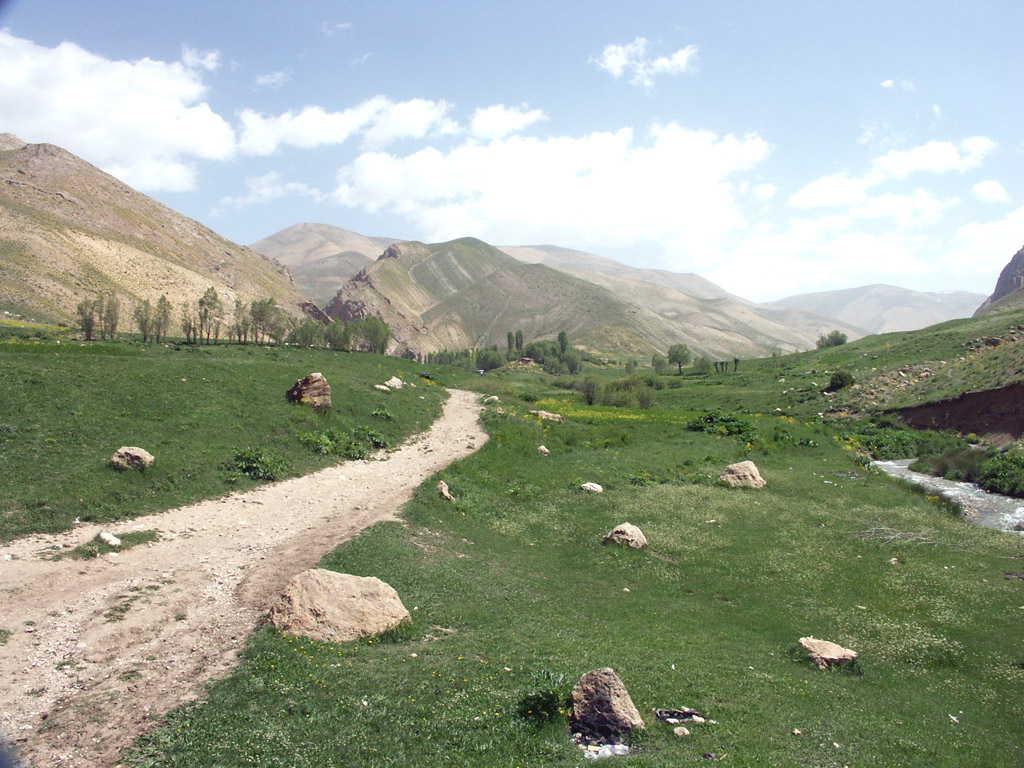
- Landscape near Tang-e Vashi

- Location of Firuzkuh County in Tehran province (right, yellow)

- Location of Tehran province in Iran
- Coordinates: 35°39′N 52°42′E
- Country: Iran
- Province: Tehran
- Established: 1996
- Capital: Firuzkuh
- Districts: Central, Arjomand

Area
  - Total: 2,386 km^{2} (921 sq mi)

Population (2016)
  - Total: 33,558
  - Density: 14.06/km^{2} (36.43/sq mi)
- Time zone: UTC+3:30 (IRST)

Firuzkuh County (Persian: شهرستان فیروزکوه) is in Tehran province, Iran. Its capital is the city of Firuzkuh.

== Demographics ==
=== Population ===
At the time of the 2006 National Census, the county's population was 37,416 in 10,414 households. The following census in 2011 counted 38,712 people in 11,828 households. The 2016 census measured the population of the county as 33,558 in 11,700 households.

=== Administrative divisions ===
Firuzkuh County's population history and administrative structure over three consecutive censuses are shown in the following table.

Firuzkuh County population
Administrative division	2006	2011	2016
Central District	29,036	32,359	27,056
Hablerud RD	4,884	3,983	2,883
Poshtkuh RD	4,560	4,267	2,745
Shahrabad RD	3,785	3,738	3,975
Firuzkuh (city)	15,807	20,371	17,453
Arjomand District	8,380	6,353	6,502
Doboluk RD	3,761	3,676	3,475
Qazqanchay RD	2,931	1,563	1,903
Arjomand (city)	1,688	1,114	1,124
Total	37,416	38,712	33,558
RD = rural district

== Climate ==
According to the information of the State Meteorological Organization of Iran, the long-term average annual rainfall of Firuzkuh is around 342.9 mm.

== See also ==
Media related to Firuzkuh County at Wikimedia Commons
