= Hamand =

Hamand or Homand (Persian: همند) may refer to:

- Hamand, Fars
- Hamand, Khusf, South Khorasan Province
- Hamand, Nehbandan, South Khorasan Province

== See also ==
- Hamand Khaleseh Vadan
- Hamand Kilan
- Hamand Kuhan va Kurdar
- Hamand Lamsar
