= Dozdabad =

Dozdabad دزدآباد
- Village
- Location within Iran
- Coordinates: 35°35′00″N 52°11′00″E
- Country: Iran
- Province: Tehran
- County: Damavand
- Bakhsh: Central
- Rural District: Jamabrud

Population (2016)
  - Total: 0
- Time zone: UTC+3:30 (IRST)

Dozdabad (Persian: دزدآباد, also Romanized as Dozdābād and Duzdābād) is a village in Jamabrud Rural District, in the Central District of Damavand County, Tehran Province, Iran. It is south of Luman village.

At the time of the 2006 National Census, the village's population was 6 in 4 households. The following census in 2011 counted 8 people in 4 households. The 2016 census the measured population of the village was 0.
