= Hablehrood =

River in Iran

Hablehrood Hablehrood
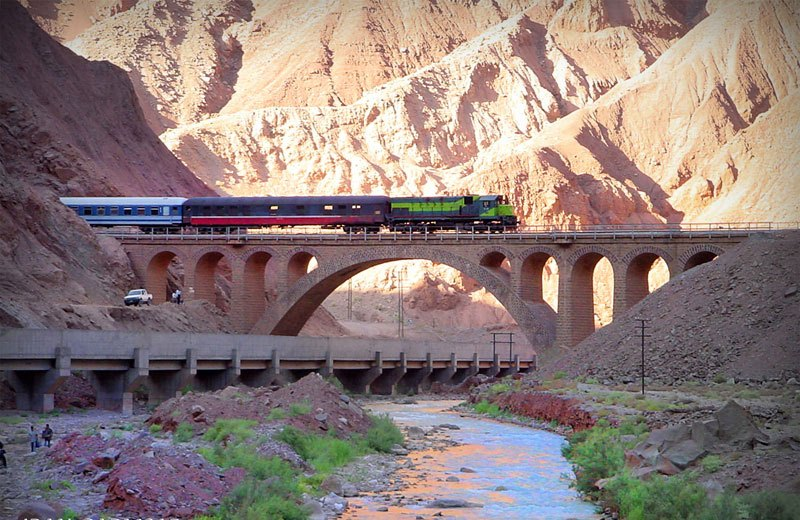

Location
- Country: Iran
- Province: Semnan province

Physical characteristics
- Source: Alborz
- Length: 2,800 m (1.7 mi)approx.
- Basin size: 3,200 square kilometres (1,200 sq mi)
- Discharge
  - average: 3,200 square kilometres (1,200 sq mi)

Basin features
- Tributaries: Goorsfid, Savashi, Nimrud, Ab Darreh-ye Dardeh, Delichai, Shahbolaghi, Ab-e Kabutardreh, Ab-e Darehshoor

Hablehrood (Persian: حبله‌رود) is a 240 km long river in the central desert catchment area of Iran.

Hablehrood originates from the Alborz and Shah Mohammad Qoleh and Homa mountain ranges at an altitude of about 2800 meters in the northeast of Firoozkooh. It passes through the northern slope of Marab Mountain, then changes its direction to the west, and first mixes with the Savashi River and is called Firuzkuh. Hablehrood is the only river that irrigates Garmsar cultivation area. Hablehrood is the habitat of Luciobarbus mursa.

Several tributararies called Goorsfid, Savashi, Nimrud, Ab Darreh-ye Dardeh, Delichai, Shahbolaghi, Ab-e Kabutardreh, Ab-e Darehshoor pour into Hablehrood. Hablehroud itself is the tributary of the river Galu; And its catchment area is 3200 square kilometers.

== Branches ==
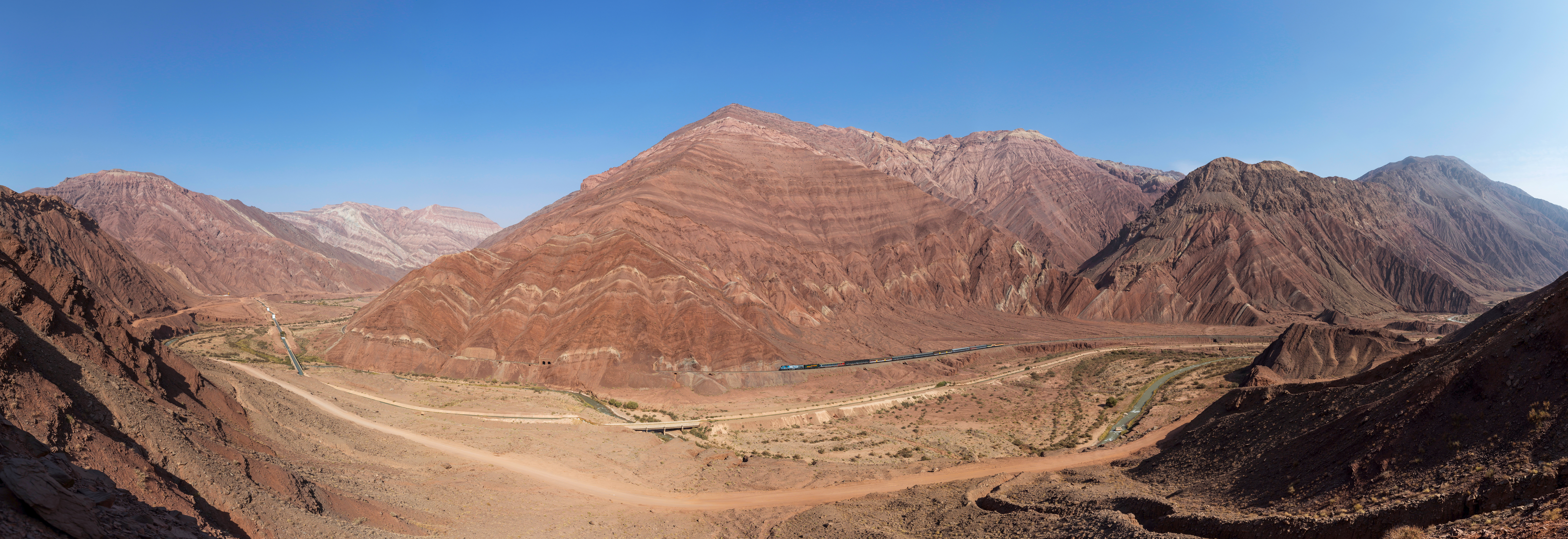

The branches of Hablehrood are:

1- Nimrud which originates from the snowy mountain and has two branches: one originates from Qazanchai and the mountains of Najafdar and Zaraiman and Vazna and the other flows from the Lazur and Arjomand heights and after passing the Farahrud block in a place called Doab-e Vashtan joins the Ghazanchai branch and flows through the Shelbon Strait called Nimrud.

2- Delichai (from Turkic meaning crazy river, and the reason for choosing this name is the high slope and the destructive erosion of this river in its bed). The source of this river is Tar and Momaj mountains located in Abarshiveh Rural District behind the mountain in the suburbs of Damavand and its water is supplied by melting snow and springs that gather in one place and create two small lakes next to each other. This river, after passing through the villages of Havir, Dehnar and Kahnak, passes through a place called Delichai, located on the Firoozkooh-Tehran Road, and while passing a long distance in Simin-Dasht, Hassanabad, in enters he Hablehrood.
