= Zeyarat-e Pain =

Zeyarat-e Pain زيارت پائين
- Village
- Location within Iran
- Coordinates: 35°33′55″N 52°10′48″E
- Country: Iran
- Province: Tehran
- County: Damavand
- Bakhsh: Central
- Rural District: Jamabrud

Population (2016)
  - Total: 0
- Time zone: UTC+3:30 (IRST)

Zeyarat-e Pain (Persian: زيارت پائين, also romanized as Zeyārat-e Pā’īn) is a village in Jamabrud Rural District, in the Central District of Damavand County, Tehran Province, Iran. It is a suburb of Kilan city.

At the time of the 2006 National Census, the village's population was 20 in 8 households. At the 2016 census the measured population of the village was 0.
