= Ahran =

Village in Tehran province, Iran

Ahran Persian: اهران
- Village
- Location within Iran
- Coordinates: 35°36′30″N 52°08′52″E
- Country: Iran
- Province: Tehran
- County: Damavand
- District: Central
- Rural District: Jamabrud

Population (2016)
  - Total: 554
- Time zone: UTC+3:30 (IRST)

Ahran (Persian: اهران) (Note: Also romanized as Ahrān) is a village in Jamabrud Rural District of the Central District in Damavand County, Tehran province, Iran.

== Demographics ==
=== Population ===
At the time of the 2006 National Census, the village's population was 467 in 113 households. The following census in 2011 counted 590 people in 169 households. The 2016 census measured the population of the village as 554 people in 175 households.
