= Jowzdar =

Jowzdar جوزدار
- Village
- Country: Iran
- Province: Tehran
- County: Damavand
- Bakhsh: Central
- Rural District: Jamabrud

Population (2006)
  - Total: 30
- Time zone: UTC+3:30 (IRST)

Jowzdar (Persian: جوزدار, also Romanized as Jowzdār) is a village in Jamabrud Rural District, in the Central District of Damavand County, Tehran Province, Iran. At the 2006 census, its population was 30, in 9 families. The village had less than 4 households in 2016.
