= Owchunak =

Village in Tehran province, Iran

Owchunak Persian: اوچونک
- Village
- Location within Iran
- Coordinates: 35°33′54″N 52°14′05″E
- Country: Iran
- Province: Tehran
- County: Damavand
- District: Central
- Rural District: Jamabrud
- Elevation: 1,840 m (6,040 ft)

Population (2016)
  - Total: 598
- Time zone: UTC+3:30 (IRST)

Owchunak (Persian: اوچونک) (Note: Also romanized as Ochūnak, Owchūnak, and Ūchūnak; also known as Oojoonak, Ūchainak, Ūchānak, and Ūchīnak) is a village in Jamabrud Rural District of the Central District in Damavand County, Tehran province, Iran.

== Demographics ==
=== Population ===
At the time of the 2006 National Census, the village's population was 471 in 170 households. The following census in 2011 counted 715 people in 255 households. The 2016 census measured the population of the village as 598 people in 203 households.
