= Tangeh =

Tangeh تنگه
- Village
- Location within Iran
- Coordinates: 35°29′23″N 52°03′01″E
- Country: Iran
- Province: Tehran
- County: Damavand
- Bakhsh: Central
- Rural District: Jamabrud

Population (2016)
  - Total: 71
- Time zone: UTC+3:30 (IRST)

Tangeh (Persian: تنگه) is a village in Jamabrud Rural District, in the Central District of Damavand County, Tehran Province, Iran.

At the time of the 2006 National Census, the village's population was 153 in 36 households. The following census in 2011 counted 65 people in 20 households. The 2016 census measured the population of the village as 71 people in 26 households.
