= Ajan, Tehran =

Ajan اجان
- Village
- Location within Iran
- Coordinates: 35°28′45″N 52°09′55″E
- Country: Iran
- Province: Tehran
- County: Damavand
- Bakhsh: Central
- Rural District: Jamabrud

Population (2011)
  - Total: 12
- Time zone: UTC+3:30 (IRST)

Ajan (Persian: اجان, also Romanized as Ājān) is a village in Jamabrud Rural District, in the Central District of Damavand County, Tehran Province, Iran.

At the time of the 2006 National Census, the village's population was 24 in 12 households. The following census in 2011 counted 12 people in 5 households. The 2016 census measured less than 4 households.
