= Bidak, Tehran =

Bidak بيدک
- village
- Location within Iran
- Coordinates: 35°36′00″N 52°09′00″E
- Country: Iran
- Province: Tehran
- County: Damavand
- Bakhsh: Central
- Rural District: Jamabrud
- Elevation: 1,900 m (6,200 ft)

Population (2016)
  - Total: 288
- Time zone: UTC+3:30 (IRST)

Bidak (Persian: بيدک, also Romanized as Bīdak) is a village in Jamabrud Rural District, in the Central District of Damavand County, Tehran Province, Iran. At the 2006 census, its population was 438, in 123 families.

At the time of the 2006 National Census, the village's population was 438 in 123 households. The following census in 2011 counted 321 people in 93 households. The 2016 census measured the population of the village as 288 people in 101 households.
