= Aru, Damavand =

Village in Tehran province, Iran

Aru Persian: آرو
- Village
- Location within Iran
- Coordinates: 35°40′11″N 52°24′13″E
- Country: Iran
- Province: Tehran
- County: Damavand
- District: Central
- Rural District: Abarshiveh
- Elevation: 2,350 m (7,710 ft)

Population (2016)
  - Total: 841
- Time zone: UTC+3:30 (IRST)

Aru (Persian: آرو) (Note: Also romanized as Ārū; also known as Arūd) is a village in Abarshiveh Rural District of the Central District in Damavand County, Tehran province, Iran.

== Demographics ==
=== Population ===
At the time of the 2006 National Census, the village's population was 1,057 in 304 households. The following census in 2011 counted 1,123 people in 371 households. The 2016 census measured the population of the village as 841 people in 276 households.
