= Vadan =

Village in Tehran province, Iran

Vadan Persian: وادان
- Village
- Location within Iran
- Coordinates: 35°35′45″N 52°08′45″E
- Country: Iran
- Province: Tehran
- County: Damavand
- District: Central
- Rural District: Jamabrud
- Elevation: 1,850 m (6,070 ft)

Population (2016)
  - Total: 1,305
- Time zone: UTC+3:30 (IRST)

Vadan (Persian: وادان) (Note: Also romanized as Vādān; also known as Wādūn) is a village in Jamabrud Rural District of the Central District in Damavand County, Tehran province, Iran.

== Demographics ==
=== Population ===
At the time of the 2006 National Census, the village's population was 1,627 in 447 households. The following census in 2011 counted 1,264 people in 356 households. The 2016 census measured the population of the village as 1,305 people in 393 households. It was the most populous village in its rural district.
