= Atabkashmas Owliad =

Atabkashmas Owlia اتابک شمس اولياء
- Village
- Interactive map of Atabkashmas Owlia
- Coordinates: 35.632°N 53.131°E
- Country: Iran
- Province: Tehran
- County: Damavand
- Bakhsh: Central
- Rural District: Jamabrud

Population (2016)
  - Total: 51
- Time zone: UTC+3:30 (IRST)

Atabkashmas Owlia (Persian: اتابک شمس اولياء, also romanized as Ātābḵashmas Owlīāɖ), also known as Atabak Olya, is a village in Jamabrud Rural District, in the Central District of Damavand County, Tehran Province, Iran.

At the time of the 2006 National Census, the village's population was 72 in 19 households. The following census in 2011 counted 91 people in 19 households. The 2016 census measured the population of the village as 51 people in 14 households.
