= Yahar =

Yahar يهر
- village
- Location within Iran
- Coordinates: 35°41′52″N 52°25′23″E
- Country: Iran
- Province: Tehran
- County: Damavand
- Bakhsh: Central
- Rural District: Abarshiveh
- Elevation: 2,320 m (7,610 ft)

Population (2016)
  - Total: 181
- Time zone: UTC+3:30 (IRST)

Yahar (Persian: يهر) is a village in Abarshiveh Rural District, in the Central District of Damavand County, Tehran Province, Iran. At the 2006 census, its population was 181, in 63 families. Increased from 64 people in 2006.
