= Do Ab, Tehran =

Do Ab دواب
- village
- Location within Iran
- Coordinates: 35°27′36″N 52°10′17″E
- Country: Iran
- Province: Tehran
- County: Damavand
- Bakhsh: Central
- Rural District: Jamabrud
- Elevation: 1,420 m (4,660 ft)

Population (2016)
  - Total: 28
- Time zone: UTC+3:30 (IRST)

Do Ab (Persian: دواب, also Romanized as Do Āb) is a village in Jamabrud Rural District, in the Central District of Damavand County, Tehran Province, Iran. It lies just north of the border with Semnan Province.

At the time of the 2006 National Census, the village's population was 36 in 14 households. The following census in 2011 counted 25 people in 9 households. The 2016 census measured the population of the village as 28 people in 9 households.
