= Hamand Lamsar =

Hamand Lamsar همند لمسار
- Village
- Interactive map of Hamand Lamsar
- Coordinates: 35.608°N 52.158°E
- Country: Iran
- Province: Tehran
- County: Damavand
- Bakhsh: Central
- Rural District: Jamabrud

Population (2011)
  - Total: 14
- Time zone: UTC+3:30 (IRST)

Hamand Lamsar (Persian: همند لمسار, also Romanized as Hamand Lamsār) is a village in Jamabrud Rural District, in the Central District of Damavand County, Tehran Province, Iran. It is a southern suburb of Absard city.

At the time of the 2006 National Census, the village's population was 11 in 5 households. The following census in 2011 counted 14 people in 4 households. In the 2016 census the village had less than 4 households.
