= Zeyarat-e Bala =

Zeyarat-e Bala زيارت بالا
- village
- Location within Iran
- Coordinates: 35°33′55″N 52°10′48″E
- Country: Iran
- Province: Tehran
- County: Damavand
- Bakhsh: Central
- Rural District: Jamabrud
- Elevation: 1,780 m (5,840 ft)

Population (2016)
  - Total: 60
- Time zone: UTC+3:30 (IRST)

Zeyarat-e Bala (Persian: زيارت بالا, also Romanized as Zeyārat-e Bālā; also known as Zeyārat) is a village in Jamabrud Rural District, in the Central District of Damavand County, Tehran Province, Iran. At the 2006 census, its population was 97, in 45 families.

At the time of the 2006 National Census, the village's population was 97 in 45 households. The following census in 2011 counted 75 people in 34 households. The 2016 census measured the population of the village as 60 people in 27 households.
