= Rudafshan =

Rudafshan رودافشان
- village
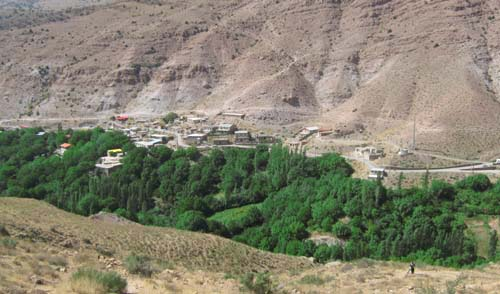

- Location within Iran
- Coordinates: 35°38′26″N 52°30′05″E
- Country: Iran
- Province: Tehran
- County: Damavand
- Bakhsh: Central
- Rural District: Abarshiveh
- Elevation: 1,800 m (5,900 ft)

Population (2016)
  - Total: 54
- Time zone: UTC+3:30 (IRST)

Rudafshan (Persian: رودافشان, also Romanized as Rūdafshān) is a village in Abarshiveh Rural District, in the Central District of Damavand County, Tehran Province, Iran. At the 2016 census, its population was 54, in 19 families. Up from 47 in 2006.

== Tourism ==
Rudafshan Cave is one of the tourist attractions near Tehran City, which is located in a village in Damavand County.
