= Shah Bolaghi =

Shah Bolaghi شاه بلاغی
- village
- Location within Iran
- Coordinates: 35°36′09″N 52°21′41″E
- Country: Iran
- Province: Tehran
- County: Damavand
- Bakhsh: Central
- Rural District: Abarshiveh
- Elevation: 2,040 m (6,690 ft)

Population (2006)
  - Total: 9
- Time zone: UTC+3:30 (IRST)

Shah Bolaghi (Persian: شاه بلاغی, also Romanized as Shāh Bolāghī) is a village in Abarshiveh Rural District, in the Central District of Damavand County, Tehran Province, Iran. At the 2006 census, its population was 9, in 6 families. In 2016, there were no households residing in the village.
