= Seyyedabad, Damavand =

Seyyedabad سيدآباد
- village
- Location within Iran
- Coordinates: 35°38′33″N 52°22′31″E
- Country: Iran
- Province: Tehran
- County: Damavand
- Bakhsh: Central
- Rural District: Abarshiveh
- Elevation: 2,100 m (6,900 ft)

Population (2016)
  - Total: 492
- Time zone: UTC+3:30 (IRST)

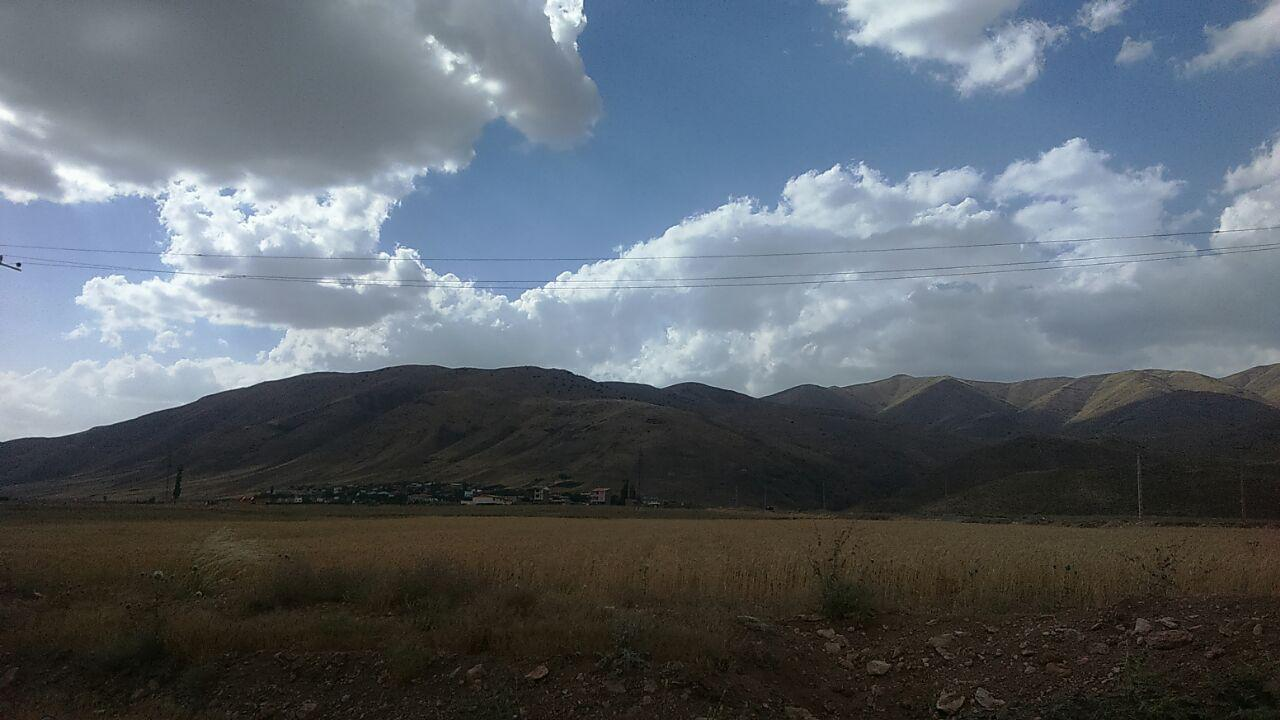
view from Seyyedabad

Seyyedabad (Persian: سيدآباد, also Romanized as Seyyedābād, Saidābād, and Saiyidābād) is a village in Abarshiveh Rural District, in the Central District of Damavand County, Tehran Province, Iran. At the 2016 census, its population was 492, in 161 families. Increased from 293 people in 2006.
