= Rostamabad, Damavand =

Rostamabad رستم آباد
- Village
- Location within Iran
- Coordinates: 35°37′00″N 52°06′00″E
- Country: Iran
- Province: Tehran
- County: Damavand
- Bakhsh: Central
- Rural District: Jamabrud

Population (2006)
  - Total: 19
- Time zone: UTC+3:30 (IRST)

Rostamabad (Persian: رستم آباد, also Romanized as Rostamābād) is a village in Jamabrud Rural District, in the Central District of Damavand County, Tehran Province, Iran.

At the time of the 2006 National Census, the village's population was 19 people. The 2011 and 2016 census results counted less than 4 households.
