= Saqqez Darreh =

Saqqez Darreh سقزدره
- village
- Location within Iran
- Coordinates: 35°30′52″N 52°22′41″E
- Country: Iran
- Province: Tehran
- County: Damavand
- Bakhsh: Central
- Rural District: Abarshiveh
- Elevation: 1,900 m (6,200 ft)

Population (2016)
  - Total: 20
- Time zone: UTC+3:30 (IRST)

Saqqez Darreh (Persian: سقزدره, also Romanized as Saqez Darreh; also known as Saqqez Darreh-ye Bālā and Qez Darreh) is a village in Abarshiveh Rural District, in the Central District of Damavand County, Tehran Province, Iran. At the 2006 census, its population was 20, in 4 families. Decreased from 37 people in 2006.
