= Garm Absard =

Village in Tehran province, Iran

Garm Absard Persian: گرمابسرد
- Village
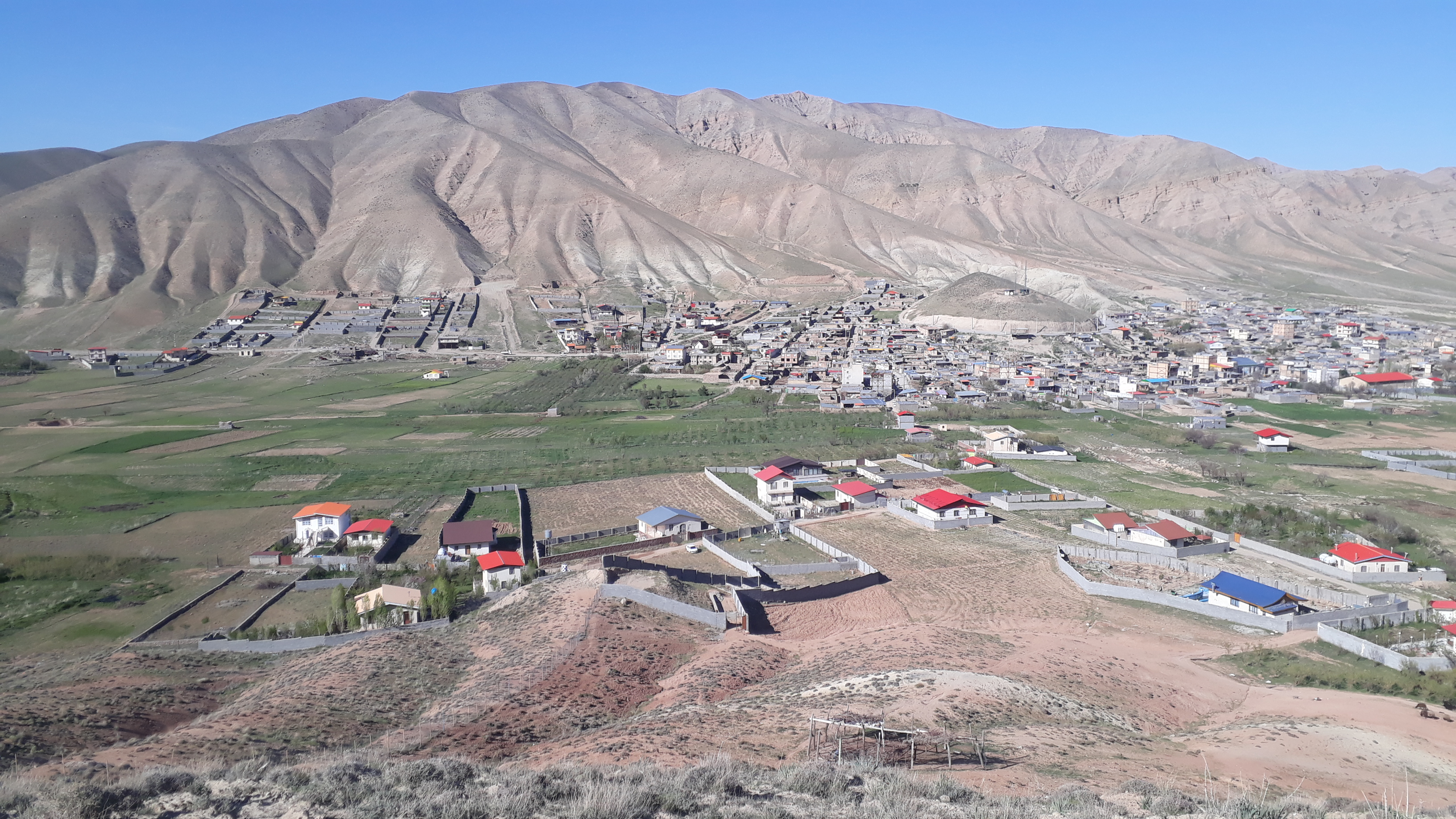
- The village of Garm Absard

- Location within Iran
- Coordinates: 35°28′05″N 52°21′07″E
- Country: Iran
- Province: Tehran
- County: Damavand
- District: Central
- Rural District: Abarshiveh
- Elevation: 1,950 m (6,400 ft)

Population (2016)
  - Total: 844
- Time zone: UTC+3:30 (IRST)

Garm Absard (Persian: گرمابسرد) (Note: Also romanized as Garm Ābsard; also known as Garmābsar) is a village in Abarshiveh Rural District of the Central District in Damavand County, Tehran province, Iran.

== Demographics ==
=== Population ===
At the time of the 2006 National Census, the village's population was 899 in 246 households. The 2011 census counted 727 people in 234 households. The 2016 census recorded the village's population as 844 people in 265 households.
