= Atabak-e Kati =

Atabak-e Kati اتابک كتی
- Village
- Location within Iran
- Coordinates: 35°38′01″N 52°07′51″E
- Country: Iran
- Province: Tehran
- County: Damavand
- Bakhsh: Central
- Rural District: Jamabrud

Population (2016)
  - Total: 103
- Time zone: UTC+3:30 (IRST)

Atabak-e Kati (Persian: اتابک كتی, also Romanized as Atābak-e Katī; also known as Atābak-e Pā’īn, Atabak-e Sofla and Atābak) is a village in Jamabrud Rural District, in the Central District of Damavand County, Tehran Province, Iran.

At the time of the 2006 National Census, the village's population was 146 in 45 households. The following census in 2011 counted 175 people in 45 households. The 2016 census measured the population of the village as 103 people in 32 households.
