= Zan, Tehran =

Village in Tehran province, Iran

Zana Persian: زانا
- Village
- Location within Iran
- Coordinates: 35°35′41″N 52°11′55″E
- Country: Iran
- Province: Tehran
- County: Damavand
- District: Central
- Rural District: Jamabrud
- Elevation: 1,960 m (6,430 ft)

Population (2016)
  - Total: 713
- Time zone: UTC+3:30 (IRST)

Zan or Zana (Persian: زانا) (Note: Also romanized as Zān) is a village in Jamabrud Rural District of the Central District in Damavand County, Tehran province, Iran.

== Demographics ==
=== Population ===
At the time of the 2006 National Census, the village's population was 396 in 130 households. The following census in 2011 counted 804 people in 239 households. The 2016 census measured the population of the village as 713 people in 258 households.
