= Kelak, Tehran =

Kelak کلاک
- Village
- Location within Iran
- Coordinates: 35°37′05″N 52°25′36″E
- Country: Iran
- Province: Tehran
- County: Damavand
- Bakhsh: Central
- Rural District: Abarshiveh

Population (2016)
  - Total: 92
- Time zone: UTC+3:30 (IRST)

Kelak (Persian: کلاک, also Romanized as Kelāk or Kalāk) is a village in Abarshiveh Rural District, in the Central District of Damavand County, Tehran Province, Iran. At the 2016 census, its population was 92, in 40 families. Down from 156 people in 2006.
