= Darakhtbid =

Darakhtbid درختبيد
- village
- Interactive map of Darakhtbid
- Coordinates: 35°35′47.13″N 52°19′33.874″E
- Country: Iran
- Province: Tehran
- County: Damavand
- Bakhsh: Central
- Rural District: Abarshiveh
- Elevation: 2,060 m (6,760 ft)

Population (2006)
  - Total: 10
- Time zone: UTC+3:30 (IRST)

Darakhtbid (Persian: درختبيد, also Romanized as Darakhtbīd) is a village in Abarshiveh Rural District, in the Central District of Damavand County, Tehran Province, Iran. At the 2006 census, its population was 10, in 4 families. In 2016, there were no households residing in the village.
