= Ayeneh Varzan =

Village in Tehran province, Iran

Ayeneh Varzan Persian: آیینه ورزان
- Village
- Location within Iran
- Coordinates: 35°39′40″N 52°12′19″E
- Country: Iran
- Province: Tehran
- County: Damavand
- District: Central
- Rural District: Abarshiveh
- Elevation: 2,150 m (7,050 ft)

Population (2016)
  - Total: 1,156
- Time zone: UTC+3:30 (IRST)

Ayeneh Varzan (Persian: آینه ورزان) (Note: Also romanized as Āyeneh Varzān; also known as ‘Ain-i-Varzān and ‘Eyn Varzān) is a village in Abarshiveh Rural District of the Central District in Damavand County, Tehran province, Iran.

== Demographics ==
=== Population ===
At the time of the 2006 National Census, the village's population was 889 in 246 households. The following census in 2011 counted 924 people in 278 households. The 2016 census measured the population of the village as 1,156 people in 338 households.
