= Mashhad-e Firuzkuh =

Mashhad-e Firuzkuh مشهدفيروزكوه
- village
- Location within Iran
- Coordinates: 35°36′13″N 52°28′32″E
- Country: Iran
- Province: Tehran
- County: Damavand
- Bakhsh: Central
- Rural District: Abarshiveh
- Elevation: 1,750 m (5,740 ft)

Population (2016)
  - Total: 139
- Time zone: UTC+3:30 (IRST)

Mashhad-e Firuzkuh (Persian: مشهدفيروزكوه, also Romanized as Mashhad-e Fīrūzḵūh; also known as Mashhad) is a village in Abarshiveh Rural District, in the Central District of Damavand County, Tehran Province, Iran. At the 2006 census, its population was 154, in 54 families. In 2016, its population was 139, in 64 households.
