= Hamand Kilan =

Hamand Kilan همند كيلان
- village
- Interactive map of Hamand Kilan
- Coordinates: 35.633°N 52.167°E
- Country: Iran
- Province: Tehran
- County: Damavand
- Bakhsh: Central
- Rural District: Jamabrud
- Elevation: 1,700–1,800 m (5,600–5,900 ft)

Population (2011)
  - Total: 11
- Time zone: UTC+3:30 (IRST)

Hamand Kilan (Persian: همند كيلان, also Romanized as Hamand Kīlān) is a village in Jamabrud Rural District, in the Central District of Damavand County, Tehran Province, Iran. It is a suburb of Absard city.

At the time of the 2006 National Census, the village's population was 12 in 8 households. The following census in 2011 counted 11 people in 4 households. The 2016 census measured less than 4 households.
