= Yadreh =

Yadreh يدره
- Village
- Location within Iran
- Coordinates: 35°37′16″N 52°26′10″E
- Country: Iran
- Province: Tehran
- County: Damavand
- Bakhsh: Central
- Rural District: Abarshiveh

Population (2016)
  - Total: 19
- Time zone: UTC+3:30 (IRST)

Yadreh (Persian: يدره) is a village in Abarshiveh Rural District, in the Central District of Damavand County, Tehran Province, Iran. At the 2016 census, its population was 19, in 6 families. Decreased from 46 people in 2006.
