= Hashemak =

Hashemak هاشمک
- village
- Location within Iran
- Coordinates: 35°37′00″N 52°04′00″E
- Country: Iran
- Province: Tehran
- County: Damavand
- Bakhsh: Central
- Rural District: Jamabrud
- Elevation: 2,040 m (6,690 ft)

Population (2016)
  - Total: 86
- Time zone: UTC+3:30 (IRST)

Hashemak (Persian: هاشمک, also Romanized as Hāshemak) is a village in Jamabrud Rural District, in the Central District of Damavand County, Tehran Province, Iran.

At the time of the 2006 National Census, the village's population was 111 in 30 households. The following census in 2011 counted 119 people in 38 households. The 2016 census measured the population of the village as 86 people in 25 households.
