= Mumej =

Mumej مومج
- village
- Location within Iran
- Coordinates: 35°42′16″N 52°22′40″E
- Country: Iran
- Province: Tehran
- County: Damavand
- Bakhsh: Central
- Rural District: Abarshiveh
- Elevation: 2,360 m (7,740 ft)

Population (2016)
  - Total: 403
- Time zone: UTC+3:30 (IRST)

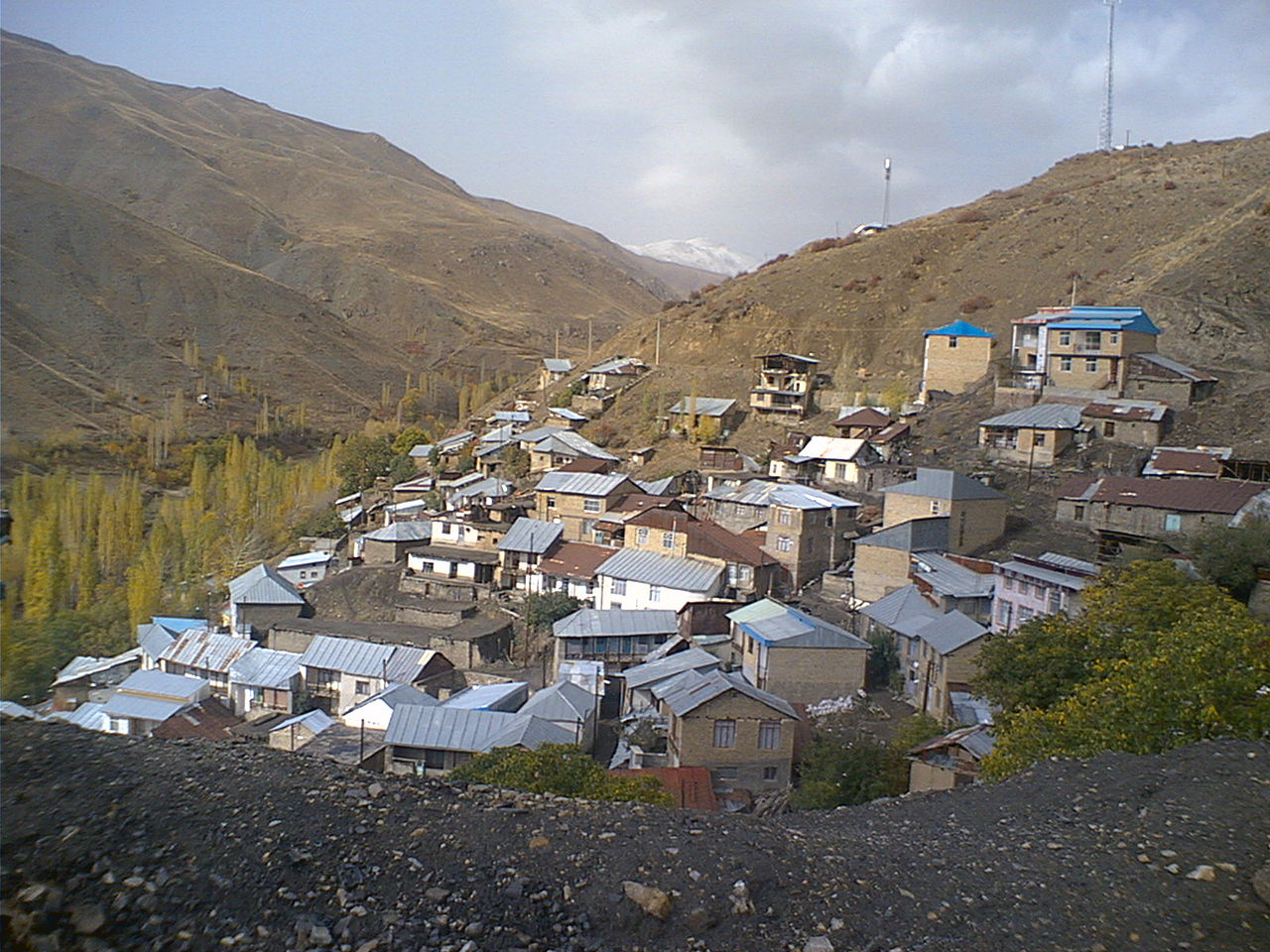
Mumej Village, Damavand

Mumej (Persian: مومج, also Romanized as Mūmej, Mowmej, Mūmaj, and Mūmech) is a village in Abarshiveh Rural District, in the Central District of Damavand County, Tehran Province, Iran. At the 2006 census, its population was 403, in 159 families. Increased from 242 people in 2006.
