= Vardaneh =

Vardaneh وردانه
- village
- Interactive map of Vardaneh
- Coordinates: 35.481°N 52.506°E
- Country: Iran
- Province: Tehran
- County: Damavand
- Bakhsh: Central
- Rural District: Jamabrud
- Elevation: 1,520 m (4,990 ft)

Population (2016)
  - Total: 231
- Time zone: UTC+3:30 (IRST)

Vardaneh (Persian: وردانه, also Romanized as Vardāneh) is a village in Jamabrud Rural District, in the Central District of Damavand County, Tehran Province, Iran.

At the time of the 2006 National Census, the village's population was 113 in 45 households. The following census in 2011 counted 99 people in 35 households. The 2016 census measured the population of the village as 231 people in 90 households.
