= Bulan, Tehran =

Bulan بولان
- village
- Location within Iran
- Coordinates: 35°30′55″N 52°05′38″E
- Country: Iran
- Province: Tehran
- County: Damavand
- Bakhsh: Central
- Rural District: Jamabrud
- Elevation: 1,800 m (5,900 ft)

Population (2016)
  - Total: 100
- Time zone: UTC+3:30 (IRST)

Bulan (Persian: بولان, also Romanized as Būlān, Bolān, Boolan, and Bowlān) is a village in Jamabrud Rural District, in the Central District of Damavand County, Tehran Province, Iran.

At the time of the 2006 National Census, the village's population was 118 in 27 households. The following census in 2011 counted 75 people in 24 households. The 2016 census measured the population of the village as 100 people in 33 households.
