= Hamand Khaleseh Vadan =

Hamand Khaleseh Vadan همند خالصه وادان
- Village
- Interactive map of Hamand Khaleseh Vadan
- Coordinates: 35.654°N 52.086°E
- Country: Iran
- Province: Tehran
- County: Damavand
- Bakhsh: Central
- Rural District: Jamabrud

Population (2016)
  - Total: 0
- Time zone: UTC+3:30 (IRST)

Hamand Khaleseh Vadan (Persian: همندخالصه وادان, also romanized as Hamand Khāleṣeh Vādān) is a village in Jamabrud Rural District, in the Central District of Damavand County, Tehran Province, Iran.

At the time of the 2006 National Census, the village's population was 40 in 9 households. The following census in 2011 counted 4 people in 4 households. The 2016 census the measured population was 0.
