= Kahnak, Tehran =

Kahnak کهنک
- Village
- Location within Iran
- Coordinates: 35°41′25″N 52°29′18″E
- Country: Iran
- Province: Tehran
- County: Damavand
- Bakhsh: Central
- Rural District: Abarshiveh

Population (2016)
  - Total: 89
- Time zone: UTC+3:30 (IRST)

Kahnak (Persian: کهنک, also Romanized as Kohnak; also known as Kahang) is a village in Abarshiveh Rural District, in the Central District of Damavand County, Tehran Province, Iran. At the 2006 census, its population was 89, in 37 families. Down from 103 in 2006.
