= Salehabad, Damavand =

Salehabad صالح آباد
- Village
- Interactive map of Salehabad
- Coordinates: 35.633°N 52.084°E
- Country: Iran
- Province: Tehran
- County: malard
- Bakhsh: Central
- Rural District: Jamabrud

Population (2006)
  - Total: 28
- Time zone: UTC+3:30 (IRST)

Salehabad (Persian: صالح آباد, also Romanized as Şāleḩābād) is a village in the Central District of Malard County, Tehran Province, Iran.

At the time of the 2006 National Census, the village's population was 28 in 12 households. The 2011 and 2016 census results counted less than 4 households.
