= Hamand Kuhan va Kurdar =

Hamand Kuhan va Kurdar همند كوهان و كردر
- Village
- Interactive map of Hamand Kuhan va Kurdar
- Coordinates: 35.636°N 52.182°E
- Country: Iran
- Province: Tehran
- County: Damavand
- Bakhsh: Central
- Rural District: Jamabrud

Population (2011)
  - Total: 26
- Time zone: UTC+3:30 (IRST)

Hamand Kuhan va Kurdar (Persian: همند كوهان و كردر, also Romanized as Hamand Kūhān va Kurdar) is a village in Jamabrud Rural District, in the Central District of Damavand County, Tehran Province, Iran.

At the time of the 2006 National Census, the village's population was 45 in 37 households. The following census in 2011 counted 26 people in 11 households. At the 2016 census the village had less than 4 households.
