= Dehnar, Tehran =

Dehnar دهنار
- village
- Location within Iran
- Coordinates: 35°42′32″N 52°20′54″E
- Country: Iran
- Province: Tehran
- County: Damavand
- Bakhsh: Central
- Rural District: Abarshiveh
- Elevation: 2,420 m (7,940 ft)

Population (2016)
  - Total: 272
- Time zone: UTC+3:30 (IRST)

Dehnar (Persian: دهنار, also Romanized as Dehnār) is a village in Abarshiveh Rural District, in the Central District of Damavand County, Tehran Province, Iran. At the 2016 census, its population was 272 people in 91 households.
