= Jaban, Tehran =

Village in Tehran province, Iran

Jaban Persian: جابان
- Village
- Location within Iran
- Coordinates: 35°38′49″N 52°15′05″E
- Country: Iran
- Province: Tehran
- County: Damavand
- District: Central
- Rural District: Abarshiveh
- Elevation: 2,200 m (7,200 ft)

Population (2016)
  - Total: 2,500
- Time zone: UTC+3:30 (IRST)

Jaban (Persian: جابان) (Note: Also romanized as Jābān; also known as Jāhbun) is a village in Abarshiveh Rural District of the Central District in Damavand County, Tehran province, Iran.

== Demographics ==
=== Population ===
At the time of the 2006 National Census, the village's population was 2,540 in 757 households. The following census in 2011 counted 2,371 people in 771 households. The 2016 census measured the population of the village as 2,500 people in 796 households.
