= Khosrovan =

Khosrovan خسروان
- village
- Location within Iran
- Coordinates: 35°39′29″N 52°13′43″E
- Country: Iran
- Province: Tehran
- County: Damavand
- Bakhsh: Central
- Rural District: Abarshiveh
- Elevation: 2,240 m (7,350 ft)

Population (2016)
  - Total: 230
- Time zone: UTC+3:30 (IRST)

Khosrovan (Persian: خسروان, also Romanized as Khosrovān and Khosravān) is a village in Abarshiveh Rural District, in the Central District of Damavand County, Tehran Province, Iran. At the 2016 census, its population was 230, in 66 families. Up from 126 people in 2006.
