= Sorkheh Deh, Tehran =

Sorkheh Deh سرخه ده
- village
- Location within Iran
- Coordinates: 35°35′51″N 52°16′25″E
- Country: Iran
- Province: Tehran
- County: Damavand
- Bakhsh: Central
- Rural District: Abarshiveh
- Elevation: 1,950 m (6,400 ft)

Population (2016)
  - Total: 447
- Time zone: UTC+3:30 (IRST)

Sorkheh Deh (Persian: سرخه ده, also Romanized as Surkhdeh) is a village in Abarshiveh Rural District, in the Central District of Damavand County, Tehran Province, Iran. At the 2016 census, its population was 447, in 182 families. Down from 617 people in 2006.
