= Luman, Iran =

Village in Tehran province, Iran

Luman Persian: لومان
- Village
- Location within Iran
- Coordinates: 35°35′17″N 52°11′02″E
- Country: Iran
- Province: Tehran
- County: Damavand
- District: Central
- Rural District: Jamabrud
- Elevation: 1,880 m (6,170 ft)

Population (2016)
  - Total: 337
- Time zone: UTC+3:30 (IRST)

Luman (Persian: لومان) (Note: Also romanized as Lūmān) is a village in Jamabrud Rural District of the Central District in Damavand County, Tehran province, Iran.

According to the history of the village, Agha Jan Hasannajari was its most famous person, having built a mosque and the first public bath in Luman. The village consists of several major families, such as the Hasannajari and Khalili.

== Demographics ==
=== Population ===
At the time of the 2006 National Census, the village's population was 207 in 98 households. The following census in 2011 counted 306 people in 105 households. The 2016 census measured the population of the village as 337 people in 117 households.
