= Sarbandan =

Village in Tehran province, Iran

Sarbandan Persian: سربندان
- Village
- Location within Iran
- Coordinates: 35°38′20″N 52°18′49″E
- Country: Iran
- Province: Tehran
- County: Damavand
- District: Central
- Rural District: Abarshiveh
- Elevation: 2,150 m (7,050 ft)

Population (2016)
  - Total: 3,352
- Time zone: UTC+3:30 (IRST)
- Website: dehyari-sarbandan.ir

Sarbandan (Persian: سربندان) (Note: Also romanized as Sarbandān) is a village in, and the capital of, Abarshiveh Rural District in the Central District of Damavand County, Tehran province, Iran.

== Demographics ==
=== Language and ethnicity ===
The people of the town of Sarbandan, as well as neighboring Jaban, Sorkhdeh and Khosravan, are Kurds and speak the Kurmanji dialect of Kurdish language.

=== Population ===
At the time of the 2006 National Census, the village's population was 2,304 in 618 households. The following census in 2011 counted 2,415 people in 744 households. The 2016 census measured the population of the village as 3,352 people in 823 households. It was the most populous village in its rural district.

== Overview ==
The village of Sarbandan is between of Jaban and Seid abad villages. The reason for this name is the abundance of water in Sarbandan which supplies the water to downstream villages.

Sarbandan's good weather and fresh water attract many tourists in summer. Many vegetables and fruits are produced in Sarbandan's farms. The local walnuts, cucumbers and apples are flavourful and thus exported to other cities or countries.
