= Havir =

Havir (Persian: حوير or هوير) may refer to:

- Havir, Khuzestan (حوير) - Ḩavīr
- Havir, Tehran (هوير) - Havīr
