= Havir, Tehran =

Havir هوير
- village
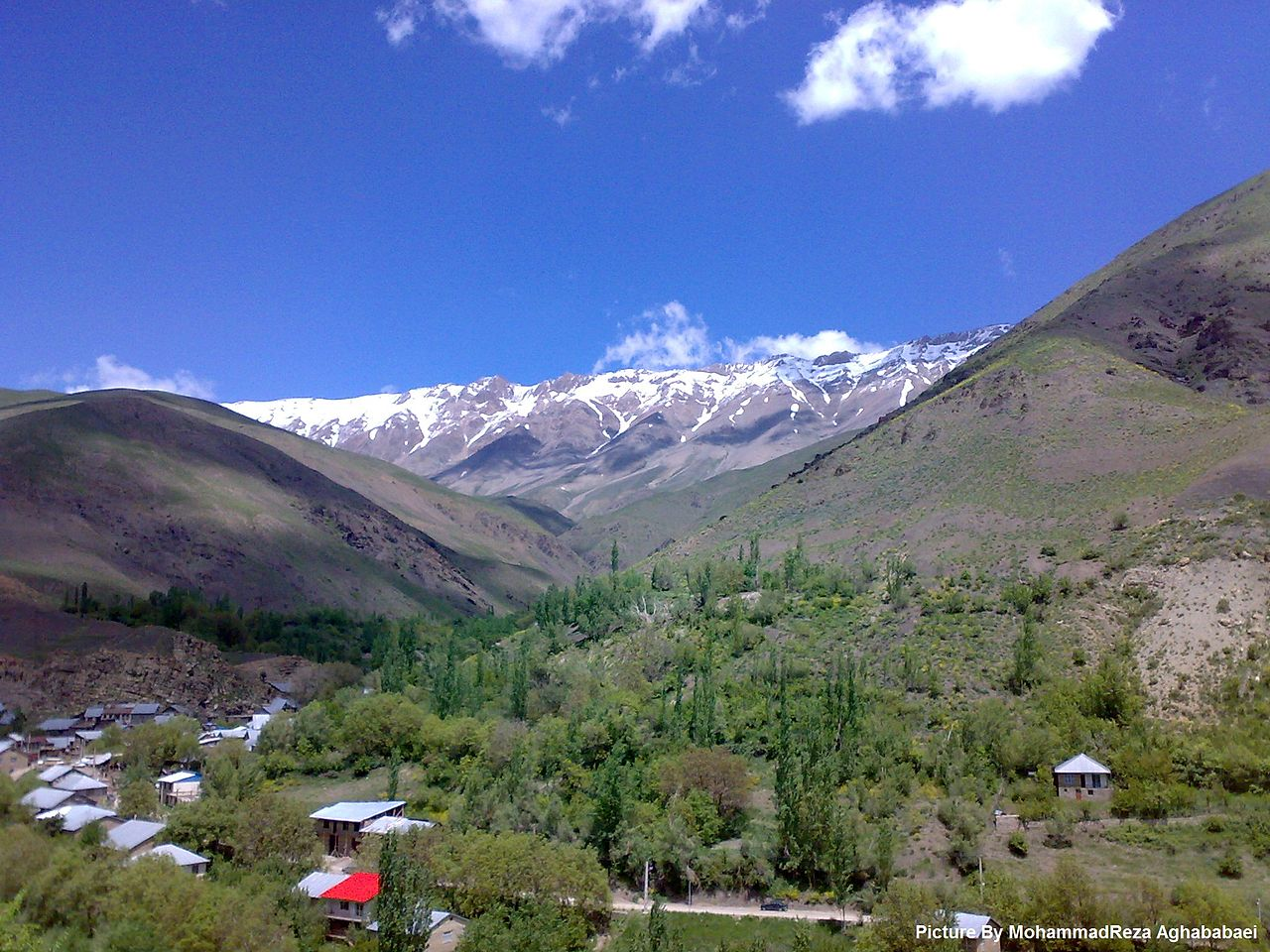

- Location within Iran
- Coordinates: 35°42′52″N 52°19′15″E
- Country: Iran
- Province: Tehran
- County: Damavand
- Bakhsh: Central
- Rural District: Abarshiveh
- Elevation: 2,480 m (8,140 ft)

Population (2016)
  - Total: 303
- Time zone: UTC+3:30 (IRST)
- Website: https://www.instagram.com/havir_damavand/

Havir (Persian: هوير, also Romanized as Havīr, Hovīr, and Howvīr) is a village in Abarshiveh Rural District, in the Central District of Damavand County, Tehran Province, Iran. At the 2006 census, its population was 303, in 108 families. Increased from 190 people in 2006.

== Image Gallery ==
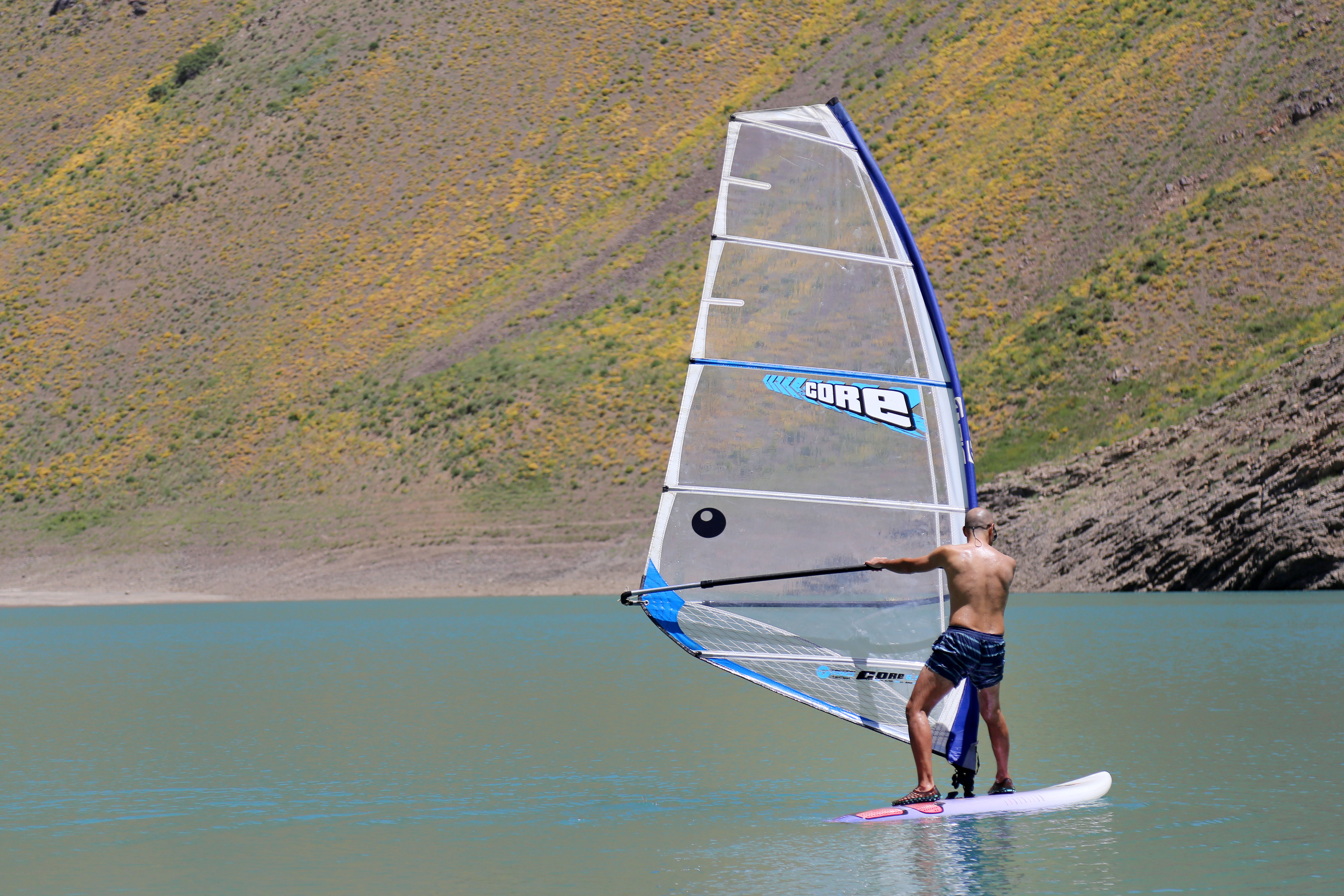
Havir Lake, Tehran Province, Iran

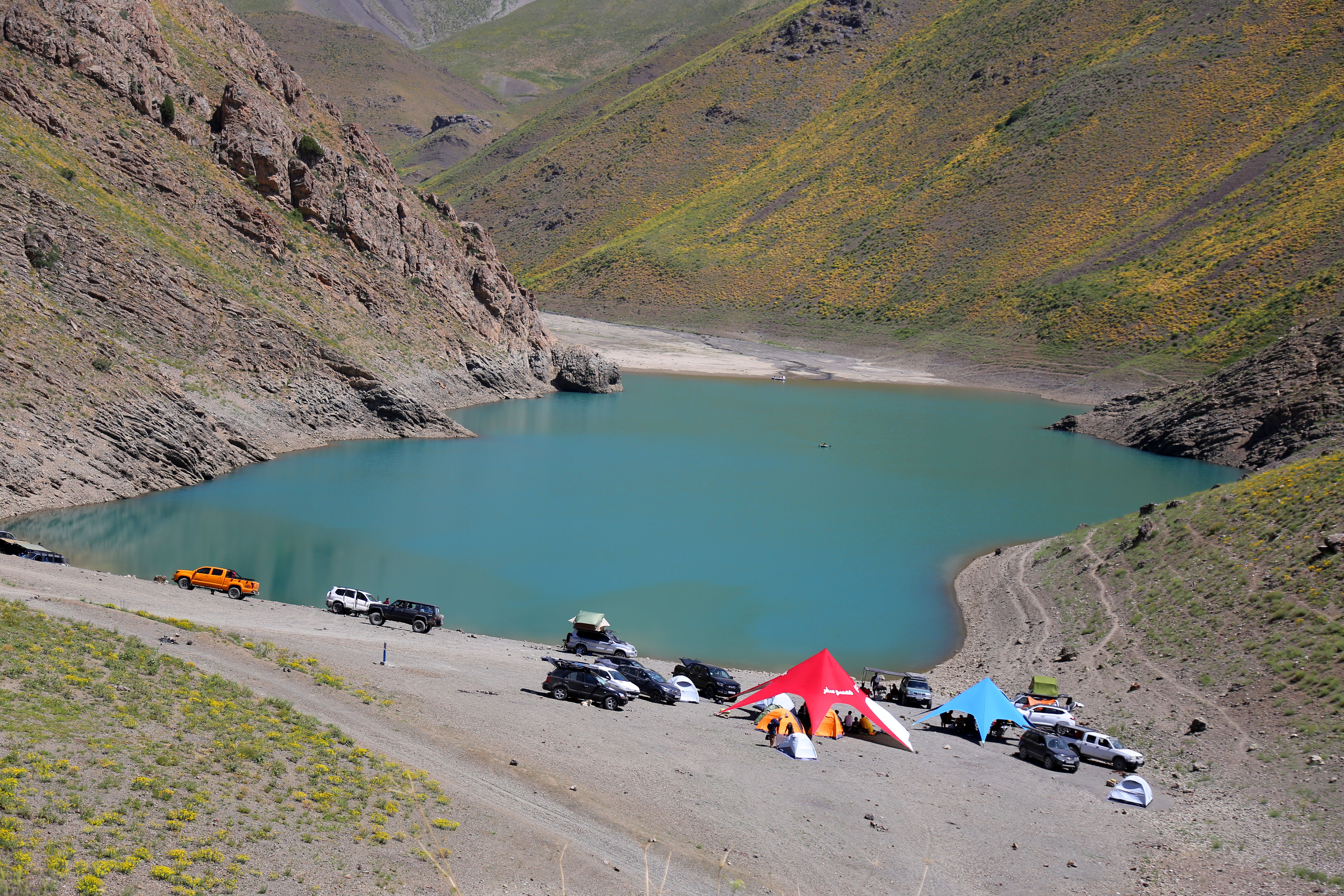
Havir Lake, Tehran Province, Iran
