= Jamabrud Rural District =

Rural district in Tehran province, Iran

Jamabrud Rural District Persian: دهستان جمع آبرود
- Rural District
- Location within Iran
- Coordinates: 35°34′N 52°08′E
- Country: Iran
- Province: Tehran
- County: Damavand
- District: Central
- Established: 1987
- Capital: Absard

Population (2016)
  - Total: 4,635
- Time zone: UTC+3:30 (IRST)

Jamabrud Rural District (Persian: دهستان جمع آبرود) is in the Central District of Damavand County, Tehran province, Iran. It is administered from the city of Absard.

== Demographics ==
=== Population ===
At the time of the 2006 National Census, the rural district's population was 4,773 in 1,476 households. There were 4,878 inhabitants in 1,498 households at the following census of 2011. The 2016 census measured the population of the rural district as 4,635 in 1,544 households. The most populous of its 73 villages was Vadan, with 1,305 people.

=== Other villages in the rural district ===
- Ahran
- Ajan
- Atabak-e Kati
- Atabkashmas Owliad
- Bidak
- Bulan
- Do Ab
- Dozdabad
- Hamand Khaleseh Vadan
- Hamand Kilan
- Hamand Kuhan va Kurdar
- Hamand Lamsar
- Hashemak
- Jowzdar
- Luman
- Owchunak
- Rostamabad
- Salehabad
- Tangeh
- Vardaneh
- Zan
- Zeyarat-e Bala
- Zeyarat-e Pain
