= Islamic Azad University, Garmsar Branch =

- دانشگاه آزاد اسلامی واحد گرمسار; Danushgah-e Âzad-e Eslâmi-ye Vahed-e Gârmisar
- Type: Private
- Established: 1988; 38 years ago
- President: Abdollah Jasbi
- Students: 13,000
- Location: Garmsar, Semnan Province, Iran
- Campus: Urban
- Athletics: ? teams
- Website: www.iau-garmsar.ac.ir

The Islamic Azad University, Garmsar Branch is a branch of Iran's Islamic Azad Universities. It is situated in the city of Garmsar 82 kilometers southeast of Tehran.

== History ==
This university started its work with two majors (veterinary and arabic literature) in 1988. It was then situated in Garmsar's university street. At present, it has 204 faculty members, and about 13,000 students in B.S. and M.S. and D.V.M of 85 majors.

== See also ==
- Higher education in Iran
- List of Iranian Universities
- Garmsar
