= Abarshiveh Rural District =

Rural district in Tehran province, Iran

Abarshiveh Rural District Persian: دهستان ابرشيوه
- Rural District
- Location within Iran
- Coordinates: 35°35′N 52°21′E
- Country: Iran
- Province: Tehran
- County: Damavand
- District: Central
- Established: 1987
- Capital: Sarbandan

Population (2016)
  - Total: 11,567
- Time zone: UTC+3:30 (IRST)
- Website: abarshive.ir

Abarshiveh Rural District (Persian: دهستان ابرشيوه) is in the Central District of Damavand County, Tehran province, Iran. Its capital is the village of Sarbandan.

== Demographics ==
=== Population ===
At the time of the 2006 National Census, the rural district's population was 10,059 in 2,951 households. There were 11,492 inhabitants in 3,275 households at the following census of 2011. The 2016 census measured the population of the rural district as 11,567 in 3,541 households. The most populous of its 31 villages was Sarbandan, with 3,352 people.

=== All villages in the rural district ===
- Aru
- Ayeneh Varzan
- Darakhtbid
- Dehnar
- Garm Absard
- Havir
- Jaban
- Kahnak
- Kelak
- Khosrovan
- Mashhad-e Firuzkuh
- Moqanak
- Mumej
- Rudafshan
- Saqqez Darreh
- Sarbandan
- Seyyedabad
- Shah Bolaghi
- Sorkheh Deh
- Yadreh
- Yahar
