= Garmsar =

City in Semnan province, Iran

Garmsār Persian: گرمسار
- City
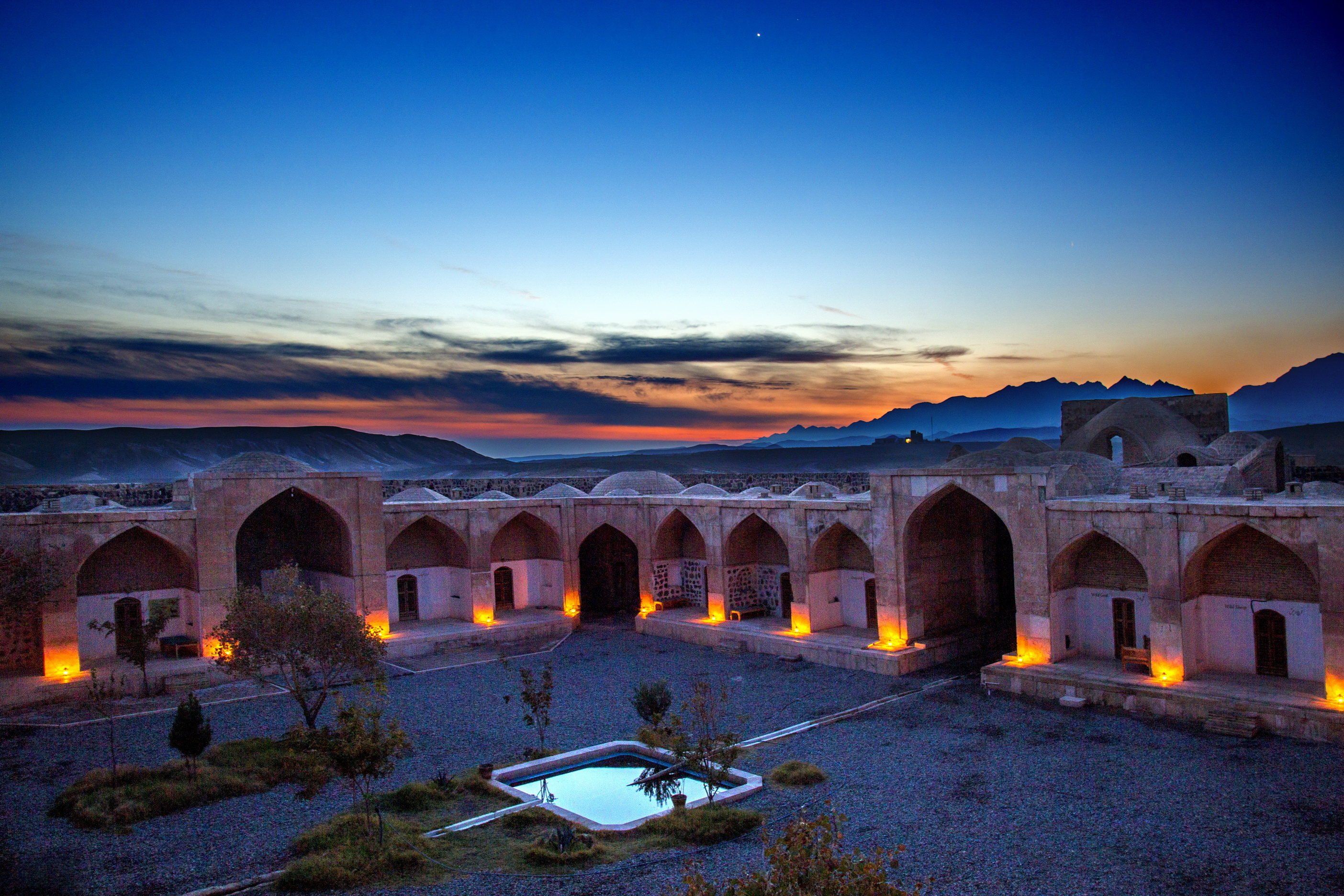
- Bahram Palace

- Location within Iran
- Coordinates: 35°13′14″N 52°20′20″E
- Country: Iran
- Province: Semnan
- County: Garmsar
- District: Central

Population (2016)
  - Total: 48,672
- Time zone: UTC+3:30 (IRST)

Garmsar (Persian: گرمسار, romanized: Garmsār) (Note: Also romanized as Garmsār; formerly Shahr-e Qeshlāq (شَهرِ قِشلاق), also known as Qeshlāq and Qishlaq) is a city in the Central District of Garmsar County, Semnan province, Iran, serving as capital of both the county and the district.

Garmsar is about 95 kilometres (59 mi) southeast of Tehran. It lies on the edge of Dasht-e Kavir, Iran's largest desert. Many people in the city commute to Tehran due to its proximity. Ghasre Bahram, The Stone Way, Stonvand Castle, the Sar Darre Mountains, and Kavir Desert National Park are tourist attractions located in the area.

== Demographics ==
=== Language and ethnicity ===
Garmsar has a Tat majority. Persian and Tati are the main languages in Garmsar County. Other languages such as Azeri and Kurdish are still spoken by older people from different ethnicities like Osanlu(azari) and Pazuki, Gharachorloo and Shadloo (kurdish) in the nearby villages. Younger generation speaks Persian along with their native language.Garmsar has a distinct, native Mazandarani population

=== Population ===
At the time of the 2006 National Census, the city's population was 38,891 in 10,951 households. The following census in 2011 counted 40,985 people in 12,539 households. The 2016 census measured the population of the city as 48,672 people in 16,075 households.

== Climate ==
Garmsar has a hot desert climate (BWh) in Köppen climate classification and (BW) in Trewartha climate classification.

Climate data for Garmsār, Semnan Province, Altitude: 899.9 M from: 1986-2010
Month	Jan	Feb	Mar	Apr	May	Jun	Jul	Aug	Sep	Oct	Nov	Dec	Year
Record high °C (°F)	20.8 (69.4)	24.6 (76.3)	32.2 (90.0)	36.6 (97.9)	40.8 (105.4)	45.0 (113.0)	47.0 (116.6)	46.0 (114.8)	41.0 (105.8)	36.4 (97.5)	28.4 (83.1)	22.2 (72.0)	47.0 (116.6)
Mean daily maximum °C (°F)	10.2 (50.4)	13.5 (56.3)	18.8 (65.8)	25.7 (78.3)	31.6 (88.9)	37.7 (99.9)	40.0 (104.0)	39.1 (102.4)	34.8 (94.6)	27.7 (81.9)	18.9 (66.0)	12.1 (53.8)	25.8 (78.5)
Daily mean °C (°F)	4.7 (40.5)	7.4 (45.3)	12.4 (54.3)	18.6 (65.5)	24.0 (75.2)	29.7 (85.5)	32.4 (90.3)	31.1 (88.0)	26.4 (79.5)	20.0 (68.0)	12.2 (54.0)	6.5 (43.7)	18.8 (65.8)
Mean daily minimum °C (°F)	−0.9 (30.4)	1.3 (34.3)	6.0 (42.8)	11.5 (52.7)	16.4 (61.5)	21.6 (70.9)	24.7 (76.5)	23.2 (73.8)	18.1 (64.6)	12.3 (54.1)	5.6 (42.1)	0.9 (33.6)	11.7 (53.1)
Average precipitation mm (inches)	15.0 (0.59)	14.5 (0.57)	26.9 (1.06)	19.8 (0.78)	10.8 (0.43)	1.0 (0.04)	2.7 (0.11)	1.0 (0.04)	0.4 (0.02)	3.8 (0.15)	11.1 (0.44)	14.1 (0.56)	121.1 (4.79)
Average relative humidity (%)	64	55	47	39	32	23	25	25	28	36	50	64	41

== Agriculture ==
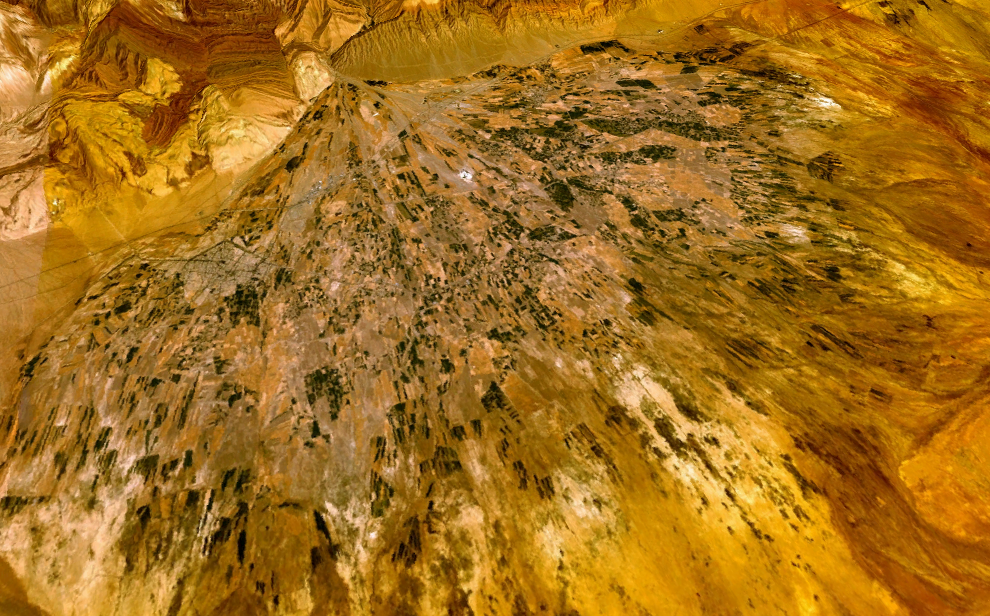
The alluvial fan of Garmsar seen from space

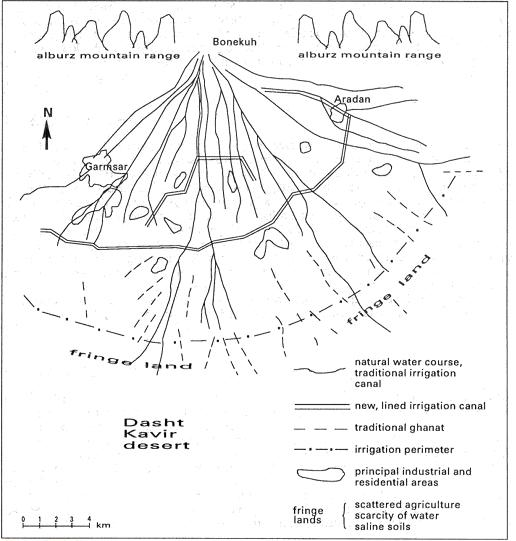
Sketch of the irrigation system in the Garmsar alluvial fan

The Hablehrood river originating from Dalichai-Firouzkooh flows to the plateau of Garmsar. Its water is extensively used for agriculture. Since salt water mixes with Hablehrood before its arrival to the city, the water is not fit for drinking. Hablehrood is the only permanent river in Semnan province. Thanks to the water provided by Hablehrood, people in Garmsar grow wheat, barley, cotton and yellow melon. Garmsar is known across Iran for its sweet and crispy yellow melons.

== Water management ==
The many river branches and the irrigated fields provide recharge to the aquifer. Since ancient times, groundwater in the Garmsar area has been exploited by ghanats (qanats, karezes) and shallow wells, mainly for irrigation of agricultural land, but also for household purposes. In the last decades, the number of deep-wells has increased sharply and the ghanats have fallen dry.

Yet, at the fringes of the fan, problems of waterlogging occur owing to irrigation losses higher up that are transported through the aquifer to the lower lying areas causing shallow watertables, while the evaporation from the shallow watertable brings salts into the rootzone which henceforth is salinizing. As a result, the agriculture in the fringes suffers low yields or is impossible.

Simulation of soil salinity (left) and depth of the watertable (right) in the Garmsar alluvial fan using the spatial agro-hydro-salinity model SahysMod

== Cuisine ==
The city has a regional variant of Tahchin, a dish made by slowly cooking marinated raw meat inside rice over a low flame for several hours.

== Education ==
- Adiban Institute of Higher Education
- Alla ed Dolle Haji Abad, Garmsar
- Amirkabir University of Technology - Garmsar Branch
- Elmi Kaar Bordi, Garmsar
- Islamic Azad University of Garmsar
- Payame Noor University
- University of Garmasar

== Notable people ==
- Amir Arsalan Motahari
- Jalil Zandi
- Ali Sorena
- Mahmoud Ahmadi Nejad

== See also ==
Media related to Garmsar at Wikimedia Commons
