= Adiban Institute of Higher Education =

Institute of higher education in Garmsar, Iran

Coordinates: 35°46′07″N 51°16′45″E

- Type: Private
- Established: 2006
- President: Dr Pourbashash
- Academic staff: ?
- Students: 3000
- Location: Garmsar, Semnan province, Iran
- Campus: countryside
- Athletics: ? teams
- Website: www.adiban.ac.ir

Adiban Institute of Higher Education (Persian: موسسه آموزش عالی ادیبان) is a private institute of higher education located in Garmsar, Iran. The university was established in 2006. It offers undergraduate and graduate degrees in engineering (electrical engineering, computer engineering, and mechanical engineering) and mathematics.

== See also ==
- Higher Education in Iran
- Science and technology in Iran
