= Kilan =

City in Tehran province, Iran

Kilan Persian: کيلان
- City
- Location within Iran
- Coordinates: 35°34′02″N 52°09′03″E
- Country: Iran
- Province: Tehran
- County: Damavand
- District: Central

Government
  - Mayor: Reza Amrallahi
- Elevation: 1,753 m (5,751 ft)

Population (2016)
  - Total: 2,882
- Time zone: UTC+3:30 (IRST)
- Website: shahrdarikilan.ir

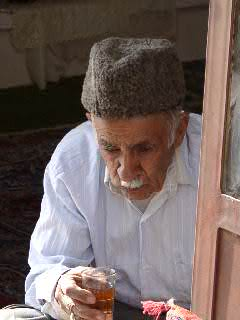
An inhabitant of Kilan

Kilan (Persian: كيلان) (Note: Also romanized as Kailan and Kīlān; also known as Kilun) is a city in the Central District of Damavand County, Tehran province, Iran.

== Demographics ==
=== Population ===
At the time of the 2006 National Census, the city's population was 3,038 in 913 households. The following census in 2011 counted 2,981 people in 902 households. The 2016 census measured the population of the city as 2,882 people in 927 households.

== Overview ==
The name is derived from the Tati tribe of Kailan/Khailan/Gailan who were settled in this region during the Tati period. Only a few still speak Tati language (Iran). The local folklore, however, produces a folk etymology for the now mysterious name as meaning "king's place."

The earliest human settlement near Kilan is the Neolithic site of Qaleh Asgar located about 1.2 km southeast of Kilan. The site was excavated by Enayatolah Amirlou, who assigned it to the Epipaleolithic period. A reexamination of archaeological finds by Fereidoun Biglari showed that the site is Neolithic and dates back to about 8000 years ago.

75% of the inhabitants of the city have academic degrees.

== See also ==
Media related to Kilan at Wikimedia Commons
