= Hamand, Nehbandan =

Hamand همند
- Village
- Location within Iran
- Coordinates: 31°46′12″N 60°00′49″E
- Country: Iran
- Province: South Khorasan
- County: Nehbandan
- Bakhsh: Shusef
- Rural District: Shusef

Population (2006)
  - Total: 111
- Time zone: UTC+3:30 (IRST)
  - Summer (DST): UTC+4:30 (IRDT)

Hamand (Persian: همند, also Romanized as Homand) is a village in Shusef Rural District, Shusef District, Nehbandan County, South Khorasan Province, Iran. At the 2006 census, its population was 111, in 35 families.
