= Havir, Khuzestan =

Havir حوير
- Village
- Location within Iran
- Coordinates: 31°21′16″N 49°20′05″E
- Country: Iran
- Province: Khuzestan
- County: Ramhormoz
- Bakhsh: Central
- Rural District: Howmeh-ye Gharbi

Population (2006)
  - Total: 204
- Time zone: UTC+3:30 (IRST)
  - Summer (DST): UTC+4:30 (IRDT)

Havir (Persian: حوير, also Romanized as Ḩavīr and Ḩoveyr; also known as Havair and Huvīr) is a village in Howmeh-ye Gharbi Rural District, in the Central District of Ramhormoz County, Khuzestan Province, Iran. At the 2006 census, its population was 204, in 37 families.
