= Hamand, Khusf =

Hamand همند
- Village
- Location within Iran
- Coordinates: 32°28′15″N 58°52′04″E
- Country: Iran
- Province: South Khorasan
- County: Khusf
- Bakhsh: Central District
- Rural District: Khusf

Population (2006)
  - Total: 225
- Time zone: UTC+3:30 (IRST)
  - Summer (DST): UTC+4:30 (IRDT)

Hamand (Persian: همند, also Romanized as Hamond, Hamund, and Homand; also known as Hāmūn) is a village in Khusf Rural District, Central District, Khusf County, South Khorasan Province, Iran. At the 2006 census, its population was 225, in 71 families.
