= Absard =

City in Tehran province, Iran

Absard Persian: آبسرد
- City
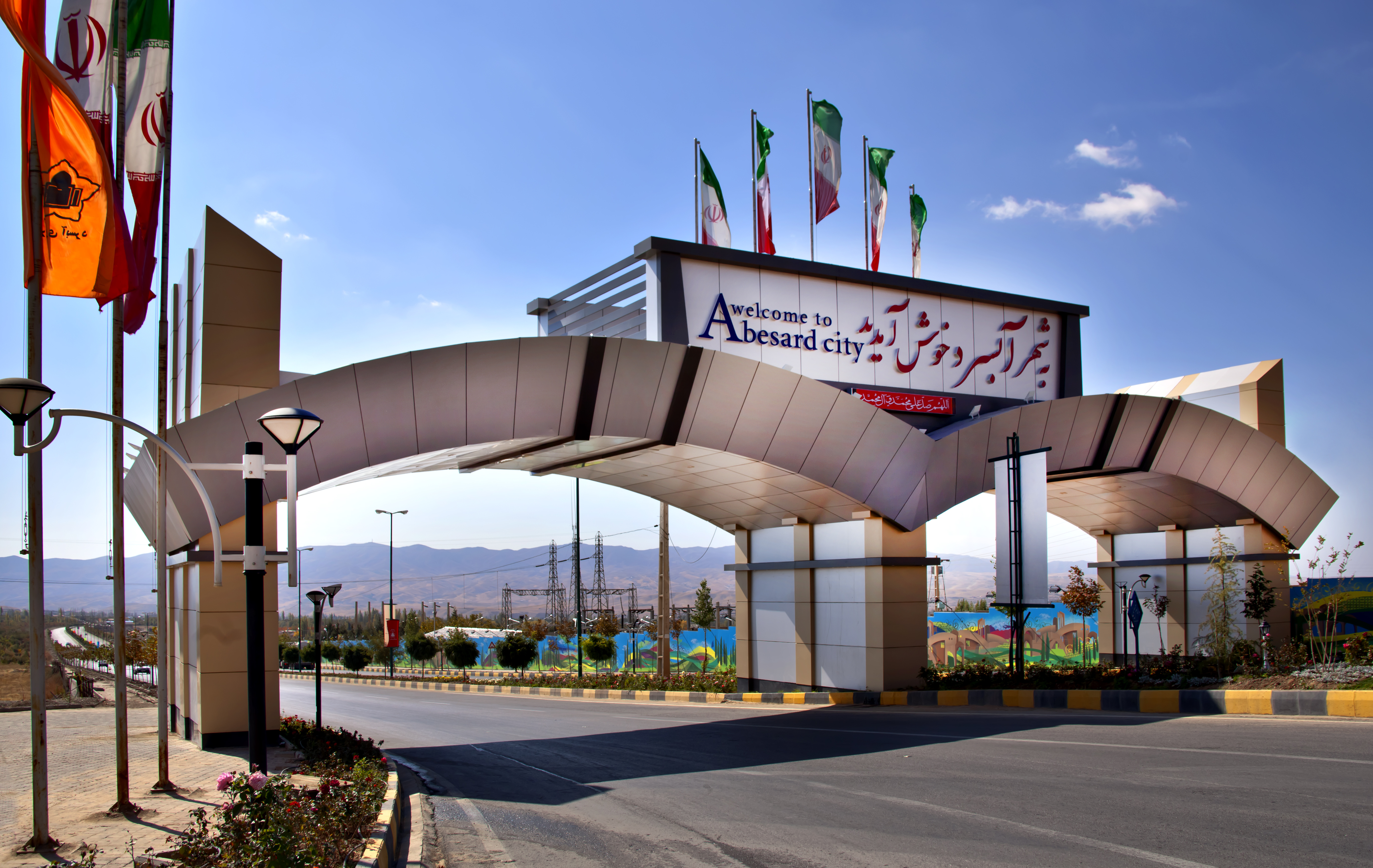

- Location within Iran
- Coordinates: 35°37′10″N 52°09′07″E
- Country: Iran
- Province: Tehran
- County: Damavand
- District: Central
- Established as a city: 1996
- Elevation: 1,700–2,000 m (5,600–6,600 ft)

Population (2016)
  - Total: 10,648
- Time zone: UTC+3:30 (IRST)

Absard (Persian: آبسرد) (Note: Also romanized as Āb Sard and Ābsard (English: Cold Water)) is a city in the Central District of Damavand County, Tehran province, Iran, serving as the administrative center for Jamabrud Rural District. The village of Absard merged with the villages of Maranak (مرانک) and Taskin (تاسکین) in 1996 to become the city of Absard.

== Demographics ==
=== Population ===
At the time of the 2006 National Census, the city's population was 9,865 in 2,438 households. The following census in 2011 counted 9,202 people in 2,441 households. The 2016 census measured the population of the city as 10,648 people in 3,110 households.

== Geography ==
=== Location ===
Absard is situated around 70 km east of Tehran, in the province of the same name. Its center is to be found a few km south of the Firuz Kuh road (N79).

The area between the highway and the centre is popular as a second residence for Tehranis and others. The area around Absard is filled with vacation villas for the Iranian elite. Small-scale garden irrigation makes the area very green among yellowish hills and mountains culminating above 3500m (Khaki, خاکی, and the Zarrin range) in the north.

=== Climate ===
The minimum and maximum temperature was −24 °C in January–February and 37 °C in July–August. Average rainfall of a year was 333 mm and of first 3 months of year (development and flowering stage of plants) were 13 and 130 mm in 2008 and 2009, respectively.

== Agriculture ==
Apples, cherries sweet and sour, apricots, pears and walnuts are among the many produces growing in the many orchards peppering the area.

== See also ==
Media related to Absard at Wikimedia Commons
