= Central District (Damavand County) =

District in Tehran province, Iran

Central District (Damavand County) Persian: بخش مرکزی شهرستان دماوند
- District
- Location within Iran
- Coordinates: 35°34′52″N 52°10′53″E
- Country: Iran
- Province: Tehran
- County: Damavand
- Established: County)
- Capital: Damavand

Population (2016)
  - Total: 84,375
- Time zone: UTC+3:30 (IRST)
- Website: www.damavand.gov.ir

The Central District of Damavand County (Persian: بخش مرکزی شهرستان دماوند) is in Tehran province, Iran. Its capital is the city of Damavand.

== History ==
The district was established in 1938 as Damavand District, a part of Tehran County. Its name was automatically changed to the Central District 1946 when it became independent from the county.

== Demographics ==
=== Population ===
At the time of the 2006 National Census, the district's population was 69,829 in 19,643 households. The following census in 2011 counted 71,359 people in 21,158 households. The 2016 census measured the population of the district as 84,375 inhabitants in 26,337 households.

=== Administrative divisions ===
Central District (Damavand County) Population
Administrative Divisions	2006	2011	2016
Abarshiveh RD	10,059	11,492	11,567
Jamabrud RD	4,773	4,878	4,635
Tarrud RD	5,661	5,491	6,263
Absard (city)	9,865	9,202	10,648
Damavand (city)	36,433	37,315	48,380
Kilan (city)	3,038	2,981	2,882
Total	69,829	71,359	84,375
RD = Rural District
