= Damavand County =

County in Tehran province, Iran

Damavand County Persian: شهرستان دماوند
- County
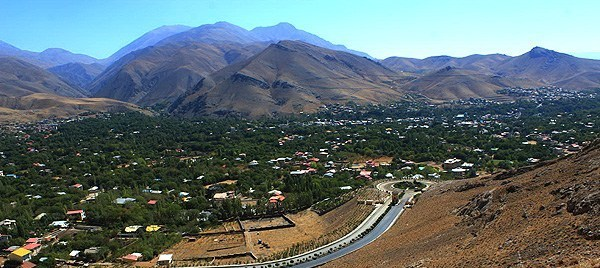
- The city of Damavand

- Location of Damavand County in Tehran province (right, pink)

- Location of Tehran province in Iran
- Coordinates: 35°38′N 52°13′E
- Country: Iran
- Province: Tehran
- Capital: Damavand
- Districts: Central, Rudehen
- Elevation: 2,000 m (6,600 ft)

Population (2016)
  - Total: 125,480
- Time zone: UTC+3:30 (IRST)

Damavand County (Persian: شهرستان دماوند) is in Tehran province, Iran. The capital of the county is the city of Damavand.

== Demographics ==
=== Population ===
At the time of the 2006 National Census, the county's population was 96,860 in 27,419 households. The following census in 2011 counted 100,690 people in 30,060 households. The 2016 census measured the population of the county as 125,480 in 39,373 households.

According to the information of the State Meteorological Organization of Iran, the long-term average annual rainfall of Damavand is around 377.6 mm.

=== Administrative divisions ===
Damavand County's population history and administrative structure over three consecutive censuses are shown in the following table.

Damavand County Population
Administrative Divisions	2006	2011	2016
Central District	69,829	71,359	84,375
Abarshiveh RD	10,059	11,492	11,567
Jamabrud RD	4,773	4,878	4,635
Tarrud RD	5,661	5,491	6,263
Absard (city)	9,865	9,202	10,648
Damavand (city)	36,433	37,315	48,380
Kilan (city)	3,038	2,981	2,882
Rudehen District	27,031	29,330	41,104
Abali RD	2,047	2,537	2,902
Mehrabad RD	2,842	2,794	6,911
Abali (city)	2,607	2,522	2,758
Rudehen (city)	19,535	21,477	28,533
Total	96,860	100,690	125,480
RD = Rural District

== See also ==
Media related to Damavand County at Wikimedia Commons
