= Tehran province =

Province of Iran

Tehran province استان تهران (Persian)
- Province
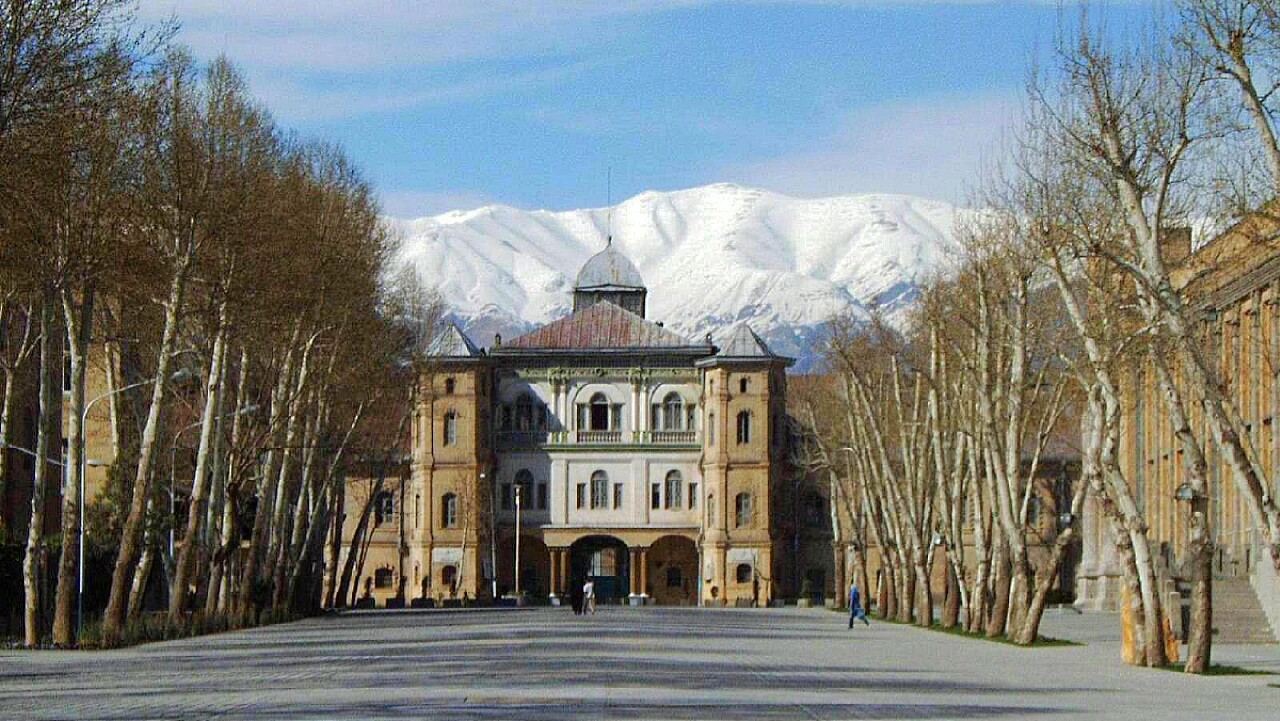
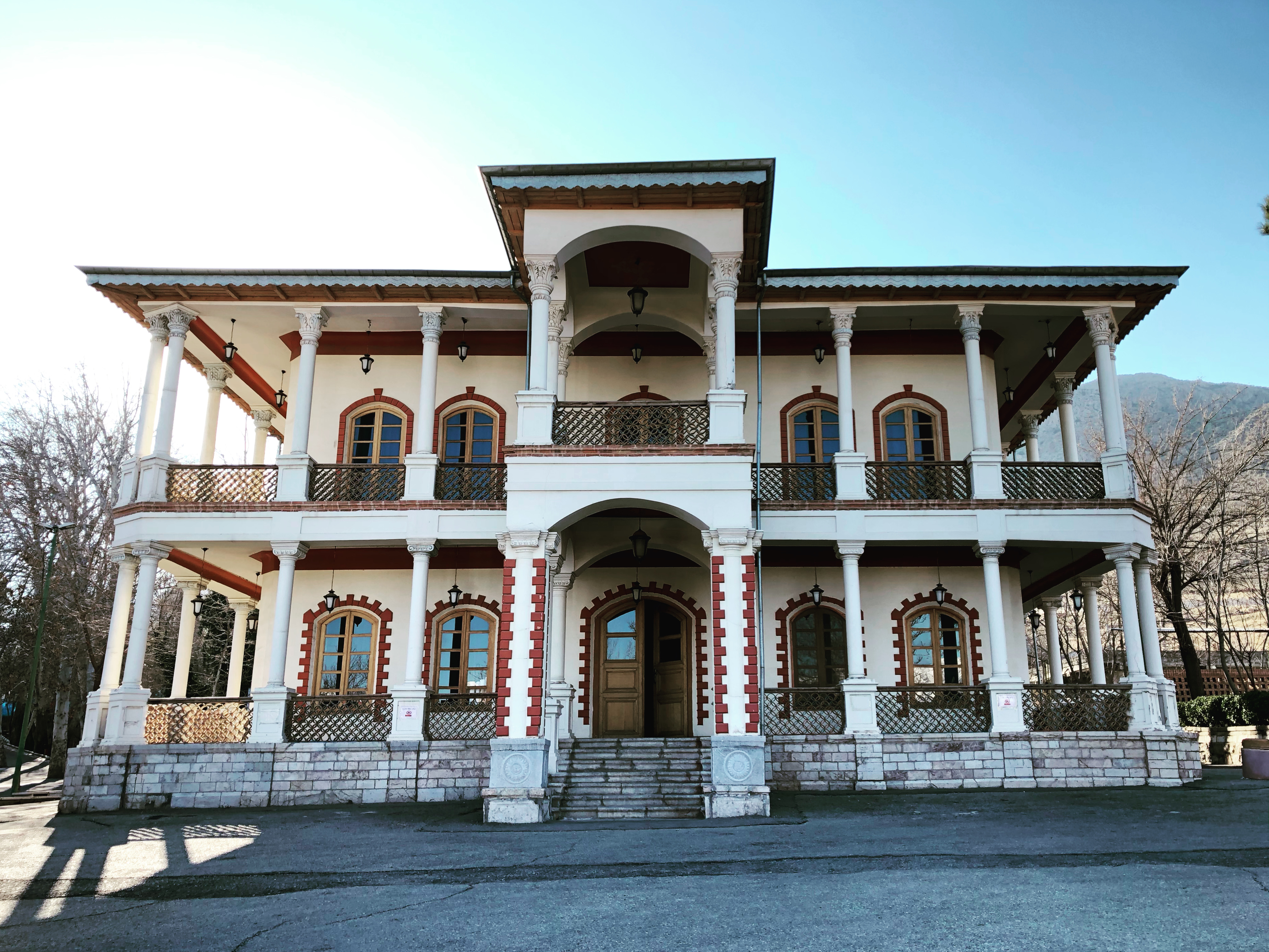
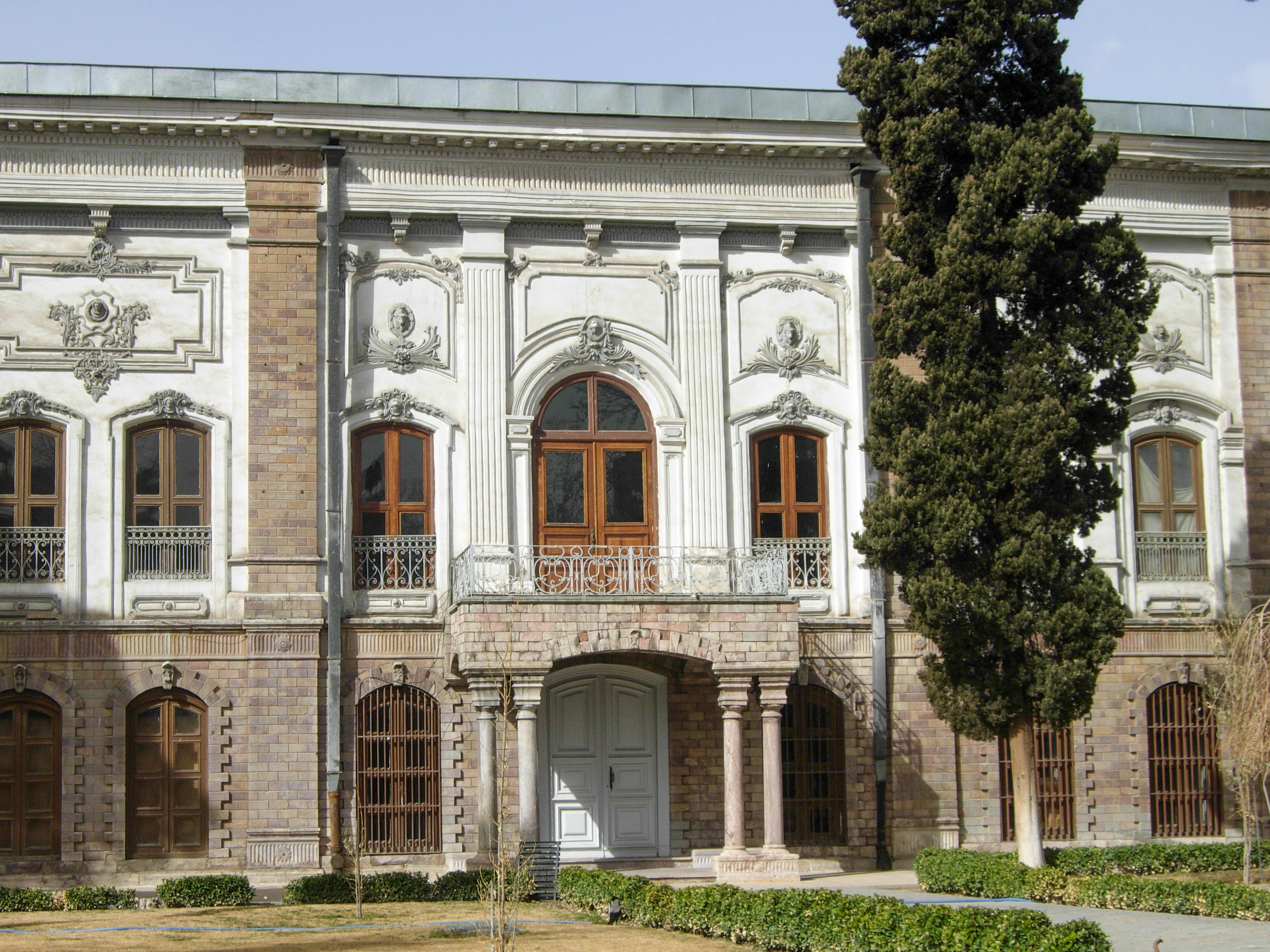
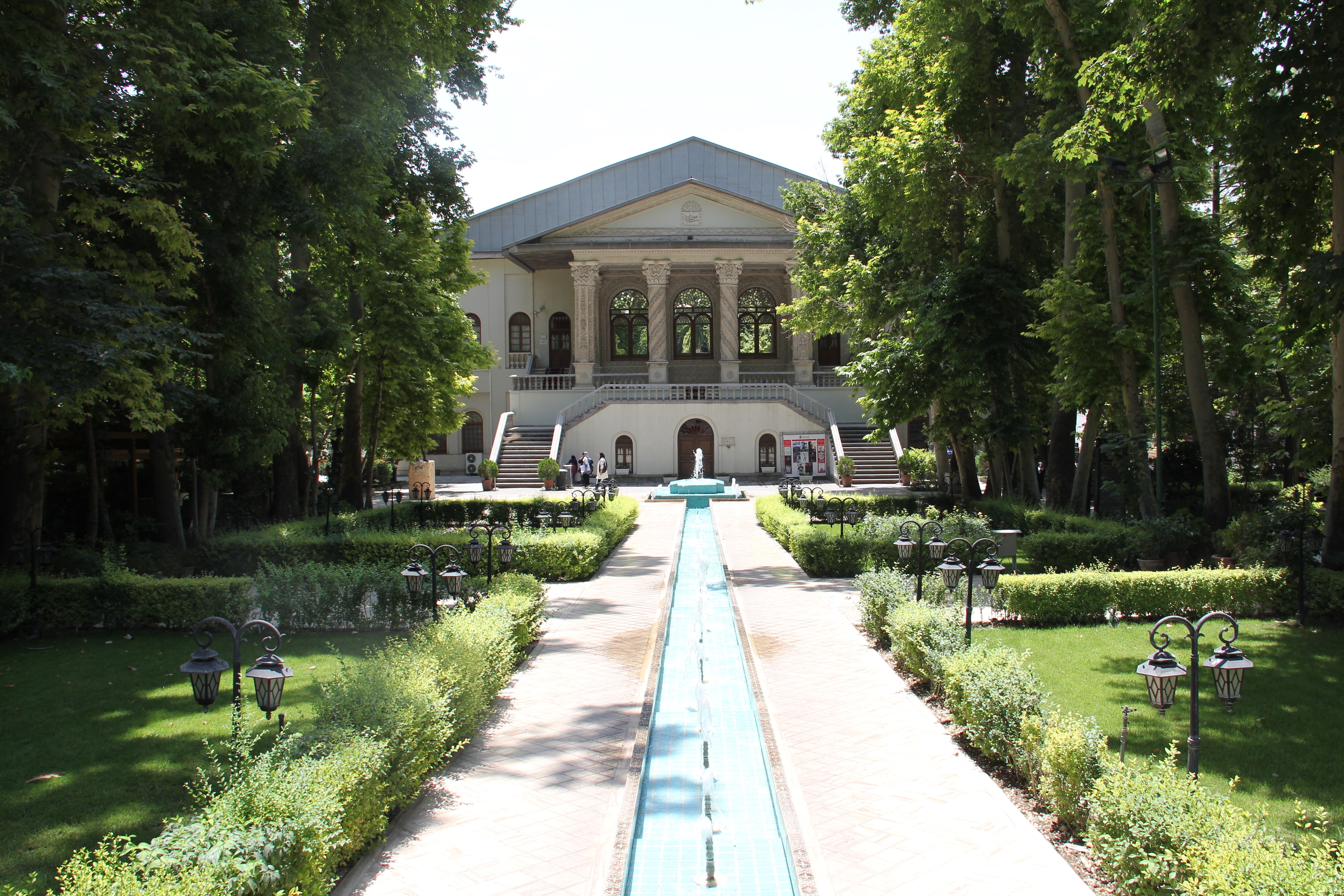
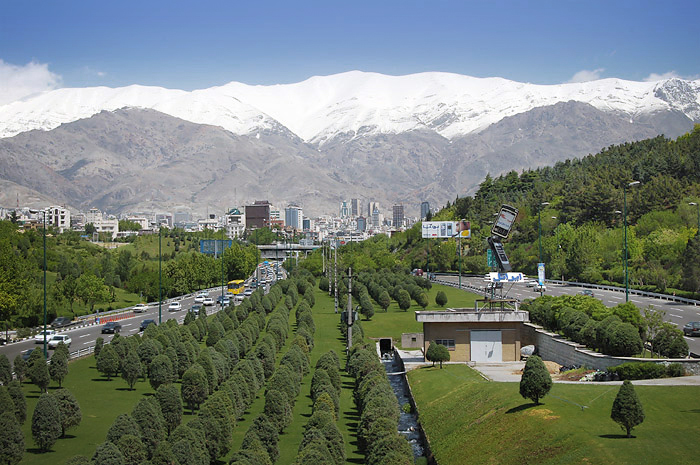
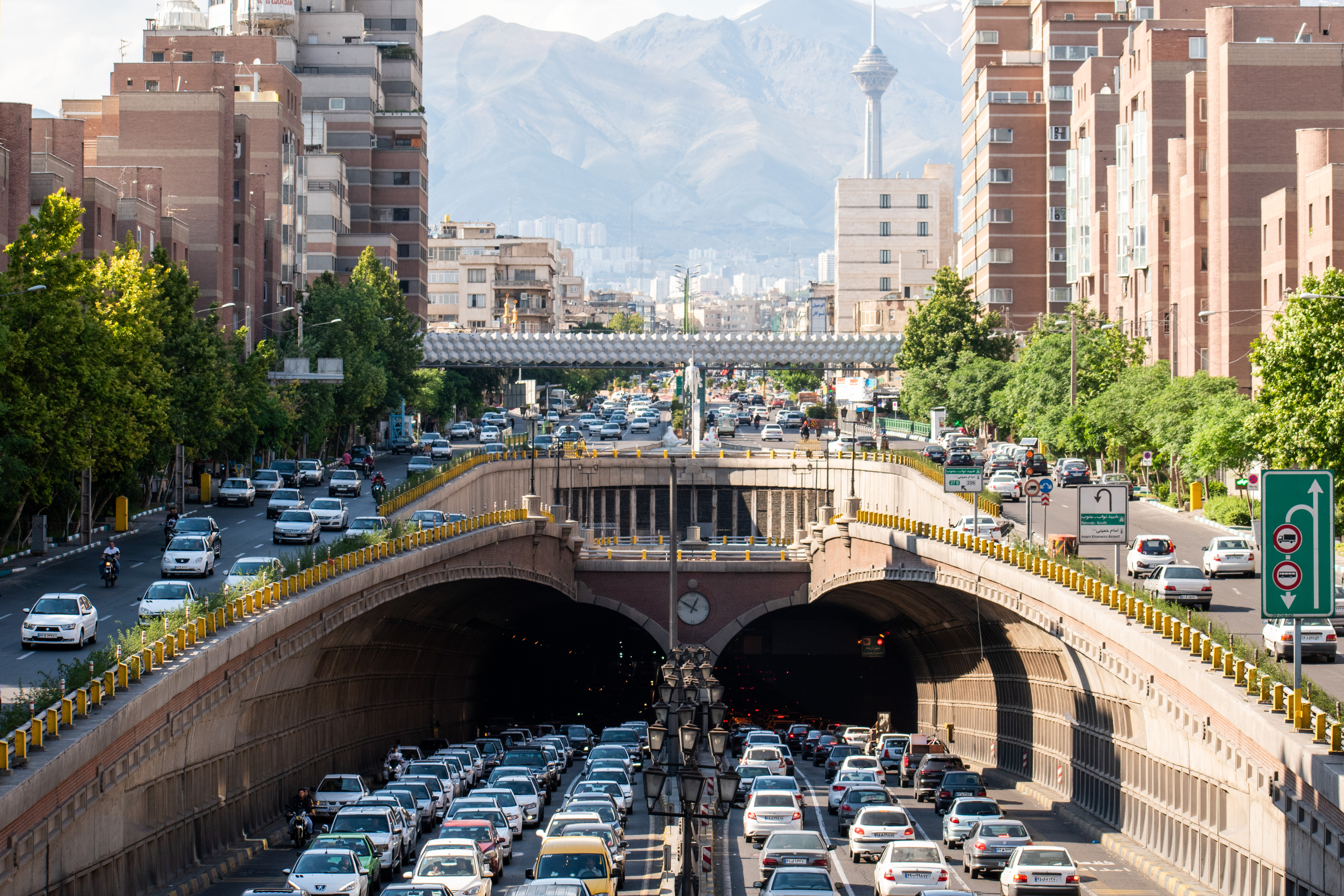

- Counties of Tehran province

- Location of Tehran province within Iran
- Coordinates: 35°32′N 51°31′E
- Country: Iran
- Region: Region 1
- Capital: Tehran
- Counties: 16

Government
  - Governor-general: Mohammad-Sadegh Motamedian (Independent)

Area
  - Total: 18,814 km^{2} (7,264 sq mi)

Population (2016)
  - Total: 13,267,637
  - Estimate (2020): 13,973,000
  - Rank: 1st
  - Density: 705.20/km^{2} (1,826.5/sq mi)
- Time zone: UTC+03:30 (IRST)
- Area code: 021
- ISO 3166 code: IR-23
- Main language(s): Persian
- HDI (2018): 0.834 very high · 1st

Tehran province (Persian: استان تهران, romanized: Ostān-e Tehrān) is one of the 31 provinces of Iran. Its capital is the city of Tehran, the national capital of Iran.

Tehran Province covers an area of 18,814 square kilometres (7,264 sq mi) and is located to the north of the Central Plateau of Iran. It was made a part of the First Region with its secretariat located in Tehran, upon the division of the provinces into 5 regions, solely for coordination and development purposes on June 22, 2014.

Tehran Province is situated in north-central Iran, lying on the southern slopes of the Alborz Mountains. The province’s location within the Alborz range gives it a diverse topography, with high mountains in the north and gradually descending plains toward the south. This geographical setting creates a varied climate, from cool alpine conditions to semi-arid lowlands.

The province of Tehran has over 12 million inhabitants and is Iran's most densely populated region. Approximately 86.5 percent reside in urban areas and 13.5 percent in rural areas of the province.

== History ==
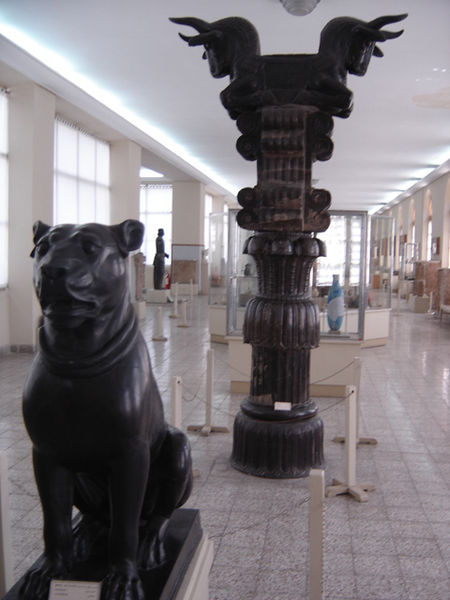
The Achaemenid collection of the National Museum of Iran in Tehran

Tehran province has several archaeological sites indicating settlements dating back several thousand years. Until 300 years ago, Rey was the most prominent of the cities of the province. However, the city of Tehran rose to become the largest city and capital of Iran by 1796, and since then has been the political, cultural, economic, and commercial nucleus of Iran.

Tehran has over 1,500 historical sites of cultural significance registered with the Cultural Heritage Organization of Iran. The oldest of these in Tehran Province is the remains of two sites in Firuzkuh County that date back to the fourth millennium BCE.

After the 2006 census, Karaj, Nazarabad, and Savojbolagh Counties were separated from the province in the establishment of Alborz province.

=== Tehran province today ===
Tehran is the commercial heart of Iran. Tehran Province has over 17,000 industrial units employing 390,000 people, 26% of all units in Iran. The province contains 30% of Iran's economy, and comprises 40% of Iran's consumer market. The province has three hydrodams (Latiyan, Lar, and Amir Kabir)as well as two natural lakes, providing the water supply of Tehran and the province.

The province contains 170 mines, over 330 square kilometres of forests, and over 12800 square kilometres of pasture.

Generally speaking, year round, regions such as the southern slopes of the Alborz Mountains, especially in the mountains, valleys, and rivers and artificial lakes formed behind the great dams of Amir Kabir, Latiyan and Lar along with natural lakes of Jaban and Tarr provide considerable recreation for the province.

Moreover, due to excessive snowfall in the northern areas of the province during the winter season, the Alborz mountains form an excellent environment for winter sports such as skiing. Dizin, Shemshak, and Tochal are the most popular skiing resorts.

== Geography ==
Tehran province borders Mazandaran Province in the north, Qom Province in the south, Semnan Province in the east, Alborz Province in the west and Markazi Province in the southwest. The metropolis of Tehran is the capital city of the province and of Iran.

Tehran province is the richest in Iran, as it contributes approximately 29% of the country's gross domestic product (GDP). Furthermore, it houses approximately 18% of the country's population and is the most industrialized province in Iran, with nearly 94% of its residents living in the cities as of 2016.

The province gained importance when Tehran was proclaimed the capital by the Qajar dynasty in 1778. Today, Tehran, with a population of 8 million, is ranked amongst the 40 most populous metropolitan cities of the world.

The largest rivers of this province are Karaj River and Jajrood River.

Mountain ranges such as The Alborz span the north; Savad Kooh and Firooz Kooh are located in the northeast; Lavasanat, Qarah Daq, Shemiranat, Hassan Abad and Namak Mountains are in the southern areas; Bibi Shahr Banoo and Alqadr are situated in the southeast and the heights of Qasr-e-Firoozeh been located to the east of the province.

Environmentally, the climate of Tehran province is stable and has four seasons, in winter its experiences cold and snowy conditions, in spring and autumn it experiences generally mild conditions with ample rain, and in summer it experiences warm to hot conditions, and is generally dry. In the mountains, however, it is cold and semi-humid all year round, and the higher regions are colder with long winters. The hottest months of the year are from mid-July to mid-September when temperatures range from 28 °C (82 °F) to 30 °C (86 °F) and the coldest months experience 1 °C (34 °F) around January–February, but at certain times in winter it can reach −20 °C (−4 °F). Tehran city has cold winters and warm to hot summers. Average annual rainfall is approximately 200 millimetres (7.9 in), the maximum being during the winter season mostly in the form of snow. On the whole, the province has a cold semi-arid, steppe climate in the south and an alpine climate in the north.

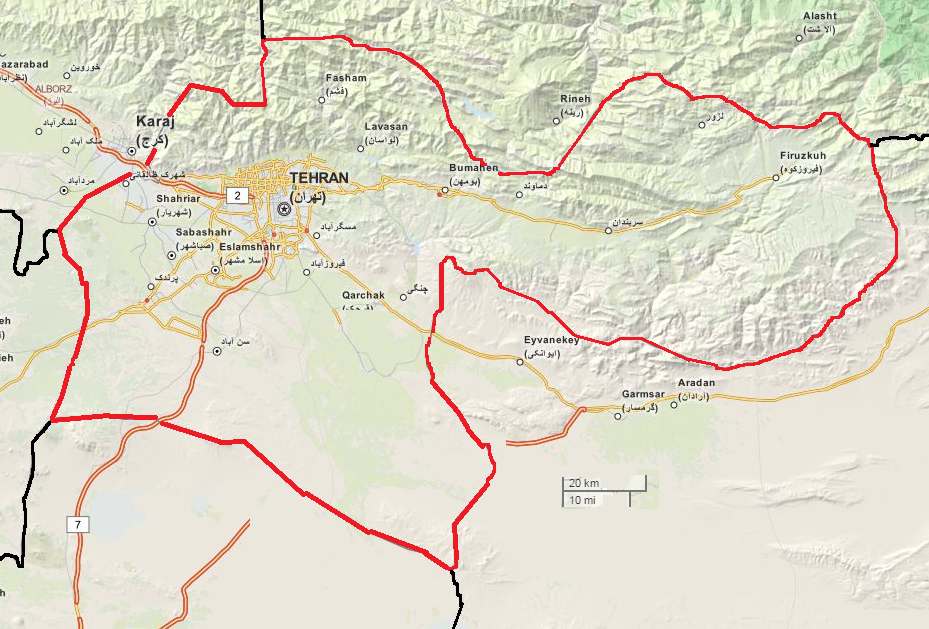
Tehran Province map

== Demographics ==
=== Ethnicity ===
==== Persians ====
The majority of people living in Tehran province are ethnically Persian, and Tehran is the largest Persian-speaking city in the world.

==== Armenians ====
A population of Armenians mainly lives in the eastern areas of Tehran.

==== Azerbaijanis ====
Azerbaijanis are one of the Iranian ethnic groups living in Tehran province, who also form the largest group of immigrants in Tehran province. Azeris in Tehran speak the Azeri and Persian languages.

==== Gilaks ====
A population of Gilaks also live in Tehran and speak the Gilaki and Persian languages.

==== Kurds ====
Many Kurds have migrated to Tehran province in recent years to continue their studies or to find jobs. Also, the people of Sarbandan, Jaban, Sorkheh Deh and Khosrovan districts of Damavand county in the east of Tehran province speak Kurmanji Kurdish language. The people of these areas are Kurmanji Kurds who moved to this area from Khorasan during the Qajar period. Simultaneously with the migration of Kurmanji tribes from Khorasan to Damavand, another group of Kurds from Khorasan migrated from Dargaz to Piranshahr, one of the cities of Kurdistan south of Lake Urmia.

==== Lurs ====
Many Lurs migrate to Tehran province every year, and in this way, Tehran has a minority of Lurs. Also, Hadavand clan is one of the oldest and largest clans of Tehran province, which moved to Tehran province during the time of Karim Khan Zand.

==== Mazanderanis ====
Mazanderanis are the third largest tribe of Tehran province, who mostly migrated to Tehran from the cities of Babol, Sari, Amol, Qaemshahr and Savadkuh. In addition to Tehran city, Mazanderani language is also spoken in Firuzkuh, Damavand and Shemiranat cities.

=== Population ===
At the time of the 2006 National Census, the province's population was 13,281,858 in 3,729,010 households. The following census in 2011 counted 12,183,391 people in 3,731,480 households. The 2016 census measured the population of the province as 13,267,637 in 4,288,563 households.

=== Administrative divisions ===

The population history and structural changes of Tehran province's administrative divisions over three consecutive censuses are shown in the following table.

Tehran Province
Counties	2006	2011	2016
Baharestan (Note: Separated from Robat Karim County after the 2006 census)	—	523,636	536,329
Damavand	96,860	100,690	125,480
Eslamshahr	447,192	485,688	548,620
Firuzkuh	37,416	38,712	33,558
Karaj (Note: Transferred to Alborz province after the 2006 census)	1,709,481	—	—
Malard (Note: Separated from Shahriar County after the 2006 census)	—	373,994	377,292
Nazarabad	128,666	—	—
Pakdasht	240,841	291,397	350,966
Pardis (Note: Separated from Tehran County after the 2011 census)	—	—	169,060
Pishva (Note: Separated from Varamin County after the 2006 census)	—	75,454	86,601
Qarchak (Note: Separated from Varamin County after the 2011 census)	—	—	269,138
Qods (Note: Separated from Shahriar County after the 2006 census)	—	290,663	316,636
Ray	292,016	319,305	349,700
Robat Karim	608,530	195,917	291,516
Savojbolagh	215,086	—	—
Shahriar	1,044,707	624,440	744,210
Shemiranat	37,778	44,061	47,279
Tehran	7,882,843	8,293,140	8,737,510
Varamin	540,442	526,294	283,742
Total	13,281,858	12,183,391	13,267,637

=== Cities ===
According to the 2016 census, 12,452,230 people (nearly 94% of the population of Tehran province) live in the following cities:

City	Population
Abali	2,758
Absard	10,648
Ahmadabad-e Mostowfi	14,077
Andisheh	116,062
Arjomand	1,124
Baghestan	83,934
Baqershahr	65,388
Bumahen	79,034
Chahardangeh	49,950
Damavand	48,380
Eslamshahr	448,129
Fasham	6,945
Ferdowsiyeh	34,221
Ferunabad	21,682
Firuzkuh	17,453
Golestan	239,556
Hasanabad	43,922
Javadabad	4,844
Kahrizak	37,527
Kilan	2,882
Lavasan	18,146
Malard	281,027
Nasimshahr	200,393
Nasirshahr	28,644
Pakdasht	236,319
Parand	97,464
Pardis	73,363
Pishva	59,184
Qarchak	231,075
Qods	309,605
Robat Karim	105,393
Rudehen	28,533
Sabashahr	53,971
Safadasht	32,476
Salehabad	58,683
Shahedshahr	25,544
Shahriar	309,607
Sharifabad	18,281
Shemshak	3,423
Tehran	8,693,706
Vahidiyeh	33,249
Varamin	225,628

The following table shows the ten largest cities of Tehran province:

Rank	Name	County	2016
1	Tehran	Tehran	8,693,706
2	Eslamshahr	Eslamshahr	448,129
3	Shahriar	Shahriar	309,607
4	Qods	Qods	309,605
5	Malard	Malard	281,027
6	Golestan	Baharestan	239,556
7	Pakdasht	Pakdasht	236,319
8	Qarchak	Qarchak	231,075
9	Varamin	Varamin	225,628
10	Nasimshahr	Baharestan	200,393

=== Anthropology ===
Tehran Province is the most populous province of Iran. The population density in this province is 969 people per square kilometer. During a research that was commissioned by the General Culture Council in 2009 and based on a field survey and a statistical community among the residents of 288 cities and about 1400 villages across the country, the percentage of ethnic groups that were sampled in this survey in this province was as follows. Persians was 56.9%, Azari 56.9%, Northern (Mazani, Gilak and Talish) 30.3%, Kurdish 5.5%, Lurs 2.8%, Baloch 2.1%.

== Transportation ==
=== Road transport ===
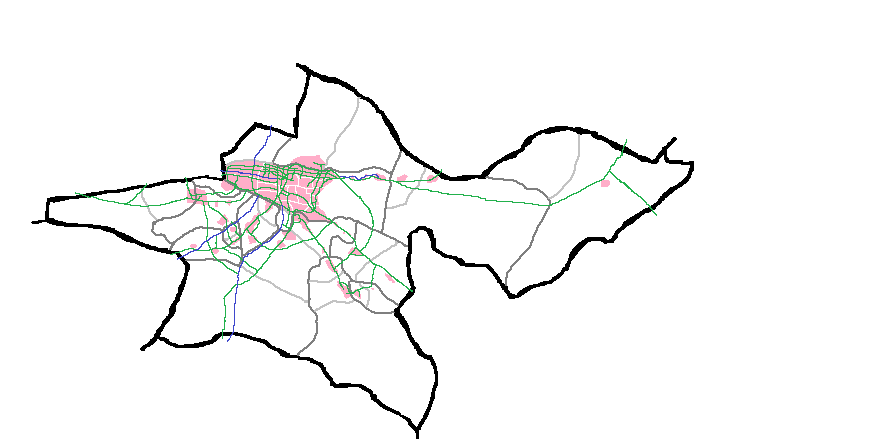
Freeways (in blue) and main roads (in green) in Tehran province

Tehran province is served by a large freeway and expressway network:

- Freeway 2 (Tehran–Karaj Freeway): This freeway connects Tehran to the capital city of neighboring province of Alborz, Karaj and continues towards Tabriz and Europe.
- Freeway 5 (Tehran–Saveh Freeway): This Freeway connects city of Tehran to its southern suburbs such as Sabashahr, Robat Karim and Parand and continues towards Markazi province to Saveh and Salafchegan. There are plans to continue the freeway towards Khuzestan.
- Freeway 7 (Tehran–Qom Freeway/Khalij-e-Fars (Persian Gulf) Freeway): This Freeway connects Tehran City to its airport, Imam Khomeini International Airport and continues towards Qom and Isfahan.
- Tehran–Pardis Freeway: This freeway connects Tehran City to its northeastern suburbs such as Pardis, Bumehen and Rudehen and joins Haraz Road and Firuzkuh Road.
- Tehran–Shomal Freeway: This under construction freeway will connect Tehran to Chalus and the touristic areas in Shomal.
- Makhsus Road: This road is the old road from Tehran to Karaj. Because trucks are not allowed on the freeway this road has a high congestion of trucks.
- Road 38: This road connects Tehran to Shahriar and Malard in southwestern Tehran and continues towards Buin-Zahra in Qazvin province.
- Road 44: This Expressway connects Tehran to Mashhad.
- Road 65 (Saidi Expressway/Saveh Road): This road connects Tehran to its southern suburbs such as Chahardangeh, Eslamshahr and Golestan. It continues towards Saveh and further south towards Isfahan, Abadeh, Shiraz and finally the Persian Gulf coastal industrial city of Asaluyeh.
- Road 71 (Qom old Road): This road is the road that connected Tehran to Qom as a main road before the opening of the freeway in 1980. It is still an important transit road because trucks are not allowed in the freeway.
- (Damavand Road/Haraz Road): This road connects Tehran to cities like Rudehen, Abali and Damavand and continues towards Amol in Mazandaran province in Shomal. It is the most congested road from Tehran to Shomal after Chalous Road.
- Road 79 (Firuzkuh Road): This road connects Tehran to Firuzkuh and Qaemshahr and therefore Sari.
- Greater Tehran Expressway Network:

=== Rail network ===
==== National Rail Network ====
The city of Tehran is connected to the North, South, West and East with the railway. It has weekly trains for Istanbul. Tehran is the headquarters of RAJA (Iran national railway). There may be plans to build high speed railway lines from Tehran to Mashhad and Isfahan.

==== Tehran Metro ====
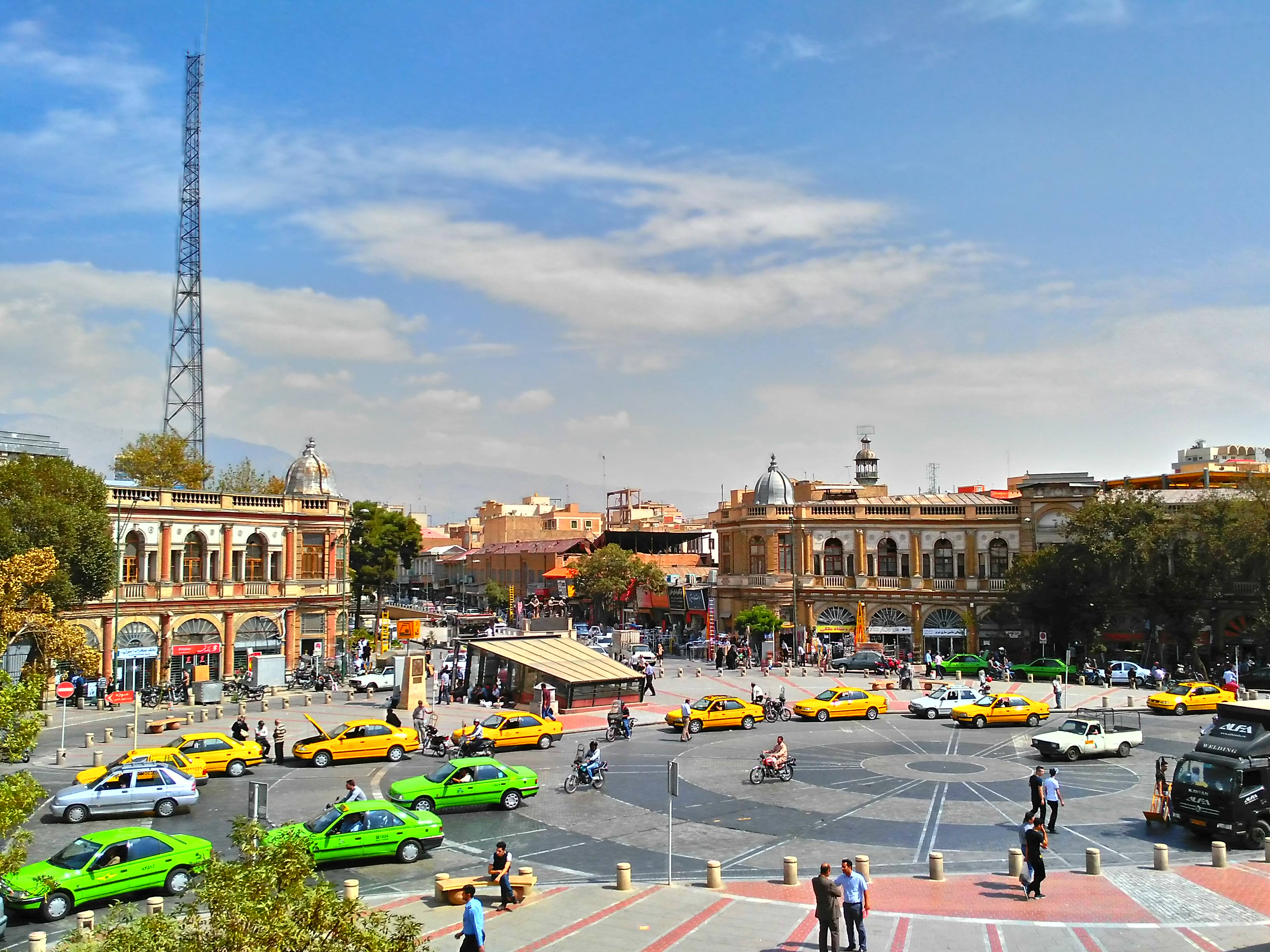
Hassan Abad Sq. Metro station

Tehran is served by a system of metro of three urban lines (1, 2, 4) and one suburban line (5) serving Karaj and Tehran western suburbs. There are plans to extend the system to eight urban lines and express express suburban lines.

=== Airports ===
Tehran province has two main passenger airports:

- Mehrabad Airport
- Imam Khomeini Airport

It also has a number of air force bases.

== Parks, recreation and other attractions ==
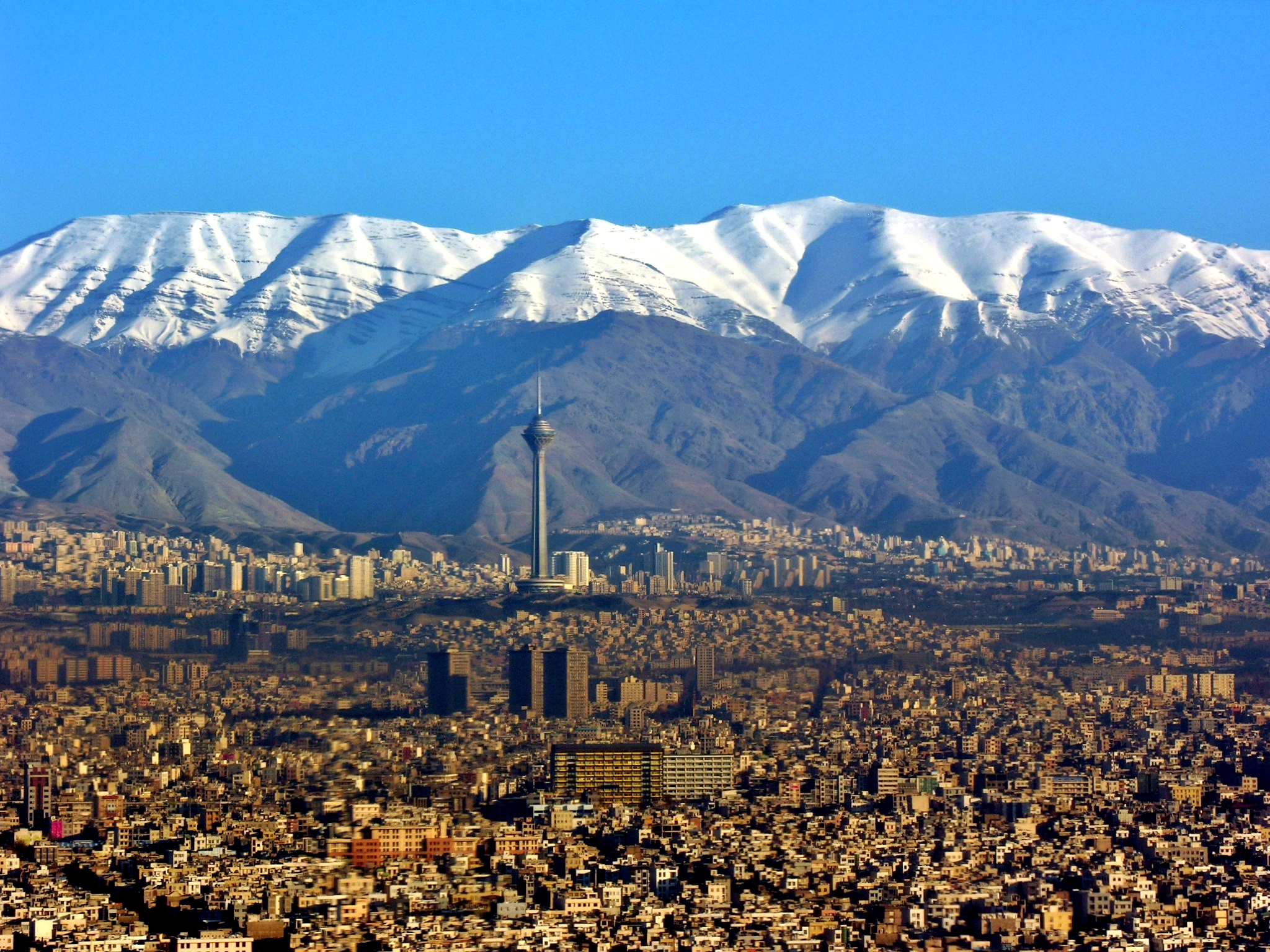
A view of Tehran and Alborz Mountains

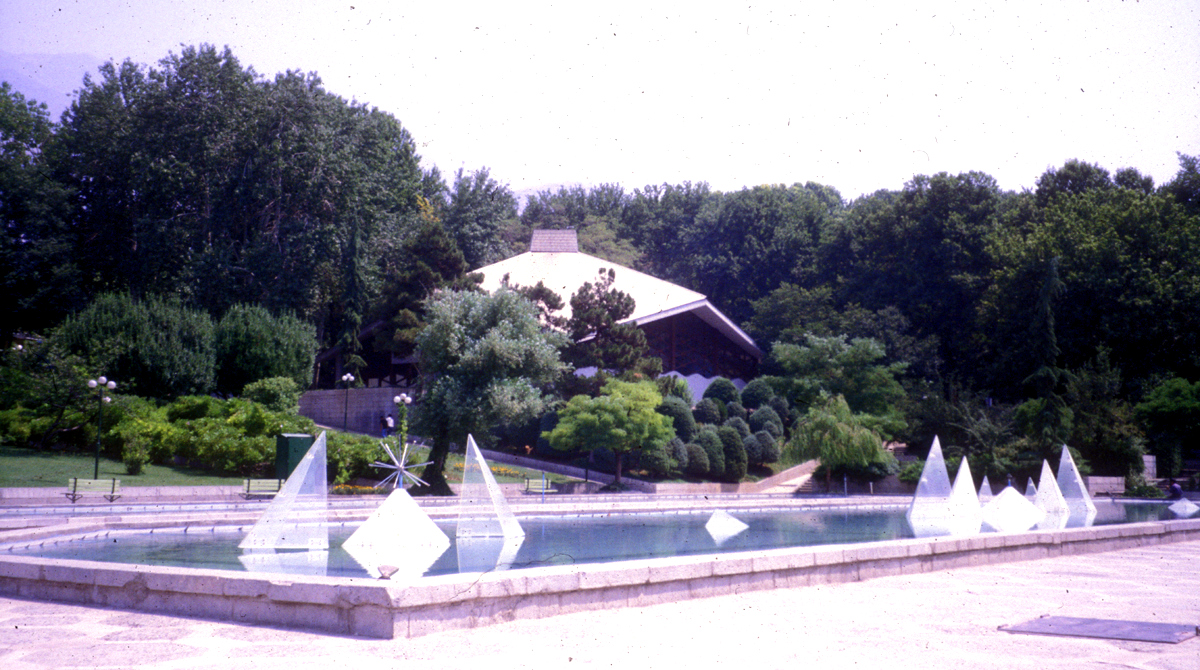
The Niavaran Public Library is nestled snugly within the Niavaran city park.

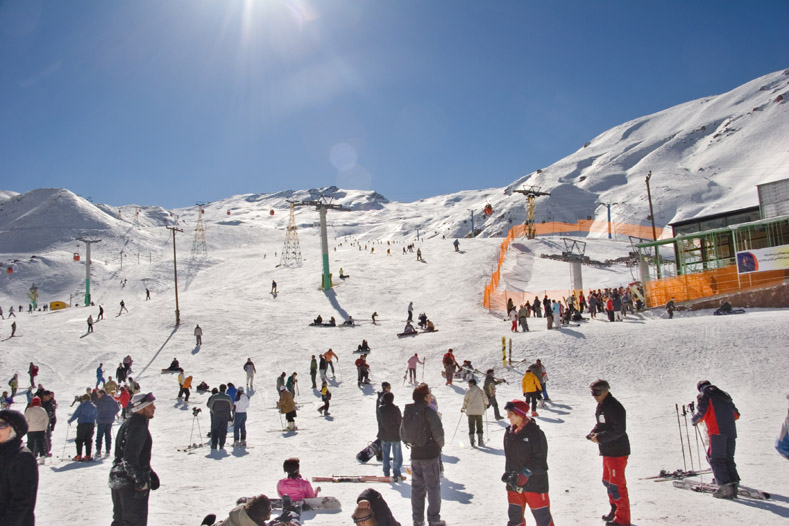
Seen from the Dizin ski resort.

Milad tower

- Amir Kabir Lake
- Azadi Sports complex
- Chitgar Park
- Darabad hiking trail
- Darakeh hiking trail
- Darband (hiking trail)
- Enghelab Sports Complex and Golf course
- Eram Amusement Park
- Jahan-e Kudak Park
- Jamshidieh Park
- Kavir National Park
- Khojir National Park
- Laleh Park
- Lar Protected Natural Habitat
- Latyan Lake
- Lavizan Forest Park
- Mellat Park
- Niavaran Park
- Police Park
- Sa'ei Park
- Shatranj Park
- Tangeh Savashi
- Tar Lake
- Vard-Avard Forest Park
- Varjeen Protected Natural Habitat
- Several caves, springs, and waterfalls outside Tehran

== Religious centers ==
=== Mosques, shrines, mausoleums, and tombs ===
- Soltani Mosque, built by Fath Ali Shah
- Atiq Mosque, built in 1663.
- Mo'ezz o-dowleh mosque, built by Fath Ali Shah
- Haj Seyd Azizollah mosque, built by Fath Ali Shah
- Al-javad mosque, Iran's first modernist design mosque.
- The Old Sepahsalar mosque, another prominent Qajar era mosque.
- The new Sepahsalar Mosque (Madreseh e Motahari)
- Filsuf o-dowleh Mosque, Qajar era
- Moshir ol-Saltaneh Mosque, Qajar era
- Mo'ayyer ol-Mamalik Mosque, Qajar era
- Shahr Banu Mausopleum
- Javan-mard Qassab Mausoleum, a pre-Islamic semi-mythical hero
- Dozens of Imam-zadeh shrines, hundreds of years old, including that of Imam Zadeh Saleh.
- Dozens of Saqa Khanehs: traditional places of prayer
- Several Tekyehs: traditional places for mourning Muharram ceremonies for Husayn ibn Ali.
- Ebn-e Babooyeh cemetery, where numerous Iranian figures, such as Takhti and Ali Akbar Dehkhoda, are buried.
- Zahir o-dowleh cemetery, housing the tombs of art and cultural figures such as Iraj Mirza, Mohammad Taghi Bahar, Forough Farrokhzad, Abolhasan Saba, Ruhollah Khaleghi, and Darvish-khan are buried.
- Kordan Tomb, Seljuqi era, Karaj.
- Maydanak Tomb, 13th century, Karaj
- The Polish cemetery north of Tehran, where numerous Western Allied soldiers of World War II are buried

=== Churches ===
- Assyrian Church
- Enjili Church, 1867
- Thaddeus Bartoqimus Church, 1808
- Surep Georg Church, 1790

== Higher education ==
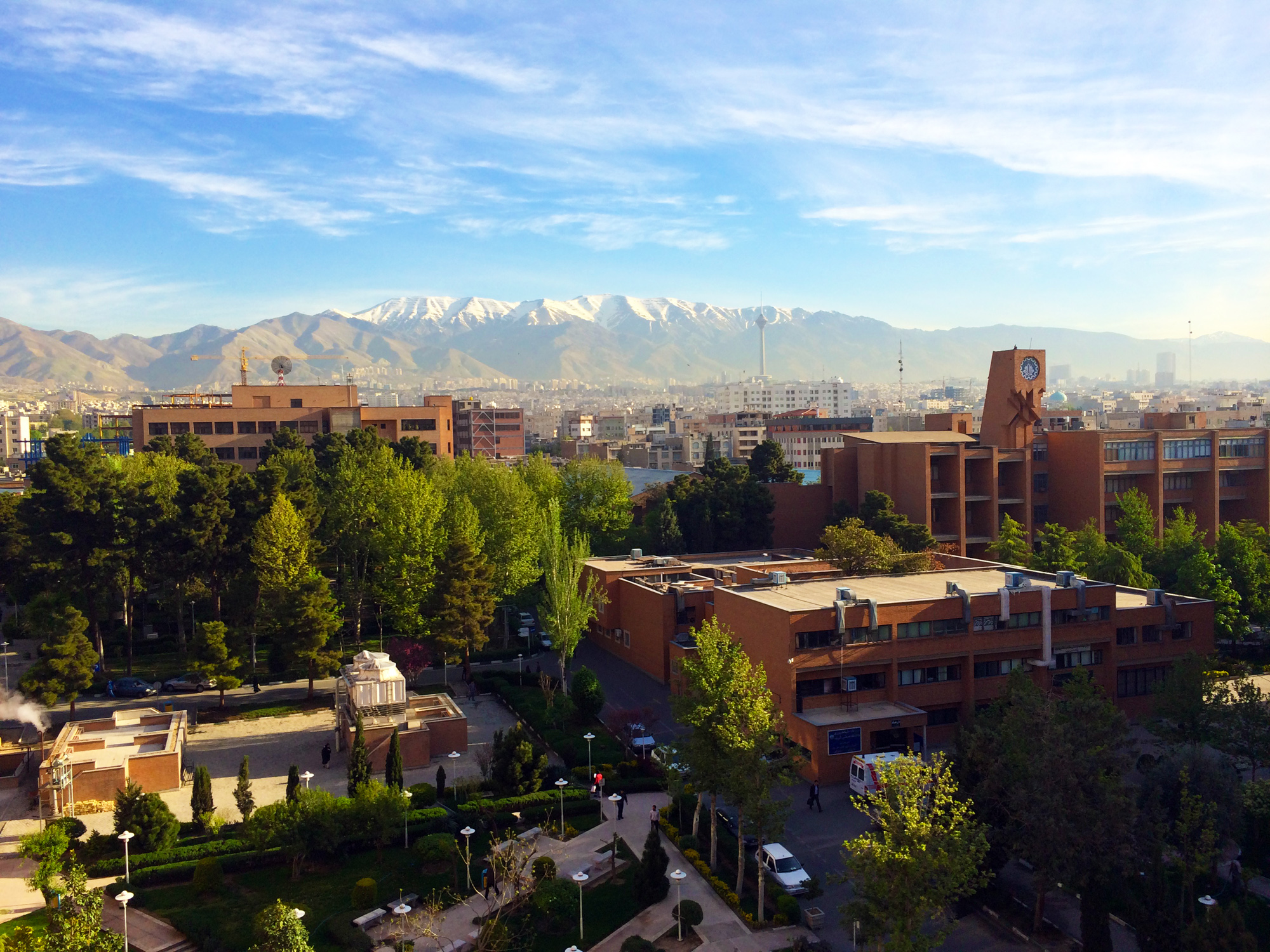
Sharif University of Technology main campus

Tehran province's major universities are:

- Allameh Tabatabaii University
- Alzahra University
- Amirkabir University of Technology (Tehran Polytechnic)
- Bagher Aloloum University
- Baqiyatallah Medical Sciences University
- Comprehensive University of Technology
- Farabi Institute of Virtual Higher Education
- Hadith College of Tehran
- Imam Ali University for Army Officers
- Imam Hossein University
- Imam Sadeq University (ISU)
- Institute for Studies in Theoretical Physics and Mathematics (IPM)
- Iran College of Tele-communications
- Iran Polymer and Petrochemical Institute
- Iran University of Medical Sciences
- Iran University of Science and Technology (IUST)
- Islamic Azad University Central Tehran Branch
- Islamic Azad University North Tehran Branch
- Islamic Azad University of Damavand
- Islamic Azad University of Islamshahr
- Islamic Azad University of Pishva
- Islamic Azad University of Roodehen
- Islamic Azad University of Tehran-Medical Sciences
- Islamic Azad University of Tehran-Science and Research
- Islamic Azad University of Tehran-South
- K. N. Toosi University of Technology
- Medical University for the Islamic Republic of Iran's Army
- NAJA University of Police
- Payame Noor University
- Power and Water Institute of Technology (PWIT)
- The Research Institute of The Petroleum Industry
- School of Economic Affairs (SEA)
- School of International Relations
- Shahid Beheshti University of Medical Sciences
- Shahid Beheshti University
- Shahid Sattari University of Aeronautical Engineering
- Shahed University
- Shahed University of Medical Sciences
- Shamsipour Technical College
- Shariaty Technical College
- Sharif University of Technology
- Tarbiat Moaalem University
- Tarbiat Modarres University (Professor Training University)
- Tehran University of Applied Science and Technology
- Tehran University of Medical Sciences
- University of Islamic Sects
- University of Social Welfare and Rehabilitation Sciences
- University of The Arts
- University of Tehran

== See also ==
- Architecture of Tehran
- Economy of Iran
- Tehran (city)
- Metro Tehran
- Tehran-Shomal Freeway

== Bibliography ==
- Ahmady, Kameel (2023). From Border to Border. Moldova: Scholars' Press publishes. ISBN 9786206769538.
- Mahmoudian, Ali Akbar (2008). A Look at Tehran from the Beginning Until Now. Tehran: Institute of Geographical and Cartographic Gitaology.
- Shahri, Jafar (2002). Old Tehran (in Persian). Tehran: Moein publication.
