= Hesar, Iran =

Hesar (Persian: حصار), also sometimes spelt as Hasar may refer to several places:

== Ardabil Province ==
- Hesar, Ardabil

== Bushehr Province ==
- Hesar, Bushehr

== East Azerbaijan Province ==
- Hesar, Ahar, a village in Ahar County
- Hesar, Bostanabad, a village in Bostanabad County
- Hesar, Charuymaq, a village in Charuymaq County
- Hesar, Meyaneh, a village in Meyaneh County
- Hesar, Kandovan, a village in Meyaneh County
- Hesar, Sarab, a village in Sarab County

== Fars Province ==
- Hesar, Fars, a village in Marvdasht County

== Hamadan Province ==
- Hesar-e Qarah Baghi, a village in Bahar County
- Hesar-e Qujeh Baghi, a village in Kabudarahang County
- Hesar-e Babakhan, a village in Malayer County

== Hormozgan Province ==
- Hesar, Hormozgan, a village in Jask County

== Ilam Province ==
- Hesar-e Shaveh, a village in Eyvan County

== Kermanshah Province ==
- Hesar, Kermanshah, a village in Kangavar County
- Hesar-e Sefid, Kermanshah, a village in Kermanshah County

== Khuzestan Province ==
- Hesar, Khuzestan, a village in Izeh County

== Markazi Province ==
- Hesar, Shazand, a village in Shazand County
- Hesar, Zarandieh, a village in Zarandieh County

== North Khorasan Province ==
- Hesar, North Khorasan, a village in Shirvan County
- Hesar Andaf, a village in Faruj County
- Hesar-e Devin, a village in Shirvan County
- Hesar-e Garmkhan, a city in North Khorasan Province, Iran
- Hesar-e Honameh, a village in Shirvan County
- Hesar-e Isa, a village in Jajrom County, North Khorasan Province, Iran
- Hesar-e Kordha, a village in Esfarayen County, North Khorasan Province, Iran
- Hesar-e Pahlavanlu, a village in Shirvan County, North Khorasan Province, Iran
- Hesari-ye Gazerani, a village in North Khorasan Province, Iran
- Hesar Rural District, in North Khorasan Province

== Qazvin Province ==
- Hesar, Qazvin
- Hesar, Takestan, Qazvin

== Razavi Khorasan Province ==
- Hesar, Chapeshlu, a village in Dargaz County
- Hesar, Lotfabad, a village in Dargaz County
- Hesar-e Kushk, a village in Firuzeh County
- Hesar-e Hajji Esmail, a village in Kalat County
- Hesar, Mashhad, a village in Mashhad County
- Hesar, Eshaqabad, a village in Nishapur County
- Hesar, Nishapur, a village in Nishapur County
- Hesar, Zeberkhan, a village in Nishapur County
- Hesar-e Khuni, a village in Nishapur County
- Hesar, Quchan, a village in Quchan County
- Hesar, Torbat-e Heydarieh, a village in Torbat-e Heydarieh County
- Hesar, Torqabeh and Shandiz, a village in Torqabeh and Shandiz County
- Hesar, Zaveh, a village in Zaveh County

== South Khorasan Province ==
- Hesar, South Khorasan, a village in Khusf County
- Hesar Dar, a village in Khusf County
- Hesar-e Sangi, a village in Birjand County

== Tehran Province ==
- Hesar, Malard
- Hesar, Pakdasht
- Hesar-e Pain

== West Azerbaijan Province ==
- Hesar, Bukan, a village in Bukan County
- Hesar, Khoy, a village in Khoy County
- Hesar-e Qarah Tappeh, a village in Khoy County
- Hesar-e Sofla, West Azerbaijan, a village in Khoy County
- Hesar, Maku, a village in Maku County
- Hesar, Shahin Dezh, a village in Shahin Dezh County
- Hesar-e Agh Bolagh, a village in Urmia County
- Hesar-e Babaganjeh, a village in Urmia County
- Hesar-e Bahram Khan, a village in Urmia County
- Hesar-e Gapuchi, a village in Urmia County
- Hesar-e Hajjilar, a village in Urmia County
- Hesar Kharabeh, a village in Urmia County
- Hesar-e Sopurghan, a village in Urmia County
- Hesar-e Tarmani, a village in Urmia County
- Hesar-e Torkaman, a village in Urmia County

== Zanjan Province ==
- Hesar, Zanjan, a village in Zanjan County
- Hesar-e Abd ol Karim, a village in Abhar County
- Hesar-e Qajar, a village in Abhar County
- Hesar, Khodabandeh, a village in Khodabandeh County
- Hesar-e Olya, Zanjan, a village in Khodabandeh County
- Hesar Shivan, a village in Khodabandeh County
- Hesar-e Sofla, Zanjan, a village in Khodabandeh County

== See also ==
- Hesar-e Bala (disambiguation)
- Hesar Mehtar (disambiguation)
- Hesarak (disambiguation)
- Hisar (disambiguation)
