= Abbasabad-e Zargham =

Neighborhood in Tehran province, Iran

Abbasabad-e Zargham Persian: عباس ابادضرغام
- Neighborhood
- Location within Iran
- Coordinates: 35°24′56″N 51°47′46″E
- Country: Iran
- Province: Tehran
- County: Pakdasht
- District: Sharifabad
- City: Sharifabad

Population (2016)
  - Total: 585
- Time zone: UTC+3:30 (IRST)

Abbasabad-e Zargham (Persian: عباس ابادضرغام) (Note: Also romanized as ‘Abbāsābād-e Ẕarghām; also known as ‘Abbāsābād) is a neighborhood in the city of Sharifabad in Sharifabad District of Pakdasht County, Tehran province, Iran.

== Demographics ==
=== Population ===
At the time of the 2006 National Census, Abbasabad-e Zargham's population was 2,518 in 782 households, when it was a village in Sharifabad Rural District. The following census in 2011 counted 1,577 people in 553 households. The 2016 census measured the population of the village as 585 people in 190 households.

Abbasabad-e Zargham was annexed by the city of Sharifabad in 2021.
