= Khosrow, Tehran =

Neighborhood in Tehran province, Iran

Khosrow Persian: خسرو
- Neighborhood
- Location within Iran
- Coordinates: 35°26′21″N 51°44′43″E
- Country: Iran
- Province: Tehran
- County: Pakdasht
- District: Sharifabad
- City: Sharifabad

Population (2016)
  - Total: 1,413
- Time zone: UTC+3:30 (IRST)

Khosrow (Persian: خسرو) is a neighborhood in the city of Sharifabad in Sharifabad District of Pakdasht County, Tehran province, Iran.

== Demographics ==
=== Population ===
At the time of the 2006 National Census, Khosrow's population was 897 in 246 households, when it was a village in Jamalabad Rural District. The following census in 2011 counted 1,419 people in 346 households. The 2016 census measured the population of the village as 1,413 people in 357 households.

The village was annexed by the city of Sharifabad in 2023.
