= Kalin =

Kalin may refer to:

== Places ==
- Kalin, East Azerbaijan, a village in East Azerbaijan Province, Iran
- Kalin, Qazvin, a village in Qazvin Province, Iran
- Kalin-e Khalaseh, a village in Tehran Province, Iran
- Kalin-e Sadat, a village in Tehran Province, Iran

== Other uses ==
- Kalin Lucas (born 1989), American basketball player in the Israel Basketball Premier League
- Kalin Terziyski (1970–2026), Bulgarian writer
- Kalin (surname)
- Kalin (Tamil origin name)

== See also ==
- Kälin
