= Hesar-e Amir =

Neighborhood in Tehran province, Iran

Hesar-e Amir Persian: حصارامير
- Neighborhood
- Location within Iran
- Coordinates: 35°30′49″N 51°41′59″E
- Country: Iran
- Province: Tehran
- County: Pakdasht
- District: Central
- City: Pakdasht

Population (2006)
  - Total: 25,281
- Time zone: UTC+3:30 (IRST)

Hesar-e Amir (Persian: حصارامير) (Note: Also romanized as Ḩeşār Amīr, Ḩeşār-e Amīr, and Ḩeşārāmīr,) is a neighborhood in the city of Pakdasht in the Central District of Pakdasht County, Tehran province, Iran. It served as the capital of Hesar-e Amir Rural District. (Note: Formerly Behnampazuki-ye Shomali Rural District)

== Demographics ==
=== Population ===
At the time of the 2006 National Census, Hesar-e Amir's population was 25,281 in 6,072 households, when it was in Hesar-e Amir Rural District. After the census, the village of Hesar-e Amir was annexed to the city of Pakdasht.
