= Hissar =

Hissar (Arabic: حصار) means fort or castle in Arabic, with variants adopted into Persian (hesar, hessar) and Turkish (hisar).

Hissar, Hisar and Hesar may refer to:

== Places ==
=== Asia (South and Central) ===
==== India ====
- Hisar (city), a city in Haryana
  - Hisar Airport in Hisar city, Haryana
  - Hisar Junction railway station
  - Deer Park, Hisar a park in Hisar city
  - Hisar Urban Agglomeration
- Hisar (Lok Sabha constituency), of the lower house of the Parliament
- Hisar (Vidhan Sabha constituency), in the Haryana Legislative Assembly
- Hisar district, a district in Haryana
- Hisar division, a division of Haryana

==== Tajikistan and Uzbekistan ====
- Gissar Range, mountain range in Tajikistan and Uzbekistan
  - Gissar Valley, in Tajikistan
- Hisor, a city in Tajikistan
- Hisor District, in Tajikistan

==== Afghanistan and Pakistan ====
- Hesar, Afghanistan, a village
- Bala Hissar, Kabul, an ancient fortress in Kabul, Afghanistan
- Bala Hissar, Peshawar, an ancient fortress in Peshawar, Pakistan
- Puli Hisar District in Baghlan Province, Afghanistan

=== Asia (Western) with Turkey ===
==== Iran ====
- Hesar, Iran (disambiguation), a list of places
- Hisar-e Sangi, a village
- Hisar Pain, a village
- Tepe Hissar, prehistoric site

==== Turkey ====
- Hisar, Acıpayam
- Hisar, Emirdağ
- Hisar Mosque, an historic Mosque in İzmir
- Hisarlik, an archaeological site believed to have been Troy
- Anadoluhisarı, a fortress on the Bosporus in Istanbul, Turkey
- Rumelihisarı, a fortress in Istanbul

=== Europe (Balkans) ===
- Hisar Hill, a hill in southern Serbia
- Hisarya, Bulgaria, a resort town
- Demir Hisar (town), a town in North Macedonia

== Other uses ==
- Hesar (Iranian film)
- HISAR (surface to air missile system), developed in Turkey
- Hughes Integrated Synthetic Aperture Radar (HISAR), used on the US-developed RQ-4 Global Hawk drones

== See also ==
- Hesarak (disambiguation), places in Afghanistan and Iran
