= Aliabad-e Kharabeh =

Aliabad-e Kharabeh علي ابادخرابه
- Village
- Location within Iran
- Coordinates: 35°21′33″N 51°52′07″E
- Country: Iran
- Province: Tehran
- County: Pakdasht
- Bakhsh: Sharifabad
- Rural District: Karimabad

Population (2006)
  - Total: 50
- Time zone: UTC+3:30 (IRST)
  - Summer (DST): UTC+4:30 (IRDT)

Aliabad-e Kharabeh (Persian: علي ابادخرابه, also Romanized as ‘Alīābād-e Kharābeh; also known as ‘Alīābād) is a village in Karimabad Rural District, Sharifabad District, Pakdasht County, Tehran Province, Iran. At the 2006 census, its population was 50, in 12 families.
