= Aluyak =

Village in Tehran province, Iran

Aluyak Persian: الوئك
- Village
- Location within Iran
- Coordinates: 35°27′15″N 51°43′20″E
- Country: Iran
- Province: Tehran
- County: Pakdasht
- District: Sharifabad
- Rural District: Jamalabad

Population (2016)
  - Total: 1,681
- Time zone: UTC+3:30 (IRST)

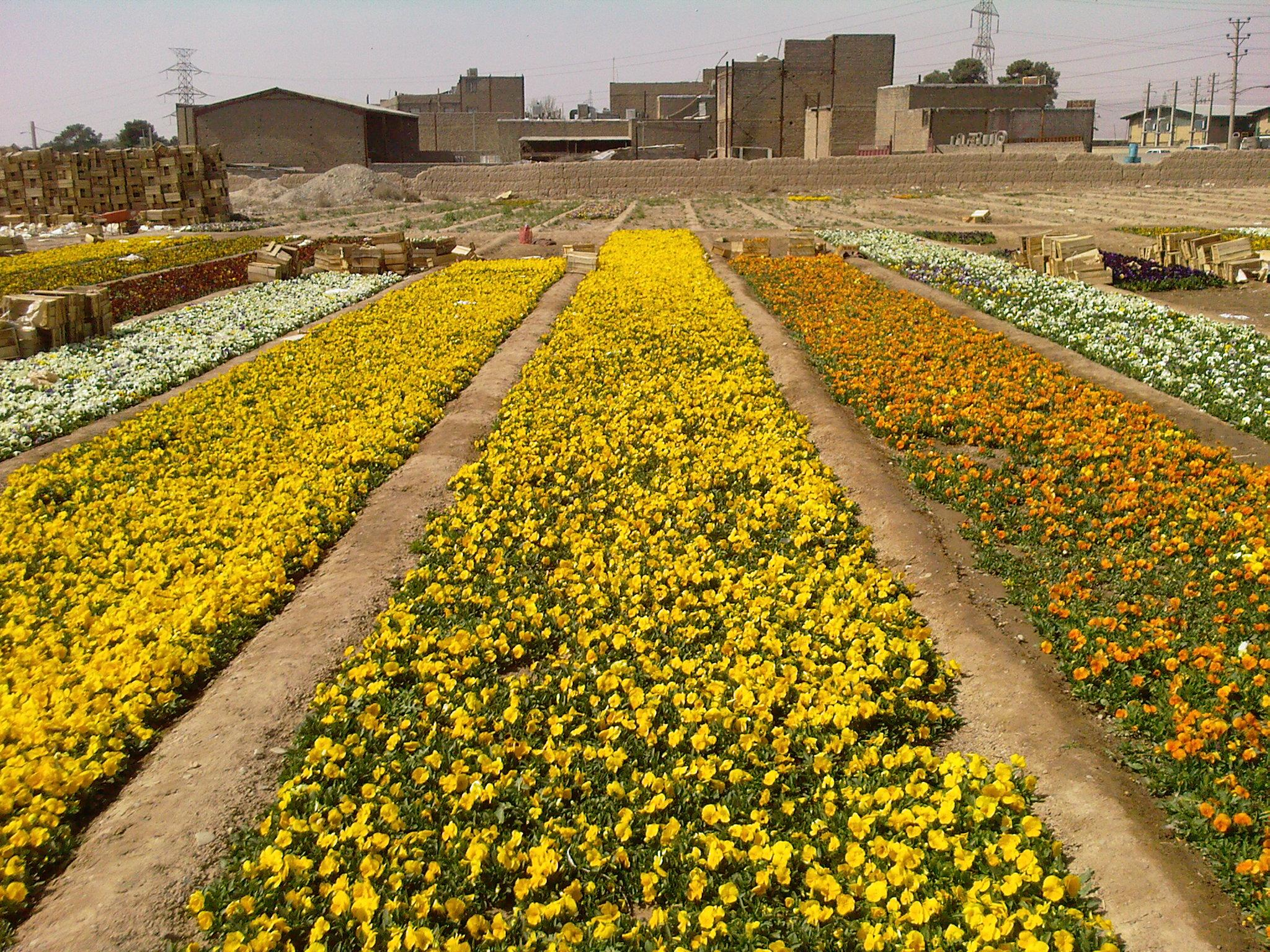
A flower farm in Aluyak

Aluyak (Persian: الوئك) (Note: Also romanized as Alūyak; also known as Ālū’ak, Ālūtak and Ālūwank) is a village in Jamalabad Rural District of Sharifabad District in Pakdasht County, Tehran province, Iran.

== Demographics ==
=== Population ===
At the time of the 2006 National Census, the village's population was 1,762 in 427 households. The following census in 2011 counted 1,868 people in 494 households. The 2016 census measured the population of the village as 1,681 people in 473 households.
