= Qeshlaq-e Karimabad =

Village in Tehran province, Iran

Qeshlaq-e Karimabad Persian: قشلاق كريم اباد
- Village
- Location within Iran
- Coordinates: 35°22′47″N 51°48′36″E
- Country: Iran
- Province: Tehran
- County: Pakdasht
- District: Sharifabad
- Rural District: Karimabad

Population (2016)
  - Total: 943
- Time zone: UTC+3:30 (IRST)

Qeshlaq-e Karimabad (Persian: قشلاق كريم اباد) (Note: Also romanized as Qeshlāq-e Karīmābād) is a village in Karimabad Rural District (Note: Formerly Behnamsokhteh-e Shomali Rural District) of Sharifabad District in Pakdasht County, Tehran province, Iran.

== Demographics ==
=== Population ===
At the time of the 2006 National Census, the village's population was 796 in 186 households. The following census in 2011 counted 896 people in 225 households. The 2016 census measured the population of the village as 943 people in 250 households.
