= Hesar-e Sofla =

Hesar-e Sofla or Hesar Sofla (Persian: حصارسفلي) may refer to:

- Hesar-e Sofla, Tehran
- Hesar-e Sofla, West Azerbaijan
- Hesar-e Sofla, Zanjan
