= Jitu =

Village in Tehran province, Iran

Jitu Persian: جيتو
- Village
- Location within Iran
- Coordinates: 35°27′40″N 51°39′17″E
- Country: Iran
- Province: Tehran
- County: Pakdasht
- District: Central
- Rural District: Filestan

Population (2016)
  - Total: 2,346
- Time zone: UTC+3:30 (IRST)

Jitu (Persian: جيتو) (Note: Also romanized as Jītū; also known as Jūtū) is a village in Filestan Rural District of the Central District in Pakdasht County, Tehran province, Iran.

== Demographics ==
=== Population ===
At the time of the 2006 National Census, the village's population was 1,774 in 459 households. The following census in 2011 counted 2,584 people in 684 households. The 2016 census measured the population of the village as 2,346 people in 632 households.
