= Afarin =

Afarin may refer to:

- Afarin Neyssari, Iranian-American architect
- Afarin Sajedi, Iranian artist from Shiraz
- Afarin Lahori, Punjabi-Persian Poet
- Khoda Afarin Dam, Dam on Aras river in Iran and Azerbaijan

== Places ==
- Afarin, Pakdasht, Village in Tehran, Iran
- Alherd, Khoda Afarin, village in Minjavan District of Iran
- Pesyan, Khoda Afarin, village in East Azerbaijan Province, Iran
- Ahmadabad, Khoda Afarin, village in East Azerbaijan Province, Iran
- Mahmudabad, Khoda Afarin, village east Azerbaijan province, Iran
