= Jamalabad, Tehran =

Village in Tehran province, Iran

Jamalabad Persian: جمال اباد
- Village
- Location within Iran
- Coordinates: 35°24′16″N 51°42′51″E
- Country: Iran
- Province: Tehran
- County: Pakdasht
- District: Sharifabad
- Rural District: Jamalabad

Population (2016)
  - Total: 2,501
- Time zone: UTC+3:30 (IRST)

Jamalabad (Persian: جمال اباد) (Note: Also romanized as Jamālābād) is a village in, and the capital of, Jamalabad Rural District in Sharifabad District of Pakdasht County, Tehran province, Iran.

== Demographics ==
=== Population ===
At the time of the 2006 National Census, the village's population was 1,717 in 439 households. The following census in 2011 counted 2,099 people in 554 households. The 2016 census measured the population of the village as 2,501 people in 698 households.
