= Arambuiyeh =

Village in Tehran province, Iran

Arambouyeh Persian: ارمبويه
- Village
- Location within Iran
- Coordinates: 35°25′42″N 51°40′53″E
- Country: Iran
- Province: Tehran
- County: Pakdasht
- District: Central

Population (2016)
  - Total: 1,949
- Time zone: UTC+3:30 (IRST)

Arambouyeh (Persian: ارمبويه) (Note: Also romanized as Arambū’īyeh; also known as Arambū) is a village in Pakdasht of the Central District in Pakdasht County, Tehran province, Iran.

== Demographics ==
=== Population ===
At the time of the 2006 National Census, the village's population was 1,577 in 382 households. The following census in 2011 counted 1,738 people in 481 households. The 2016 census measured the population of the village as 1,949 people in 533 households.
