= Neyak, Tehran =

Village in Tehran province, Iran

Neyak Persian: نيك
- Village
- Location within Iran
- Country: Iran
- Province: Tehran
- County: Pakdasht
- District: Central
- Rural District: Hesar-e Amir

Population (2016)
  - Total: 40
- Time zone: UTC+3:30 (IRST)

Neyak (Persian: نيك) (Note: Also romanized as Nīk; also known as Neyak-e Bālā) is a village in Hesar-e Amir Rural District (Note: Formerly Behnampazuki-ye Shomali Rural District) of the Central District in Pakdasht County, Tehran province, Iran.

== Demographics ==
=== Population ===
At the time of the 2006 National Census, the village's population was 111 in 31 households. The following census in 2011 counted 165 people in 52 households. The 2016 census measured the population of the village as 40 people in 12 households.
