= Parchin, Tehran =

Village in Tehran province, Iran

Parchin Persian: پارچين
- Village
- Location within Iran
- Coordinates: 35°32′44″N 51°46′45″E
- Country: Iran
- Province: Tehran
- County: Pakdasht
- District: Central
- Rural District: Hesar-e Amir

Population (2016)
  - Total: 1,865
- Time zone: UTC+3:30 (IRST)

Parchin (Persian: پارچين) (Note: Also romanized as Pārchīn; also known as Mojtame‘-e Maskūnī-ye Pārchīn) is a village in Hesar-e Amir Rural District (Note: Formerly Behnampazuki-ye Shomali Rural District) of the Central District in Pakdasht County, Tehran province, Iran.

== Demographics ==
=== Population ===
At the time of the 2006 National Census, the village's population was 4,111 in 1,186 households. The following census in 2011 counted 1,806 people in 431 households. The 2016 census measured the population of the village as 1,865 people in 581 households.
