= Kabud Gonbad, Tehran =

Village in Tehran province, Iran

Kabud Gonbad Persian: كبودگنبد
- Village
- Location within Iran
- Coordinates: 35°28′06″N 51°44′45″E
- Country: Iran
- Province: Tehran
- County: Pakdasht
- District: Sharifabad
- Rural District: Jamalabad

Population (2016)
  - Total: 819
- Time zone: UTC+3:30 (IRST)

Kabud Gonbad (Persian: كبودگنبد) (Note: Also romanized as Kabūd Gonbad) is a village in Jamalabad Rural District of Sharifabad District in Pakdasht County, Tehran province, Iran.

== Demographics ==
=== Population ===
At the time of the 2006 National Census, the village's population was 738 in 168 households. The following census in 2011 counted 1,104 people in 283 households. The 2016 census measured the population of the village as 819 people in 224 households.
