= Qeshlaq-e Qaleh Now-e Amlak =

Village in Tehran province, Iran

Qeshlaq-e Qaleh Now-e Amlak Persian: قشلاق قلعه نواملاك
- Village
- Location within Iran
- Coordinates: 35°28′40″N 51°36′11″E
- Country: Iran
- Province: Tehran
- County: Pakdasht
- District: Central
- Rural District: Ferunabad

Population (2016)
  - Total: 506
- Time zone: UTC+3:30 (IRST)

Qeshlaq-e Qaleh Now-e Amlak (Persian: قشلاق قلعه نواملاك) (Note: Also romanized as Qeshlāq-e Qal‘eh Now-e Amlāk; also known as Qeshlāq Qal‘eh and Qeshlāq-e Qal‘eh Now) is a village in Ferunabad Rural District of the Central District in Pakdasht County, Tehran province, Iran.

== Demographics ==
=== Population ===
At the time of the 2006 National Census, the village's population was 407 in 203 households. The following census in 2011 counted 444 people in 105 households. The 2016 census measured the population of the village as 506 people in 145 households.
