= Hoseynabad-e Qajar =

Village in Tehran province, Iran

Hoseynabad-e Qajar Persian: حسين ابادقاجار
- Village
- Location within Iran
- Coordinates: 35°25′08″N 51°41′39″E
- Country: Iran
- Province: Tehran
- County: Pakdasht
- District: Sharifabad
- Rural District: Jamalabad

Population (2016)
  - Total: 66
- Time zone: UTC+3:30 (IRST)

Hoseynabad-e Qajar (Persian: حسين ابادقاجار) (Note: Also romanized as Ḩoseynābād-e Qājār; also known as Ḩoseīnābād and Ḩoseynābād) is a village in Jamalabad Rural District of Sharifabad District in Pakdasht County, Tehran province, Iran.

== Demographics ==
=== Population ===
At the time of the 2006 National Census, the village's population was 33 in 10 households. The following census in 2011 counted 24 people in 13 households. The 2016 census measured the population of the village as 66 people in 22 households.
