= Qeshlaq-e Hajjiabad =

Village in Tehran province, Iran

Qeshlaq-e Hajjiabad Persian: قشلاق حاجي اباد
- Village
- Location within Iran
- Coordinates: 35°28′52″N 51°36′17″E
- Country: Iran
- Province: Tehran
- County: Pakdasht
- District: Central
- Rural District: Ferunabad

Population (2016)
  - Total: 978
- Time zone: UTC+3:30 (IRST)

Qeshlaq-e Hajjiabad (Persian: قشلاق حاجي اباد) (Note: Also romanized as Qeshlāq-e Ḩājjīābād) is a village in Ferunabad Rural District of the Central District in Pakdasht County, Tehran province, Iran.

== Demographics ==
=== Population ===
At the time of the 2006 National Census, the village's population was 906 in 203 households. The following census in 2011 counted 982 people in 255 households. The 2016 census measured the population of the village as 978 people in 261 households.
