= Qaleh-ye Abdolabad =

Village in Tehran province, Iran

Qaleh-ye Abdolabad Persian: قلعه عبدل اباد
- Village
- Location within Iran
- Coordinates: 35°22′54″N 51°51′28″E
- Country: Iran
- Province: Tehran
- County: Pakdasht
- District: Sharifabad
- Rural District: Sharifabad

Population (2016)
  - Total: 1,060
- Time zone: UTC+3:30 (IRST)

Qaleh-ye Abdolabad (Persian: قلعه عبدل اباد) (Note: Also romanized as Qal‘eh-ye ʿAbdolābād) is a village in Sharifabad Rural District of Sharifabad District in Pakdasht County, Tehran province, Iran.

== Demographics ==
=== Population ===
At the time of the 2006 National Census, the village's population was 724 in 168 households. The following census in 2011 counted 695 people in 192 households. The 2016 census measured the population of the village as 1,060 people in 288 households.
