= Changi, Iran =

Village in Tehran province, Iran

Changi Persian: چنگي
- Village
- Location within Iran
- Coordinates: 35°29′20″N 51°44′55″E
- Country: Iran
- Province: Tehran
- County: Pakdasht
- District: Central
- Rural District: Hesar-e Amir

Population (2016)
  - Total: 2,015
- Time zone: UTC+3:30 (IRST)

Changi (Persian: چنگي) (Note: Also romanized as Changī) is a village in Hesar-e Amir Rural District (Note: Formerly Behnampazuki-ye Shomali Rural District) of the Central District in Pakdasht County, Tehran province, Iran.

== Demographics ==
=== Population ===
At the time of the 2006 National Census, the village's population was 1,837 in 507 households. The following census in 2011 counted 2,018 people in 590 households. The 2016 census measured the population of the village as 2,015 people in 636 households. It was the most populous village in its rural district.
