= Filestan =

Village in Tehran province, Iran

Filestan Persian: فيلستان
- Village
- Location within Iran
- Coordinates: 35°26′01″N 51°40′01″E
- Country: Iran
- Province: Tehran
- County: Pakdasht
- District: Central
- Rural District: Filestan

Population (2016)
  - Total: 4,431
- Time zone: UTC+3:30 (IRST)

Filestan (Persian: فيلستان) (Note: Also romanized as Fīlestān; also known as Fīlistān) is a village in, and the capital of, Filestan Rural District in the Central District of Pakdasht County, Tehran province, Iran.

== Demographics ==
=== Population ===
At the time of the 2006 National Census, the village's population was 4,476 in 1,121 households. The following census in 2011 counted 4,716 people in 1,258 households. The 2016 census measured the population of the village as 4,431 people in 1,229 households.
