= Qeshlaq-e Ferunabad =

Village in Tehran province, Iran

Qeshlaq-e Ferunabad Persian: قشلاق فرون اباد
- Village
- Location within Iran
- Coordinates: 35°29′58″N 51°37′02″E
- Country: Iran
- Province: Tehran
- County: Pakdasht
- District: Central
- Rural District: Ferunabad

Population (2016)
  - Total: 518
- Time zone: UTC+3:30 (IRST)

Qeshlaq-e Ferunabad (Persian: قشلاق فرون اباد) (Note: Also romanized as Qeshlāq-e Ferūnābād; also known as Ferūnābād and Forūnābād) is a village in Ferunabad Rural District of the Central District in Pakdasht County, Tehran province, Iran.

== Demographics ==
=== Population ===
At the time of the 2006 National Census, the village's population was 513 in 125 households. The following census in 2011 counted 661 people in 178 households. The 2016 census measured the population of the village as 518 people in 148 households.
