= Hajjiabad-e Amlak =

Village in Tehran province, Iran

Hajjiabad-e Amlak Persian: حاجي اباداملاك
- Village
- Location within Iran
- Coordinates: 35°29′10″N 51°37′04″E
- Country: Iran
- Province: Tehran
- County: Pakdasht
- District: Central
- Rural District: Ferunabad

Population (2016)
  - Total: 702
- Time zone: UTC+3:30 (IRST)

Hajjiabad-e Amlak (Persian: حاجي اباداملاك) (Note: Also romanized as Ḩājjīābād-e Āmlāḵ; also known as Ḩājīābād and Ḩājjīābād) is a village in Ferunabad Rural District of the Central District in Pakdasht County, Tehran province, Iran.

== Demographics ==
=== Population ===
At the time of the 2006 National Census, the village's population was 686 in 173 households. The following census in 2011 counted 600 people in 165 households. The 2016 census measured the population of the village as 702 people in 202 households.
