= Ebrahimabad, Tehran =

Village in Tehran province, Iran

Ebrahimabad Persian: ابراهيماباد
- Village
- Location within Iran
- Coordinates: 35°22′59″N 51°50′58″E
- Country: Iran
- Province: Tehran
- County: Pakdasht
- District: Sharifabad
- Rural District: Sharifabad

Population (2016)
  - Total: 2,036
- Time zone: UTC+3:30 (IRST)

Ebrahimabad (Persian: ابراهيماباد) (Note: Also romanized as Ebrāhīmābād) is a village in Sharifabad Rural District of Sharifabad District in Pakdasht County, Tehran province, Iran.

== Demographics ==
=== Population ===
At the time of the 2006 National Census, the village's population was 1,725 in 436 households. The following census in 2011 counted 2,181 people in 594 households. The 2016 census measured the population of the village as 2,036 people in 570 households.
