= Mahmudabad-e Khalaseh =

Village in Tehran province, Iran

Mahmudabad-e Khalaseh Persian: محمودآباد پازوکی
- Village
- Location within Iran
- Coordinates: 35°24′54″N 51°40′16″E
- Country: Iran
- Province: Tehran
- County: Pakdasht
- District: Central
- Rural District: Filestan

Population (2016)
  - Total: 1,218
- Time zone: UTC+3:30 (IRST)

Mahmudabad-e Khalaseh (Persian: محمودابادخالصه) (Note: Also romanized as Maḩmūdābād-e Khālaṣeh; also known as Maḩmūdābād, Mahmudabad-e Pazoki, Maḩmūdābād-e Pazoki, and Maḩmūdābād-e Pāzūkī) is a village in Filestan Rural District of the Central District in Pakdasht County, Tehran province, Iran.

== Demographics ==
=== Population ===
At the time of the 2006 National Census, the village's population was 1,185 in 285 households. The following census in 2011 counted 1,263 people in 325 households. The 2016 census measured the population of the village as 1,218 people in 350 households.
