= Abdolabad, Tehran =

Village in Tehran province, Iran

Abdolabad Persian: عبدل‌آباد
- Village
- Location within Iran
- Coordinates: 35°22′40″N 51°51′24″E
- Country: Iran
- Province: Tehran
- County: Pakdasht
- District: Sharifabad
- Rural District: Sharifabad

Population (2016)
  - Total: 582
- Time zone: UTC+3:30 (IRST)

Abdolabad (Persian: عبدل‌آباد) (Note: Also romanized as ‘Abdolābād; also known as Abdollāhābād) is a village in Sharifabad Rural District of Sharifabad District in Pakdasht County, Tehran province, Iran.

== Demographics ==
=== Population ===
At the time of the 2006 National Census, the village's population was 403 in 99 households. The following census in 2011 counted 495 people in 134 households. The 2016 census measured the population of the village as 582 people in 154 households.
