= Kahrizak, Pakdasht =

Village in Tehran province, Iran

Kahrizak Persian: كهريزك
- Village
- Location within Iran
- Coordinates: 35°20′48″N 51°50′39″E
- Country: Iran
- Province: Tehran
- County: Pakdasht
- District: Sharifabad
- Rural District: Karimabad

Population (2016)
  - Total: 325
- Time zone: UTC+3:30 (IRST)

Kahrizak (Persian: كهريزك) (Note: Also romanized as Kahrīzak; also known as Kahrīzak-e Mandekān) is a village in Karimabad Rural District (Note: Formerly Behnamsokhteh-e Shomali Rural District) of Sharifabad District in Pakdasht County, Tehran province, Iran.

== Demographics ==
=== Population ===
At the time of the 2006 National Census, the village's population was 338 in 85 households. The following census in 2011 counted 260 people in 78 households. The 2016 census measured the population of the village as 325 people in 107 households.
