= Kal Dasht =

Kal Dasht or Gol Dasht (Persian: كالدشت) may refer to:

- Kal Dasht-e Bala
- Kal Dasht-e Pain
