= Abbasabad, Pakdasht =

Village in Tehran province, Iran

Abbasabad Persian: عباس اباد
- Village
- Location within Iran
- Coordinates: 35°24′28″N 51°42′00″E
- Country: Iran
- Province: Tehran
- County: Pakdasht
- District: Sharifabad
- Rural District: Jamalabad

Population (2016)
  - Total: 214
- Time zone: UTC+3:30 (IRST)

Abbasabad (Persian: عباس اباد) (Note: Also romanized as ‘Abāsābād and ‘Abbāsābād; also known as ‘Abbāsābād-e Larnī) is a village in Jamalabad Rural District of Sharifabad District in Pakdasht County, Tehran province, Iran.

== Demographics ==
=== Population ===
At the time of the 2006 National Census, the village's population was 290 in 72 households. The following census in 2011 counted 236 people in 59 households. The 2016 census measured the population of the village as 214 people in 71 households.
