= Karimabad, Pakdasht =

Village in Tehran province, Iran

Karimabad Persian: كريم اباد
- Village
- Location within Iran
- Coordinates: 35°23′25″N 51°48′19″E
- Country: Iran
- Province: Tehran
- County: Pakdasht
- District: Sharifabad
- Rural District: Karimabad

Population (2016)
  - Total: 2,425
- Time zone: UTC+3:30 (IRST)

Karimabad (Persian: كريم اباد) (Note: Also romanized as Karīmābād; also known as Karīmābād-e Khāleşeh) is a village in, and the capital of, Karimabad Rural District (Note: Formerly Behnamsokhteh-e Shomali Rural District) in Sharifabad District of Pakdasht County, Tehran province, Iran.

== Demographics ==
=== Population ===
At the time of the 2006 National Census, the village's population was 2,332 in 567 households. The following census in 2011 counted 2,362 people in 618 households. The 2016 census measured the population of the village as 2,425 people in 692 households. It was the most populous village in its rural district.
