= Mojtame-e Shahid Namju =

Village in Tehran province, Iran

Mojtame-e Shahid Namju Persian: مجتمع شهيدنامجو
- Village
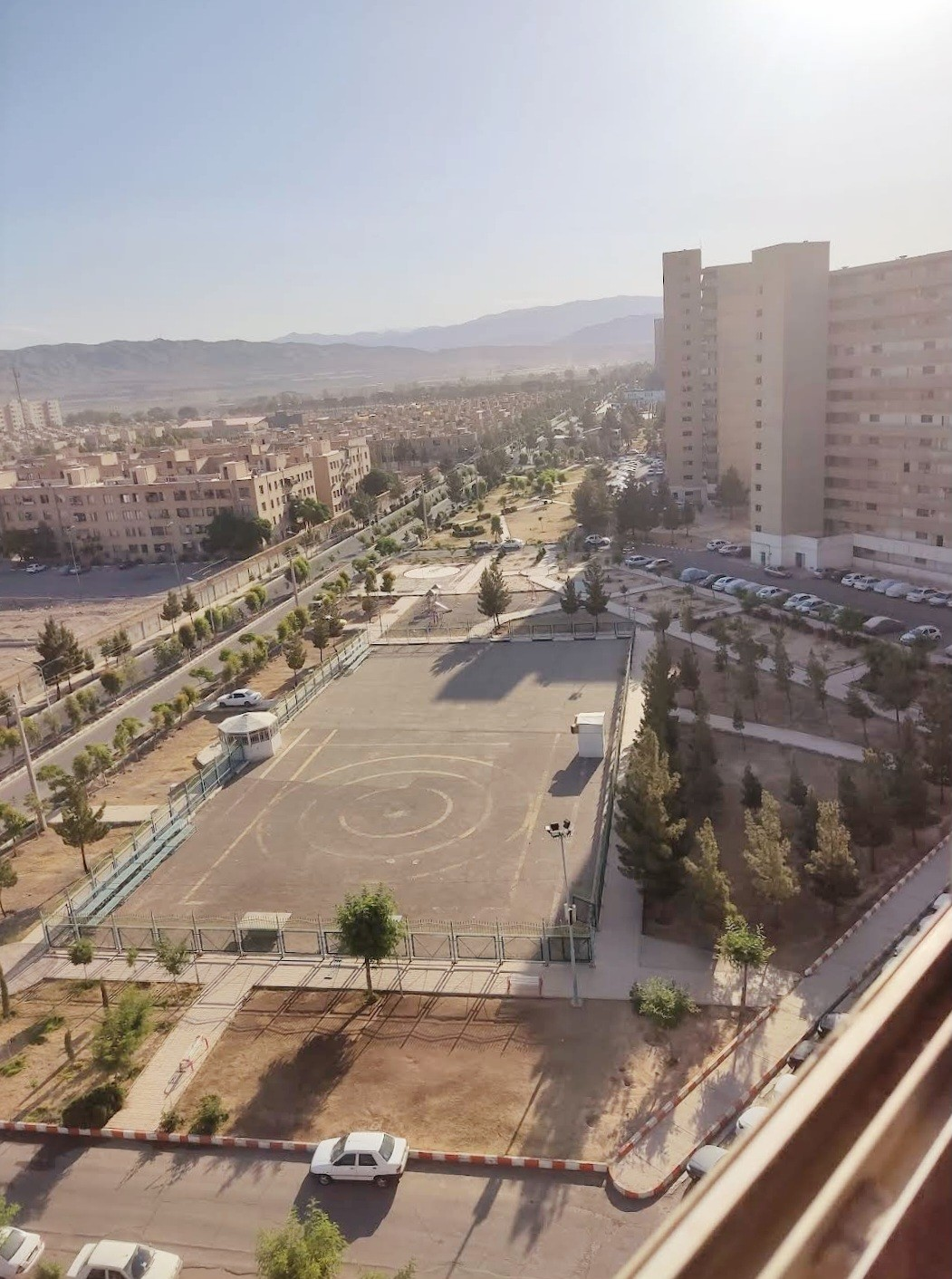

- Location within Iran
- Coordinates: 35°28′18″N 51°43′21″E
- Country: Iran
- Province: Tehran
- County: Pakdasht
- District: Sharifabad
- Rural District: Jamalabad

Population (2016)
  - Total: 22,990
- Time zone: UTC+3:30 (IRST)

Mojtame-e Shahid Namju (Persian: مجتمع شهيدنامجو) (Note: Also romanized as Mojtame'-e Shahīd Nāmjū) is a village in Jamalabad Rural District of Sharifabad District in Pakdasht County, Tehran province, Iran.

== Demographics ==
=== Population ===
At the time of the 2006 National Census, the village's population was 7,281 in 1,999 households. The following census in 2011 counted 6,676 people in 1,905 households. The 2016 census measured the population of the village as 22,990 people in 6,892 households. It was the most populous village in its rural district.
