= Hamamak =

Village in Tehran province, Iran

Hamamak Persian: حمامك
- Village
- Location within Iran
- Coordinates: 35°30′37″N 51°47′03″E
- Country: Iran
- Province: Tehran
- County: Pakdasht
- District: Central
- Rural District: Hesar-e Amir

Population (2016)
  - Total: 816
- Time zone: UTC+3:30 (IRST)

Hamamak (Persian: حمامك) (Note: Also romanized as Ḩamāmak) is a village in Hesar-e Amir Rural District (Note: Formerly Behnampazuki-ye Shomali Rural District) of the Central District in Pakdasht County, Tehran province, Iran.

== Demographics ==
=== Population ===
At the time of the 2006 National Census, the village's population was 970 in 248 households. The following census in 2011 counted 911 people in 253 households. The 2016 census measured the population of the village as 816 people in 253 households.
