= Towchal, Tehran =

Village in Tehran province, Iran

Towchal Persian: توچال
- Village
- Location within Iran
- Coordinates: 35°34′29″N 51°42′47″E
- Country: Iran
- Province: Tehran
- County: Pakdasht
- District: Central
- Rural District: Hesar-e Amir

Population (2016)
  - Total: 1,613
- Time zone: UTC+3:30 (IRST)

Towchal (Persian: توچال) (Note: Also romanized as Towchāl) is a village in Hesar-e Amir Rural District (Note: Formerly Behnampazuki-ye Shomali Rural District) of the Central District in Pakdasht County, Tehran province, Iran.

== Demographics ==
=== Population ===
At the time of the 2006 National Census, the village's population was 1,551 in 423 households. The following census in 2011 counted 1,707 people in 560 households. The 2016 census measured the population of the village as 1,613 people in 521 households.
