= Aliabad-e Abu ol Qasem Khani =

Village in Tehran province, Iran

Aliabad-e Abu ol Qasem Khani Persian: علي اباد ابوالقاسم خاني
- Village
- Location within Iran
- Coordinates: 35°21′30″N 51°53′51″E
- Country: Iran
- Province: Tehran
- County: Pakdasht
- District: Sharifabad
- Rural District: Sharifabad

Population (2016)
  - Total: 3,067
- Time zone: UTC+3:30 (IRST)

Aliabad-e Abu ol Qasem Khani (Persian: علي اباد ابوالقاسم خاني) (Note: Also romanized as ‘Alīābād-e Abū ol Qāsem Khānī; also known as ‘Aliābād, ‘Alīābād-e Kaleh ‘Omar, ‘Alīābād-e Kalleh ‘Omar, ‘Alīābād-e Mīrzā Abolqāsem Khānī, ‘Alīābād-e Mīrzā Abū ol Qāsemī, ‘Alīābād-e Qarā’ī, and Qarā’ī and Abū ol Qāsem Khānī) is a village in Sharifabad Rural District of Sharifabad District in Pakdasht County, Tehran province, Iran.

== Demographics ==
=== Population ===
At the time of the 2006 National Census, the village's population was 1,238 in 313 households. The following census in 2011 counted 2,142 people in 581 households. The 2016 census measured the population of the village as 3,067 people in 831 households. It was the most populous village in its rural district.
