= Qaleh Now-e Amlak =

Village in Tehran province, Iran

Qaleh Now-e Amlak Persian: قلعه نواملاك
- Village
- Location within Iran
- Coordinates: 35°28′04″N 51°36′02″E
- Country: Iran
- Province: Tehran
- County: Pakdasht
- District: Central
- Rural District: Ferunabad

Population (2016)
  - Total: 3,432
- Time zone: UTC+3:30 (IRST)

Qaleh Now-e Amlak (Persian: قلعه نواملاك) (Note: Also romanized as Qal‘eh Now-e Amlāk; also known as Qal‘eh Now) is a village in Ferunabad Rural District of the Central District in Pakdasht County, Tehran province, Iran.

== Demographics ==
=== Population ===
At the time of the 2006 National Census, the village's population was 1,851 in 442 households. The following census in 2011 counted 3,000 people in 801 households. The 2016 census measured the population of the village as 3,432 people in 955 households. It was the most populous village in its rural district.
