= Hesar-e Olya =

Hesar-e Olya or Hesar Olya (Persian: حصارعليا) may refer to:

- Hesar-e Olya, Tehran
- Hesar-e Olya, Zanjan

== See also ==
- Hesar-e Bala (disambiguation)
