= Qermez Tappeh =

Village in Tehran province, Iran

Qermez Tappeh Persian: قرمزتپه
- Village
- Location within Iran
- Coordinates: 35°22′14″N 51°52′39″E
- Country: Iran
- Province: Tehran
- County: Pakdasht
- District: Sharifabad
- Rural District: Sharifabad

Population (2016)
  - Total: 1,133
- Time zone: UTC+3:30 (IRST)

Qermez Tappeh (Persian: قرمزتپه) (Note: Also known as Qarmaz Tepe) is a village in Sharifabad Rural District of Sharifabad District in Pakdasht County, Tehran province, Iran.

== Demographics ==
=== Population ===
At the time of the 2006 National Census, the village's population was 1,195 in 309 households. The following census in 2011 counted 1,198 people in 342 households. The 2016 census measured the population of the village as 1,133 people in 341 households.
