= Golzar, Tehran =

Village in Tehran province, Iran

Golzar Persian: گلزار
- Village
- Location within Iran
- Coordinates: 35°27′04″N 51°42′32″E
- Country: Iran
- Province: Tehran
- County: Pakdasht
- District: Central
- Rural District: Filestan

Population (2016)
  - Total: 5,897
- Time zone: UTC+3:30 (IRST)

Golzar (Persian: گلزار) (Note: Also romanized as Golzār; formerly known as Hesar Kalak (حصار کلک)) is a village in Filestan Rural District of the Central District in Pakdasht County, Tehran province, Iran.

== Demographics ==
=== Population ===
At the time of the 2006 National Census, the village's population was 5,451 in 1,354 households. The following census in 2011 counted 5,573 people in 1,487 households. The 2016 census measured the population of the village as 5,897 people in 1,673 households. It was the most populous village in its rural district.
