= Heydarabad, Tehran =

Village in Tehran province, Iran

Heydarabad Persian: حيدراباد
- Village
- Location within Iran
- Coordinates: 35°21′53″N 51°47′50″E
- Country: Iran
- Province: Tehran
- County: Pakdasht
- District: Sharifabad
- Rural District: Karimabad

Population (2016)
  - Total: 248
- Time zone: UTC+3:30 (IRST)

Heydarabad (Persian: حيدراباد) (Note: Also romanized as Ḩeydarābād; also known as Haidarābād and Heydarābād-e Vasaţ) is a village in Karimabad Rural District (Note: Formerly Behnamsokhteh-e Shomali Rural District) of Sharifabad District in Pakdasht County, Tehran province, Iran.

== Demographics ==
=== Population ===
At the time of the 2006 National Census, the village's population was 322 in 71 households. The following census in 2011 counted 255 people in 67 households. The 2016 census measured the population of the village as 248 people in 73 households.
