= Hesarak =

Hesarak or Hisarak (Persian: حصارک, romanized: hesârak) may refer to:

== Afghanistan ==
- Hisarak District, Nangarhar Province
- Hesarak, Nangarhar, a village in the District

== Iran ==
- Hesarak (Karaj), Iran

== See also ==
- Hesar (disambiguation)
- Hissar (disambiguation)
