= Filestan Rural District =

Rural district in Tehran province, Iran

Filestan Rural District Persian: دهستان فيلستان
- Rural District
- Location within Iran
- Coordinates: 35°27′N 51°40′E
- Country: Iran
- Province: Tehran
- County: Pakdasht
- District: Central
- Established: 1987
- Capital: Filestan

Population (2016)
  - Total: 15,926
- Time zone: UTC+3:30 (IRST)

Filestan Rural District (Persian: دهستان فيلستان) is in the Central District of Pakdasht County, Tehran province, Iran. Its capital is the village of Filestan.

== Demographics ==
=== Population ===
At the time of the 2006 National Census, the rural district's population was 14,622 in 3,642 households. There were 16,147 inhabitants in 4,307 households in the following census of 2011. The 2016 census measured the population of the rural district as 15,926 in 4,439 households. The most populous of its seven villages was Golzar, with 5,897 people.

=== Other villages in the rural district ===
- Arambuiyeh
- Jitu
- Mahmudabad-e Khalaseh
