= Mandakan =

Village in Tehran province, Iran

Mandakan Persian: مندكان
- Village
- Location within Iran
- Coordinates: 35°20′14″N 51°50′47″E
- Country: Iran
- Province: Tehran
- County: Pakdasht
- District: Sharifabad
- Rural District: Karimabad

Population (2016)
  - Total: 286
- Time zone: UTC+3:30 (IRST)

Mandakan (Persian: مندكان) (Note: Also romanized as Mandakān and Mandekān; also known as Mandegān and Mūndakān) is a village in Karimabad Rural District (Note: Formerly Behnamsokhteh-e Shomali Rural District) of Sharifabad District in Pakdasht County, Tehran province, Iran.

== Demographics ==
=== Population ===
At the time of the 2006 National Census, the village's population was 344 in 84 households. The following census in 2011 counted 279 people in 75 households. The 2016 census measured the population of the village as 286 people in 81 households.
