= Kalin-e Khalaseh =

Village in Tehran province, Iran

Kalin-e Khalaseh Persian: كلين خالصه
- Village
- Location within Iran
- Coordinates: 35°23′55″N 51°46′51″E
- Country: Iran
- Province: Tehran
- County: Pakdasht
- District: Sharifabad
- Rural District: Karimabad

Population (2016)
  - Total: 2,147
- Time zone: UTC+3:30 (IRST)

Kalin-e Khalaseh (Persian: كلين خالصه) (Note: Also romanized as Kalīn-e Khālaṣeh; also known as Kalīn, Kalīn-e Bālā, and Kelīn-e Bālā) is a village in Karimabad Rural District (Note: Formerly Behnamsokhteh-e Shomali Rural District) of Sharifabad District in Pakdasht County, Tehran province, Iran.

== Demographics ==
=== Population ===
At the time of the 2006 National Census, the village's population was 2,113 in 523 households. The following census in 2011 counted 1,903 people in 507 households. The 2016 census measured the population of the village as 2,147 people in 610 households.
