= Shahrak-e Siah Cheshmeh va Menatul =

Village in Tehran province, Iran

Shahrak-e Siah Cheshmeh va Menatul Persian: شهرک سیاه چشمه و مناطول
- Village
- Location within Iran
- Coordinates: 35°25′58″N 51°49′18″E
- Country: Iran
- Province: Tehran
- County: Pakdasht
- District: Sharifabad
- Rural District: Sharifabad

Population (2016)
  - Total: 414
- Time zone: UTC+3:30 (IRST)

Shahrak-e Siah Cheshmeh va Menatul (Persian: شهرک سیاه چشمه و مناطول) (Note: Also romanized as Shahrak-e Sīāh Cheshmeh va Menāṭūl; also known as Sīāh Chashmeh and Sīāh Cheshmeh) is a village in Sharifabad Rural District of Sharifabad District in Pakdasht County, Tehran province, Iran.

== Demographics ==
=== Population ===
At the time of the 2006 National Census, the village's population was 303 in 74 households. The following census in 2011 counted 364 people in 98 households. The 2016 census measured the population of the village as 414 people in 126 households.
