= Siah Cheshmeh (disambiguation) =

Siah Cheshmeh is a city in West Azerbaijan Province, Iran.

Siah Cheshmeh or Siah Chashmeh (Persian: سيه چشمه) may also refer to:

- Siah Cheshmeh, Lorestan
- Siah Cheshmeh, Tehran
