= Kalin (surname) =

Kalin is a surname. Notable people with the surname include:

- Jacqui Kalin (born 1989), American-Israeli professional basketball player
- Tom Kalin (born 1962), award-winning screenwriter, film director and producer.
- Boris Kalin (1905–1975), Slovene sculptor
- Andrea Kalin, documentary director, producer and the founder and executive producer of Spark Media
- Frank Kalin (1917–1975), Major League Baseball outfielder
- Jeremy Kalin (born 1975), Minnesota politician and a member of the Minnesota House of Representatives
- Yngve Kalin (born 1950), Swedish priest and one of the leaders of the traditionalist movement in the Church of Sweden
- The Kalin Twins, recording duo who had 1958 hit "When"

== See also ==
- Kalin (disambiguation)
- Kälin (surname)
- Kali (name)
