= Kälin =

Kälin or Kaelin is a surname, and may refer to:

- Alfred Kälin (born 1949), Swiss cross country skier
- Alois Kälin (born 1939), Swiss Nordic skier
- Annik Kälin (born 2000), Swiss athlete
- Barbara Marty Kälin (1954–2022), Swiss politician
- Bernard Kälin (1887–1962) Swiss Benedictine monk
- Carolyn Kaelin (1961–2015), American surgeon
- Charles S. Kaelin (1858–1929), American painter
- Christian Kälin (born 1971), Swiss lawyer and businessman
- Franz Kälin (born 1939), Swiss cross-country skier
- Irène Kälin (born 1987), Swiss politician of the Green Party
- Karl Kälin (1943–2023), Swiss psychologist
- Karl Kälin (priest) (1870–1950), Swiss Jesuit priest, translator, and writer
- Kato Kaelin (born 1959), American actor
- Nadja Kälin (born 2001), Swiss cross-country skier
- Sandra Kälin (born 1971), Swiss football manager and former footballer
- Stefan Kälin (born 1942), Swiss alpine skier
- Urs Kälin (born 1966), Swiss alpine skier
- Walter Kälin (born 1951), Swiss humanitarian and lawyer
- William Kaelin Jr. (born 1957), American Nobel laureate and professor of medicine

== See also ==
- Kalin (disambiguation)
