= Hesar Mehtar, Pakdasht =

Hesar Mehtar حصارمهتر
- Village
- Location within Iran
- Coordinates: 35°21′04″N 51°49′13″E
- Country: Iran
- Province: Tehran
- County: Pakdasht
- Bakhsh: Sharifabad
- Rural District: Karimabad

Population (2006)
  - Total: 226
- Time zone: UTC+3:30 (IRST)
  - Summer (DST): UTC+4:30 (IRDT)

Hesar Mehtar (Persian: حصارمهتر, also Romanized as Ḩeşār Mehtar; also known as Ḩeşār) is a village in Karimabad Rural District, Sharifabad District, Pakdasht County, Tehran Province, Iran. At the 2006 census, its population was 226, in 57 families.
