= Afarin, Pakdasht =

Village in Tehran province, Iran

Afarin Persian: افرين
- Village
- Location within Iran
- Coordinates: 35°23′30″N 51°49′54″E
- Country: Iran
- Province: Tehran
- County: Pakdasht
- District: Sharifabad
- Rural District: Sharifabad

Population (2016)
  - Total: 472
- Time zone: UTC+3:30 (IRST)

Afarin (Persian: افرين) (Note: Also romanized as Āfarīn; also known as Qeshlāq-e Āfarīn) is a village in Sharifabad Rural District of Sharifabad District in Pakdasht County, Tehran province, Iran.

== Demographics ==
=== Population ===
At the time of the 2006 National Census, the village's population was 705 in 170 households. The following census in 2011 counted 576 people in 161 households. The 2016 census measured the population of the village as 472 people in 131 households.
