= Hesar-e Sefid =

Hesar-e Sefid or Hesar Sefid (Persian: حصارسفيد) may refer to:

- Hesar-e Sefid, Kermanshah
- Hesar Sefid, Kurdistan
