= Owzan Darreh, Damavand =

Village in Tehran province, Iran

Owzan Darreh Persian: اوزن دره
- Village
- Location within Iran
- Coordinates: 35°39′46.59″N 52°02′26.67″E
- Country: Iran
- Province: Tehran
- County: Damavand
- District: Central
- Rural District: Tarrud

Population (2016)
  - Total: 25
- Time zone: UTC+3:30 (IRST)

Owzan Darreh (Persian: اوزن دره) is a village in Tarrud Rural District of the Central District in Damavand County, Tehran province, Iran.

== Demographics ==
=== Population ===
The Village was uninhabited in the 2006 census results. In the 2011 census its population was 22 people in six households. The 2016 census measured the population of the village as 25 people in eight households.
