= Kalin-e Sadat =

Village in Tehran province, Iran

Kalin-e Sadat Persian: كلين سادات
- Village
- Location within Iran
- Coordinates: 35°23′42″N 51°46′56″E
- Country: Iran
- Province: Tehran
- County: Pakdasht
- District: Sharifabad
- Rural District: Karimabad

Population (2016)
  - Total: 383
- Time zone: UTC+3:30 (IRST)

Kalin-e Sadat (Persian: كلين سادات (قلعه سادات )) (Note: Also romanized as Kalīn-e Sādāt; also known as Kalīn-e Pā’īn and Qal‘eh-ye Sādāt (قلعه سادات)) is a village in Karimabad Rural District (Note: Formerly Behnamsokhteh-e Shomali Rural District) of Sharifabad District in Pakdasht County, Tehran province, Iran.

== Demographics ==
=== Population ===
At the time of the 2006 National Census, the village's population was 546 in 125 households. The following census in 2011 counted 437 people in 95 households. The 2016 census measured the population of the village as 383 people in 87 households.
