= Mandekan =

Mandekan may refer to:

- Mande languages
- Mandakan, a village in Iran
