= Hesar-e Bala =

Hesar-e Bala or Hisar Bala or Hesar Bala (Persian: حصاربالا) may refer to:

- Hesar-e Bala, Damavand, Tehran Province
- Hesar-e Bala, Varamin, Tehran Province
- Hesar-e Bala, Zanjan

== See also ==
- Hesar-e Olya (disambiguation)
