= Hesar Mehtar =

Hesar Mehtar (Persian: حصارمهتر) may refer to:

- Hesar Mehtar, Pakdasht
- Hesar Mehtar, Robat Karim
