= Chenar-e Arabha =

Village in Tehran province, Iran

Chenar-e Arabha Persian: چنارعربها
- Village
- Location within Iran
- Coordinates: 35°41′56″N 52°06′25″E
- Country: Iran
- Province: Tehran
- County: Damavand
- District: Central
- Rural District: Tarrud

Population (2016)
  - Total: 740
- Time zone: UTC+3:30 (IRST)

Chenar-e Arabha (Persian: چنارعربها) (Note: Also romanized as Chenār-e 'Arabhā; also known as Chenar-e Sharq (چنار شرق)) is a village in Tarrud Rural District of the Central District in Damavand County, Tehran province, Iran.

== Demographics ==
=== Population ===
At the time of the 2006 National Census, the village's population was 330 in 93 households. The following census in 2011 counted 256 people in 80 households. The 2016 census measured the population of the village as 740 people in 230 households.
