= Hesar-e Amir Rural District =

Rural district in Tehran province, Iran

Hesar-e Amir Rural District Persian: دهستان حصارامير
- Rural District
- Location within Iran
- Coordinates: 35°33′N 51°46′E
- Country: Iran
- Province: Tehran
- County: Pakdasht
- District: Central
- Established: 1987

Population (2016)
  - Total: 6,465
- Time zone: UTC+3:30 (IRST)

Hesar-e Amir Rural District (Persian: دهستان حصارامير) (Note: Formerly Behnampazuki-ye Shomali Rural District (دهستان بهنام پازوكي شمالي)) is in the Central District of Pakdasht County, Tehran province, Iran. Its former capital is the village of Hesar-e Amir.

== Demographics ==
=== Population ===
At the time of the 2006 National Census, the rural district's population was 45,082 in 11,125 households. There were 6,659 inhabitants in 1,894 households at the following census of 2011. The 2016 census measured the population of the rural district as 6,465 in 2,044 households. The most populous of its 11 villages was Changi, with 2,015 people.

=== Other villages in the rural district ===
- Hamamak
- Neyak
- Parchin
- Towchal
