= Mara, Iran =

Village in Tehran province, Iran

Mara Persian: مراء
- Village
- Location within Iran
- Coordinates: 35°39′04″N 52°00′59″E
- Country: Iran
- Province: Tehran
- County: Damavand
- District: Central
- Rural District: Tarrud
- Elevation: 1,700–1,800 m (5,600–5,900 ft)

Population (2016)
  - Total: 1,081
- Time zone: UTC+3:30 (IRST)

Mara (Persian: مراء) (Note: Also romanized as Marā’) is a village in, and the capital of, Tarrud Rural District in the Central District of Damavand County, Tehran province, Iran.

== Demographics ==
=== Population ===
At the time of the 2006 National Census, the village's population was 815 in 238 households. The following census in 2011 counted 855 people in 247 households. The 2016 census measured the population of the village as 1,081 people in 359 households. It was the most populous village in its rural district.
