= Ferunabad Rural District =

Rural district in Tehran province, Iran

Ferunabad Rural District Persian: دهستان فرون آباد
- Rural District
- Location within Iran
- Coordinates: 35°30′N 51°37′E
- Country: Iran
- Province: Tehran
- County: Pakdasht
- District: Central
- Established: 1997
- Capital: Ferunabad

Population (2016)
  - Total: 6,136
- Time zone: UTC+3:30 (IRST)

Ferunabad Rural District (Persian: دهستان فرون آباد) is in the Central District of Pakdasht County, Tehran province, Iran. It is administered from the city of Ferunabad.

== Demographics ==
=== Population ===
At the time of the 2006 National Census, the rural district's population was 17,065 in 4,084 households. There were 5,723 inhabitants in 1,510 households at the following census of 2011. The 2016 census measured the population of the rural district as 6,136 in 1,711 households. The most populous of its six villages was Qaleh Now-e Amlak, with 3,432 people.

=== Other villages in the rural district ===
- Hajjiabad-e Amlak
- Qeshlaq-e Ferunabad
- Qeshlaq-e Hajjiabad
- Qeshlaq-e Qaleh Now-e Amlak
