= Eslamabad, Damavand =

Village in Tehran province, Iran

Eslamabad Persian: اسلام اباد
- Village
- Location within Iran
- Coordinates: 35°39′51″N 52°04′54″E
- Country: Iran
- Province: Tehran
- County: Damavand
- District: Central
- Rural District: Tarrud

Population (2016)
  - Total: 899
- Time zone: UTC+3:30 (IRST)

Eslamabad (Persian: اسلام اباد) (Note: Also romanized as Eslāmābād) is a village in Tarrud Rural District of the Central District in Damavand County, Tehran province, Iran.

== Demographics ==
=== Population ===
At the time of the 2006 National Census, the village's population was 457 in 114 households. The following census in 2011 counted 516 people in 138 households. The 2016 census measured the population of the village as 899 people in 245 households.
