= Ferunabad =

City in Tehran province, Iran

Ferunabad Persian: فرون اباد
- City
- Location within Iran
- Coordinates: 35°30′50″N 51°37′11″E
- Country: Iran
- Province: Tehran
- County: Pakdasht
- District: Central
- Established as a city: 2010

Population (2016)
  - Total: 21,682
- Time zone: UTC+3:30 (IRST)

Ferunabad (Persian: فرون اباد) (Note: Also romanized as Farvānābād, Ferūnābād, Forunābād, and Froonābād; also known as Farenābād, Farnābād, Fir‘aunābād, and Firīnīābād) is a city in the Central District of Pakdasht County, Tehran province, Iran, serving as the administrative center for Ferunabad Rural District.

== Demographics ==
=== Population ===
At the time of the 2006 National Census, Ferunabad's population was 12,632 in 3,027 households, when it was a village in Ferunabad Rural District. The following census in 2011 counted 14,437 people in 3,933 households, by which time the village had been elevated to the status of a city. The 2016 census measured the population of the city as 21,682 people in 6,372 households.
