= Hesar-e Bahram Khan =

Hesar-e Bahram Khan حصاربهرام خان
- Village
- Location within Iran
- Coordinates: 37°42′15″N 45°00′54″E
- Country: Iran
- Province: West Azerbaijan
- County: Urmia
- Bakhsh: Nazlu
- Rural District: Nazlu-e Shomali

Population (2006)
  - Total: 262
- Time zone: UTC+3:30 (IRST)
  - Summer (DST): UTC+4:30 (IRDT)

Hesar-e Bahram Khan (Persian: حصاربهرام خان, also Romanized as Ḩeşār-e Bahrām Khān and Ḩeşār-e Bahrāmkhān) is a village in Nazlu-e Shomali Rural District, Nazlu District, Urmia County, West Azerbaijan Province, Iran. At the 2006 census, its population was 262, in 65 families.
