= Hesar-e Honameh =

Hesar-e Honameh حصارهنامه
- Village
- Country: Iran
- Province: North Khorasan
- County: Shirvan
- Bakhsh: Central
- Rural District: Sivkanlu

Population (2006)
  - Total: 154
- Time zone: UTC+3:30 (IRST)
  - Summer (DST): UTC+4:30 (IRDT)

Hesar-e Honameh (Persian: حصارهنامه, also Romanized as Ḩeşār-e Honāmeh) is a village in Sivkanlu Rural District, in the Central District of Shirvan County, North Khorasan Province, Iran. At the 2006 census, its population was 154, in 38 families.
