= Hesar-e Hajjilar =

Hesar-e Hajjilar حصارحاجي لار
- Village
- Location within Iran
- Coordinates: 37°32′56″N 45°15′19″E
- Country: Iran
- Province: West Azerbaijan
- County: Urmia
- Bakhsh: Central
- Rural District: Bakeshluchay

Population (2006)
  - Total: 447
- Time zone: UTC+3:30 (IRST)
  - Summer (DST): UTC+4:30 (IRDT)

Hesar-e Hajjilar (Persian: حصارحاجي لار, also Romanized as Ḩeşār-e Ḩājjīlār and Ḩeşār-e Ḩājjīlar) is a village in Bakeshluchay Rural District, in the Central District of Urmia County, West Azerbaijan Province, Iran. At the 2006 census, its population was 447, in 134 families.
