= Hesar-e Kordha =

Hesar-e Kordha حصاركردها
- Village
- Location within Iran
- Coordinates: 37°09′12″N 57°17′59″E
- Country: Iran
- Province: North Khorasan
- County: Esfarayen
- Bakhsh: Central
- Rural District: Ruin

Population (2006)
  - Total: 157
- Time zone: UTC+3:30 (IRST)
  - Summer (DST): UTC+4:30 (IRDT)

Hesar-e Kordha (Persian: حصاركردها, also Romanized as Ḩeşār-e Kordhā; also known as Ḩeşār and Hisār) is a village in Ruin Rural District, in the Central District of Esfarayen County, North Khorasan Province, Iran. At the 2006 census, its population was 157, in 30 families.
