= Afarin Sajedi =

Iranian painter (born 1979)

- آفرين ساجدي
- Born: December 17, 1979 (age 46); Shiraz, Iran
- Education: Islamic Azad University, Central Tehran Branch
- Occupations: Painter, illustrator
- Style: Figurative art, Surrealist art
- Website: https://afarinsajedi.com/

Afarin Sajedi (Persian: آفرين ساجدي; born 1979) is an Iranian painter and illustrator, from Shiraz. Her paintings are predominantly figurative and feature women merged with a variety of animals or objects. Her works have been exhibited frequently in Iran, London, and Italy.

== Early life ==
Sajedi was born in 1979 in Shiraz, Iran. She has been drawing since childhood, and her family taught her about the Italian Renaissance at a young age. She graduated from Islamic Azad University, Central Tehran Branch in 2004 with a degree in graphic design, with a background in animation and illustration.

== Artistic style and influences ==
Sajedi's art is characterized by surreal and theatrical qualities. Her art often depicts women with expressive features and symbolic elements. Her work is influenced from Japanese theater, Western religious art, and pop surrealism. She is also inspired by filmmakers like David Lynch and Stanley Kubrick, giving her pieces a cinematic narrative quality.

Anya Tchoupakov of Vice magazine described Sajedi's works as "mostly of women, taking on different faces, thrust into various roles, merging into animals, objects, and each other." Her portraits often feature women in elaborate costumes and with symbolic objects, such as fish, which she uses to convey themes of freedom and introspection. Sajedi has stated that she tries to capture human presence and issues within her works, and that her sources of inspiration include symbolist painter Gustav Klimt, Heinrich Boll's The Clown, as well as paintings of humans from the Renaissance.

== Career ==
Between 2001 and 2012, Sajedi showcased works in several solo and group exhibits in Iran. In 2012, Sajedi had her first international showing at Palazzo Valentini in Rome in a Dorothy Circus Gallery group exhibit titled "Inside Her Eyes." The following year, Sajedi exhibited again in Rome at the Dorothy Circus Gallery in a four-person exhibit titled "God is Her Deejay." She also exhibited at the Flower Pepper Gallery in Pasadena, California, and the Žitný Ostrov Múzeum in Slovakia.

In 2015, Sajedi was invited by Cité internationale des arts in Paris for a three-month residency. She also hosted a solo exhibition, "The Unseen", at Etemed Gallery in Tehran. From April 16 to May 30, 2016, Sajedi exhibited at Dorothy Circus Gallery in Rome once again in a solo exhibit titled "Illusion." Her installation "The Unseen" was featured at the Venice Biennale in 2017, receiving critical acclaim for its commentary on Iranian culture and history. In 2019, Sajedi had another solo exhibition again with Dorothy Circus Gallery in London.

In 2020, during the COVID-19 pandemic, fans from a number of countries posted photos of themselves dressed as Sajedi's paintings. In a Shargh Daily interview, Sajedi mentioned that several museums had challenged people to recreate artworks in real life, and gradually she found more and more people sharing recreations of her work on Facebook and Instagram. From July 30 to September 18, Sajedi was part of Dorothy Circus Gallery's "House of the Rising Light" group exhibition of 42 artists from Asia. In 2023, Sajedi returned to Dorothy Circus Gallery in Rome to showcase a solo exhibition, "Bon Appétit" from October 13th to November 10th, described by Collateral Magazine as a "feast of flowers, meat, fish, wine and champagne, serving as powerful metaphors for the transience of life."
