= Tarrud Rural District =

Rural district in Tehran province, Iran

Tarrud Rural District Persian: دهستان تاررود
- Rural District
- Location within Iran
- Coordinates: 35°38′N 52°01′E
- Country: Iran
- Province: Tehran
- County: Damavand
- District: Central
- Capital: Mara

Population (2016)
  - Total: 6,263
- Time zone: UTC+3:30 (IRST)

Tarrud Rural District (Persian: دهستان تاررود) is in the Central District of Damavand County, Tehran province, Iran. Its capital is the village of Mara.

== Demographics ==
=== Population ===
At the time of the 2006 National Census, the rural district's population was 5,661 in 1,586 households. There were 5,491 inhabitants in 1,587 households at the following census of 2011. The 2016 census measured the population of the rural district as 6,263 in 1,948 households. The most populous of its 34 villages was Mara, with 1,081 people.

=== Other villages in the rural district ===
- Chenar-e Arabha
- Eslamabad
- Hesar-e Bala
- Hesar-e Pain
- Kal Dasht-e Abu Talebi
- Kal Dasht-e Pain
