= Sharifabad Rural District (Pakdasht County) =

Rural district in Tehran province, Iran

Sharifabad Rural District Persian: دهستان شريف آباد
- Rural District
- Location within Iran
- Coordinates: 35°25′N 51°52′E
- Country: Iran
- Province: Tehran
- County: Pakdasht
- District: Sharifabad
- Established: 1997
- Capital: Sharifabad

Population (2016)
  - Total: 9,362
- Time zone: UTC+3:30 (IRST)

Sharifabad Rural District (Persian: دهستان شريف آباد) is in Sharifabad District of Pakdasht County, Tehran province, Iran. It is administered from the city of Sharifabad.

== Demographics ==
=== Population ===
At the time of the 2006 National Census, the rural district's population was 8,878 in 2,368 households. There were 9,250 inhabitants in 2,662 households at the following census of 2011. The 2016 census measured the population of the rural district as 9,362 in 2,638 households. The most populous of its 16 villages was Aliabad-e Abu ol Qasem Khani, with 3,067 people.

=== Other villages in the rural district ===
- Abdolabad
- Afarin
- Ebrahimabad
- Qaleh-ye Abdolabad
- Qermez Tappeh
- Shahrak-e Siah Cheshmeh va Menatul
- Sherkat-e Mahan Rah
