= Kal Dasht-e Abu Talebi =

Village in Tehran province, Iran

Kal Dasht-e Abu Talebi Persian: کالدشت بالا Persian: كالدشت ابوطالبی
- Village
- Location within Iran
- Coordinates: 35°40′27″N 52°03′07″E
- Country: Iran
- Province: Tehran
- County: Damavand
- District: Central
- Rural District: Tarrud
- Elevation: 1,850 m (6,070 ft)

Population (2016)
  - Total: 334
- Time zone: UTC+3:30 (IRST)

Kal Dasht-e Abu Talebi (Persian: كالدشت ابوطالبی) (Note: Also romanized as Kāl Dasht-e Ābū Tālebī; also known as Kāl Dasht-e Bālā and Kalā Dasht) is a village in Tarrud Rural District of the Central District in Damavand County, Tehran province, Iran.

== Demographics ==
=== Population ===
At the time of the 2006 National Census, the village's population was 737 in 206 households. The following census in 2011 counted 723 people in 202 households. The 2016 census measured the population of the village as 334 people in 102 households.
