= Kal Dasht-e Pain =

Village in Tehran province, Iran

Kal Dasht-e Pain Persian: کالدشت پايين
- Village
- Location within Iran
- Coordinates: 35°40′28″N 52°02′43″E
- Country: Iran
- Province: Tehran
- County: Damavand
- District: Central
- Rural District: Tarrud

Population (2016)
  - Total: 453
- Time zone: UTC+3:30 (IRST)

Kal Dasht-e Pain (Persian: کالدشت پايين) (Note: Also romanized as Kāl Dasht-e Pā’īn; also known as Gol Dasht and Kal Dasht-e Taraqi (كالدشت ترقي), also romanized as Kāl Dasht-e Taraqī) is a village in Tarrud Rural District of the Central District in Damavand County, Tehran province, Iran.

== Demographics ==
=== Population ===
At the time of the 2006 National Census, the village's population was 22 in seven households. The village did not appear in the following census of 2011. The 2016 census measured the population of the village as 453 people in 130 households. Kal Dasht-e Taraqi had a population of 37 people in 12 households in that census.
