= Kalin (Tamil origin name) =

Kalin (கலின்) is a Tamil origin name derived from "கலி" which means flourishing, thriving and prospering.

It is also inspired from:

- Tamil grammar written in kalippa (கலி-ப்பா)
- Kalithokai (கலி-த்தொகை) in ancient Tamil Sangam literature Ettuthokai
- A type of Venpa (கலிவெண்பா) in classical Tamil poetry

The female version of Kalin is Kalini.
