= Karl Kälin =

Karl Kälin (7 June 1943 – 11 January 2023) was a Swiss Psychologist.

== Life ==
Karl Kälin was born in Switzerland. He obtained his PhD in psychology form the University of Zurich. He wrote several books on leadership and personnel development. His most successful books were Sich und andere führen which was co-authored by Peter Müri and Topschrott co-authored by Rolf Fink. Topschrott was a bestseller in Germany and Switzerland. Furthermore, he developed the HR-Process Amexel/Xelex together with Rolf Fink. Amexel is based on systems theory and humanistic psychology.

== Works ==
- Karl Kälin: Populationsdichte und soziales Verhalten. Lang, Bern 1972.
- Karl Kälin, Peter Müri: Sich und andere führen: Psychologie für Führungskräfte. Ott, Thun 1987, ISBN 3-7225-6642-8.
- Karl Kälin, Peter Müri (Hrsg.): Führen mit Kopf und Herz. Ott, Thun 1988, ISBN 3-7225-6643-6 (Psychologie für Führungskräfte und Mitarbeiter. Bd. 2).
- Karl Kälin (Hrsg.) Captain oder Coach? Neue Wege im Management Ott, Thun 1995, ISBN 3-7225-6661-4.
- Karl Kälin, Elisabeth Michel-Alder und Silvia Schmid: Sich selbst managen: Die eigene Entwicklung im beruflichen und privaten Umfeld gestalten. Ott, Thun 1998, ISBN 3-7225-6680-0.
- Rolf Fink, Karl Kälin: Topschrott: Unwahres und Falsches zu Führung und Management. Orell Füssli, Zürich 2002, ISBN 3-280-05003-0.
