= Hesar-e Khuni =

Hesar-e Khuni حصارخوني
- Village
- Location within Iran
- Coordinates: 36°14′59″N 58°43′31″E
- Country: Iran
- Province: Razavi Khorasan
- County: Nishapur
- Bakhsh: Central
- Rural District: Mazul

Population (2006)
  - Total: 220
- Time zone: UTC+3:30 (IRST)
  - Summer (DST): UTC+4:30 (IRDT)

Hesar-e Khuni (Persian: حصارخوني, also Romanized as Ḩeşār-e Khūnī; also known as Ḩeşār-e Gol) is a village in Mazul Rural District, in the Central District of Nishapur County, Razavi Khorasan Province, Iran. At the 2006 census, its population was 220, in 60 families.
