= Hesar-e Bala, Damavand =

Village in Tehran province, Iran

Hesar-e Bala Persian: حصاربالا
- Village
- Location within Iran
- Coordinates: 35°40′32″N 52°02′18″E
- Country: Iran
- Province: Tehran
- County: Damavand
- District: Central
- Rural District: Tarrud
- Elevation: 1,860 m (6,100 ft)

Population (2016)
  - Total: 506
- Time zone: UTC+3:30 (IRST)

Hesar-e Bala (Persian: حصاربالا) (Note: Also romanized as Ḩeşār-e Bālā; also known as Hisār Bāla) is a village in Tarrud Rural District of the Central District in Damavand County, Tehran province, Iran.

== Demographics ==
=== Population ===
At the time of the 2006 National Census, the village's population was 695 in 175 households. The following census in 2011 counted 534 people in 139 households. The 2016 census measured the population of the village as 506 people in 144 households.
