= Hesar-e Gapuchi =

Hesar-e Gapuchi حصار گاپوچی
- Village
- Location within Iran
- Coordinates: 37°29′45″N 45°12′13″E
- Country: Iran
- Province: West Azerbaijan
- County: Urmia
- Bakhsh: Central
- Rural District: Torkaman

Population (2006)
  - Total: 77
- Time zone: UTC+3:30 (IRST)
  - Summer (DST): UTC+4:30 (IRDT)

Hesar-e Gapuchi (Persian: حصار گاپوچی, also Romanized as Ḩeşār-e Gāpūchī; also known as Ḩeşār-e Qāpūchī) is a village in Torkaman Rural District, in the Central District of Urmia County, West Azerbaijan Province, Iran. At the 2006 census, its population was 77, in 17 families.

Hesar-e Gapuchi is located about 1.31 kilometres (0.81 miles) northeast off Road 11, and about 13.4 kilometres (8.3 miles) southeast from the city of Urmia.
