= Hesari-ye Gazerani =

Hesari-ye Gazerani حصاری گازرانی
- Village
- Location within Iran
- Coordinates: 36°55′05″N 57°41′45″E
- Country: Iran
- Province: North Khorasan
- County: Esfarayen
- Bakhsh: Central
- Rural District: Azari

Population (2006)
  - Total: 381
- Time zone: UTC+3:30 (IRST)
  - Summer (DST): UTC+4:30 (IRDT)

Hesari-ye Gazerani (Persian: حصاری گازرانی, also Romanized as Ḩeşārī-ye Gāzerānī; also known as Ḩeşārī and Ḩeşār) is a village in Azari Rural District, in the Central District of Esfarayen County, North Khorasan Province, Iran. At the 2006 census, its population was 381, in 98 families.
