= Hesar Dar =

Hesar Dar حصاردار
- Village
- Location within Iran
- Coordinates: 32°19′46″N 58°50′43″E
- Country: Iran
- Province: South Khorasan
- County: Khusf
- Bakhsh: Jolgeh-e Mazhan
- Rural District: Qaleh Zari

Population (2006)
  - Total: 40
- Time zone: UTC+3:30 (IRST)
  - Summer (DST): UTC+4:30 (IRDT)

Hesar Dar (Persian: حصاردار, also Romanized as Ḩeşār Dār and Hassārdār) is a village in Qaleh Zari Rural District, Jolgeh-e Mazhan District, Khusf County, South Khorasan Province, Iran. At the 2006 census, its population was 40, in 9 families.
