= Hesarak, Nangarhar =

Location in Nangarhar Province, Afghanistan

Hesarak حصارك
- Location in Afghanistan
- Coordinates: 34°12′53″N 70°30′10″E
- Country: Afghanistan
- Province: Nangarhar Province
- District: Hesarak District حصارک ولسوالی ډیر ښایسته غرونه، سیندونه او د سیاحت ښایسته ځایونه لري لکه د ناور دره چې ډیره په زړه پورې دی
- Time zone: UTC+4:30

Hisarak or Hesarak (Pashto: حصارك) is the center of Hesarak District, Afghanistan.

== See also ==
- Nangarhar Province
- Idrees jabarkhil
