= Hesar, Sarab =

Hesar حصار
- Village
- Location within Iran
- Coordinates: 37°53′22″N 47°30′49″E
- Country: Iran
- Province: East Azerbaijan
- County: Sarab
- Bakhsh: Central
- Rural District: Howmeh

Population (2006)
  - Total: 448
- Time zone: UTC+3:30 (IRST)
  - Summer (DST): UTC+4:30 (IRDT)

Hesar (Persian: حصار, also Romanized as Ḩeşār) is a village in Howmeh Rural District, in the Central District of Sarab County, East Azerbaijan Province, Iran. At the 2006 census, its population was 448, in 96 families.
