= Hesar-e Torkaman =

Hesar-e Torkaman حصارتركمان
- Village
- Location within Iran
- Coordinates: 37°26′34″N 45°13′08″E
- Country: Iran
- Province: West Azerbaijan
- County: Urmia
- Bakhsh: Central
- Rural District: Torkaman

Population (2006)
  - Total: 243
- Time zone: UTC+3:30 (IRST)
  - Summer (DST): UTC+4:30 (IRDT)

Hesar-e Torkaman (Persian: حصارتركمان, also Romanized as Ḩeşār-e Torkamān) is a village in Torkaman Rural District, in the Central District of Urmia County, West Azerbaijan Province, Iran. At the 2006 census, its population was 243, in 57 families.
