= Jamalabad Rural District (Pakdasht County) =

Rural district in Tehran province, Iran

Jamalabad Rural District Persian: دهستان جمال آباد
- Rural District
- Location within Iran
- Coordinates: 35°26′N 51°43′E
- Country: Iran
- Province: Tehran
- County: Pakdasht
- District: Sharifabad
- Established: 1997
- Capital: Jamalabad

Population (2016)
  - Total: 29,684
- Time zone: UTC+3:30 (IRST)

Jamalabad Rural District (Persian: دهستان جمال آباد) is in Sharifabad District of Pakdasht County, Tehran province, Iran. Its capital is the village of Jamalabad.

== Demographics ==
=== Population ===
At the time of the 2006 National Census, the rural district's population was 12,718 in 3,361 households. There were 13,426 inhabitants in 3,654 households at the following census of 2011. The 2016 census measured the population of the rural district as 29,684 in 8,737 households. The most populous of its seven villages was Mojtame-e Shahid Namju, with 22,990 people.

=== Other villages in the rural district ===
- Abbasabad
- Aluyak
- Hoseynabad-e Qajar
- Kabud Gonbad
