= Karl Kälin (priest) =

Karl Kälin or Carl Kälin (Einsiedeln, 5 May 1870-Basel, 1 January 1950) was a Swiss Jesuit priest, translator and writer.

== Life ==
His father was the writer Eduard Kälin.

He was ordained a priest in 1901, and served in several parishes in Switzerland. He was also an editor in the magazine Die katholischen Missionen.

== Works ==
- In den Zelten des Mahdi, 1904
- Der Sieger aus Futuna, 1926
