= Hesar-e Olya, Tehran =

Hesar-e Olya حصارعليا
- Village
- Location within Iran
- Coordinates: 35°11′21″N 51°44′51″E
- Country: Iran
- Province: Tehran
- County: Varamin
- Bakhsh: Javadabad
- Rural District: Behnamarab-e Jonubi

Population (2006)
  - Total: 145
- Time zone: UTC+3:30 (IRST)
  - Summer (DST): UTC+4:30 (IRDT)

Hesar-e Olya (Persian: حصارعليا, also Romanized as Ḩeşār-e ‘Olyā, Ḩeşār-e Owlyā, and Ḩeşār-e Owlīā; also known as ‘Olyā’ and Owlīā’) is a village in Behnamarab-e Jonubi Rural District, Javadabad District, Varamin County, Tehran Province, Iran. At the 2006 census, its population was 145, in 35 families.
