= Hesarak District =

Coordinates: 34.2934°N 69.7667°E

Hesarak District حصارک
- District
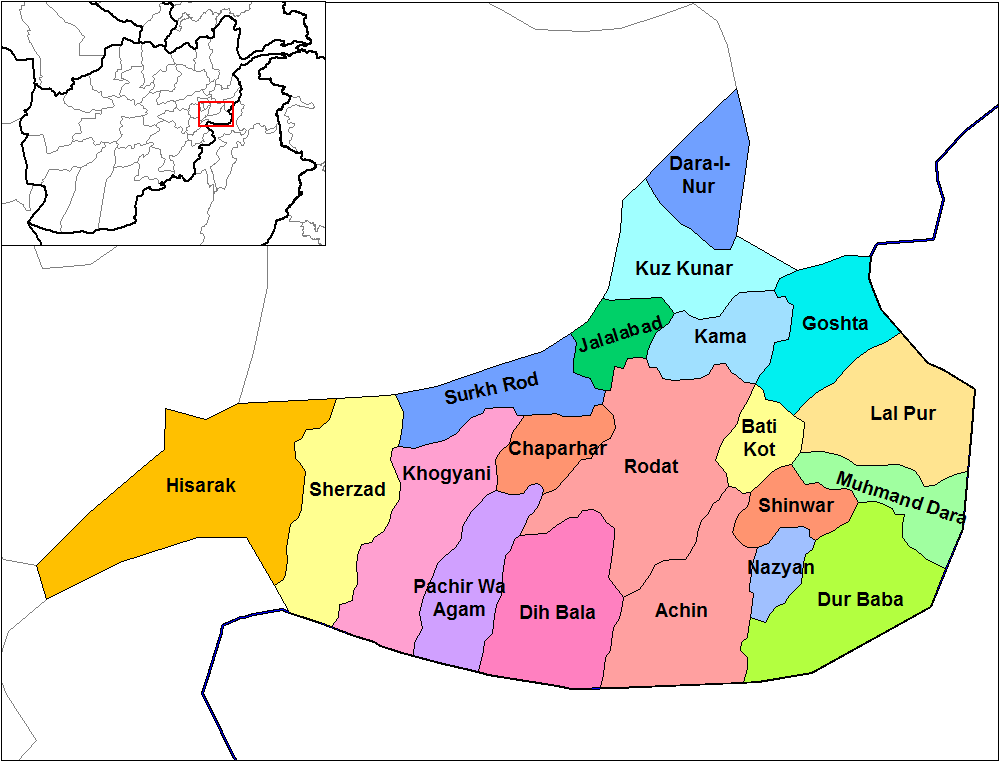
- Hesarak District, Nangarhar Province
- Country: Afghanistan
- Province: Nangarhar Province
- Capital: Hesarak

Population (2002)
  - Total: 28,462
- Time zone: UTC+4:30 (Afghanistan Standard Time)

Hesarak or Hisarak (Pashto: حصارک) is a district in the west of Nangarhar Province, Afghanistan. Its population was estimated at 28,462 in 2002. The district centre is the village of Hesarak.
