= Hisar Mosque =

Mosque in İzmir, Turkey

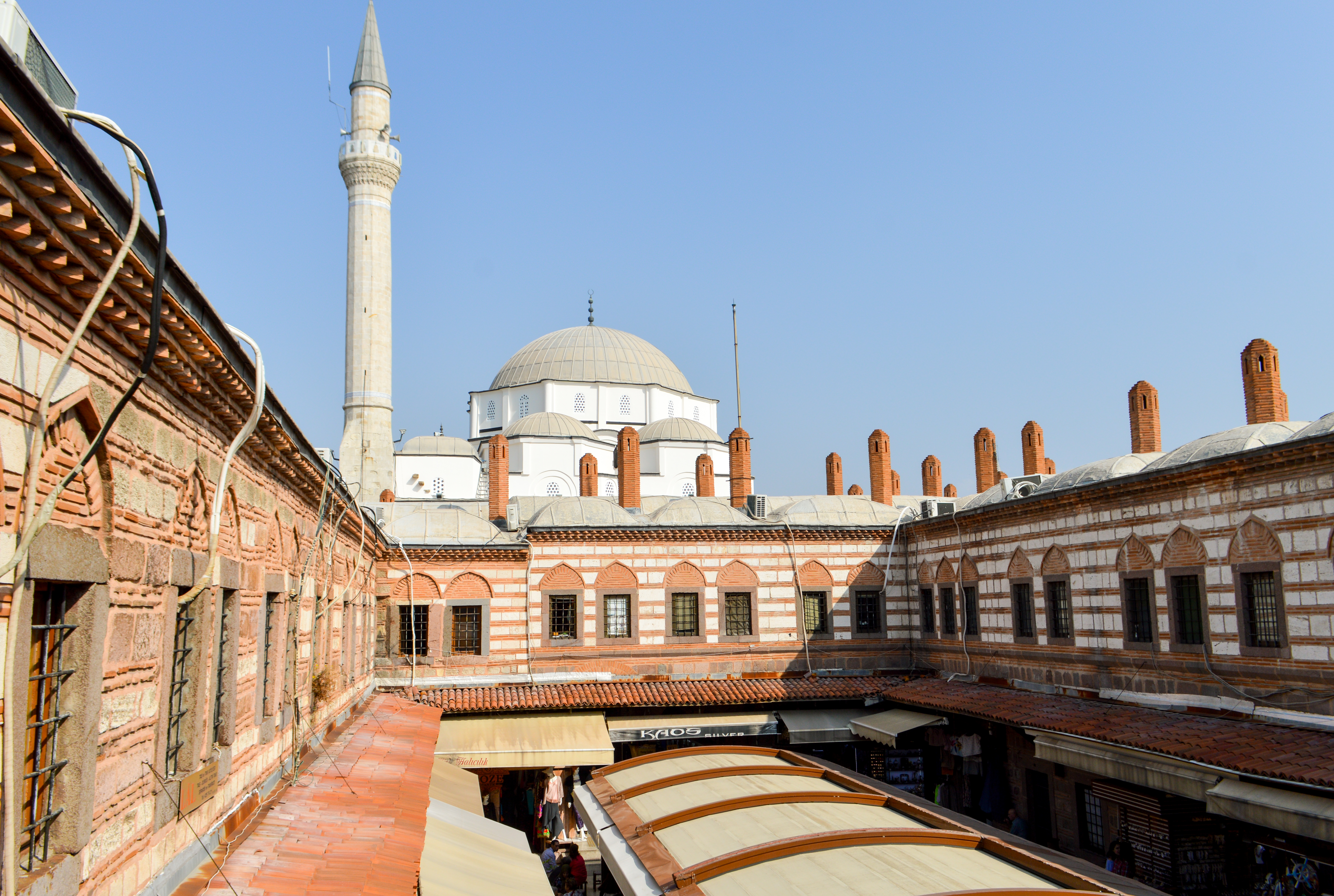

Religion
- Affiliation: Islam

Location
- Location: Kemeraltı, İzmir, Turkey
- Interactive map of Hisar Mosque
- Coordinates: 38.421507°N 27.13359°E

Architecture
- Type: Mosque
- Established: 1598

The Hisar Mosque (Turkish: Hisar Camii; meaning the "Fort Mosque") or Hisarönü Mosque (Hisarönü Camii) is a historical Mosque in İzmir, Turkey. It has been recorded to have been constructed by Ottoman governor Aydınoğlu Yakup Bey who was Bey of İzmir between 1592 and 1598. The 16th century Mosque is one of the biggest in the city centre and its interior contains one of the most striking examples of Ottoman Islamic artwork in İzmir.

== Architecture ==
The Mosque has one main dome in the centre facing the entrance supported by eight large pillars along with three large domes on either side. There are three smaller domes at the back of the top. The courtyard has a series of seven domes on the sides. There is a şadırvanı (fountain used for Islamic ritual washing) overlooking the courtyard. The Mosque has been restored in 1813, 1881, 1927 and 1980 after damage.

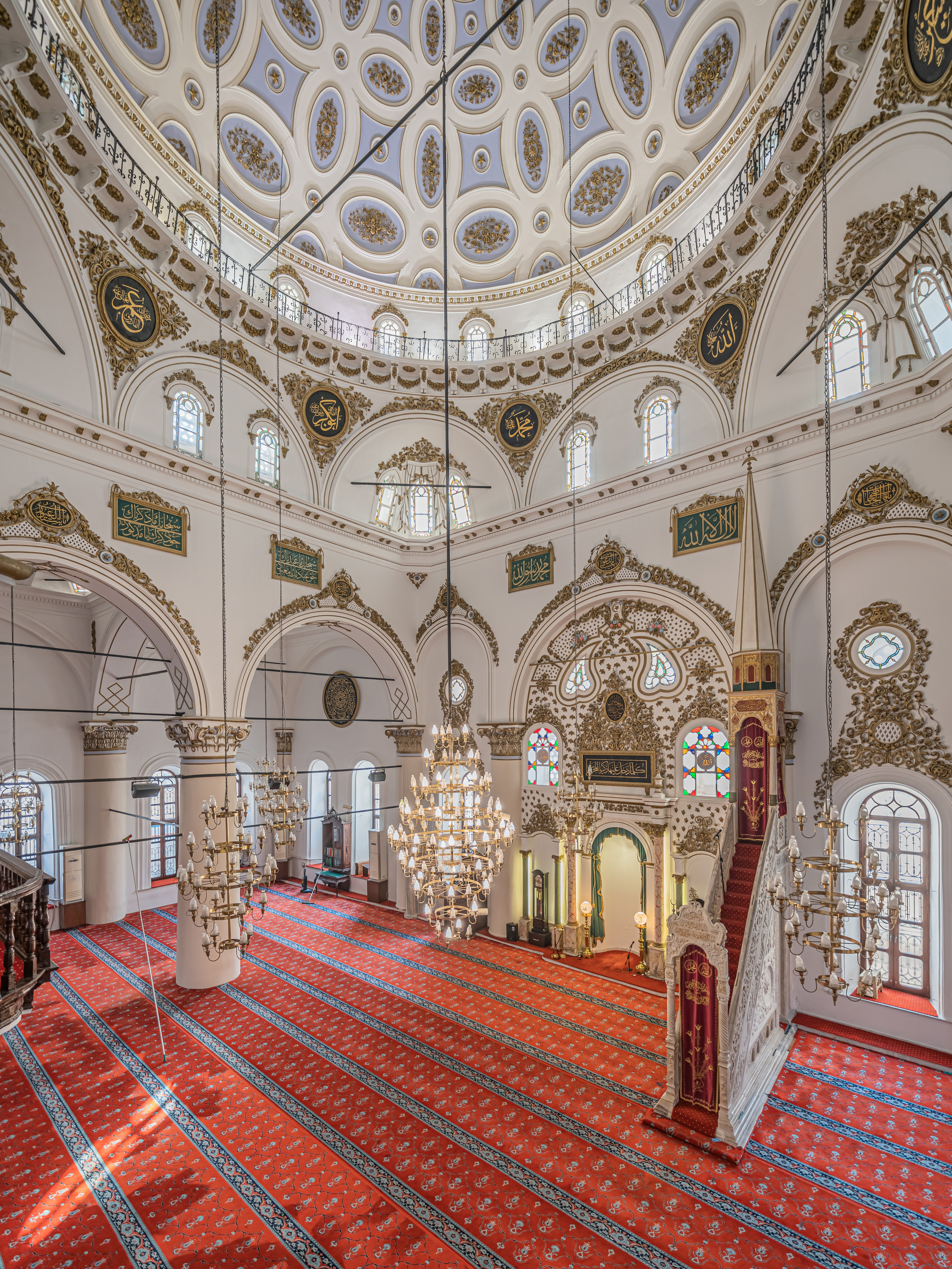
Interior of the Hisar Mosque

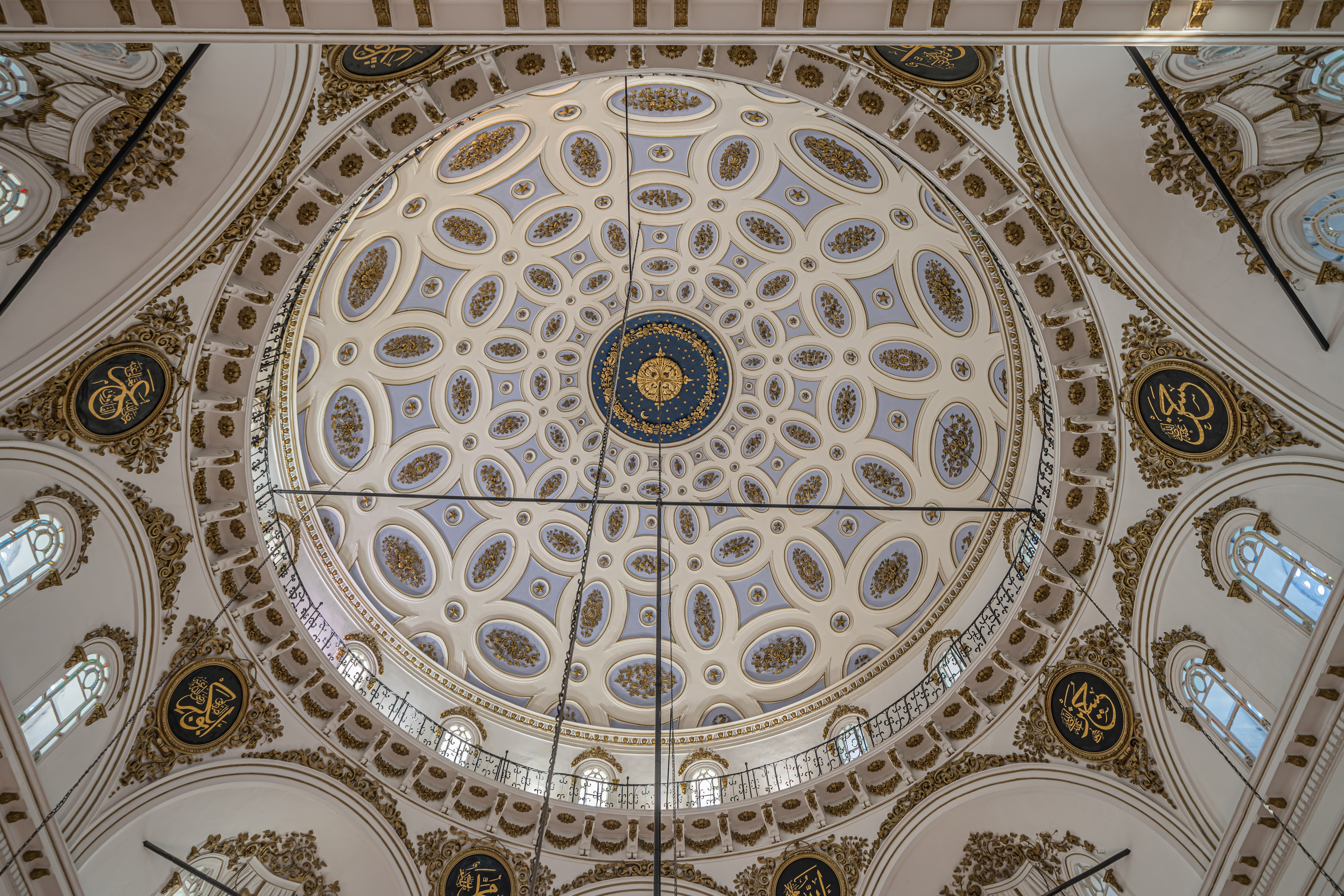
Dome interior

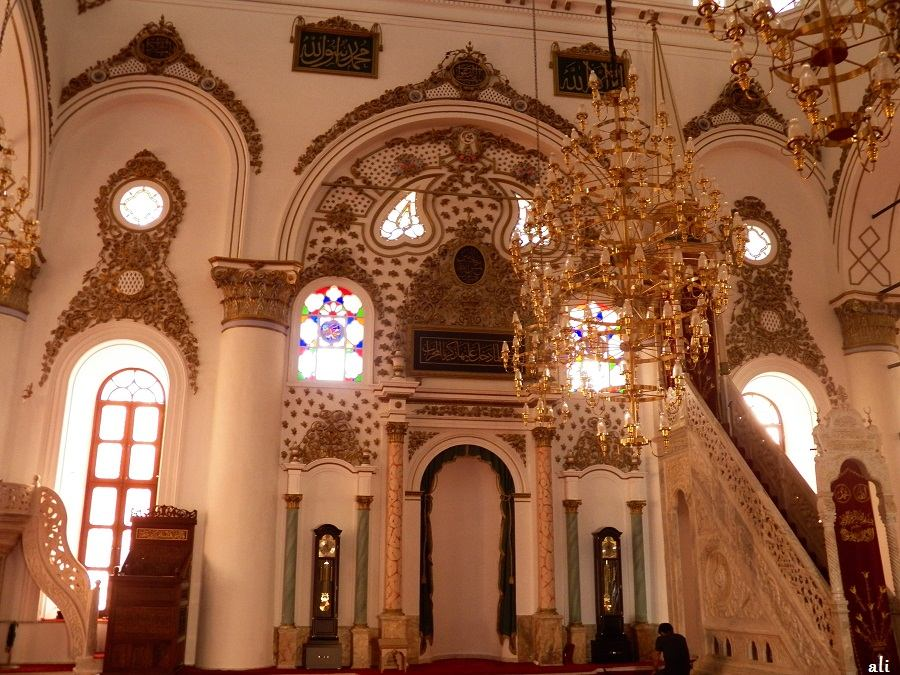
Mihrab of the Mosque

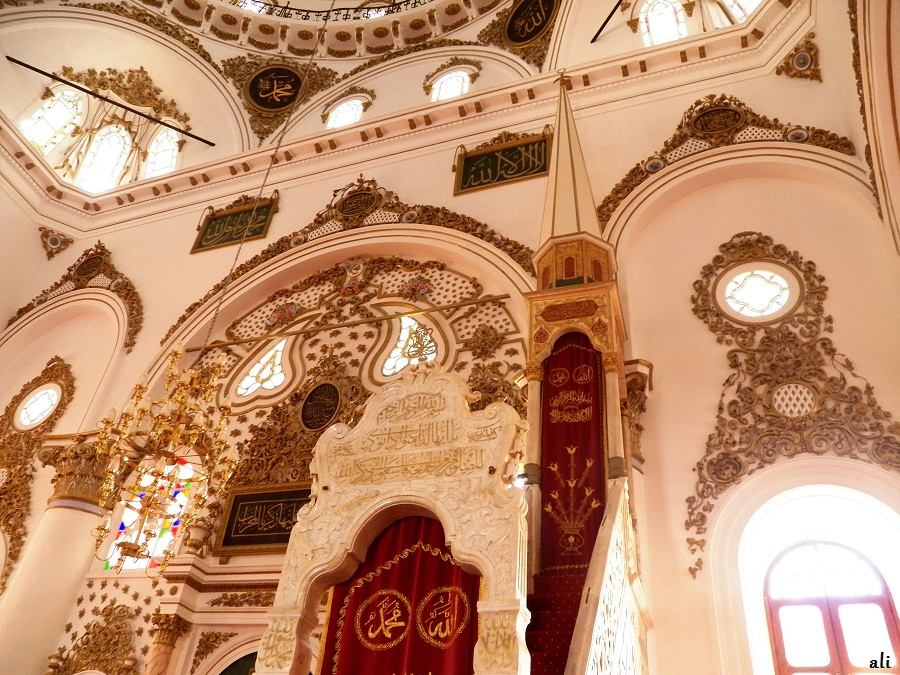
Minbar of the Mosque
