= Hesar-e Meydan Daghi =

Hesar-e Meydan Daghi حصارميدان داغي
- Village
- Location within Iran
- Coordinates: 37°40′47″N 47°55′41″E
- Country: Iran
- Province: East Azerbaijan
- County: Meyaneh
- Bakhsh: Kandovan
- Rural District: Kandovan

Population (2006)
  - Total: 198
- Time zone: UTC+3:30 (IRST)
  - Summer (DST): UTC+4:30 (IRDT)

Hesar-e Meydan Daghi (Persian: حصارميدان داغي, also Romanized as Ḩeşār-e Meydān Dāghī; also known as Ḩeşār) is a village in Kandovan Rural District, Kandovan District, Meyaneh County, East Azerbaijan Province, Iran. At the 2006 census, its population was 198, in 40 families.
