= Hesar-e Tarmani =

Hesar-e Tarmani حصارترمني
- Village
- Location within Iran
- Coordinates: 37°32′56″N 45°10′32″E
- Country: Iran
- Province: West Azerbaijan
- County: Urmia
- Bakhsh: Central
- Rural District: Bakeshluchay

Population (2006)
  - Total: 21
- Time zone: UTC+3:30 (IRST)
  - Summer (DST): UTC+4:30 (IRDT)

Hesar-e Tarmani (Persian: حصارترمني, also Romanized as Ḩeşār-e Tarmanī; also known as Ḩeşār-e Qareh Ḩasanlū) is a village in Bakeshluchay Rural District, in the Central District of Urmia County, West Azerbaijan Province, Iran. According to the 2006 census, its population was 21 inhabitants, in 5 families.
