= Hesar, Mashhad =

Hesar حصار
- Village
- Location within Iran
- Coordinates: 36°41′53″N 59°26′52″E
- Country: Iran
- Province: Razavi Khorasan
- County: Mashhad
- Bakhsh: Central
- Rural District: Darzab

Population (2006)
  - Total: 320
- Time zone: UTC+3:30 (IRST)
  - Summer (DST): UTC+4:30 (IRDT)

Hesar (Persian: حصار, also Romanized as Ḩeşār; also known as Hisār) is a village in Darzab Rural District, in the Central District of Mashhad County, Razavi Khorasan Province, Iran. At the 2006 census, its population was 320, in 70 families.
