= Hesar Kharabeh =

Hesar Kharabeh حصارخرابه
- Village
- Location within Iran
- Coordinates: 37°42′36″N 44°56′23″E
- Country: Iran
- Province: West Azerbaijan
- County: Urmia
- Bakhsh: Nazlu
- Rural District: Nazluchay

Population (2006)
  - Total: 84
- Time zone: UTC+3:30 (IRST)
  - Summer (DST): UTC+4:30 (IRDT)

Hesar Kharabeh (Persian: حصارخرابه, also Romanized as Ḩeşār Kharābeh; also known as Ḩeşār and Ḩeşār Sardār) is a village in Nazluchay Rural District, Nazlu District, Urmia County, West Azerbaijan Province, Iran. At the 2006 census, its population was 84, in 16 families.
