= Hesar, Nishapur =

Hesar حصار
- Village
- Location within Iran
- Coordinates: 36°13′56″N 58°57′00″E
- Country: Iran
- Province: Razavi Khorasan
- County: Nishapur
- Bakhsh: Central
- Rural District: Fazl

Population (2006)
  - Total: 270
- Time zone: UTC+3:30 (IRST)
  - Summer (DST): UTC+4:30 (IRDT)

Hesar (Persian: حصار, also Romanized as Ḩeşār; also known as Ḩeşār-e Māzūl) is a village in Fazl Rural District, in the Central District of Nishapur County, Razavi Khorasan Province, Iran. At the 2006 census, its population was 270, in 85 families.
