= Hesar-e Dashtak =

Hesar-e Dashtak حصاردشتك
- Village
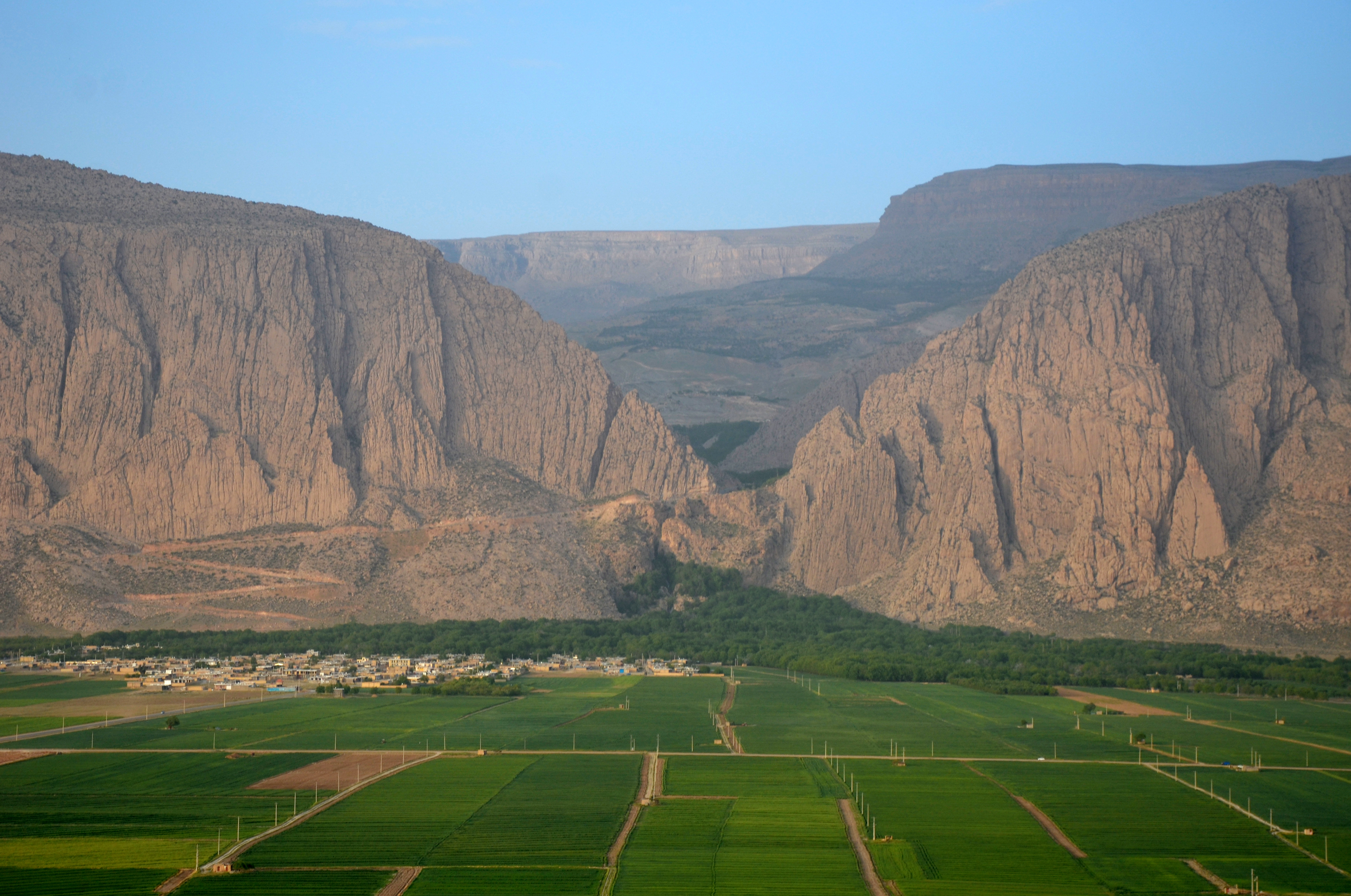

- Location within Iran
- Coordinates: 30°16′13″N 52°26′49″E
- Country: Iran
- Province: Fars
- County: Marvdasht
- Bakhsh: Dorudzan
- Rural District: Dorudzan

Population (2006)
  - Total: 1,281
- Time zone: UTC+3:30 (IRST)
  - Summer (DST): UTC+4:30 (IRDT)

Hesar-e Dashtak (Persian: حصاردشتك, also Romanized as Ḩeşār-e Dashtak; also known as Ḩeşār) is a village in Dorudzan Rural District, Dorudzan District, Marvdasht County, Fars province, Iran. At the 2006 census, its population was 1,281, in 303 families.
