= Hesar-e Qarah Tappeh =

Hesar-e Qarah Tappeh حصارقره تپه
- Village
- Location within Iran
- Coordinates: 38°21′41″N 44°52′37″E
- Country: Iran
- Province: West Azerbaijan
- County: Khoy
- Bakhsh: Central
- Rural District: Rahal

Population (2006)
  - Total: 124
- Time zone: UTC+3:30 (IRST)
  - Summer (DST): UTC+4:30 (IRDT)

Hesar-e Qarah Tappeh (Persian: حصارقره تپه, also Romanized as Ḩeşār-e Qarah Tappeh and Ḩeşār-e Qareh Tappeh) is a village in Rahal Rural District, in the Central District of Khoy County, West Azerbaijan Province, Iran. At the 2006 census, its population was 124, in 27 families.
