= Hesar-e Seyyedlar =

Hesar-e Seyyedlar حصارسيدلر
- Village
- Location within Iran
- Coordinates: 38°23′24″N 47°16′19″E
- Country: Iran
- Province: East Azerbaijan
- County: Ahar
- Bakhsh: Central
- Rural District: Qeshlaq

Population (2006)
  - Total: 34
- Time zone: UTC+3:30 (IRST)
  - Summer (DST): UTC+4:30 (IRDT)

Hesar-e Seyyedlar (Persian: حصارسيدلر, also Romanized as Ḩeşār-e Seyyedlar; also known as Ḩeşār) is a village in Qeshlaq Rural District, in the Central District of Ahar County, East Azerbaijan Province, Iran. At the 2006 census, its population was 34, in 10 families.
