= Hesar-e Sefid, Kermanshah =

Village in Kermanshah, Iran

Hesar-e Sefid حصارسفيد
- Village
- Location within Iran
- Coordinates: 34°19′50″N 47°09′34″E
- Country: Iran
- Province: Kermanshah
- County: Kermanshah
- Bakhsh: Central
- Rural District: Dorudfaraman

Population (2006)
  - Total: 184
- Time zone: UTC+3:30 (IRST)
  - Summer (DST): UTC+4:30 (IRDT)

Hesar-e Sefid (Persian: حصارسفيد, also Romanized as Ḩeşār-e Sefīd) is a village in Dorudfaraman Rural District, in the Central District of Kermanshah County, Kermanshah Province, Iran. At the 2006 census, its population was 184, in 37 families.
