= Karimabad Rural District =

Rural district in Tehran province, Iran

Karimabad Rural District Persian: دهستان كريم آباد
- Rural District
- Location within Iran
- Coordinates: 35°22′N 51°50′E
- Country: Iran
- Province: Tehran
- County: Pakdasht
- District: Sharifabad
- Established: 1987
- Capital: Karimabad

Population (2016)
  - Total: 7,106
- Time zone: UTC+3:30 (IRST)

Karimabad Rural District (Persian: دهستان كريم آباد) (Note: Formerly Behnamsokhteh-e Shomali Rural District (دهستان بهنام سوخته شمالي)) is in Sharifabad District of Pakdasht County, Tehran province, Iran. Its capital is the village of Karimabad.

== Demographics ==
=== Population ===
At the time of the 2006 National Census, the rural district's population was 7,325 in 1,780 households. There were 6,933 inhabitants in 1,828 households at the following census of 2011. The 2016 census measured the population of the rural district as 7,106 in 2,008 households. The most populous of its 15 villages was Karimabad, with 2,425 people.

=== Other villages in the rural district ===
- Heydarabad
- Kahrizak
- Kalin-e Khalaseh
- Kalin-e Sadat
- Mandakan
- Qeshlaq-e Karimabad
