= Pakdasht =

City in Tehran province, Iran

Pakdasht Persian: پاكدشت
- City
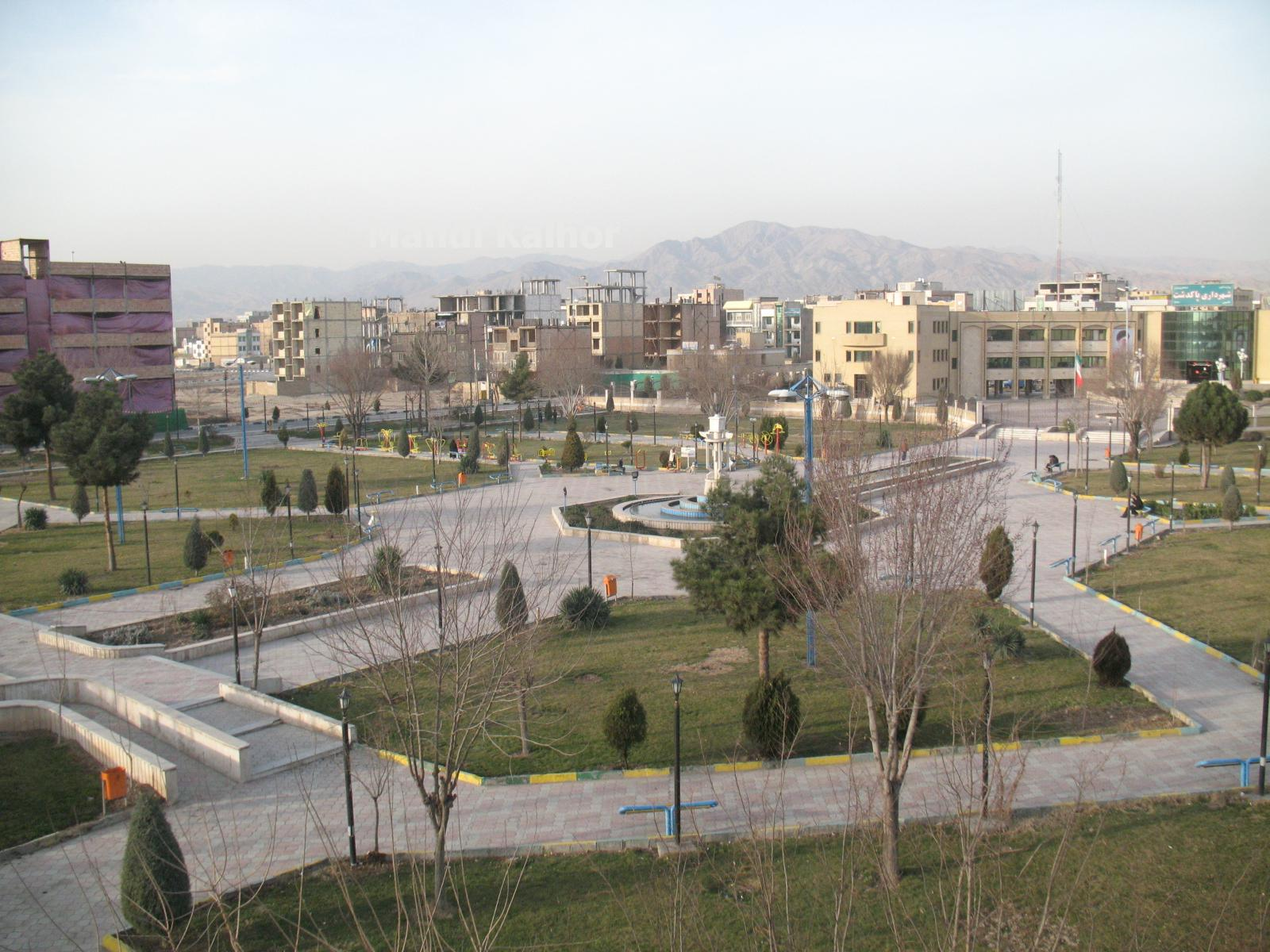
- Park in the city of Pakdasht

- Location within Iran
- Coordinates: 35°28′58″N 51°40′53″E
- Country: Iran
- Province: Tehran
- County: Pakdasht
- District: Central

Population (2016)
  - Total: 236,319
- Time zone: UTC+3:30 (IRST)

Pakdasht (Persian: پاكدشت) (Note: Also romanized as Pākdasht; also known as Palasht, Palesht, Palishth, Pol Dasht, and Polasht) is a city in the Central District of Pakdasht County, Tehran province, Iran, serving as capital of both the county and the district. In 1989, the village of Pakdasht merged with the villages of Mamazan (مامازن) and Quheh (قوهه).

== Demographics ==
=== Population ===
Population history
Year	Pop.	±%
1956	1,704	—
1966	2,668	+56.6%
1976	5,459	+104.6%
1986	18,308	+235.4%
1991	33,273	+81.7%
1996	49,220	+47.9%
2006	126,281	+156.6%
2011	206,490	+63.5%
2016	236,319	+14.4%

At the time of the 2006 National Census, the city's population was 126,281 in 32,625 households. The following census in 2011 counted 206,490 people in 58,257 households. The 2016 census measured the population of the city as 236,319 people in 70,220 households.

== See also ==
Media related to Pakdasht at Wikimedia Commons
