= Hesar-e Sofla, Zanjan =

Village in Zanjan province, Iran

Hesar-e Sofla Persian: حصارسفلي
- Village
- Location within Iran
- Coordinates: 35°50′46″N 48°17′14″E
- Country: Iran
- Province: Zanjan
- County: Khodabandeh
- District: Afshar
- Rural District: Shivanat

Population (2016)
  - Total: 186
- Time zone: UTC+3:30 (IRST)

Hesar-e Sofla (Persian: حصارسفلي) (Note: Also romanized as Hesar Sofla and Ḩeşār-e Soflá; also known as Hesār, Ḩeşār-e Pā’īn, and Hīsār Pāīn) is a village in Shivanat Rural District of Afshar District in Khodabandeh County, Zanjan province, Iran.

== Demographics ==
=== Population ===
At the time of the 2006 National Census, the village's population was 234 in 58 households. The following census in 2011 counted 201 people in 60 households. The 2016 census measured the population of the village as 186 people in 54 households.
