= Sharifabad, Iran =

City in Tehran province, Iran

Sharifabad Persian: شريف آباد
- City
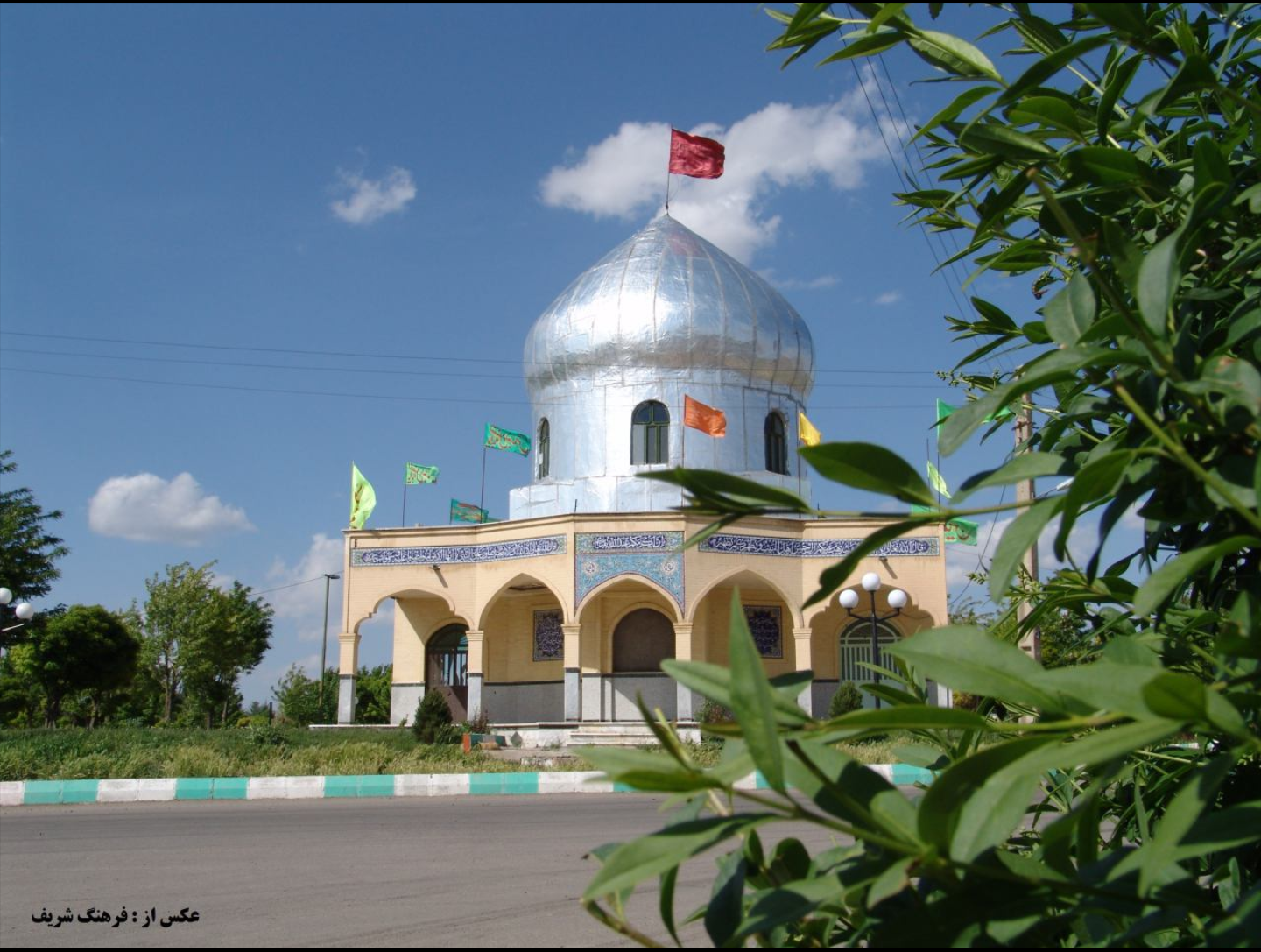
- Mosque in the city of Sharifabad

- Location within Iran
- Coordinates: 35°25′38″N 51°47′03″E
- Country: Iran
- Province: Tehran
- County: Pakdasht
- District: Sharifabad
- Established as a city: 2001

Population (2016)
  - Total: 18,281
- Time zone: UTC+3:30 (IRST)

Sharifabad (Persian: شريف آباد) (Note: Also romanized as Sharīfābād) is a city in, and the capital of, Sharifabad District of Pakdasht County, Tehran province, Iran. It also serves as the administrative center for Sharifabad Rural District. The village of Sharifabad was converted to a city in 2001.

== Demographics ==
=== Population ===
At the time of the 2006 National Census, the city's population was 8,870 in 2,249 households. The following census in 2011 counted 12,332 people in 3,384 households. The 2016 census measured the population of the city as 18,281 people in 5,368 households.

== See also ==
Media related to Sharifabad, Iran at Wikimedia Commons
