= Hesar-e Pain =

Village in Tehran province, Iran

Hesar-e Pain Persian: حصارپائين
- Village
- Location within Iran
- Coordinates: 35°40′02″N 52°02′03″E
- Country: Iran
- Province: Tehran
- County: Damavand
- District: Central
- Rural District: Tarrud
- Elevation: 1,820 m (5,970 ft)

Population (2016)
  - Total: 691
- Time zone: UTC+3:30 (IRST)

Hesar-e Pain (Persian: حصارپائين) (Note: Also romanized as Ḩeşār Pā’īn and Ḩeşar-e Pā’īn; also known as Ḩeşār-e Pā’īn va Qūrdlū and Hisār Pāīn) is a village in Tarrud Rural District of the Central District in Damavand County, Tehran province, Iran.

== Demographics ==
=== Population ===
At the time of the 2006 National Census, the village's population was 421 in 109 households. The following census in 2011 counted 558 people in 160 households. The 2016 census measured the population of the village as 691 people in 224 households.
