= Hesar-e Sofla, West Azerbaijan =

Hesar-e Sofla حصارسفلي
- Village
- Location within Iran
- Coordinates: 38°28′13″N 44°51′23″E
- Country: Iran
- Province: West Azerbaijan
- County: Khoy
- Bakhsh: Central
- Rural District: Rahal

Population (2006)
  - Total: 202
- Time zone: UTC+3:30 (IRST)
  - Summer (DST): UTC+4:30 (IRDT)

Hesar-e Sofla (Persian: حصارسفلي, also Romanized as Ḩeşār-e Soflá; also known as Ḩeşār-e Pā'īn) is a village in Rahal Rural District, in the Central District of Khoy County, West Azerbaijan Province, Iran. At the 2006 census, its population was 202, in 46 families.
