= Hesar-e Olya, Zanjan =

Village in Zanjan province, Iran

Hesar-e Olya Persian: حصارعليا
- Village
- Location within Iran
- Coordinates: 35°49′12″N 48°17′48″E
- Country: Iran
- Province: Zanjan
- County: Khodabandeh
- District: Afshar
- Rural District: Shivanat

Population (2016)
  - Total: 334
- Time zone: UTC+3:30 (IRST)

Hesar-e Olya (Persian: حصارعليا) (Note: Also romanized as Hesar Olya and Ḩeşār-e ‘Olyā; also known as Ḩeşār-e Bālā and Hisār Bāla) is a village in Shivanat Rural District of Afshar District in Khodabandeh County, Zanjan province, Iran.

== Demographics ==
=== Population ===
At the time of the 2006 National Census, the village's population was 350 in 67 households. The following census in 2011 counted 346 people in 88 households. The 2016 census measured the population of the village as 334 people in 87 households.
