= Central District (Pakdasht County) =

District in Tehran province, Iran

Central District (Pakdasht County) Persian: بخش مرکزی شهرستان پاکدشت
- District
- Location within Iran
- Coordinates: 35°32′N 51°44′E
- Country: Iran
- Province: Tehran
- County: Pakdasht
- Established: 1997
- Capital: Pakdasht

Population (2016)
  - Total: 286,528
- Time zone: UTC+3:30 (IRST)

The Central District of Pakdasht County (Persian: بخش مرکزی شهرستان پاکدشت) is in Tehran province, Iran. Its capital is the city of Pakdasht.

== History ==
The village of Ferunabad was converted to a city in 2010.

== Demographics ==
=== Population ===
At the time of the 2006 National Census, the district's population was 203,050 in 51,476 households. The following census in 2011 counted 249,456 people in 69,901 households. The 2016 census measured the population of the district as 286,528 inhabitants in 84,786 households.

=== Administrative divisions ===
Central District (Pakdasht County) Population
Administrative Divisions	2006	2011	2016
Ferunabad RD	17,065	5,723	6,136
Filestan RD	14,622	16,147	15,926
Hesar-e Amir RD (Note: Formerly Behnampazuki-ye Shomali Rural District)	45,082	6,659	6,465
Ferunabad (city)		14,437	21,682
Pakdasht (city)	126,281	206,490	236,319
Total	203,050	249,456	286,528
RD = Rural District
