= Sharifabad District =

District in Tehran province, Iran

Sharifabad District Persian: بخش شریف‌آباد
- District
- Location within Iran
- Coordinates: 35°25′N 51°49′E
- Country: Iran
- Province: Tehran
- County: Pakdasht
- Established: 1997
- Capital: Sharifabad

Population (2016)
  - Total: 64,433
- Time zone: UTC+3:30 (IRST)

Sharifabad District (Persian: بخش شریف‌آباد) is in Pakdasht County, Tehran province, Iran. Its capital is the city of Sharifabad.

== Demographics ==
=== Population ===
At the time of the 2006 National Census, the district's population was 37,791 in 9,758 households. The following census in 2011 counted 41,941 people in 11,528 households. The 2016 census measured the population of the district as 64,433 inhabitants in 18,751 households.

=== Administrative divisions ===
Sharifabad District Population
Administrative Divisions	2006	2011	2016
Jamalabad RD	12,718	13,426	29,684
Karimabad RD (Note: Formerly Behnamsokhteh-e Shomali Rural District)	7,325	6,933	7,106
Sharifabad RD	8,878	9,250	9,362
Sharifabad (city)	8,870	12,332	18,281
Total	37,791	41,941	64,433
RD = Rural District
