= Pakdasht County =

County in Tehran province, Iran

Pakdasht County Persian: شهرستان پاکدشت
- County
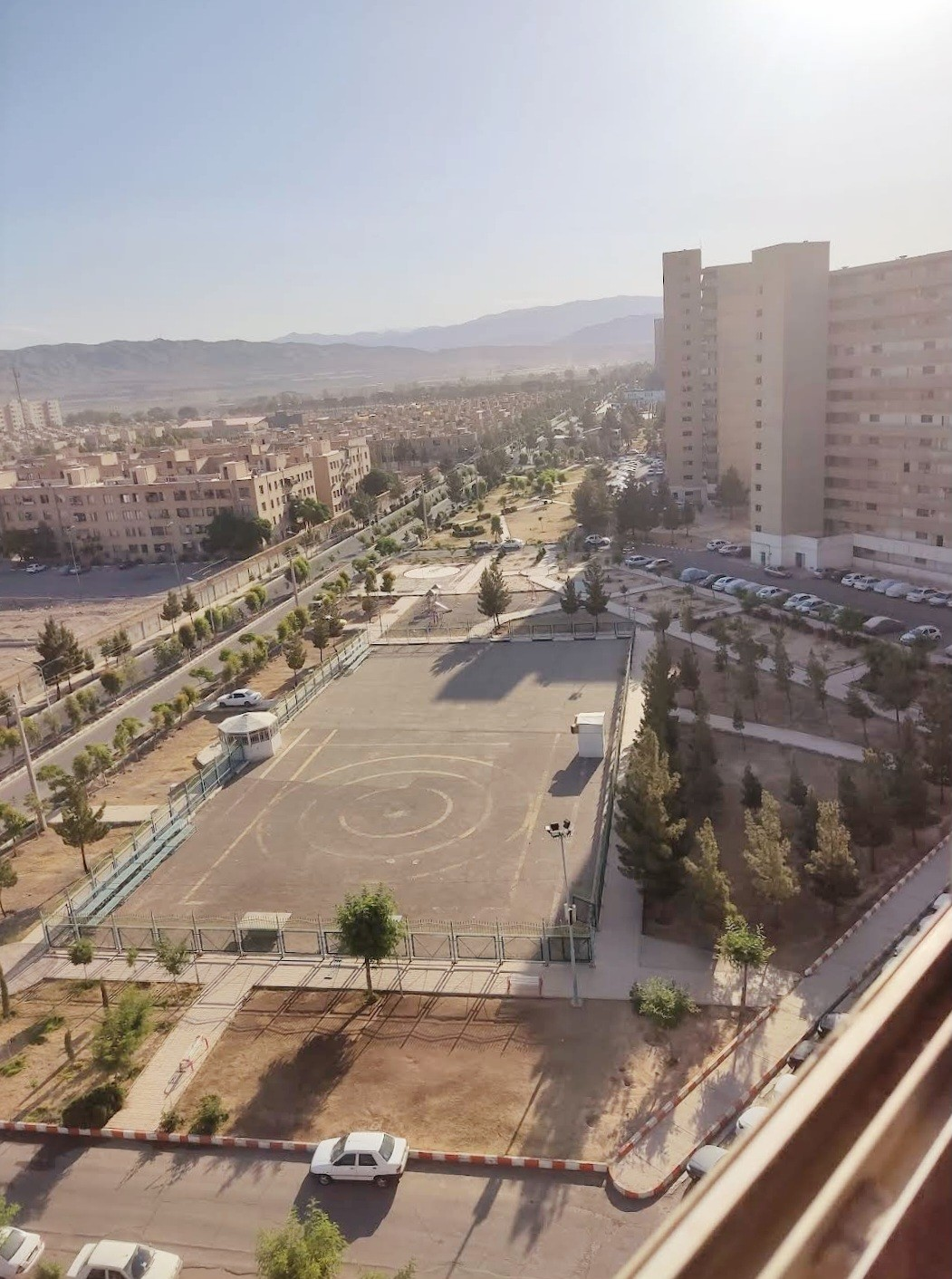
- The city of Pakdasht

- Location of Pakdasht County in Tehran province (center right, green)

- Location of Tehran province in Iran
- Coordinates: 35°29′N 51°46′E
- Country: Iran
- Province: Tehran
- Established: 1997
- Capital: Pakdasht
- Districts: Central, Sharifabad

Population (2016)
  - Total: 350,966
- Time zone: UTC+3:30 (IRST)

Pakdasht County (Persian: شهرستان پاکدشت) is in Tehran province, Iran. Its capital is the city of Pakdasht. Pakdasht is a center of flower production in Iran. About 800,000 hectares of greenhouses for producing flowers exist in this area.

== History ==
The village of Ferunabad was converted to a city in 2010.

== Demographics ==
=== Population ===
At the time of the 2006 National Census, the county's population was 240,841 in 61,234 households. The following census in 2011 counted 291,397 people in 81,402 households. The 2016 census measured the population of the county as 350,966 in 103,542 households.

=== Administrative divisions ===
Pakdasht County's population history and administrative structure over three consecutive censuses are shown in the following table.

Pakdasht County Population
Administrative Divisions	2006	2011	2016
Central District	203,050	249,456	286,528
Ferunabad RD	17,065	5,723	6,136
Filestan RD	14,622	16,147	15,926
Hesar-e Amir RD (Note: Formerly Behnampazuki-ye Shomali Rural District)	45,082	6,659	6,465
Ferunabad (city)		14,437	21,682
Pakdasht (city)	126,281	206,490	236,319
Sharifabad District	37,791	41,941	64,433
Jamalabad RD	12,718	13,426	29,684
Karimabad RD (Note: Formerly Behnamsokhteh-e Shomali Rural District)	7,325	6,933	7,106
Sharifabad RD	8,878	9,250	9,362
Sharifabad (city)	8,870	12,332	18,281
Total	240,841	291,397	350,966
RD = Rural District

== Climate ==
According to the information of the State Meteorological Organization of Iran, the long-term average annual rainfall of Pakdasht is around 153.2 mm

== See also ==
Media related to Pakdasht County at Wikimedia Commons
