= Sharifabad, Zanjan =

Neighborhood in Zanjan province, Iran

Sharifabad Persian: شريف اباد
- Neighborhood
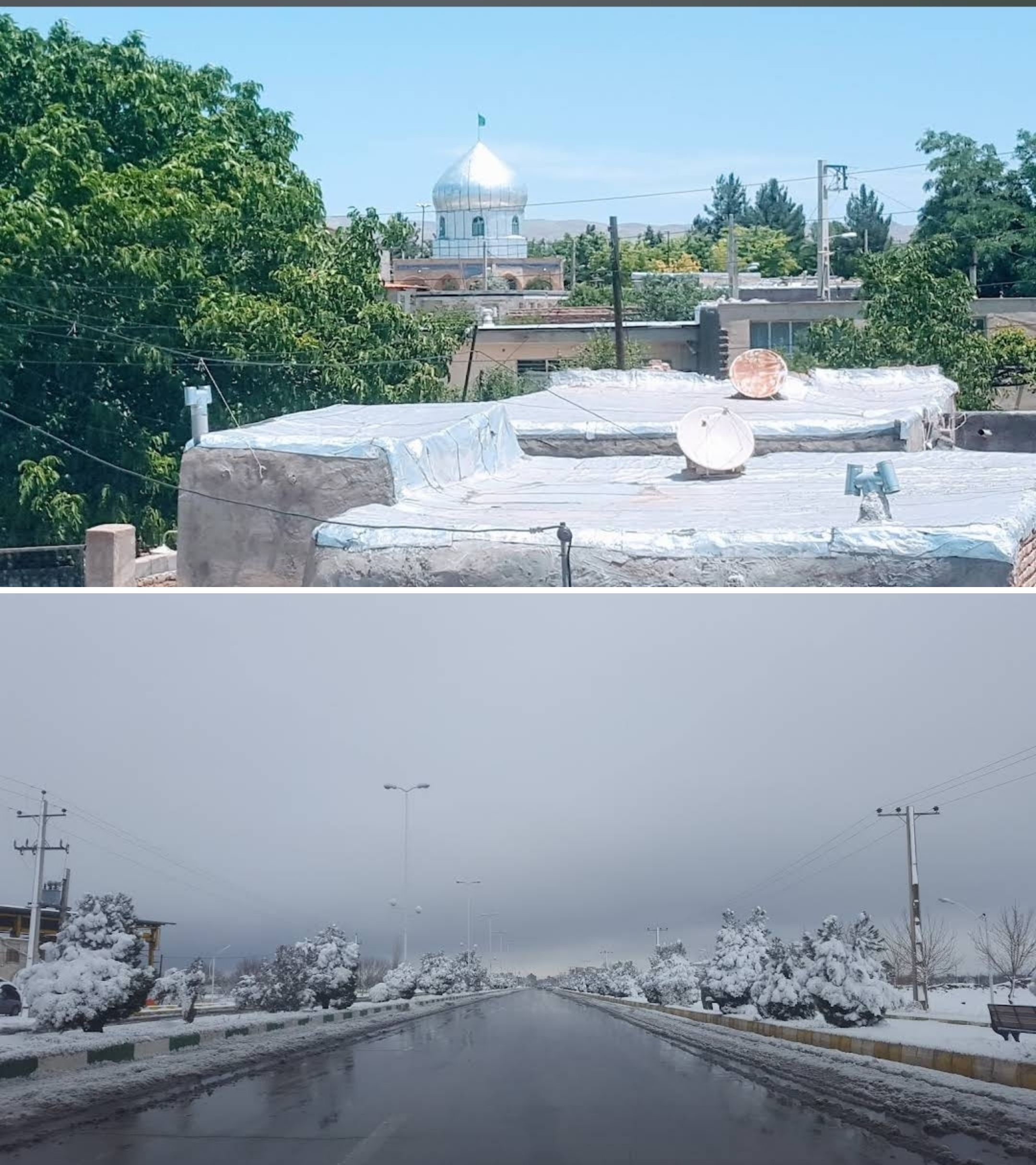
- Sharifabad, Abhar, Abhar County, Zanjan province, Iran

- Location within Iran
- Coordinates: 36°08′07″N 49°16′05″E
- Country: Iran
- Province: Zanjan
- County: Abhar
- District: Central
- City: Abhar

Population (2006)
  - Total: 5,521
- Time zone: UTC+3:30 (IRST)
- Area code: 0242536

Sharifabad (Persian: شريف اباد) (Note: Also romanized as Sharīfābād) is a neighborhood in the city of Abhar in the Central District of Abhar County, Zanjan province, Iran. until its capital was transferred to the village of Nurin.

== Demographics ==
=== Population ===
At the time of the 2006 National Census, Sharifabad's population was 5,521 in 1,467 households, when it was a village in Howmeh Rural District. Sharifabad has been annexed by the city of Abhar.
