= Jodaqiyeh, Zanjan =

Village in Zanjan province, Iran

Jodaqiyeh Persian: جداقيه
- Village
- Location within Iran
- Coordinates: 36°26′59″N 48°59′49″E
- Country: Iran
- Province: Zanjan
- County: Abhar
- District: Central
- Rural District: Sain Qaleh

Population (2016)
  - Total: 537
- Time zone: UTC+3:30 (IRST)

Jodaqiyeh (Persian: جداقيه) (Note: Also romanized as Jodāqīyeh; also known as Dzhudakir, Jedā Qayeh, Jedāqayā, Jodaghiya, and Judaqīr) is a village in Sain Qaleh Rural District of the Central District in Abhar County, Zanjan province, Iran.

== Demographics ==
=== Population ===
At the time of the 2006 National Census, the village's population was 560 in 151 households. The following census in 2011 counted 475 people in 153 households. The 2016 census measured the population of the village as 537 people in 172 households.
