= Yengi Kand, Zanjan =

Village in Zanjan province, Iran

Yengi Kand Persian: ينگي كند
- Village
- Location within Iran
- Coordinates: 35°55′30″N 49°02′52″E
- Country: Iran
- Province: Zanjan
- County: Abhar
- District: Central
- Rural District: Dowlatabad

Population (2016)
  - Total: 87
- Time zone: UTC+3:30 (IRST)

Yengi Kand (Persian: ينگي كند) (Note: Also romanized as Yangi Kand and Yengī Kand; also known as Yengi Kand Abhar Rood and Yenkī Kandī) is a village in Dowlatabad Rural District of the Central District in Abhar County, Zanjan province, Iran.

== Demographics ==
=== Population ===
At the time of the 2006 National Census, the village's population was 161 in 45 households. The following census in 2011 counted 134 people in 41 households. The 2016 census measured the population of the village as 87 people in 26 households.
