= Aghur =

Village in Zanjan province, Iran

Aghur Persian: اغور
- Village
- Location within Iran
- Coordinates: 35°53′14″N 49°03′28″E
- Country: Iran
- Province: Zanjan
- County: Abhar
- District: Central
- Rural District: Dowlatabad

Population (2016)
  - Total: 260
- Time zone: UTC+3:30 (IRST)

Aghur (Persian: اغور) (Note: Also romanized as Āghūr; also known as Aghar and Āghūz) is a village in Dowlatabad Rural District of the Central District in Abhar County, Zanjan province, Iran.

== Demographics ==
=== Population ===
At the time of the 2006 National Census, the village's population was 352 in 73 households. The following census in 2011 counted 310 people in 87 households. The 2016 census measured the population of the village as 260 people in 57 households.
