= Chashin, Zanjan =

Village in Zanjan province, Iran

Chashin Persian: چشين
- Village
- Location within Iran
- Coordinates: 36°02′53″N 49°03′50″E
- Country: Iran
- Province: Zanjan
- County: Abhar
- District: Central
- Rural District: Dowlatabad

Population (2016)
  - Total: 236
- Time zone: UTC+3:30 (IRST)

Chashin (Persian: چشين) (Note: Also romanized as Chashīn and Cheshīn) is a village in Dowlatabad Rural District of the Central District in Abhar County, Zanjan province, Iran.

== Demographics ==
=== Population ===
At the time of the 2006 National Census, the village's population was 359 in 73 households. The following census in 2011 counted 331 people in 75 households. The 2016 census measured the population of the village as 236 people in 72 households.
