= Amir Bostaq =

Village in Zanjan province, Iran

Amir Bostaq Persian: اميربستاق
- Village
- Location within Iran
- Coordinates: 36°03′33″N 49°01′33″E
- Country: Iran
- Province: Zanjan
- County: Abhar
- District: Central
- Rural District: Dowlatabad

Population (2016)
  - Total: 144
- Time zone: UTC+3:30 (IRST)

Amir Bostaq (Persian: اميربستاق) (Note: Also romanized as Amīr Bostāq; also known as Amīr Mūsa and Amir-Muza) is a village in Dowlatabad Rural District of the Central District in Abhar County, Zanjan province, Iran.

== Demographics ==
=== Population ===
At the time of the 2006 National Census, the village's population was 233 in 49 households. The following census in 2011 counted 178 people in 53 households. The 2016 census measured the population of the village as 144 people in 41 households.

== Overview ==
The village consists of two tribes: the Khoini and the Bakhtiari. Like any other traditional climate, there are intellectual and tribal differences between these two tribes, and sometimes there are links established through scattered alliances.

Amir Bostaq also has a registered historical monument, the Amir Bostaq Square Hill, which dates back to the Bronze Age and Iron Age and is located 1,000 meters southeast of the village. The monument was registered on 16 March 2007 (registration number 22189) as one of the national monuments of Iran.
