= Sarv-e Jahan =

Village in Zanjan province, Iran

Sarv-e Jahan Persian: سروجهان
- Village
- Location within Iran
- Coordinates: 36°15′46″N 48°58′14″E
- Country: Iran
- Province: Zanjan
- County: Abhar
- District: Central
- Rural District: Sain Qaleh

Population (2016)
  - Total: 219
- Time zone: UTC+3:30 (IRST)

Sarv-e Jahan (Persian: سروجهان) (Note: Also romanized as Sarvajahān and Sarv-e Jahān; also known as Sarvandzhakhan) is a village in Sain Qaleh Rural District of the Central District in Abhar County, Zanjan province, Iran.

== Demographics ==
=== Population ===
At the time of the 2006 National Census, the village's population was 436 in 92 households. The following census in 2011 counted 355 people in 77 households. The 2016 census measured the population of the village as 219 people in 52 households.
