= Hesar-e Qajar =

Village in Zanjan province, Iran

Hesar-e Qajar Persian: حصارقاجار
- Village
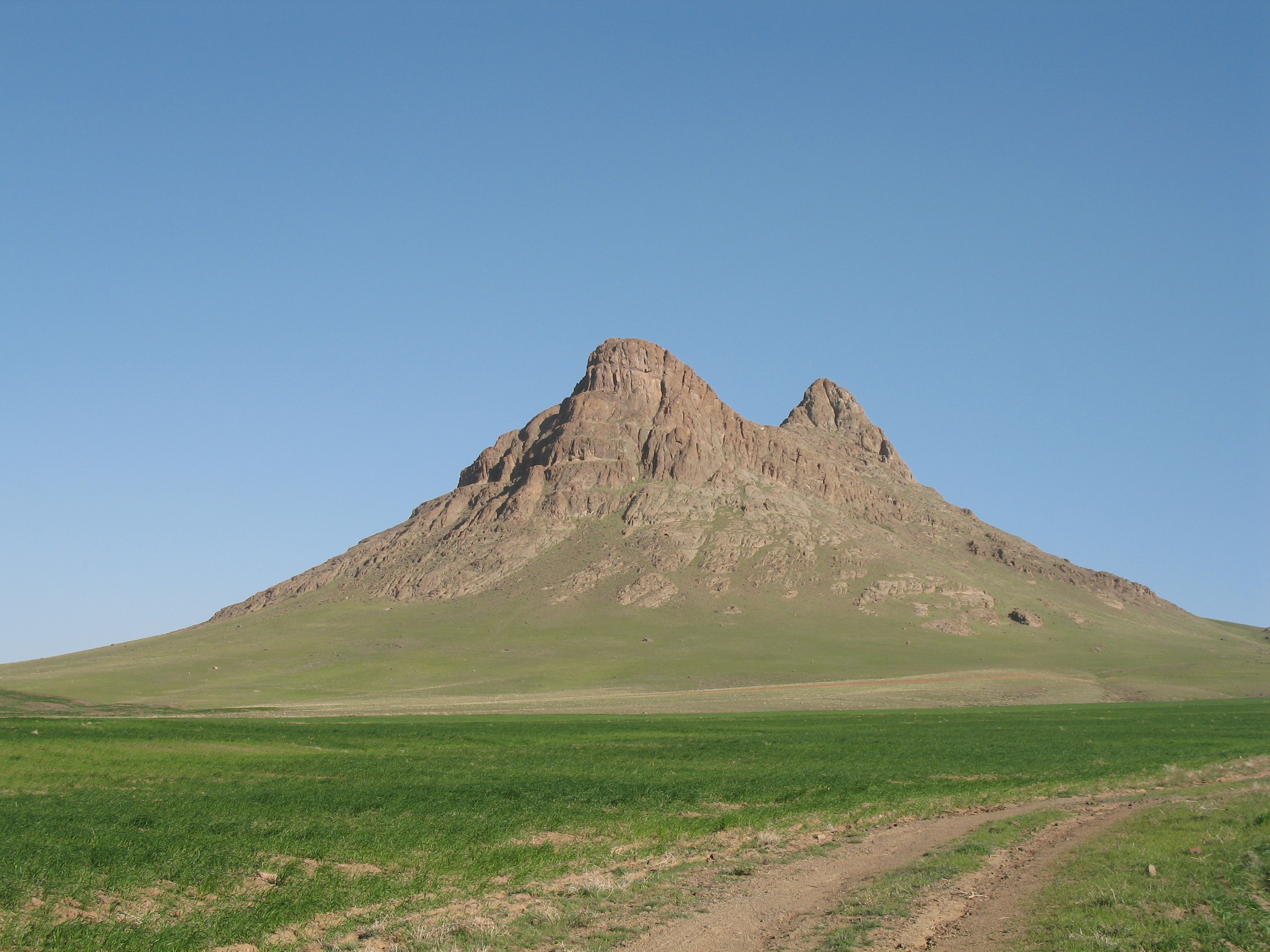
- The nearby mountain peak of Shotor Kuh, known for its "camel-like" appearance

- Location within Iran
- Coordinates: 36°04′05″N 49°20′24″E
- Country: Iran
- Province: Zanjan
- County: Abhar
- District: Central
- Rural District: Howmeh

Population (2016)
  - Total: 127
- Time zone: UTC+3:30 (IRST)

Hesar-e Qajar (Persian: حصارقاجار) (Note: Also romanized as Ḩeşār Qājār and Ḩeşār-e Qājār; also known as Kadzhar and Qājar) is a village in Howmeh Rural District of the Central District in Abhar County, Zanjan province, Iran.

== Demographics ==
=== Population ===
At the time of the 2006 National Census, the village's population was 330 in 94 households. The following census in 2011 counted 195 people in 61 households. The 2016 census measured the population of the village as 127 people in 55 households.
