= Kalangarz =

Village in Zanjan province, Iran

Kalangarz Persian: كلنگرز
- Village
- Location within Iran
- Coordinates: 36°03′17″N 49°11′06″E
- Country: Iran
- Province: Zanjan
- County: Abhar
- District: Central
- Rural District: Darsajin

Population (2016)
  - Total: 91
- Time zone: UTC+3:30 (IRST)

Kalangarz (Persian: كلنگرز) (Note: Also known as Kalangar, Kholangarz, Kolangar, Kolangaz, Kolengaz, and Kulangarz) is a village in Darsajin Rural District of the Central District in Abhar County, Zanjan province, Iran.

== Demographics ==
=== Population ===
At the time of the 2006 National Census, the village's population was 193 in 43 households. The following census in 2011 counted 140 people in 38 households. The 2016 census measured the population of the village as 91 people in 30 households.
