= Amirabad, Abhar =

Village in Zanjan province, Iran

Amirabad Persian: امیرآباد
- Village
- Location within Iran
- Coordinates: 36°16′11″N 49°23′06″E
- Country: Iran
- Province: Zanjan
- County: Abhar
- District: Central
- Rural District: Howmeh

Population (2016)
  - Total: 18
- Time zone: UTC+3:30 (IRST)

Amirabad (Persian: امیرآباد) (Note: Also romanized as Amīrābād) is a village in Howmeh Rural District of the Central District in Abhar County, Zanjan province, Iran.

== Demographics ==
=== Population ===
At the time of the 2006 National Census, the village's population was 16 in six households. The village did not appear in the following census of 2011. The 2016 census measured the population of the village as 18 people in four households.
