= Qeshlaq-e Marshun =

Village in Zanjan province, Iran

Qeshlaq-e Marshun Persian: قشلاق مرشون
- Village
- Location within Iran
- Coordinates: 36°19′44″N 49°23′38″E
- Country: Iran
- Province: Zanjan
- County: Abhar
- District: Central
- Rural District: Howmeh

Population (2016)
  - Total: 14
- Time zone: UTC+3:30 (IRST)

Qeshlaq-e Marshun (Persian: قشلاق مرشون) (Note: Also romanized as Qeshlāq-e Marshūn) is a village in Howmeh Rural District of the Central District in Abhar County, Zanjan province, Iran.

== Demographics ==
=== Population ===
At the time of the 2006 National Census, the village's population was 15 in four households. The village did not appear in the following census of 2011. The 2016 census measured the population of the village as 14 people in six households.
