= Nurin, Iran =

Village in Zanjan province, Iran

Nurin Persian: نورين
- Village
- Location within Iran
- Coordinates: 36°06′36″N 49°16′50″E
- Country: Iran
- Province: Zanjan
- County: Abhar
- District: Central
- Rural District: Howmeh

Population (2016)
  - Total: 1,961
- Time zone: UTC+3:30 (IRST)

Nurin (Persian: نورين) (Note: Also romanized as Nūrīn; also known as Narūn and Nurun) is a village in, and the capital of, Howmeh Rural District in the Central District of Abhar County, Zanjan province, Iran. The previous capital of the rural district was the village of Sharifabad.

== Demographics ==
=== Population ===
At the time of the 2006 National Census, the village's population was 2,088 in 550 households. The following census in 2011 counted 2,133 people in 658 households. The 2016 census measured the population of the village as 1,961 people in 650 households.
