= Davudgar =

Village in Zanjan province, Iran

Davudgar Persian: داودگر
- Village
- Location within Iran
- Coordinates: 36°19′51″N 49°16′49″E
- Country: Iran
- Province: Zanjan
- County: Abhar
- District: Central
- Rural District: Howmeh

Population (2016)
  - Total: 63
- Time zone: UTC+3:30 (IRST)

Davudgar (Persian: داودگر) (Note: Also romanized as Dāvūdgar) is a village in Howmeh Rural District of the Central District in Abhar County, Zanjan province, Iran.

== Demographics ==
=== Population ===
At the time of the 2006 National Census, the village's population was 79 in 12 households. The following census in 2011 counted 43 people in 10 households. The 2016 census measured the population of the village as 63 people in 26 households.
