= Dowlatabad, Zanjan =

Village in Zanjan province, Iran

Dowlatabad Persian: دولت اباد
- Village
- Location within Iran
- Coordinates: 35°58′30″N 49°07′42″E
- Country: Iran
- Province: Zanjan
- County: Abhar
- District: Central
- Rural District: Dowlatabad

Population (2016)
  - Total: 252
- Time zone: UTC+3:30 (IRST)

Dowlatabad (Persian: دولت اباد) (Note: Also romanized as Daulatābād and Dowlatābād) is a village in, and the capital of, Dowlatabad Rural District in the Central District of Abhar County, Zanjan province, Iran.

== Demographics ==
=== Population ===
At the time of the 2006 National Census, the village's population was 440 in 107 households. The following census in 2011 counted 297 people in 89 households. The 2016 census measured the population of the village as 252 people in 79 households.
