= Shekar Cheshmeh =

Village in Zanjan province, Iran

Shekar Cheshmeh Persian: شكرچشمه
- Village
- Location within Iran
- Coordinates: 35°58′45″N 49°09′50″E
- Country: Iran
- Province: Zanjan
- County: Abhar
- District: Central
- Rural District: Dowlatabad

Population (2016)
  - Total: 31
- Time zone: UTC+3:30 (IRST)

Shekar Cheshmeh (Persian: شكرچشمه) is a village in Dowlatabad Rural District of the Central District in Abhar County, Zanjan province, Iran.

== Demographics ==
=== Population ===
At the time of the 2006 National Census, the village's population was 45 in nine households. The following census in 2011 counted 38 people in 10 households. The 2016 census measured the population of the village as 31 people in seven households.
