= Arhan, Iran =

Village in Zanjan province, Iran

Arhan Persian: ارهان
- Village
- Location within Iran
- Coordinates: 36°18′46″N 48°54′43″E
- Country: Iran
- Province: Zanjan
- County: Abhar
- District: Central
- Rural District: Sain Qaleh

Population (2016)
  - Total: 1,017
- Time zone: UTC+3:30 (IRST)

Arhan (Persian: ارهان) (Note: Also romanized as Arahān and Arhān; also known as Arkhan) is a village in Sain Qaleh Rural District of the Central District in Abhar County, Zanjan province, Iran.

== Demographics ==
=== Population ===
At the time of the 2006 National Census, the village's population was 1,077 in 238 households. The following census in 2011 counted 1,082 people in 343 households. The 2016 census measured the population of the village as 1,017 people in 308 households.
