= Gollejeh, Abhar =

Village in Zanjan province, Iran

Gollejeh Persian: گلجه
- Village
- Location within Iran
- Coordinates: 36°10′57″N 49°24′47″E
- Country: Iran
- Province: Zanjan
- County: Abhar
- District: Central
- Rural District: Howmeh

Population (2016)
  - Total: 47
- Time zone: UTC+3:30 (IRST)

Gollejeh (Persian: گلجه) (Note: Also romanized as Goljeh and Gollejeh; also known as Kulidzha and Kulija) is a village in Howmeh Rural District of the Central District in Abhar County, Zanjan province, Iran.

== Demographics ==
=== Population ===
At the time of the 2006 National Census, the village's population was 68 in 19 households. The following census in 2011 counted 56 people in 17 households. The 2016 census measured the population of the village as 47 people in 15 households.
