= Hesar-e Abd ol Karim =

Village in Zanjan province, Iran

Hesar-e Abd ol Karim Persian: حصارعبدالکریم
- Village
- Location within Iran
- Coordinates: 36°17′24″N 49°19′34″E
- Country: Iran
- Province: Zanjan
- County: Abhar
- District: Central
- Rural District: Howmeh

Population (2016)
  - Total: 18
- Time zone: UTC+3:30 (IRST)

Hesar-e Abd ol Karim (Persian: حصارعبدالکریم) (Note: Also romanized as Ḩeşār ‘Abd ol Karīm, Ḩesār-e ‘Abd ol Karīm, and Ḩeşār-e ‘Abd ol Karīm; also known as Gisar, Ḩeşār, and Hisār) is a village in Howmeh Rural District of the Central District in Abhar County, Zanjan province, Iran.

== Demographics ==
=== Population ===
At the time of the 2006 National Census, the village's population was 64 in 16 households. The following census in 2011 counted 48 people in 12 households. The 2016 census measured the population of the village as 18 people in seven households.
