= Shivarin =

Village in Zanjan province, Iran

Shivarin Persian: شيورين
- Village
- Location within Iran
- Coordinates: 36°00′13″N 49°15′42″E
- Country: Iran
- Province: Zanjan
- County: Abhar
- District: Central
- Rural District: Darsajin

Population (2016)
  - Total: 103
- Time zone: UTC+3:30 (IRST)

Shivarin (Persian: شيورين) (Note: Also romanized as Shīvarīn and Shīverīn; also known as Shavarīn and Shawārin) is a village in Darsajin Rural District of the Central District in Abhar County, Zanjan province, Iran.

== Demographics ==
=== Population ===
At the time of the 2006 National Census, the village's population was 124 in 35 households. The following census in 2011 counted 105 people in 34 households. The 2016 census measured the population of the village as 103 people in 36 households.
