= Aliabad, Abhar =

Village in Zanjan province, Iran

Aliabad Persian: علی‌آباد
- Village
- Location within Iran
- Coordinates: 36°07′28″N 49°22′57″E
- Country: Iran
- Province: Zanjan
- County: Abhar
- District: Central
- Rural District: Howmeh

Population (2016)
  - Total: 23
- Time zone: UTC+3:30 (IRST)

Aliabad (Persian: علی‌آباد) (Note: Also romanized as ‘Alīābād) is a village in Howmeh Rural District of the Central District in Abhar County, Zanjan province, Iran.

== Demographics ==
=== Population ===
At the time of the 2006 National Census, the village's population was 32 in five households. The following census in 2011 counted 29 people in eight households. The 2016 census measured the population of the village as 23 people in 11 households.
