= Kalleh Khaneh =

Village in Zanjan province, Iran

Kalleh Khaneh Persian: كله خانه
- Village
- Location within Iran
- Coordinates: 36°18′38″N 49°20′40″E
- Country: Iran
- Province: Zanjan
- County: Abhar
- District: Central
- Rural District: Howmeh

Population (2016)
  - Total: 26
- Time zone: UTC+3:30 (IRST)

Kalleh Khaneh (Persian: كله خانه) (Note: Also romanized as Kalleh Khāneh, Kolah Khāneh, and Koleh Khāneh; also known as Galeh Khāneh, Kholakhāneh, Kulagkhaneg, and Kulahkhaneh) is a village in Howmeh Rural District of the Central District in Abhar County, Zanjan province, Iran.

== Demographics ==
=== Population ===
At the time of the 2006 National Census, the village's population was 29 in 13 households. The following census in 2011 counted 27 people in eight households. The 2016 census measured the population of the village as 26 people in eight households.
