= Qamchabad =

Village in Zanjan province, Iran

Qamchabad Persian: قمچ اباد
- Village
- Location within Iran
- Coordinates: 36°04′53″N 49°19′50″E
- Country: Iran
- Province: Zanjan
- County: Abhar
- District: Central
- Rural District: Howmeh

Population (2016)
  - Total: 328
- Time zone: UTC+3:30 (IRST)

Qamchabad (Persian: قمچ اباد) (Note: Also romanized as Qamchābād; also known as Kamuchabad, Karichivar, Qomīshābād, Qomshāhābād, and Qumshāhābād) is a village in Howmeh Rural District of the Central District in Abhar County, Zanjan province, Iran.

== Demographics ==
=== Population ===
At the time of the 2006 National Census, the village's population was 561 in 154 households. The following census in 2011 counted 475 people in 138 households. The 2016 census measured the population of the village as 328 people in 113 households.
