= Aqcheh Kand, Zanjan =

Village in Zanjan province, Iran

Aqcheh Kand Persian: آقچه‌کند
- Village
- Location within Iran
- Coordinates: 36°00′06″N 49°13′29″E
- Country: Iran
- Province: Zanjan
- County: Abhar
- District: Central
- Rural District: Darsajin

Population (2016)
  - Total: 122
- Time zone: UTC+3:30 (IRST)

Aqcheh Kand (Persian: آقچه‌کند) (Note: Also romanized as Āqcheh Kand) is a village in Darsajin Rural District of the Central District in Abhar County, Zanjan province, Iran.

== Demographics ==
=== Population ===
At the time of the 2006 National Census, the village's population was 145 in 43 households. The following census in 2011 counted 137 people in 50 households. The 2016 census measured the population of the village as 122 people in 41 households.
