= Yeylaq Marshun =

Village in Zanjan province, Iran

Yeylaq Marshun Persian: ييلاق مرشون
- Village
- Location within Iran
- Coordinates: 36°18′11″N 49°23′34″E
- Country: Iran
- Province: Zanjan
- County: Abhar
- District: Central
- Rural District: Howmeh

Population (2016)
  - Total: 297
- Time zone: UTC+3:30 (IRST)

Yeylaq Marshun (Persian: ييلاق مرشون) (Note: Also romanized as Yeylāq Marshūn; also known as Marchīn, Marchon, Marchūn, Margun, and Marshūn) is a village in Howmeh Rural District of the Central District in Abhar County, Zanjan province, Iran.

== Demographics ==
=== Population ===
At the time of the 2006 National Census, the village's population was 432 in 77 households. The following census in 2011 counted 403 people in 93 households. The 2016 census measured the population of the village as 297 people in 85 households.
