= Khvoshnam, Zanjan =

Village in Zanjan province, Iran

Khvoshnam Persian: خوشنام
- Village
- Location within Iran
- Coordinates: 35°59′09″N 48°57′34″E
- Country: Iran
- Province: Zanjan
- County: Abhar
- District: Central
- Rural District: Dowlatabad

Population (2016)
  - Total: 288
- Time zone: UTC+3:30 (IRST)

Khvoshnam (Persian: خوشنام) (Note: Also romanized as Khowshnām, Khushnām, and Khvoshnām; also known as Khvoshnāmī) is a village in Dowlatabad Rural District of the Central District in Abhar County, Zanjan province, Iran.

== Demographics ==
=== Population ===
At the time of the 2006 National Census, the village's population was 487 in 100 households. The following census in 2011 counted 362 people in 96 households. The 2016 census measured the population of the village as 288 people in 72 households.
