= Razmejin =

Village in Zanjan province, Iran

Razmejin Persian: رازمجين
- Village
- Location within Iran
- Coordinates: 36°02′06″N 49°10′41″E
- Country: Iran
- Province: Zanjan
- County: Abhar
- District: Central
- Rural District: Darsajin

Population (2016)
  - Total: 97
- Time zone: UTC+3:30 (IRST)

Razmejin (Persian: رازمجين) (Note: Also romanized as Rāzemajīn, Rāzmajīn, Rāzmejīn, and Rāẕmejīn; also known as Azmaḩīn, Mazārtajīn, Rāẕīmejīn, Riamagin, and Rizmagin) is a village in Darsajin Rural District of the Central District in Abhar County, Zanjan province, Iran.

== Demographics ==
=== Population ===
There were 127 residents living in 29 homes in the village as of the 2006 National Census. 30 homes with 103 residents were counted in the 2011 census. According to the 2016 census, there were 32 homes and 97 residents in the village.
