= Chang Almas =

Village in Zanjan province, Iran

Chang Almas Persian: چنگ الماس
- Village
- Location within Iran
- Coordinates: 36°00′15″N 49°05′32″E
- Country: Iran
- Province: Zanjan
- County: Abhar
- District: Central
- Rural District: Dowlatabad

Population (2016)
  - Total: 426
- Time zone: UTC+3:30 (IRST)

Chang Almas (Persian: چنگ الماس) (Note: Also romanized as Chang Almās; also known as Changamās, Changarmās, and Changmās) is a village in Dowlatabad Rural District of the Central District in Abhar County, Zanjan province, Iran.

== Demographics ==
=== Population ===
At the time of the 2006 National Census, the village's population was 767 in 163 households. The following census in 2011 counted 567 people in 158 households. The 2016 census measured the population of the village as 426 people in 120 households. It was the most populous village in its rural district.
