= Darsajin =

Village in Zanjan province, Iran

Darsajin Persian: درسجين
- Village
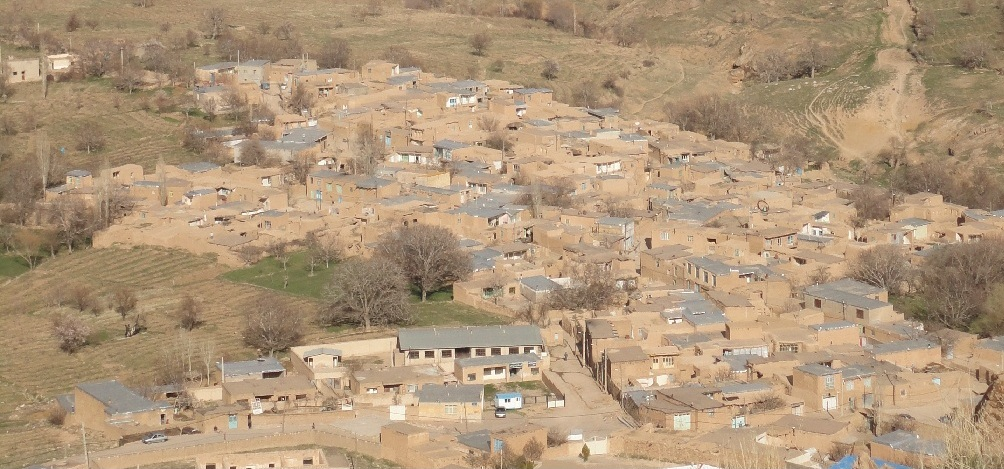
- Darsajin

- Location within Iran
- Coordinates: 36°01′16″N 49°14′24″E
- Country: Iran
- Province: Zanjan
- County: Abhar
- District: Central
- Rural District: Darsajin

Population (2016)
  - Total: 320
- Time zone: UTC+3:30 (IRST)

Darsajin (Persian: درسجين) (Note: Also romanized as Darsajīn; also known as Darehsajīn, Darsahīn, and Darsakhin) is a village in, and the capital of, Darsajin Rural District in the Central District of Abhar County, Zanjan province, Iran.

== Demographics ==
=== Language ===
The language of the people of the village is Lori Bakhtiari, which itself originated from ancient Persian

=== Population ===
At the time of the 2006 National Census, the village's population was 549 in 168 households. The following census in 2011 counted 437 people in 150 households. The 2016 census measured the population of the village as 320 people in 125 households. It was the most populous village in its rural district.
