= Barzabil =

Village in Zanjan province, Iran

Barzabil Persian: برزابيل
- Village
- Location within Iran
- Coordinates: 36°11′27″N 49°21′47″E
- Country: Iran
- Province: Zanjan
- County: Abhar
- District: Central
- Rural District: Howmeh

Population (2016)
  - Total: 30
- Time zone: UTC+3:30 (IRST)

Barzabil (Persian: برزابيل) (Note: Also romanized as Barzābīl; also known as Barzabul) is a village in Howmeh Rural District of the Central District in Abhar County, Zanjan province, Iran.

== Demographics ==
=== Population ===
At the time of the 2006 National Census, the village's population was 22 in eight households. The following census in 2011 counted 35 people in 11 households. The 2016 census measured the population of the village as 30 people in 10 households.
