= Arkin =

Arkin may refer to:

- Arkin, Iran, a village in Zanjan Province, Iran
- Arkin, Khodabandeh, a village in Zanjan Province, Iran
- Adam Arkin (born 1956), American actor and director
- Alan Arkin (1934–2023), American actor
- Esther Arkin, Israeli–American mathematician and computer scientist
- Shy Arkin (born 1965), Israeli professor of biochemistry
- Cüneyt Arkın (1937–2022), Turkish film actor, director, producer and martial artist.
- Tanner Arkin (born 2003), American football player

== See also ==
- Arka (disambiguation)
- Arkinda, Arkansas
