= Quhajin =

Village in Zanjan province, Iran

Quhajin Persian: قوهجين
- Village
- Location within Iran
- Coordinates: 36°05′34″N 49°09′56″E
- Country: Iran
- Province: Zanjan
- County: Abhar
- District: Central
- Rural District: Darsajin

Population (2016)
  - Total: 109
- Time zone: UTC+3:30 (IRST)

Quhajin (Persian: قوهجين) (Note: Also romanized as Qūhajīn; also known as Ghoohchin, Kūhak, Kuhnak, Kukhnak, Qowheyjīn, Qūhījīn, and Qūhjīn) is a village in Darsajin Rural District of the Central District in Abhar County, Zanjan province, Iran.

== Demographics ==
=== Population ===
At the time of the 2006 National Census, the village's population was 184 in 59 households. The following census in 2011 counted 158 people in 55 households. The 2016 census measured the population of the village as 109 people in 40 households.

== Infrastructure ==
The village has a small cemetery and a primary school.
