= Cheshmeh Bar =

Village in Zanjan province, Iran

Cheshmeh Bar Persian: چشمه بار
- Village
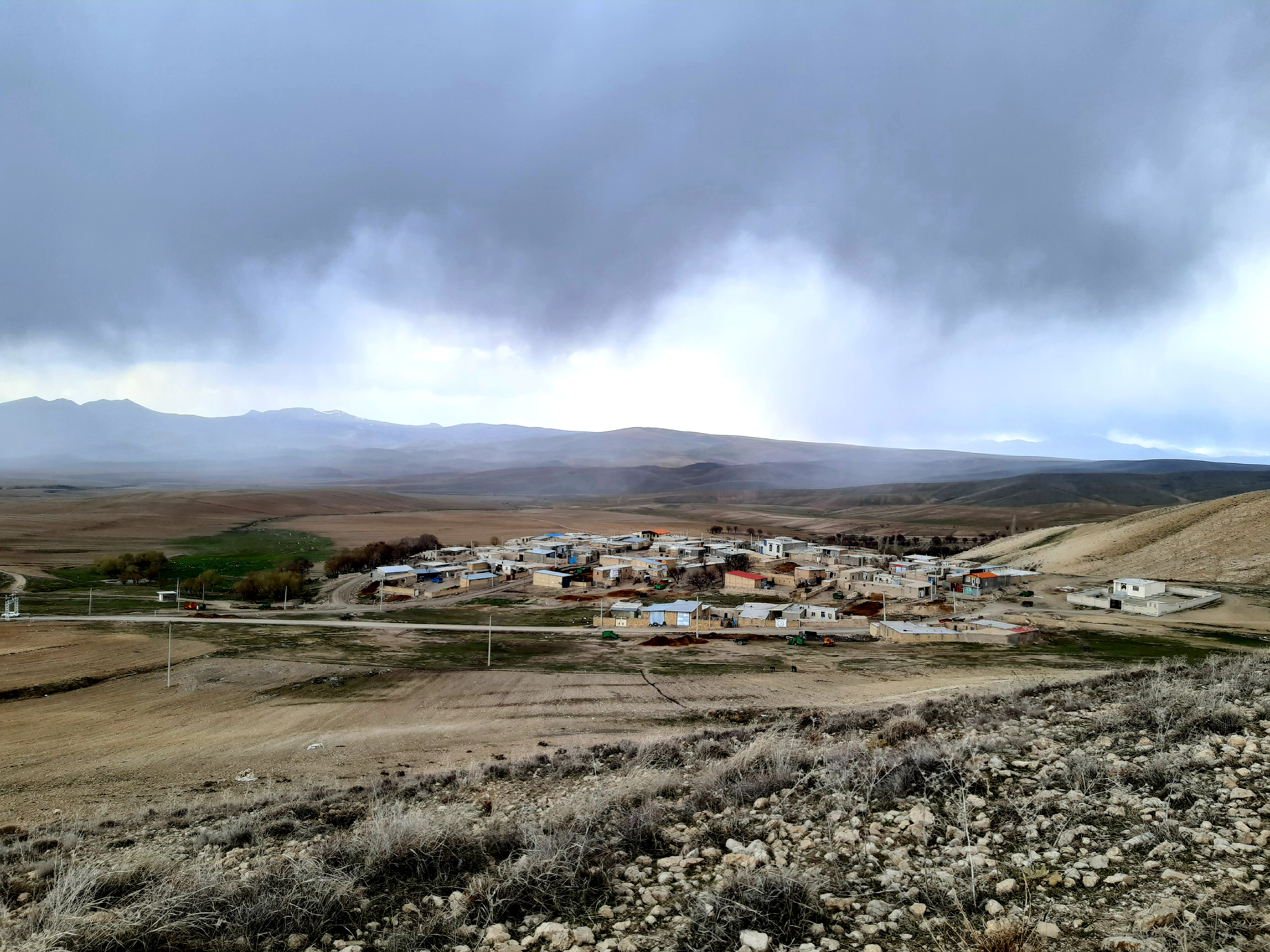
- The village of Cheshmeh Bar

- Location within Iran
- Coordinates: 35°57′09″N 49°02′22″E
- Country: Iran
- Province: Zanjan
- County: Abhar
- District: Central
- Rural District: Dowlatabad

Population (2016)
  - Total: 192
- Time zone: UTC+3:30 (IRST)

Cheshmeh Bar (Persian: چشمه بار) (Note: Also romanized as Chashmeh Bār and Cheshmeh Bār; also known as Chashmeh Bad) is a village in Dowlatabad Rural District of the Central District in Abhar County, Zanjan province, Iran.

== Demographics ==
=== Language ===
All of Cheshmeh Bar's people speak the Azerbaijani Turkish and Abhari dialect.

=== Population ===
At the time of the 2006 National Census, the village's population was 234 in 58 households. The following census in 2011 counted 203 people in 61 households. The 2016 census measured the population of the village as 192 people in 60 households.

== Occupations ==
The people of this village are farmers and cattle breeders.

== Crops ==
Grapes, wheat, barley and almonds are the main products of this village.

== Gallery ==
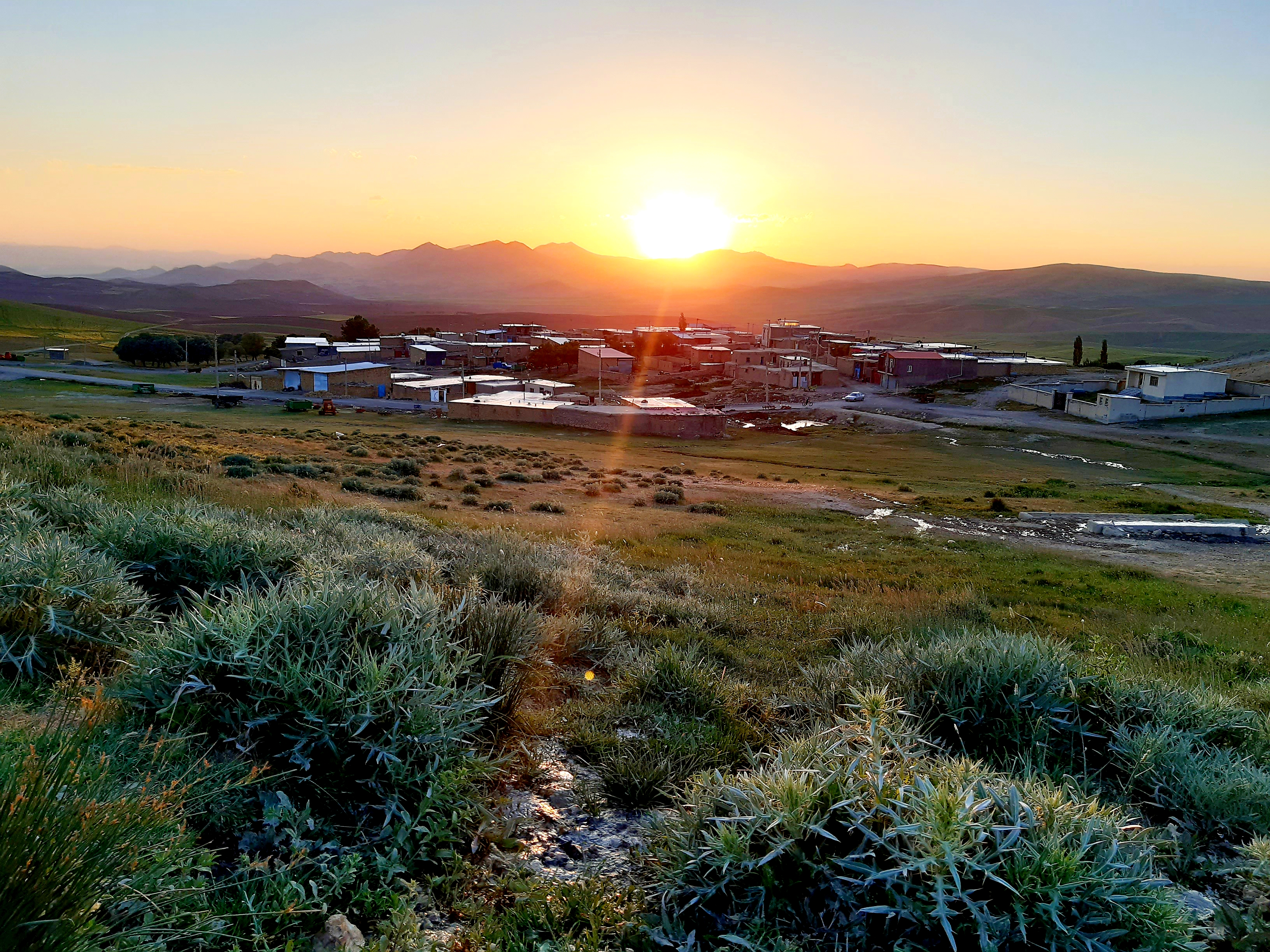

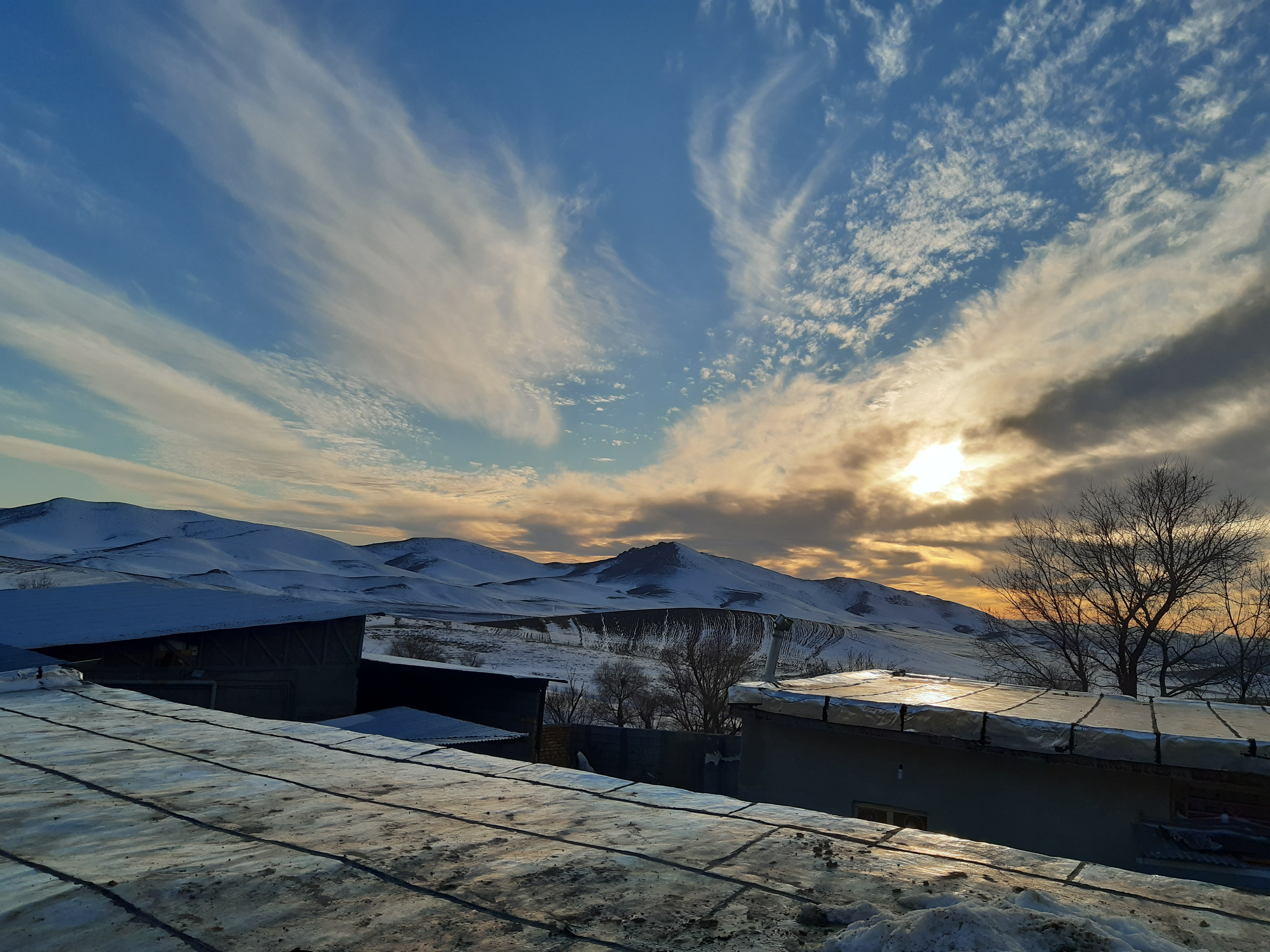

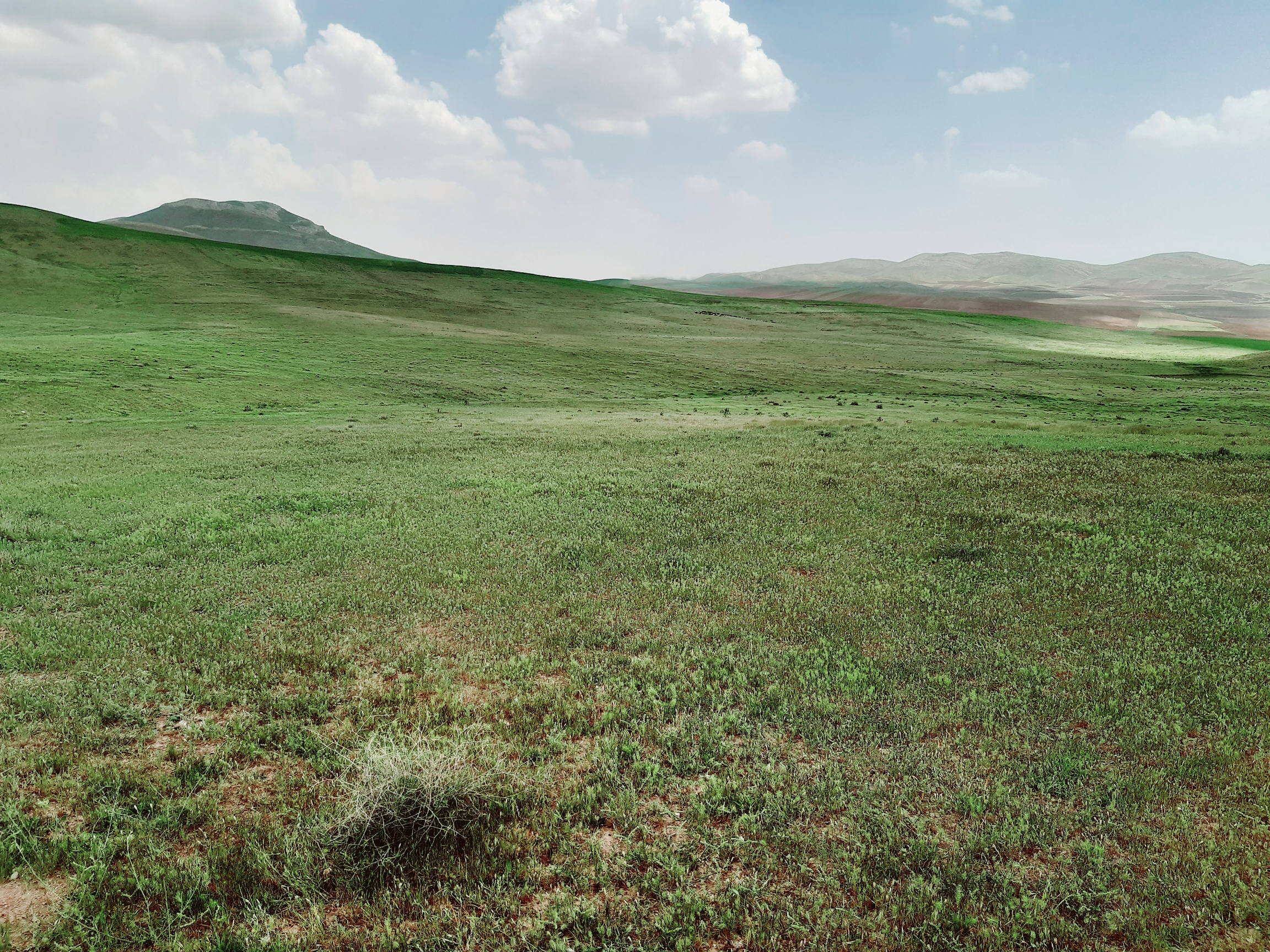

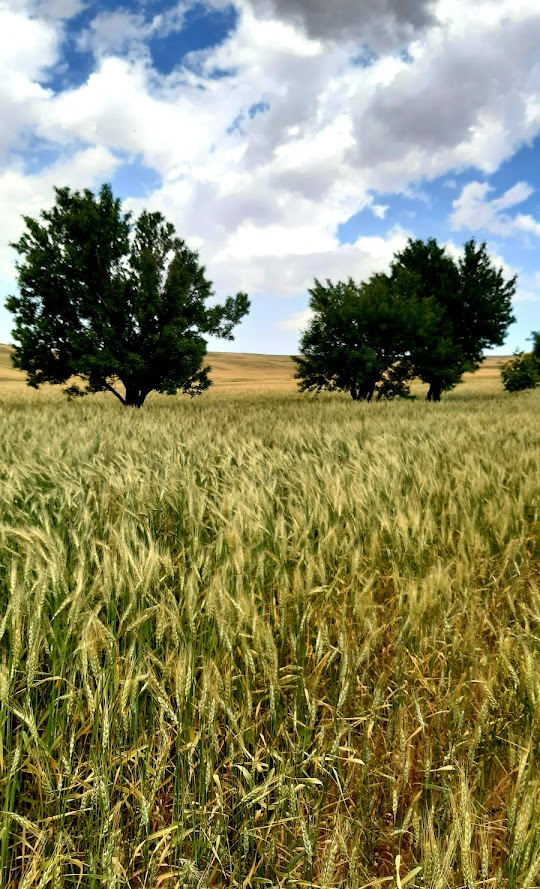
