= Eyvanak =

Village in Zanjan province, Iran

Eyvanak Persian: ايوانك
- Village
- Location within Iran
- Coordinates: 36°01′05″N 49°05′01″E
- Country: Iran
- Province: Zanjan
- County: Abhar
- District: Central
- Rural District: Dowlatabad

Population (2016)
  - Total: 242
- Time zone: UTC+3:30 (IRST)

Eyvanak (Persian: ايوانك) (Note: Also romanized as Aiwānak, Ayvanak, and Eyvānak) is a village in Dowlatabad Rural District of the Central District in Abhar County, Zanjan province, Iran.

== Demographics ==
=== Population ===
At the time of the 2006 National Census, the village's population was 444 in 99 households. The following census in 2011 counted 296 people in 89 households. The 2016 census measured the population of the village as 242 people in 68 households.
