= Queyujuq =

Village in Zanjan province, Iran

Queyujuq Persian: قويوجوق
- Village
- Location within Iran
- Coordinates: 36°08′24″N 49°21′18″E
- Country: Iran
- Province: Zanjan
- County: Abhar
- District: Central
- Rural District: Howmeh

Population (2016)
  - Total: 18
- Time zone: UTC+3:30 (IRST)

Queyujuq (Persian: قويوجوق) (Note: Also romanized as Qūeyūjūq; also known as Guyudzhu, Gūyūju, and Qeyūjūq; formerly known as Qūyjūq Khān (قویوجوق‌خان)) is a village in Howmeh Rural District of the Central District in Abhar County, Zanjan province, Iran.

== Demographics ==
=== Population ===
At the time of the 2006 National Census, the village's population was nine in four households. The following census in 2011 counted 15 people in four households. The 2016 census measured the population of the village as 18 people in five households.
