= Chargar =

Village in Zanjan province, Iran

Chargar چرگر
- Village
- Location within Iran
- Coordinates: 36°25′14″N 49°02′47″E
- Country: Iran
- Province: Zanjan
- County: Abhar
- District: Central
- Rural District: Sain Qaleh

Population (2016)
  - Total: 866
- Time zone: UTC+3:30 (IRST)

Chargar (Persian: چرگر) (Note: Also known as Charkar) is a village in Sain Qaleh Rural District of the Central District in Abhar County, Zanjan province, Iran.

== Demographics ==
=== Population ===
At the time of the 2006 National Census, the village's population was 853 in 238 households. The following census in 2011 counted 760 people in 237 households. The 2016 census measured the population of the village as 866 people in 278 households.

== Overview ==
Chargar is the site of epithermal metal ore deposits, which consist primarily of chalcopyrite and gold. The main gangue minerals are quartz, barite, and calcite. The ores are embedded in Eocene volcanic rocks which are classified as andesitic tuff and associated with the Karaj Formation. The Chargar deposit has similarities to the Khalifehlu and Aliabad-Khanchay deposits.
