= Dash Bolagh, Abhar =

Village in Zanjan province, Iran

Dash Bolagh Persian: داشبلاغ
- Village
- Location within Iran
- Coordinates: 36°17′05″N 49°00′40″E
- Country: Iran
- Province: Zanjan
- County: Abhar
- District: Central
- Rural District: Sain Qaleh

Population (2016)
  - Total: 193
- Time zone: UTC+3:30 (IRST)

Dash Bolagh (Persian: داشبلاغ) (Note: Also romanized as Dāsh Bolāgh; also known as Dashbulak and Dāshbulāq) is a village in Sain Qaleh Rural District of the Central District in Abhar County, Zanjan province, Iran.

== Demographics ==
=== Population ===
At the time of the 2006 National Census, the village's population was 355 in 81 households. The following census in 2011 counted 317 people in 81 households. The 2016 census measured the population of the village as 193 people in 59 households.
