= Qarluq, Abhar =

Village in Zanjan province, Iran

Qarluq Persian: قارلوق
- Village
- Location within Iran
- Coordinates: 36°13′44″N 49°18′31″E
- Country: Iran
- Province: Zanjan
- County: Abhar
- District: Central
- Rural District: Howmeh

Population (2016)
  - Total: 123
- Time zone: UTC+3:30 (IRST)

Qarluq (Persian: قارلوق) (Note: Also romanized as Qārlūq; also known as Karlikh and Qārloq) is a village in Howmeh Rural District of the Central District in Abhar County, Zanjan province, Iran.

== Demographics ==
=== Population ===
At the time of the 2006 National Census, the village's population was 186 in 37 households. The following census in 2011 counted 156 people in 38 households. The 2016 census measured the population of the village as 123 people in 35 households.
