= Gav Darreh, Zanjan =

Village in Zanjan province, Iran

Gav Darreh Persian: گاودره
- Village
- Location within Iran
- Coordinates: 36°20′32″N 49°08′30″E
- Country: Iran
- Province: Zanjan
- County: Abhar
- District: Central
- Rural District: Sain Qaleh

Population (2016)
  - Total: 309
- Time zone: UTC+3:30 (IRST)

Gav Darreh (Persian: گاودره) (Note: Also romanized as Gāv Dareh and Gāv Darreh; also known as Gavādar, Gavadar, Gawādar, and Savār Dāreh) is a village in Sain Qaleh Rural District of the Central District in Abhar County, Zanjan province, Iran.

== Demographics ==
=== Population ===
At the time of the 2006 National Census, the village's population was 386 in 95 households. The following census in 2011 counted 332 people in 107 households. The 2016 census measured the population of the village as 309 people in 91 households.
