= Khalifeh Hesar =

Village in Zanjan province, Iran

Khalifeh Hesar Persian: خليفه حصار
- Village
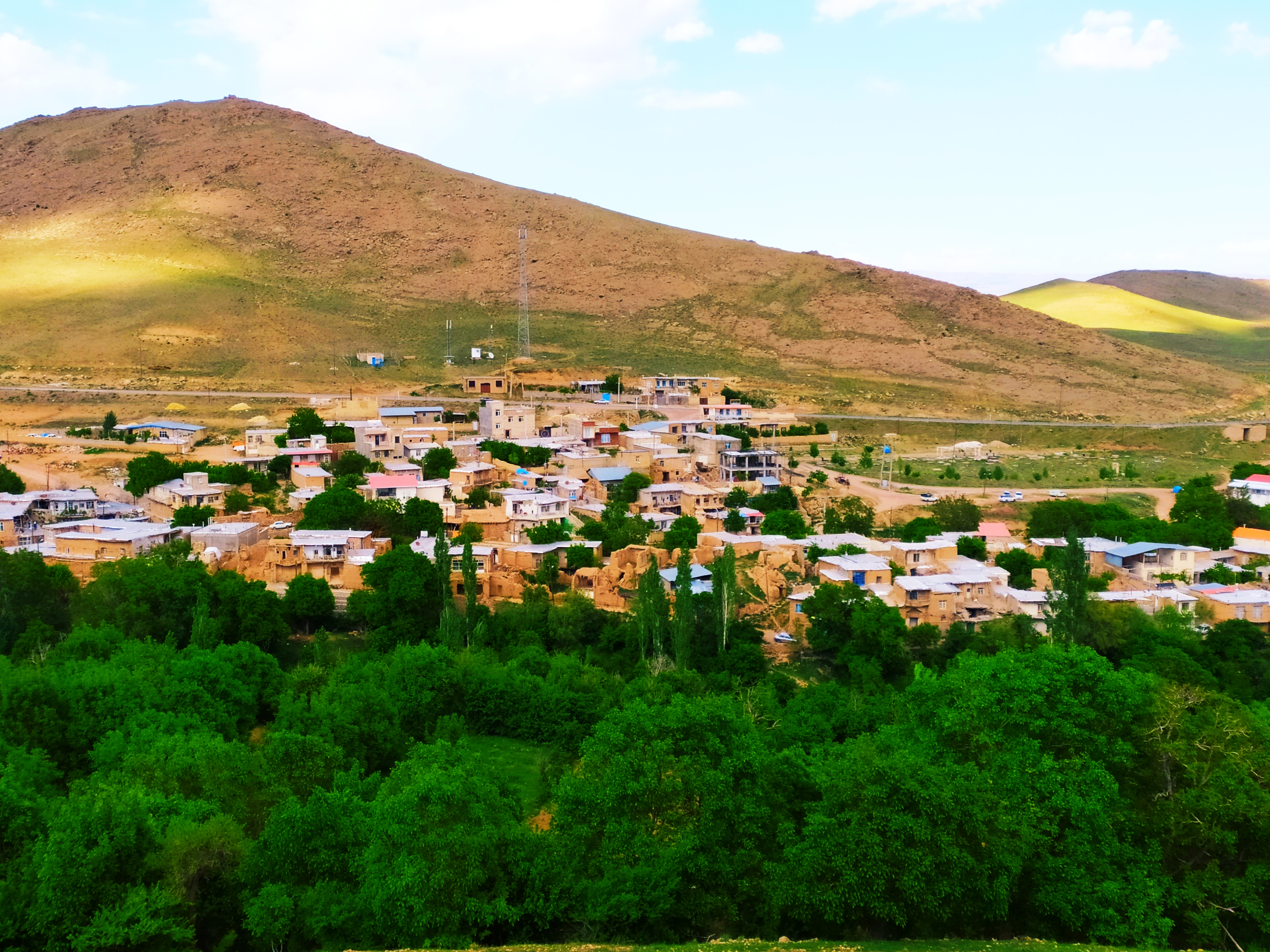
- The village of Khalifeh Hesar

- Location within Iran
- Coordinates: 36°01′05″N 49°12′35″E
- Country: Iran
- Province: Zanjan
- County: Abhar
- District: Central
- Rural District: Darsajin
- Established: Before Islam (Note: According to the ancient shrine of this village, from which several ancient artifacts have been discovered)

Population (2016)
  - Total: 77
- Time zone: UTC+3:30 (IRST)

Khalifeh Hesar (Persian: خليفه حصار) (Note: Also romanized as Khalīfeh Ḩeşār; also known as Khalfasar, Khalf-e Sār, Khalīfeh Ḩeşār va Mīlān (خليفه حصار و ميلان), and Khalīfeh Ḩeşār-e Mīlān) is a village in Darsajin Rural District of the Central District in Abhar County, Zanjan province, Iran.

== Demographics ==
=== Population ===
At the time of the 2006 National Census, the village's population was 192 in 51 households. The following census in 2011 counted 130 people in 46 households. The 2016 census measured the population of the village as 77 people in 37 households.

== Antiquities ==
The ancient cemetery of this village called White Hill, which belongs to the Seljuk era, has been registered in the list of national monuments of Iran.

== Weather ==
Khalifeh Hesar

Climate chart (precipitation, max. and min. temperature)
J	F	M	A	M	J	J	A	S	O	N	D
28 −3 −10	31 1 −8	39 17 −3	32 22 2	29 29 8	4 40 13	15 41 15	4 43 16	2 37 12	31 28 5	51 14 −1	50 5 −6
- █ Average max. and min. temperatures in °C
- █ Precipitation totals in mm
- Source: سازمان هواشناسی کشور
Imperial conversion
J	F	M	A	M	J	J	A	S	O	N	D
1.1 27 14	1.2 34 18	1.5 63 27	1.3 72 36	1.1 84 46	0.2 104 55	0.6 106 59	0.2 109 61	0.1 99 54	1.2 82 41	2 57 30	2 41 21
- █ Average max. and min. temperatures in °F
- █ Precipitation totals in inches

== Gallery ==
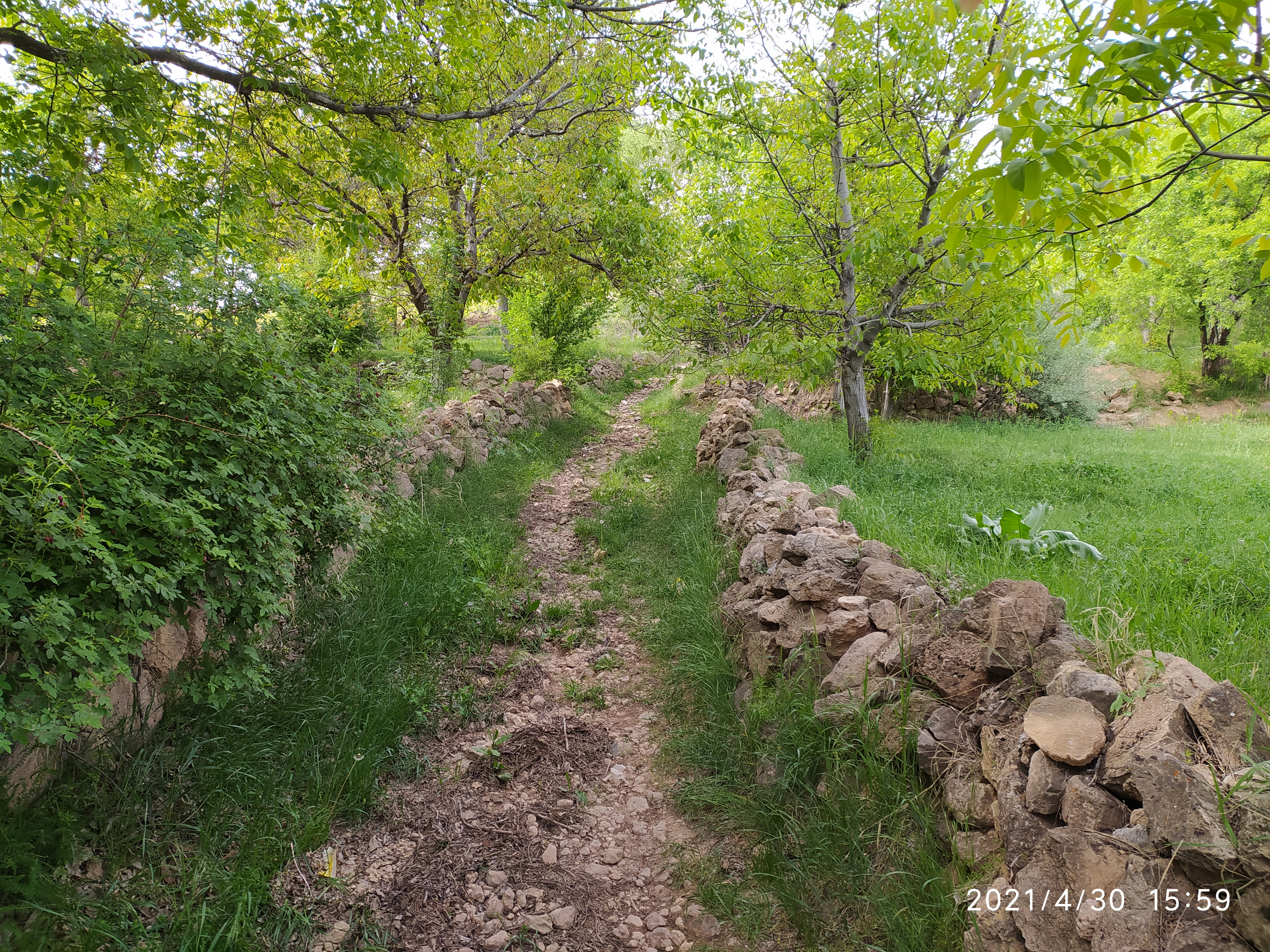
Khalifeh Hesar Alley

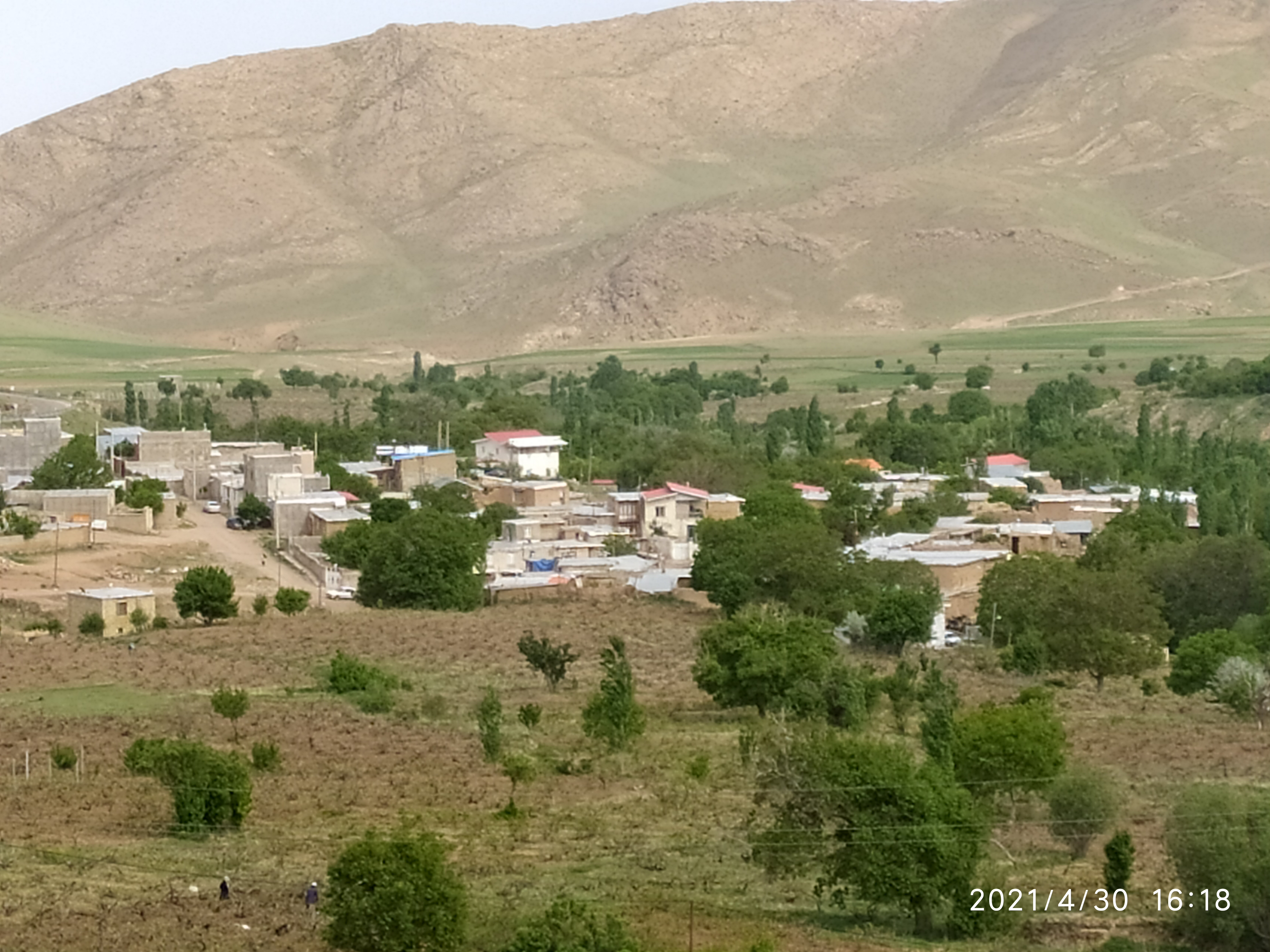
On top of the surrounding mountains

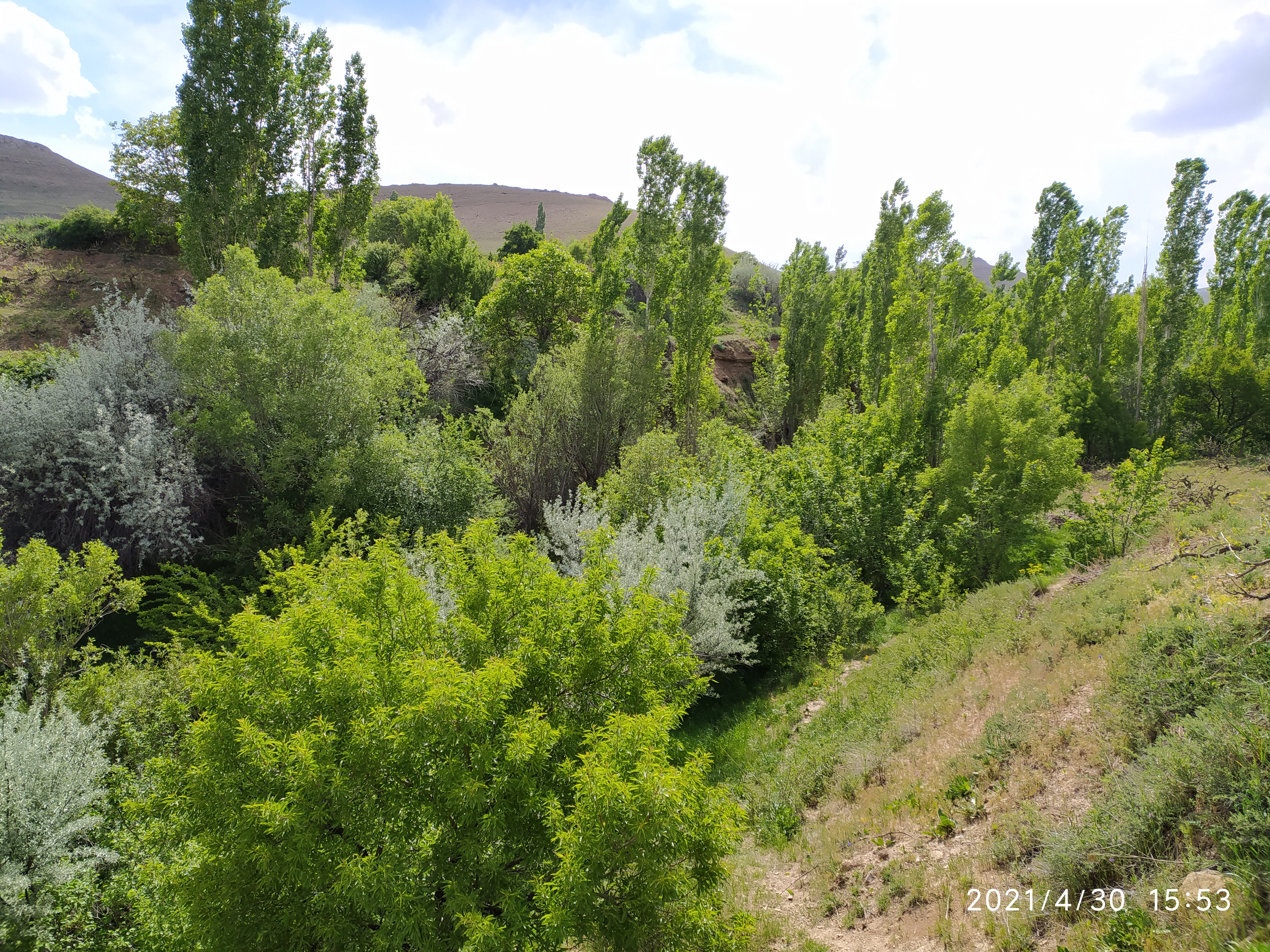
Natural landscape of trees
