= Aznab, Zanjan =

Village in Zanjan province, Iran

Aznab Persian: ازناب
- Village
- Location within Iran
- Coordinates: 36°03′19″N 49°12′52″E
- Country: Iran
- Province: Zanjan
- County: Abhar
- District: Central
- Rural District: Darsajin

Population (2016)
  - Total: 61
- Time zone: UTC+3:30 (IRST)

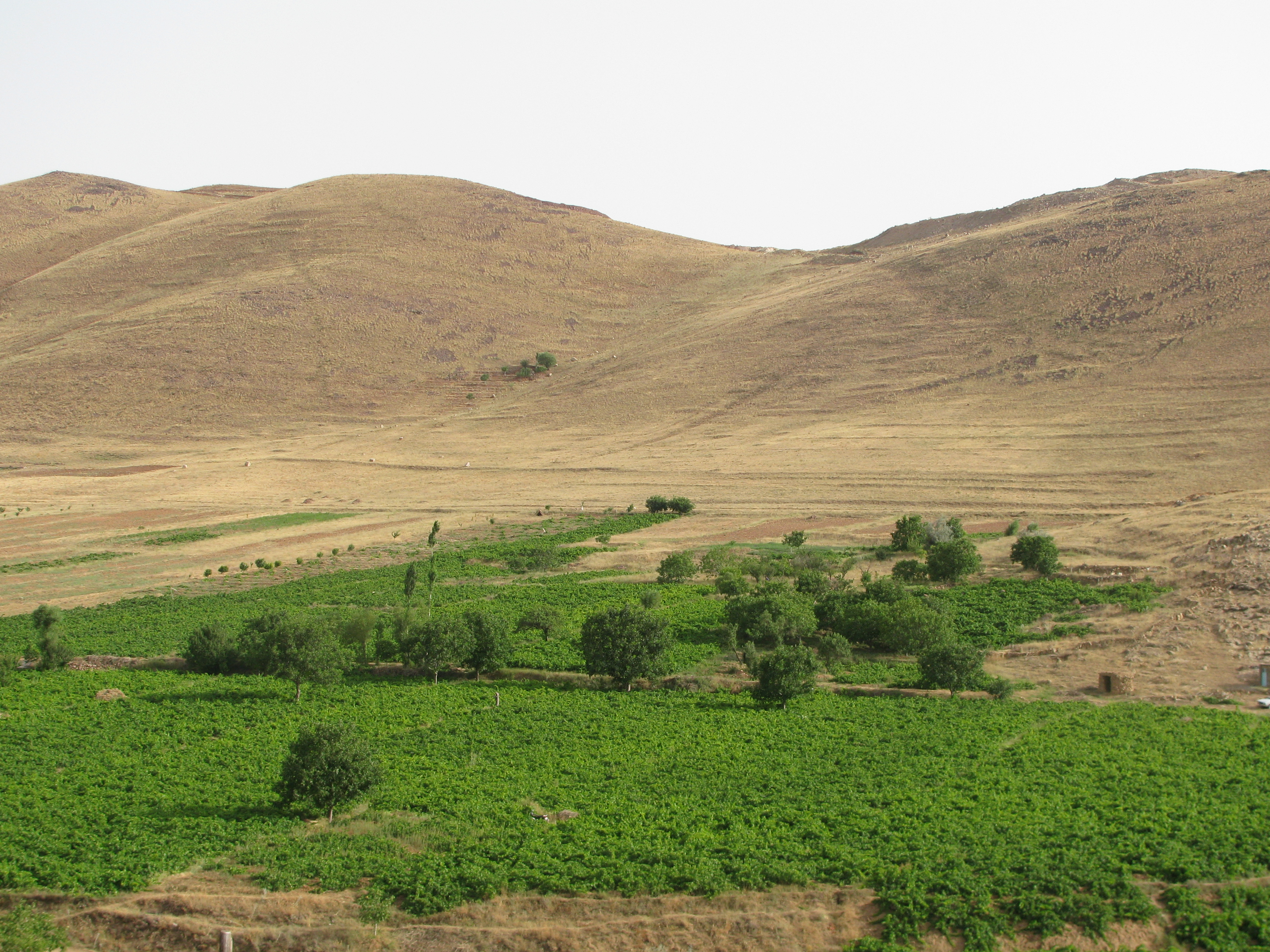
Fields in Aznab

Aznab (Persian: ازناب) (Note: Also romanized as Aznāb and Eznāb; also known as Aznau, Aznow, and Az̄nū) is a village in Darsajin Rural District of the Central District in Abhar County, Zanjan province, Iran.

== Demographics ==
=== Population ===
At the time of the 2006 National Census, the village's population was 137 in 58 households. The following census in 2011 counted 136 people in 65 households. The 2016 census measured the population of the village as 61 people in 26 households.
