= Asadabad, Abhar =

Village in Zanjan province, Iran

Asadabad Persian: اسدآباد
- Village
- Location within Iran
- Coordinates: 36°12′34″N 49°19′30″E
- Country: Iran
- Province: Zanjan
- County: Abhar
- District: Central
- Rural District: Howmeh

Population (2016)
  - Total: 61
- Time zone: UTC+3:30 (IRST)

Asadabad (Persian: اسدآباد) (Note: Also romanized as Asadābād; also known as Azadabad) is a village in Howmeh Rural District of the Central District in Abhar County, Zanjan province, Iran.

== Demographics ==
=== Population ===
At the time of the 2006 National Census, the village's population was 90 in 21 households. The following census in 2011 counted 69 people in 21 households. The 2016 census measured the population of the village as 61 people in 21 households.
