= Komajin =

Village in Zanjan province, Iran

Komajin Persian: كماجين
- Village
- Location within Iran
- Coordinates: 36°16′03″N 49°21′54″E
- Country: Iran
- Province: Zanjan
- County: Abhar
- District: Central
- Rural District: Howmeh

Population (2016)
  - Total: 55
- Time zone: UTC+3:30 (IRST)

Komajin (Persian: كماجين) (Note: Also romanized as Komājīn; also known as Komājīn Yeylāq) is a village in Howmeh Rural District of the Central District in Abhar County, Zanjan province, Iran.

== Demographics ==
=== Population ===
At the time of the 2006 National Census, the village's population was 20 in six households. The village did not appear in the following census of 2011. The 2016 census measured the population of the village as 55 people in 16 households.
