= Bahavar =

Village in Zanjan province, Iran

Bahavar Persian: بهاور
- Village
- Location within Iran
- Coordinates: 36°22′54″N 49°19′38″E
- Country: Iran
- Province: Zanjan
- County: Abhar
- District: Central
- Rural District: Howmeh

Population (2016)
  - Total: 44
- Time zone: UTC+3:30 (IRST)

Bahavar (Persian: بهاور) (Note: Also romanized as Bahāvar) is a village in Howmeh Rural District of the Central District in Abhar County, Zanjan province, Iran.

== Demographics ==
=== Population ===
At the time of the 2006 National Census, the village's population was 63 in 10 households. The following census in 2011 counted 55 people in 14 households. The 2016 census measured the population of the village as 44 people in 13 households.
