= Amidabad =

Village in Zanjan province, Iran

Amidabad Persian: عميداباد
- Village
- Location within Iran
- Coordinates: 36°21′54″N 48°57′46″E
- Country: Iran
- Province: Zanjan
- County: Abhar
- District: Central
- Rural District: Sain Qaleh

Population (2016)
  - Total: 2,147
- Time zone: UTC+3:30 (IRST)

Amidabad (Persian: عميداباد) (Note: Also romanized as 'Amīdābād; also known as Amīrābād) is a village in, and the capital of, Sain Qaleh Rural District in the Central District of Abhar County, Zanjan province, Iran.

== Demographics ==
=== Population ===
At the time of the 2006 National Census, the village's population was 2,482 in 641 households. The following census in 2011 counted 2,483 people in 781 households. The 2016 census measured the population of the village as 2,147 people in 724 households. It was the most populous village in its rural district.
