= Algazir =

Village in Zanjan province, Iran

Algazir Persian: الگزير
- Village
- Location within Iran
- Coordinates: 36°17′55″N 48°56′23″E
- Country: Iran
- Province: Zanjan
- County: Abhar
- District: Central
- Rural District: Sain Qaleh

Population (2016)
  - Total: 1,957
- Time zone: UTC+3:30 (IRST)

Algazir (Persian: الگزير) (Note: Also romanized as Ālgazīr, Algazīr, and Algozīr; also known as Alakrīz) is a village in Sain Qaleh Rural District of the Central District in Abhar County, Zanjan province, Iran.

== Demographics ==
=== Population ===
At the time of the 2006 National Census, the village's population was 2,095 in 413 households. The following census in 2011 counted 2,018 people in 568 households. The 2016 census measured the population of the village as 1,957 people in 579 households.
