= Qaratəpə =

Qaratəpə or Qaratepe (Azeribaijani for "Black Hill") may refer to:

== Azerbaijan ==
- Qaratəpə, Barda, Azerbaijan
- Qaratəpə, Sabirabad, Azerbaijan

== Iran ==
- Qaratepe, Mazandaran, Iran
- Qaratepe, Zanjan, Iran
- Qaratepe, Abhar, Zanjan Province, Iran
- Qaratepe, Qareh Poshtelu, Zanjan County, Zanjan Province, Iran
