= Pir Zagheh =

Village in Zanjan province, Iran

Pir Zagheh Persian: پيرزاغه
- Village
- Location within Iran
- Coordinates: 36°19′54″N 49°00′52″E
- Country: Iran
- Province: Zanjan
- County: Abhar
- District: Central
- Rural District: Sain Qaleh

Population (2016)
  - Total: 1,878
- Time zone: UTC+3:30 (IRST)

Pir Zagheh (Persian: پيرزاغه) (Note: Also romanized as Pīr Zāgheh) is a village in Sain Qaleh Rural District of the Central District in Abhar County, Zanjan province, Iran.

== Demographics ==
=== Population ===
At the time of the 2006 National Census, the village's population was 1,850 in 470 households. The following census in 2011 counted 2,006 people in 562 households. The 2016 census measured the population of the village as 1,878 people in 584 households.
