= Hoseynabad-e Qarqalu =

Village in Zanjan province, Iran

Hoseynabad-e Qarqalu Persian: حسين ابادقارقالو
- Village
- Location within Iran
- Coordinates: 36°18′52″N 49°18′30″E
- Country: Iran
- Province: Zanjan
- County: Abhar
- District: Central
- Rural District: Howmeh

Population (2016)
  - Total: 31
- Time zone: UTC+3:30 (IRST)

Hoseynabad-e Qarqalu (Persian: حسين ابادقارقالو) (Note: Also romanized as Ḩoseynābād-e Qārqālū; also known as Ḩoseynābād, Ḩoseynābād-e Qārqālī, Karkali, and Qārqāli) is a village in Howmeh Rural District of the Central District in Abhar County, Zanjan province, Iran.

== Demographics ==
=== Population ===
At the time of the 2006 National Census, the village's population was 52 in 10 households. The following census in 2011 counted 56 people in 11 households. The 2016 census measured the population of the village as 31 people in seven households.
