= Gol Tappeh, Abhar =

Village in Zanjan province, Iran

Gol Tappeh Persian: گل تپه
- Village
- Location within Iran
- Coordinates: 36°02′16″N 48°59′41″E
- Country: Iran
- Province: Zanjan
- County: Abhar
- District: Central
- Rural District: Dowlatabad

Population (2016)
  - Total: 99
- Time zone: UTC+3:30 (IRST)

Gol Tappeh (Persian: گل تپه) is a village in Dowlatabad Rural District of the Central District in Abhar County, Zanjan province, Iran.

== Demographics ==
=== Population ===
At the time of the 2006 National Census, the village's population was 206 in 43 households. The following census in 2011 counted 157 people in 42 households. The 2016 census measured the population of the village as 99 people in 27 households.
