= Kali, Zanjan =

Village in Zanjan province, Iran

Kali Persian: كلي
- Village
- Location within Iran
- Coordinates: 36°00′49″N 48°55′55″E
- Country: Iran
- Province: Zanjan
- County: Abhar
- District: Central
- Rural District: Dowlatabad

Population (2016)
  - Total: 88
- Time zone: UTC+3:30 (IRST)

Kali (Persian: كلي) (Note: Also romanized as Kalī; also known as Gali, Golī, Gollī, and Kallu) is a village in Dowlatabad Rural District of the Central District in Abhar County, Zanjan province, Iran.

== Demographics ==
=== Population ===
At the time of the 2006 National Census, the village's population was 167 in 29 households. The following census in 2011 counted 89 people in 24 households. The 2016 census measured the population of the village as 88 people in 29 households.
