= Navader Castle =

Castle in Zanjan Province, Iran

Navader castle
- قلعه نوادر

General information
- Type: Castle
- Location: Abhar County, Iran

Navader castle (Persian: قلعه نوادر) is a historical castle located in Abhar County in Zanjan Province, The longevity of this fortress dates back to the Early centuries of historical periods after Islam.
