= Arkin, Iran =

Village in Zanjan province, Iran

Arkin Persian: اركين
- Village
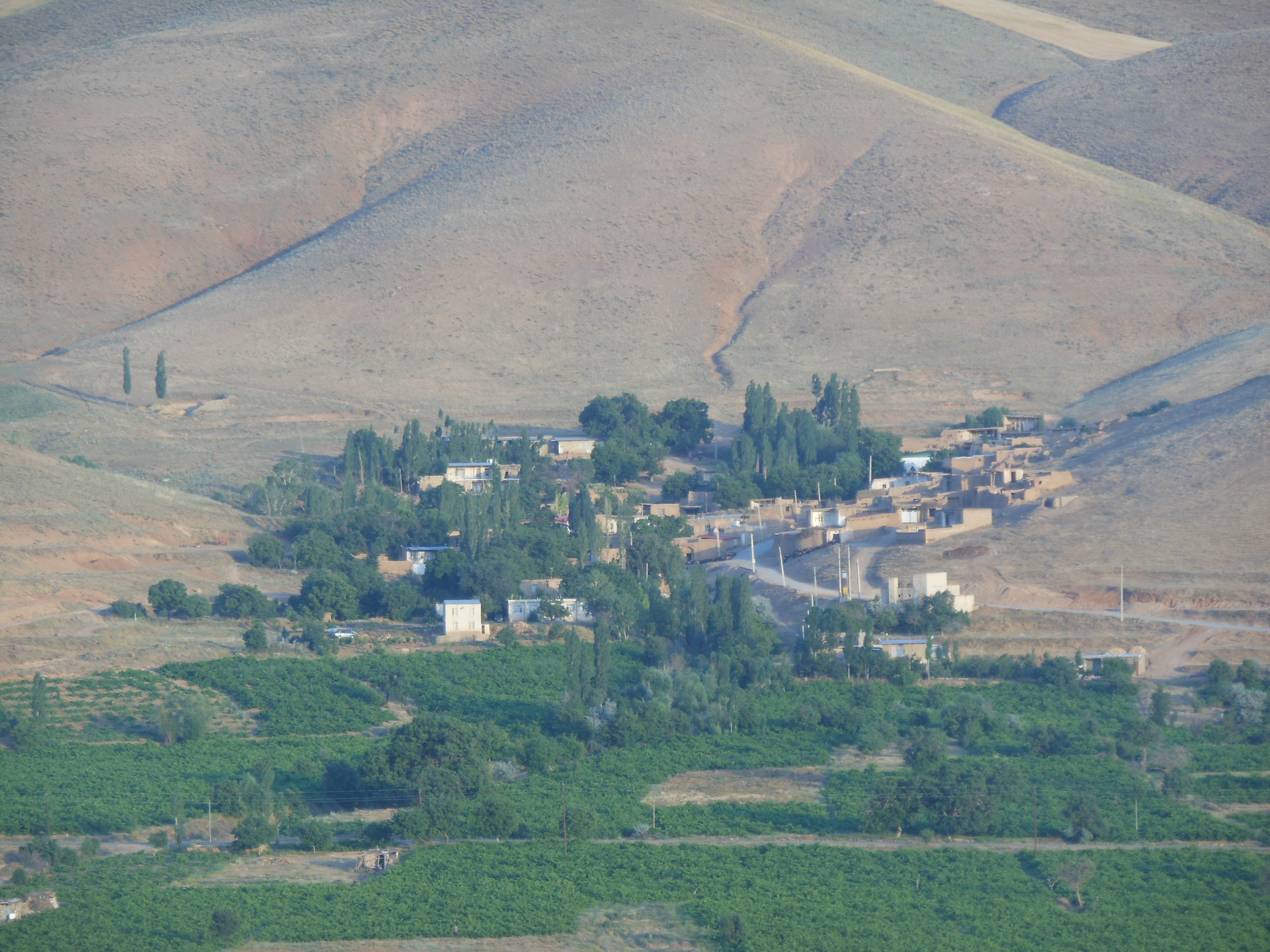
- The village of Arkin

- Location within Iran
- Coordinates: 36°00′05″N 49°11′00″E
- Country: Iran
- Province: Zanjan
- County: Abhar
- District: Central
- Rural District: Darsajin

Population (2016)
  - Total: 91
- Time zone: UTC+3:30 (IRST)

Arkin (Persian: اركين) (Note: Also romanized as Arkīn) is a village in Darsajin Rural District of the Central District in Abhar County, Zanjan province, Iran.

== Demographics ==
=== Population ===
At the time of the 2006 National Census, the village's population was 110 in 29 households. The following census in 2011 counted 91 people in 26 households. The 2016 census measured the population of the village as 91 people in 30 households.
