= Khorasanlu, Zanjan =

Village in Zanjan province, Iran

Khorasanlu Persian: خراسانلو
- Village
- Location within Iran
- Coordinates: 36°21′59″N 49°05′36″E
- Country: Iran
- Province: Zanjan
- County: Abhar
- District: Central
- Rural District: Sain Qaleh

Population (2016)
  - Total: 396
- Time zone: UTC+3:30 (IRST)

Khorasanlu (Persian: خراسانلو) (Note: Also romanized as Khorāsānlū; also known as Khurasanlu) is a village in Sain Qaleh Rural District of the Central District in Abhar County, Zanjan province, Iran.

== Demographics ==
=== Population ===
At the time of the 2006 National Census, the village's population was 492 in 139 households. The following census in 2011 counted 455 people in 138 households. The 2016 census measured the population of the village as 396 people in 126 households.
