= Kabud Cheshmeh =

Village in Zanjan province, Iran

Kabud Cheshmeh Persian: كبودچشمه
- Village
- Location within Iran
- Coordinates: 36°15′14″N 49°01′59″E
- Country: Iran
- Province: Zanjan
- County: Abhar
- District: Central
- Rural District: Sain Qaleh

Population (2016)
  - Total: 859
- Time zone: UTC+3:30 (IRST)

Kabud Cheshmeh (Persian: كبودچشمه) (Note: Also romanized as Kabūd Chashmeh and Kabūd Cheshmeh; also known as Khalifali, Khalif‘alu, Khalīfeh ‘Alī, and Khalīfehlū) is a village in Sain Qaleh Rural District of the Central District in Abhar County, Zanjan province, Iran.

== Demographics ==
=== Population ===
At the time of the 2006 National Census, the village's population was 1,015 in 243 households. The following census in 2011 counted 977 people in 275 households. The 2016 census measured the population of the village as 859 people in 260 households.
