= Qorveh (disambiguation) =

Qorveh is a city in Kurdistan Province, Iran.

Qorveh or Qerveh (Persian: قروه) may also refer to:

- Qorveh-e Darjazin, Hamadan Province
- Qorveh, Kermanshah
- Qerveh, Zanjan
- Qorveh County, in Kurdistan Province
