= Nayjuk =

Village in Zanjan province, Iran

Nayjuk Persian: نايجوك
- Village
- Location within Iran
- Coordinates: 35°57′10″N 48°58′00″E
- Country: Iran
- Province: Zanjan
- County: Abhar
- District: Central
- Rural District: Dowlatabad

Population (2016)
  - Total: 258
- Time zone: UTC+3:30 (IRST)

Nayjuk (Persian: نايجوك) (Note: Also romanized as Nayjook and Nāyjūk; also known as Nahīn and Nājiūk) is a village in Dowlatabad Rural District of the Central District in Abhar County, Zanjan province, Iran.

== Demographics ==
=== Population ===
At the time of the 2006 National Census, the village's population was 333 in 89 households. The following census in 2011 counted 262 people in 72 households. The 2016 census measured the population of the village as 258 people in 79 households.
