= Khalifehlu =

Khalifehlu (Persian: خليفه لو) may refer to various places in Iran:

- Khalifehlu, Meshgin Shahr, Ardabil Province
- Khalifehlu, Namin, Ardabil Province
- Khalifehlu, Ahar, East Azerbaijan Province
- Khalifehlu, Meyaneh, East Azerbaijan Province
- Khalifehlu, West Azerbaijan
- Khalifehlu, Abhar, Zanjan Province
- Khalifehlu, Khodabandeh, Zanjan Province
- Khalifehlu, Khorramdarreh, Zanjan Province
