= Qizlar Qaleh Si Castle =

Castle in Zanjan Province, Iran

Qizlar Qaleh Si castle
- قلعه قیزلارقلعه‌سی

General information
- Type: Castle
- Location: Abhar County, Iran

Qizlar Qaleh Si castle (Persian: قلعه قیزلارقلعه‌سی) is a historical castle located in Abhar County in Zanjan Province, The longevity of this fortress dates back to the Ilkhanate.
