= Jameh Mosque of Qerveh =

Mosque in Qerveh, Zanjan province, Iran

Jāmeh Mosque of Qerveh
- مسجد جامع قروه
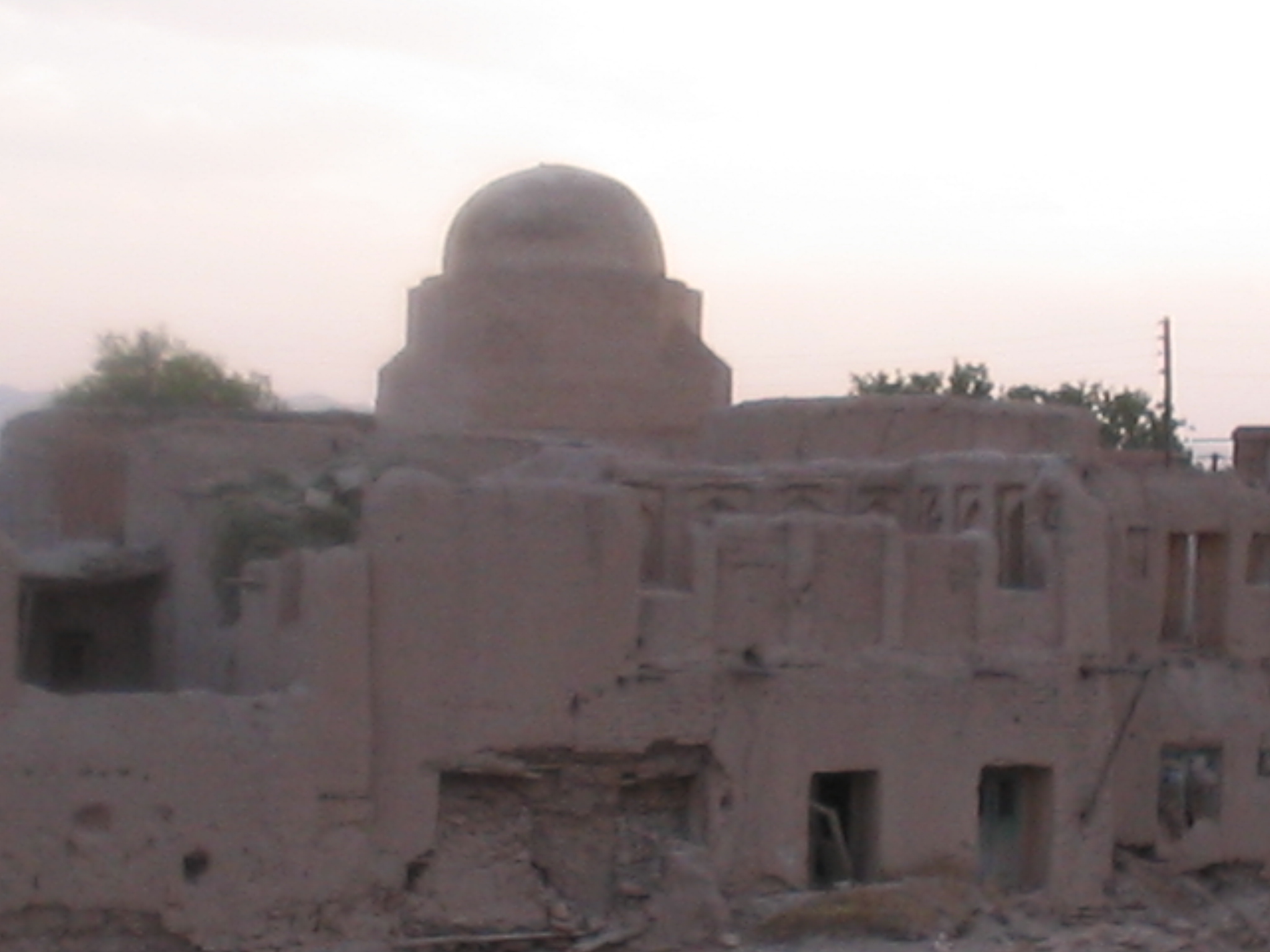
- The mosque in [YYYY]

- Location of the mosque in Iran

Religion
- Affiliation: Shia Islam
- Ecclesiastical or organisational status: Friday mosque
- Status: Active

Location
- Location: Qerveh, Abhar County, Zanjan Province
- Country: Iran
- Coordinates: 36°03′32″N 49°22′42″E

Architecture
- Type: Mosque architecture
- Style: Seljuk
- Completed: 5th century AH (11th century CE)

Specifications
- Dome: Four
- Materials: Bricks

Iran National Heritage List
- Official name: Jāmeh Mosque of Qerveh
- Type: Built
- Designated: 24 February 1963
- Reference no.: 433
- Conservation organization: Cultural Heritage, Handicrafts and Tourism Organization of Iran

The Jāmeh Mosque of Qerveh (Persian: مسجد جامع قروه; Arabic: جامع قروة), also known as the Qerveh Spacious Mosque, is a Shi'ite Friday mosque (jāmeh) located in Qerveh, (Note: Also romanized as Qorveh; also known as Farvah, Ghorveh, Quenveh, and Qurveh; hence Gherveh Grand Mosque, etc.) in Abhar County, in the province of Zanjan, Iran. The mosque was completed in the 5th century AH (11th century CE), during the Seljuk era.

The mosque was added to the Iran National Heritage List on 24 February 1963, administered by the Cultural Heritage, Handicrafts and Tourism Organization of Iran.

The Jāmeh Mosque of Qerveh is one of the historical monuments in the Abrrud (Great River) region. Located in the heart of the old part of the village, the mosque was built in the four-dome style and has a beautiful dome resting on four piers. The mosque is a valuable work comparable to the porches of the Jāmeh mosques of Qazvin and Kabul.

== See also ==
- Shia Islam in Iran
- List of mosques in Iran
