= Howmeh Rural District (Abhar County) =

Rural district in Zanjan province, Iran

Howmeh Rural District Persian: دهستان حومه
- Rural District
- Location within Iran
- Coordinates: 36°12′N 49°18′E
- Country: Iran
- Province: Zanjan
- County: Abhar
- District: Central
- Established: 1987
- Capital: Nurin

Population (2016)
  - Total: 6,045
- Time zone: UTC+3:30 (IRST)

Howmeh Rural District (Persian: دهستان حومه) is in the Central District of Abhar County, Zanjan province, Iran. Its capital is the village of Nurin. The previous capital of the rural district was the village of Sharifabad, now a neighborhood in the city of Abhar.

== Demographics ==
=== Population ===
At the time of the 2006 National Census, the rural district's population was 12,543 in 3,259 households. There were 6,448 inhabitants in 1,890 households at the following census of 2011. The 2016 census measured the population of the rural district as 6,045 in 1,982 households. The most populous of its 33 villages was Qerveh, with 2,686 people.

=== Other villages in the rural district ===
- Aliabad
- Amirabad
- Asadabad
- Bahavar
- Barzabil
- Davudgar
- Gollejeh
- Hesar-e Abd ol Karim
- Hesar-e Qajar
- Hoseynabad-e Qarqalu
- Kalleh Khaneh
- Komajin
- Qamchabad
- Qarah Tappeh
- Qarluq
- Qeshlaq-e Marshun
- Queyujuq
- Yeylaq Marshun
