= Qarah Tappeh, Abhar =

Village in Zanjan province, Iran

Qarah Tappeh Persian: قره‌تپه
- Village
- Location within Iran
- Coordinates: 36°09′10″N 49°22′38″E
- Country: Iran
- Province: Zanjan
- County: Abhar
- District: Central
- Rural District: Howmeh

Population (2016)
  - Total: 32
- Time zone: UTC+3:30 (IRST)

Qarah Tappeh (Persian: قره‌تپه) (Note: Also romanized as Qareh Tappeh; also known as Kara-Tappeg and Qaratepe) is a village in Howmeh Rural District of the Central District in Abhar County, Zanjan province, Iran.

== Demographics ==
=== Population ===
At the time of the 2006 National Census, the village's population was 23 in seven households. The village did not appear in the following census of 2011. The 2016 census measured the population of the village as 32 people in nine households.
