= Hoz Leh Castle =

Castle in Zanjan Province, Iran

Hoz Leh castle
- قلعه حوض له

General information
- Type: Castle
- Location: Abhar County, Iran

Hoz Leh castle (Persian: قلعه حوض له) is a historical castle located in Abhar County in Zanjan Province, Iran. The longevity of this fortress dates back to the Historical periods after Islam.
