= Kuh Zin =

Village in Zanjan province, Iran

Kuh Zin Persian: كوه زين
- Village
- Location within Iran
- Coordinates: 36°23′06″N 49°04′32″E
- Country: Iran
- Province: Zanjan
- County: Abhar
- District: Central
- Rural District: Sain Qaleh

Population (2016)
  - Total: 453
- Time zone: UTC+3:30 (IRST)

Kuh Zin (Persian: كوه زين) (Note: Also romanized as Kūh Zīn; also known as Gazīn, Gozīn, Kezan, and Kizin) is a village in Sain Qaleh Rural District of the Central District in Abhar County, Zanjan province, Iran.

== Demographics ==
=== Population ===
At the time of the 2006 National Census, the village's population was 402 in 99 households. The following census in 2011 counted 384 people in 117 households. The 2016 census measured the population of the village as 453 people in 138 households.
