= Tudeh Bin =

Village in Zanjan province, Iran

Tudeh Bin Persian: توده بين
- Village
- Location within Iran
- Coordinates: 35°59′34″N 49°18′10″E
- Country: Iran
- Province: Zanjan
- County: Abhar
- District: Central
- Rural District: Darsajin

Population (2016)
  - Total: 126
- Time zone: UTC+3:30 (IRST)

Tudeh Bin (Persian: توده بين) (Note: Also romanized as Toodeh Bin and Tūdeh Bīn; also known as Ārpāshāl and Tūdabīn) is a village in Darsajin Rural District of the Central District in Abhar County, Zanjan province, Iran.

== Demographics ==
=== Population ===
At the time of the 2006 National Census, the village's population was 335 in 94 households. The following census in 2011 counted 158 people in 63 households. The 2016 census measured the population of the village as 126 people in 58 households.
