= Nahin =

Nahin may refer to:

- Nahīn, alternate name for Nayjuk, a village in Iran
- Paul J. Nahin (born 1940), American electrical engineer, author, and professor
- Nahin Abhi Nahin, a 1980 Pakistani romantic Urdu film
