= Gazin =

Gazin may refer to:

- Château Gazin, a wine appellation
- Gazin, Iran (disambiguation), places in Iran
- Charles Lewis Gazin, a zoologist
