= Tudeh (disambiguation) =

Tudeh (Persian: توده) or its variants may refer to:

== Places ==
- Tudeh, North Khorasan, a village in Shirvan County, North Khorasan province
- Tudeh, Nir, a village in Nir District, Taft County
- Tudeh Bin, a village in Abhar County, Zanjan province

== Other ==
- Tudeh fraction, Iranian parliamentary group
- Tudeh Military Network, former Iranian intelligence-gathering network
- Tudeh Party of Iran, an Iranian communist party
- Tudeh Youth Organization, young wing of the Tudeh Party of Iran
