= Gazin, Iran =

Gazin (Persian: گزين or گزئين) in Iran may refer to:

- Gazin, Sistan and Baluchestan (گزين - Gazīn)
- Gazin, Zanjan (گزين - Gazīn)
- Gazin Rural District (گزين - Gazīn), in Khuzestan Province
