= Khorasanlu =

Khorasanlu (Persian: خراسانلو) may refer to:

- Khorasanlu, East Azerbaijan
- Khorasanlu, Zanjan
