= Qerveh, Zanjan =

Village in Zanjan province, Iran

Qerveh Persian: قروه
- Village
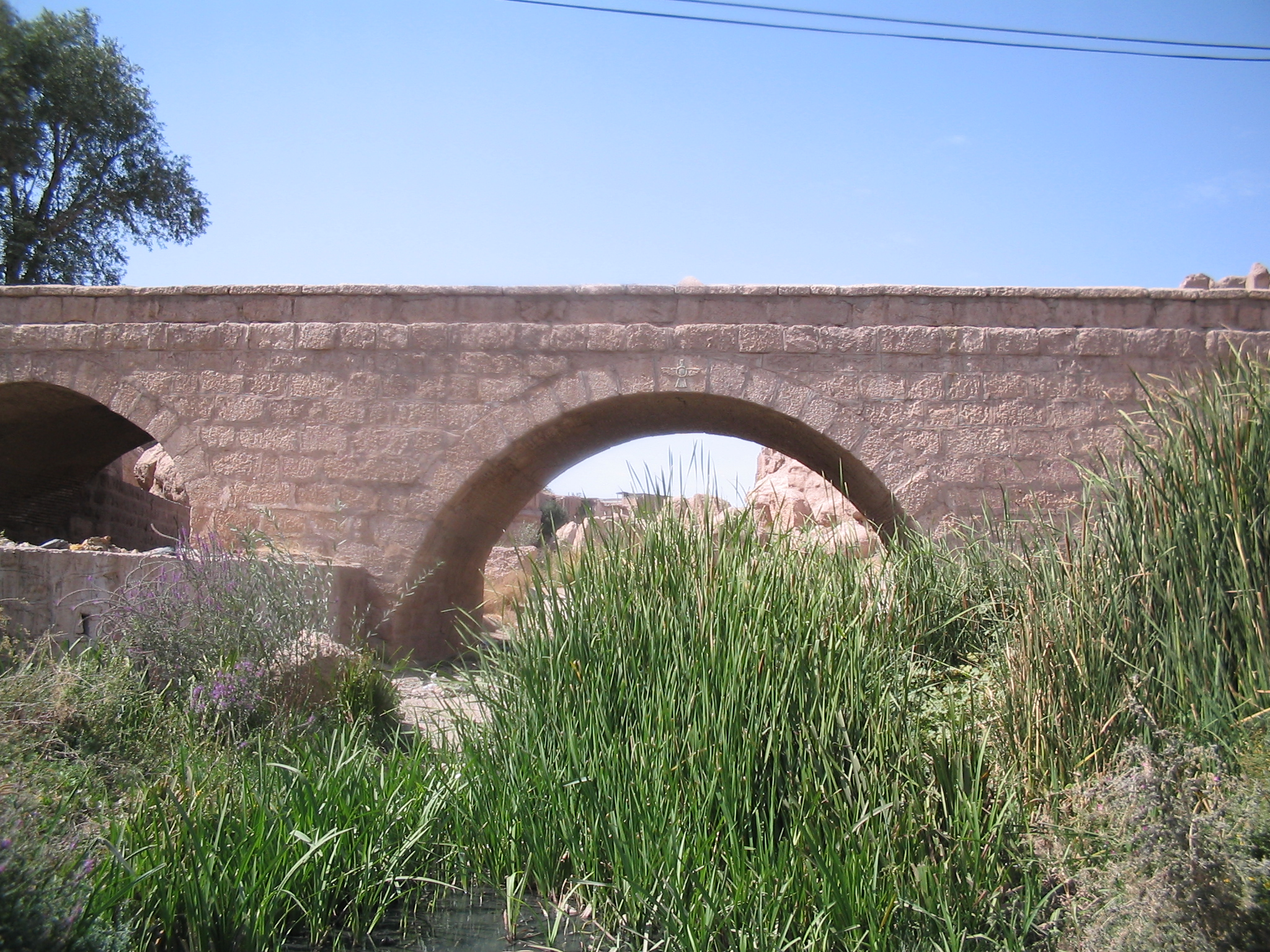
- The Old Qerveh Bridge

- Location within Iran
- Coordinates: 36°03′40″N 49°23′06″E
- Country: Iran
- Province: Zanjan
- County: Abhar
- District: Central
- Rural District: Howmeh

Population (2016)
  - Total: 2,686
- Time zone: UTC+3:30 (IRST)
- Area code: 0242536

Qerveh (Persian: قروه) (Note: Also romanized as Qorveh; also known as Farvah, Ghorveh, Quenveh, and Qurveh) is a village in Howmeh Rural District of the Central District in Abhar County, Zanjan province, Iran.

== Demographics ==
=== Population ===
At the time of the 2006 National Census, the village's population was 2,772 in 720 households. The following census in 2011 counted 2,640 people in 781 households. The 2016 census measured the population of the village as 2,686 people in 871 households. It was the most populous village in its rural district.

== Overview ==
Qerveh is one of the oldest villages in Abhar County. The area has more than three thousand years of known history, with specific markers being an ancient house built on a cliff, the Imam Zadeh abol kheirebne mosabne jafar (امامزاده ابوالخیر بن موسی بن جعفر) and the old Sadat cemetery which houses two young martyrs, Seyed Abdol Karim ebne Saeed (سید عبد الکریم ین سعید) and Hossein ebne Rostam (حسین بن رستم). It is home to the Gherveh Spacious Mosque and an entrance bridge with the Ahura Mazda logo on it.

== Economy ==
The main source of income for villagers is through agriculture, farming and horticulture. Agricultural products include grapes, walnuts, almonds and tomatoes.
