= Molla Hassan Kashi Mausoleum =

16th century mausoleum in Soltaniyeh, Iran

Molla Hassan Kāshi Mausoleum
- آرامگاه ملاحسن كاشي
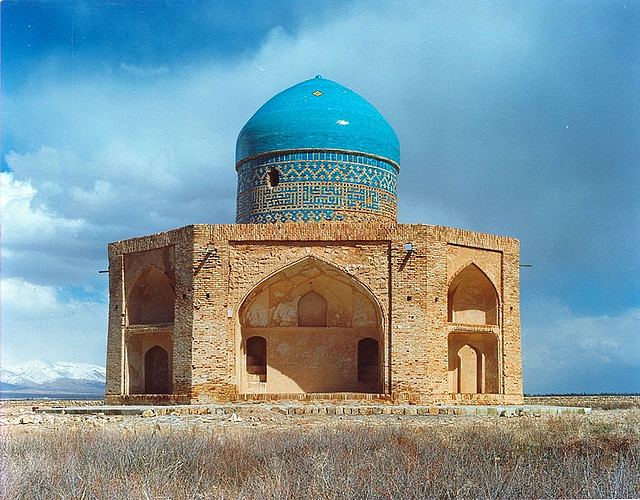
- The mausoleum in 2008

- Location of the mausoleum in Iran

Religion
- Affiliation: Shia Islam
- Ecclesiastical or organisational status: Mausoleum
- Status: Active

Location
- Location: Abhar, Zanjan province
- Country: Iran
- Interactive map of Molla Hassan Kāshi Mausoleum
- Coordinates: 36°25′04″N 48°47′41″E

Architecture
- Type: Islamic architecture
- Style: Safavid
- Completed: 1566 CE
- Materials: Bricks; mortar

Iran National Heritage List
- Official name: Mausoleum of Molla Hassan Kashi
- Type: Mausoleum
- Designated: 1932
- Reference no.: 168
- Conservation organization: Cultural Heritage, Handicrafts and Tourism Organization of Iran

The Molla Hassan Kāshi Mausoleum (Persian: آرامگاه ملاحسن كاشي) is a Shi'ite mausoleum, located in Abhar, in the province of Zanjan, Iran. Completed in 1566 CE, during the reign of Shah Tahmasp I, the structure is the resting place of Molla Hassan Kāshi, a 14th-century mystic whose recasting of Islam's historical sagas as Persian poetic epics unwittingly had a vast influence over Shia Islam's future direction.

The mausoleum was added to the Iran National Heritage List on 6 January 1932 and is administered by the Cultural Heritage, Handicrafts and Tourism Organization of Iran.

== Overview ==
The free-standing isolated monument is situated approximately 2.5 kilometres (1.6 mi) south of Soltaniyeh. It is composed of a small esplanade serving as an entrance, and the mausoleum itself. The mausoleum displays an octagonal plan from the exterior though it is, in reality, a 6-by-6-metre (20 ft × 20 ft) square hall with additional galleries at the corners giving the aspect of an octagon. The mausoleum's octagonal exterior is uniquely shaped with four sides measuring 80.3 metres (263 ft) long, and the other four sides measuring 5.75 metres (18.9 ft) long.

In each gallery, there is a narrow staircase leading to an upper storey. The square building is roofed with a double-shelled dome, which has another layer of blue glazed bricks consisting of repeating geometric designs, as well as repeating Kufic calligraphy. The interior decoration of stucco stalactites was done at the time of Fath-Ali Shah, a Qajar king, in the early 19th century.

== See also ==
- List of mausoleums in Iran
- Persian domes
- Shia Islam in Iran
