= Dowlatabad Rural District (Abhar County) =

Rural district in Zanjan province, Iran

Dowlatabad Rural District Persian: دهستان دولت آباد
- Rural District
- Location within Iran
- Coordinates: 35°59′N 49°02′E
- Country: Iran
- Province: Zanjan
- County: Abhar
- District: Central
- Established: 1987
- Capital: Dowlatabad

Population (2016)
  - Total: 2,605
- Time zone: UTC+3:30 (IRST)

Dowlatabad Rural District (Persian: دهستان دولت آباد) is in the Central District of Abhar County, Zanjan province, Iran. Its capital is the village of Dowlatabad.

== Demographics ==
=== Population ===
At the time of the 2006 National Census, the rural district's population was 4,228 in 937 households. There were 3,225 inhabitants in 898 households at the following census of 2011. The 2016 census measured the population of the rural district as 2,605 in 739 households. The most populous of its 16 villages was Chang Almas, with 426 people.

=== Other villages in the rural district ===
- Aghur
- Amir Bostaq
- Chashin
- Cheshmeh Bar
- Eyvanak
- Gol Tappeh
- Kali
- Khvoshnam
- Nayjuk
- Shekar Cheshmeh
- Yengi Kand
