= Darsajin Rural District =

Rural district in Zanjan province, Iran

Darsajin Rural District Persian: دهستان درسجين
- Rural District
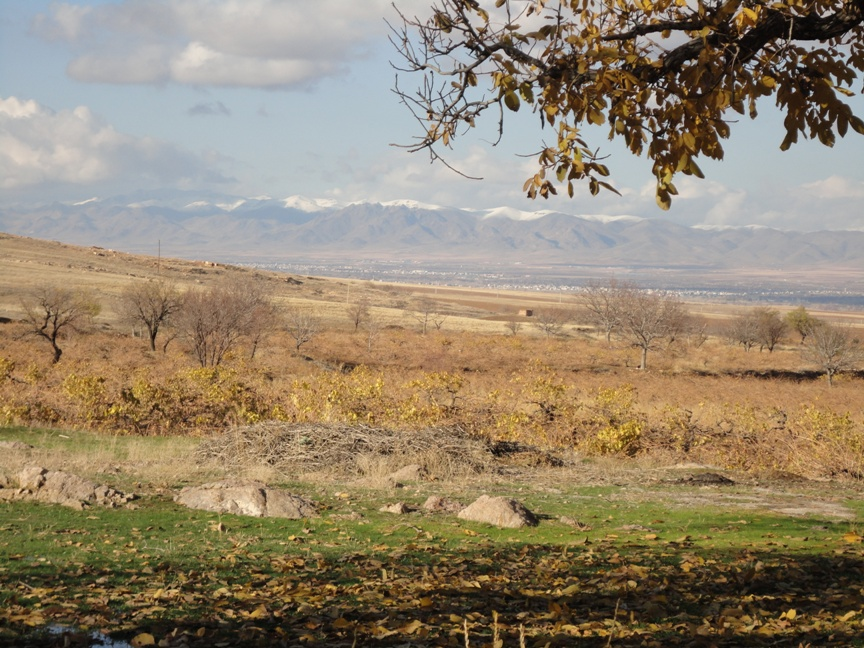

- Location within Iran
- Coordinates: 36°03′N 49°13′E
- Country: Iran
- Province: Zanjan
- County: Abhar
- District: Central
- Established: 1987
- Capital: Darsajin

Population (2016)
  - Total: 1,197
- Time zone: UTC+3:30 (IRST)

Darsajin Rural District (Persian: دهستان درسجين) is in the Central District of Abhar County, Zanjan province, Iran. Its capital is the village of Darsajin.

== Demographics ==
=== Language ===
The language of the people is Persian, which is also known as the Lori dialect.

=== Population ===
At the time of the 2006 National Census, the rural district's population was 2,099 in 611 households. There were 1,796 inhabitants in 558 households at the following census of 2011. The 2016 census measured the population of the rural district as 1,197 in 455 households. The most populous of its 19 villages was Darsajin, with 320 people.

=== Other villages in the rural district ===
- Aqcheh Kand
- Arkin
- Aznab
- Kalangarz
- Khalifeh Hesar
- Quhajin
- Razmejin
- Shivarin
- Tudeh Bin
