= Sain Qaleh Rural District =

Rural district in Zanjan province, Iran

Sain Qaleh Rural District Persian: دهستان صائين قلعه
- Rural District
- Location within Iran
- Coordinates: 36°22′N 49°01′E
- Country: Iran
- Province: Zanjan
- County: Abhar
- District: Central
- Established: 1987
- Capital: Amidabad

Population (2016)
  - Total: 10,833
- Time zone: UTC+3:30 (IRST)

Sain Qaleh Rural District (Persian: دهستان صائين قلعه) is in the Central District of Abhar County, Zanjan province, Iran. Its capital is the village of Amidabad.

== Demographics ==
=== Population ===
At the time of the 2006 National Census, the rural district's population was 12,005 in 2,901 households. There were 11,645 inhabitants in 3,440 households at the following census of 2011. The 2016 census measured the population of the rural district as 10,833 in 3,372 households. The most populous of its 17 villages was Amidabad, with 2,147 people.

=== Other villages in the rural district ===
- Algazir
- Arhan
- Chargar
- Dash Bolagh
- Gav Darreh
- Jodaqiyeh
- Kabud Cheshmeh
- Khorasanlu
- Kuh Zin
- Pir Zagheh
- Sarv-e Jahan
