= Hidaj =

City in Zanjan province, Iran

Hidaj Persian: هیدج
- City
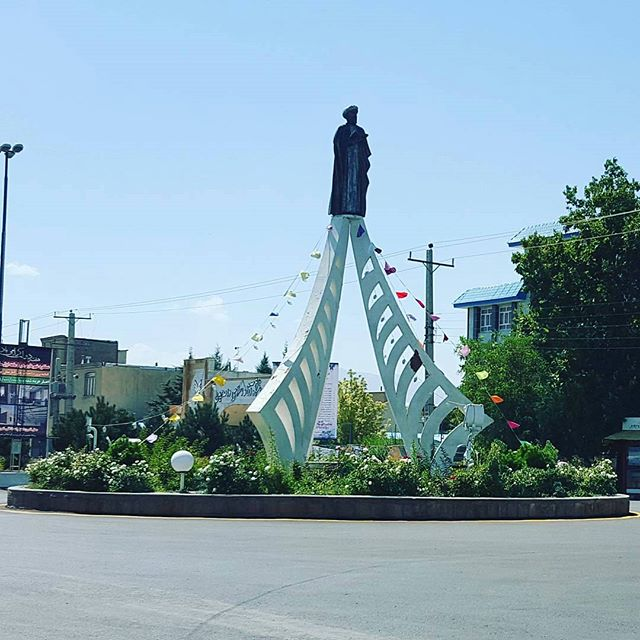
- Hakim Hidaji Square in the city of Hidaj

- Location within Iran
- Coordinates: 36°15′21″N 49°07′53″E
- Country: Iran
- Province: Zanjan
- County: Abhar
- District: Central

Government
  - Mayor: Mohammad Najafi

Population (2016)
  - Total: 13,840
- Time zone: UTC+3:30 (IRST)

Hidaj (Persian: هیدج) (Note: Also known as Haiyeh, Hayā (هَيا), and Khiya (خیا)) is a city in the Central District of Abhar County, Zanjan province, Iran.

== Demographics ==
=== Population ===
At the time of the 2006 National Census, the city's population was 11,798 in 3,011 households. The following census in 2011 counted 13,003 people in 3,764 households. The 2016 census measured the population of the city as 13,840 people in 4,309 households.
