= Qaratəpə, Barda =

Village and municipality in Barda Rayon, Azerbaijan

Qaratəpə is a village and municipality in the Barda Rayon of Azerbaijan. It has a population of 551.
