= Shy Arkin =

Professor of biochemistry at the Hebrew University

- שי ארקין
- Born: Isaiah T. (Shy) Arkin; 1965 (age 60–61); Tel Aviv, Israel
- Education: Hebrew University of Jerusalem, BS; Tel Aviv University, BS; Yale University School of Medicine, PhD
- Employer(s): The Hebrew University of Jerusalem Institute of Life Sciences, Department of Biological Chemistry
- Title: Arthur Lejwa Professor of Structural Biochemistry

Isaiah T. (Shy) Arkin (Hebrew: שי ארקין; born 1965) is the Israeli Arthur Lejwa Professor of Structural Biochemistry at The Hebrew University of Jerusalem Institute of Life Sciences, Department of Biological Chemistry in Jerusalem, Israel.

== Biography ==
Arkin was born in Tel Aviv, Israel. He earned bachelor's degree at the Robert H. Smith Faculty of Agriculture, Food and Environment at The Hebrew University of Jerusalem in Israel, and at the Faculty of Life Sciences at Tel Aviv University. Arkin received a doctorate in Cell Biology from Yale University School of Medicine in 1996.

From 1997 to 2000, he was a Lecturer in the Department of Biochemistry at Cambridge University.

Arkin is the Arthur Lejwa Professor of Structural Biochemistry at The Hebrew University of Jerusalem Institute of Life Sciences, Department of Biological Chemistry in Jerusalem, Israel. He joined the faculty of The Hebrew University of Jerusalem as a senior lecturer in biochemistry. In 2001, he was named an associate professor. In 2007, he was named a professor. In 2008, he was appointed Chair of the Alexander Silberman Institute of Life Sciences. In 2009 he was appointed Head of the Authority for Research and Development at the Hebrew University of Jerusalem.

His research focuses on the structural analyses of transmembrane proteins (mostly from viral origin), and research into viruses (including coronavirus) and antivirals.
