= Abhar =

City in Zanjan province, Iran

Abhar ابهر
- City
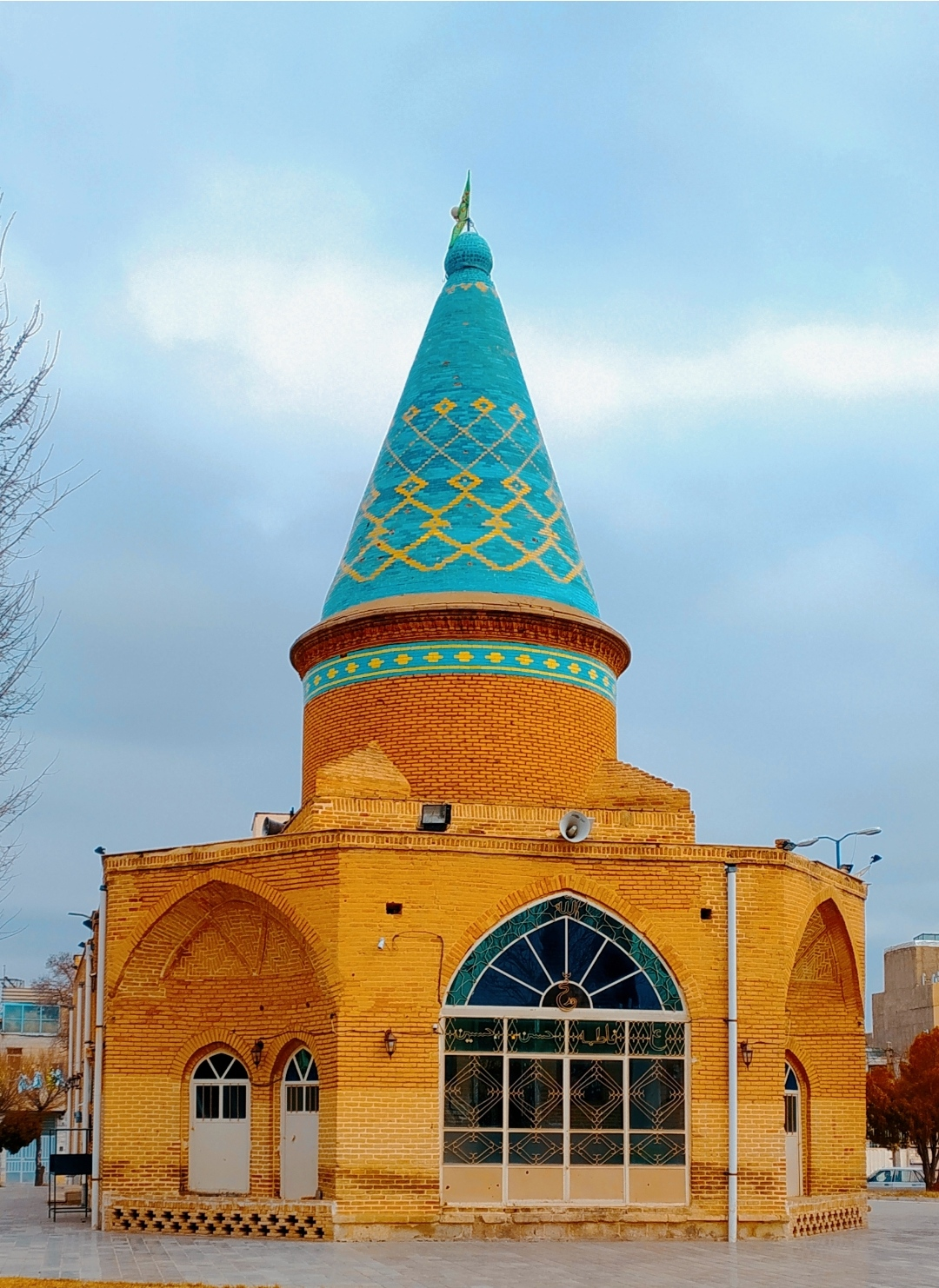
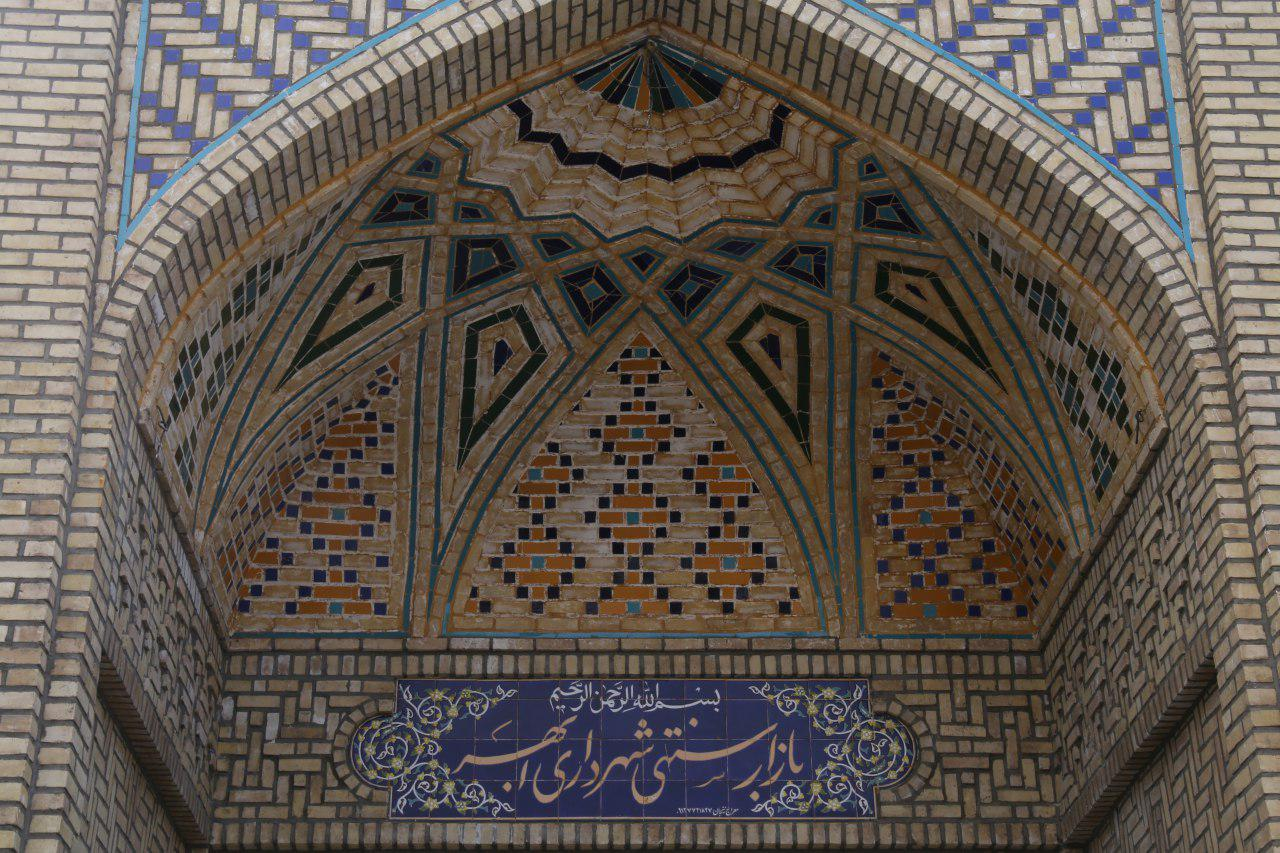
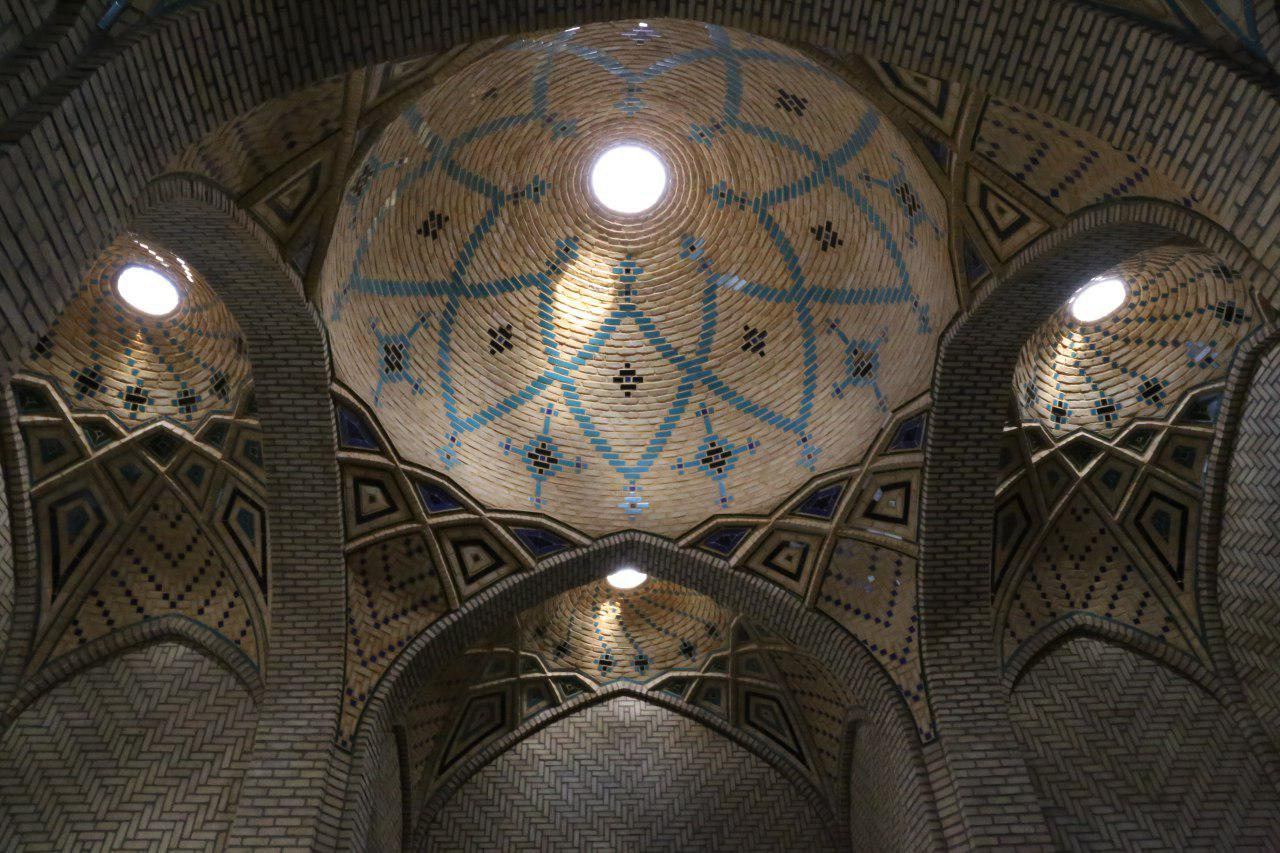
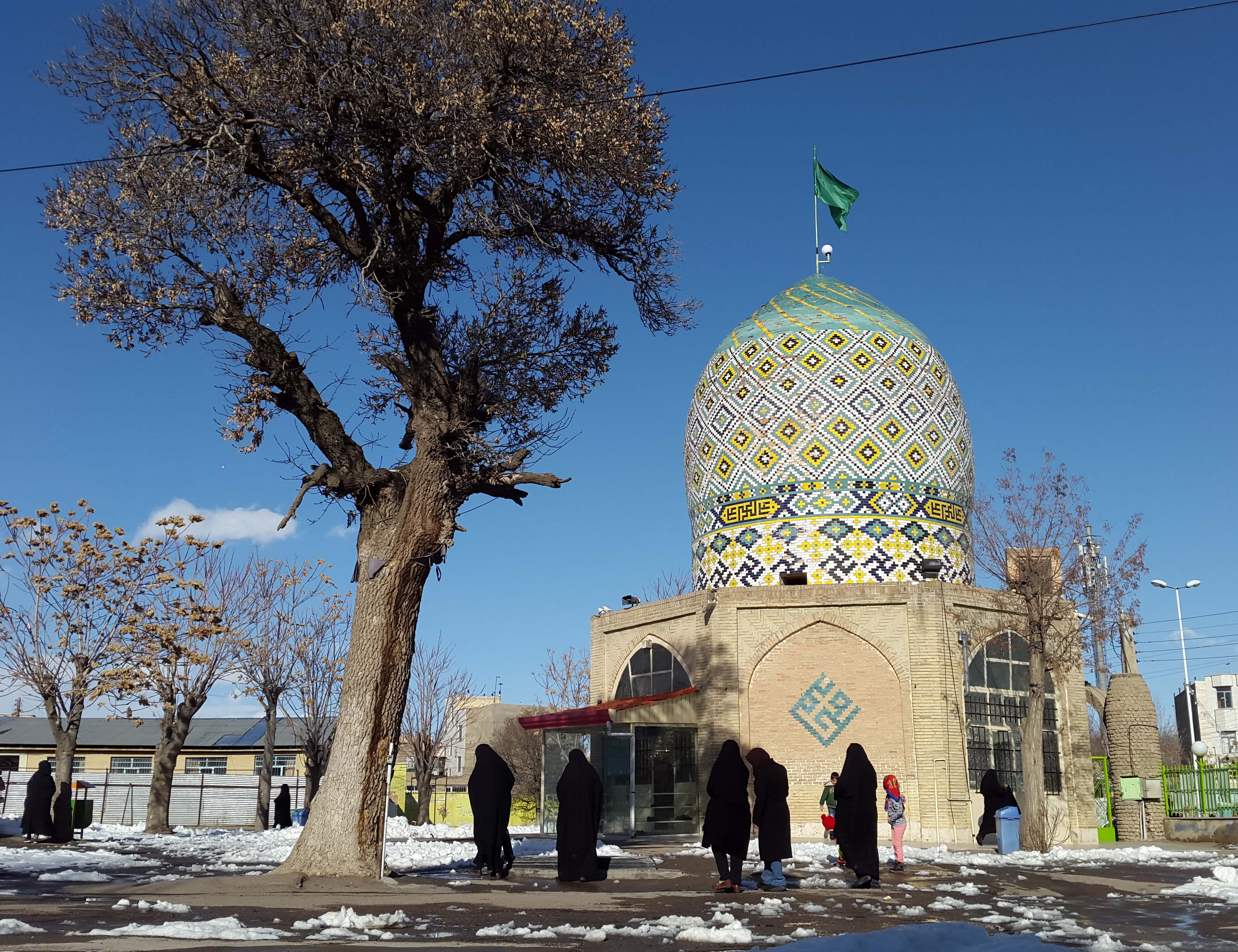

- Location within Iran
- Coordinates: 36°08′47″N 49°13′21″E
- Country: Iran
- Province: Zanjan
- County: Abhar
- District: Central

Population (2016)
  - Total: 99,285
- Time zone: UTC+3:30 (IRST)

Abhar (Persian: ابهر) (Note: Also known as Abkhar and Awhar) is a city in the Central District of Abhar County, Zanjan province, Iran, serving as capital of both the county and the district. Abhar has historically served as a place of importance due to lying right between the cities of Qazvin and Zanjan.

== Etymology ==
"Abhar" is a combination of the words āb (water) and har (mill), due to the various water mills in the area. The locals refer to it as "Awhar". In the 10th-century geography book Hudud al-'Alam, the name is also spelt as "Awhar". Yaqut al-Hamawi (died 1229) likewise reports that the Persians called the city "Awhar".

== History ==
Abhar has served as a vital spot since antiquity due to its location on the route that links Dinavar to Qazvin and Zanjan as well as the central areas of Iran to the region of Azerbaijan. It was conquered in 643 or 645 by al-Bara' ibn Azib during the Arab conquest of Iran. The inhabitants of Abhar initially put up a fierce fight which lasted for several days, but eventually sued for peace, which the Arabs agreed to.

Abhar was part of the Jibal region, which would later in the 11th-12th centuries become known as Persian Iraq. Ibn Hawqal, writing in the 10th-century, reports that the inhabitants of Abhar were Kurds. The Samanid ruler Ismail Samani (r. 892–907) captured Abhar during his rule. In 916 or 917, Abhar (along with Zanjan, Qazvin, and Ray) was seized from the Samanids by the Sajid Yusuf ibn Abi'l-Saj (r. 901–928), the virtually independent governor of the caliphal provinces of Azerbaijan and Armenia. Yusuf attempted to justify his attack by claiming that the previous caliphal vizier Ali ibn Isa ibn al-Jarrah had given him the governorship of the region. Most authors, however, consider this claim to be made up. In 917, Wasif al-Baktimuri was given the governorship of Abhar and other areas by the caliph al-Muqtadir (r. 908–929).

In 928, Abhar was briefly seized by the Alid ruler of northern Iran, Abu Muhammad Hasan ibn Qasim. He was soon ousted from the town by Asfar ibn Shiruya, who claimed the place for himself. In 930, Asfar was betrayed and ambushed by his Ziyarid commander Mardavij, who took over his domains, including Abhar. In 942, the Samanid general Abu Ali Chaghani captured Abhar. In 997, the ruler of the Daylamite Sallarid dynasty, Ibrahim II ibn Marzuban II, capitalized on the weak rule of the Buyid ruler Majd al-Dawla (r. 997–1029) by briefly seizing Buyid land in Jibal, including Abhar, Zanjan and Sohrevard. A coin that was struck in 1013/14 has been found in Abhar, either made under the Sallarids or their opponents, the Rawadid dynasty. In 1029, Abhar was conquered by a Ghaznavid force led by prince Mas'ud.

In 1091, the Nizari Ismailis seized Sanamkuh, a fortress located in the environs of Abhar. They controlled until 1096, when they were repelled by the sultan of the Seljuk Empire, Berkyaruq (r. 1094–1105). In 1167, Abhar was attacked by a force led by Inanaj, a commander of the Eldiguzid dynasty of Azerbaijan. Supported by soldiers sent by the Khwarazmshah Ala al-Din Tekish (r. 1172–1200) of the Anushtegin dynasty, Inanaj ran rampant in the town, capturing the women and children before going back to Khwarazm. In 1217, the Khwarazmshah Muhammad II (r. 1200–1220) conquered Abhar.

Abhar is described in some detail by Hamdallah Mustawfi, who in the 14th-century served as governor of the town along with some other places. He estimated that the length of the ramparts was 5,500 gams (paces/strides). He commended the produce of the town, which encompassed of grain and large amount of fruits, especially the Sijistani pears, Bu Ali plums and black cherries. He also reported that the residents of Abhar had fair skin and were adherents of the Shafi'i school, and that the grave of Shaykh Abu Bakr ibn Tahir al-Tayyar al-Abhari was located there.

The 17th-century French traveler Jean-Baptiste Tavernier, who had been to Abhar, reported the place in his 1676 book Les six voyages en Turquie, en Perse et aux Indes as a sizable, ancient town that was now in ruins and home to a community of Armenians. Another French traveler, Jean Chardin, who had been to Abhar in 1673, reported that the place had seen several massacres and devastations. He added that the town had large gardens despite having little more than 2,500 houses. He described its inhabitants as Persian-speaking, contrary to its previous populace, which spoke Turkic.

Comte Laurent de Sercey, writing in 1840, reported that Abhar had 800–900 inhabitants and 200 houses. Zayn al-Abidin Shirvani (died 1837), however, reported that Abhar had 700 houses. During the rule of the Qajar shah of Iran, Naser al-Din Shah Qajar (r. 1848–1896), the royal artillery used Abhar as one of their central bases.

== Demographics ==
=== Language ===
The population of Abhar consists of Turkic speakers who are generally bilingual in Persian.

=== Population ===
At the time of the 2006 National Census, the city's population was 70,836 in 19,136 households. The following census in 2011 counted 87,396 people in 25,646 households. The 2016 census measured the population of the city as 99,285 people in 30,932 households.

== Archaeology ==
The Abhar-rud valley has remains and artifacts that date back to the 2nd millennium BC. Abhar's ancient origins are further demonstrated by the fact that it is linked by Islamic-era writers to mythological and semi-mythical individuals in Kayanian era. In his Tarikh-i guzida, Hamdallah Mustawfi (died after 1339/40) reports that the founder of Abhar was the Kayanian ruler, Dara II, whose historical counterpart is the Achaemenid ruler Darius III (r. 336–330 BC). However, in his Nuzhat al-Qulub, Hamdallah Mustawfi credits Kay Khosrow with the city's foundation. Yaqut al-Hamawi attributes the foundation of Abhar and its fortress to the Sasanian ruler Shapur II (r. 309–379). Another fortress appears to have been erected or added on top of this old fortress at a later time. According to Hamdallah Mustawfi, Nushtagin Shirgir Saljuqi's descendant Baha al-Din Haydar constructed the Haydariyya castle on the location of a fortress.

== Historical sites ==
The following are some of the historical sites in Abhar:

- The mausoleum of Mawlana Qutb al-Din Ahmad al-Abhari, known as Pir Ahmad, situated in the southern part of Abhar.
- The mausoleum of Imamzadeh (Persian: descendant of a Shia Imam) Ismail, a descendant of Ali.
- The mausoleum of Prince Zayd al-Kabir, located in the eastern part of Abhar.
- The mausoleum of Imamzadeh Yahya, who is considered to belong to the line of the 7th Twelver Shia Imam, Musa al-Kazim (died 799).
- Molla Hassan Kashi Mausoleum

== See also ==
Media related to Abhar at Wikimedia Commons

== Sources ==
- Ahmadi, Mohsen (2015). "Abhar". In Madelung, Wilferd; Daftary, Farhad (eds.). Encyclopaedia Islamica Online. Brill Online. ISSN 1875-9831.
- Bosworth, C. E. (1982). "Abhar". In Yarshater, Ehsan (ed.). Encyclopædia Iranica. Vol. I/2: ʿAbd-al-Hamīd–ʿAbd-al-Hamīd. London and New York: Routledge & Kegan Paul. pp. 213–214. ISBN 978-0-71009-091-1.
- Bosworth, C. E. (2000). "Mosaferids". Encyclopaedia Iranica.
- Le Strange, Guy (1905). The Lands of the Eastern Caliphate: Mesopotamia, Persia, and Central Asia from the Moslem Conquest to the Time of Timur. Cambridge University Press.
- Lockhart, L. (1965). "D̲j̲ibāl". In Lewis, B.; Pellat, Ch. & Schacht, J. (eds.). The Encyclopaedia of Islam, Second Edition. Volume II: C–G. Leiden: E. J. Brill. p. 534. doi:10.1163/1573-3912_islam_SIM_2068. OCLC 495469475.
- Madelung, W. (1975). "The Minor Dynasties of Northern Iran". In Frye, Richard N. (ed.). The Cambridge History of Iran: From the Arab Invasion to the Saljuqs. Vol. 4. Cambridge: Cambridge University Press. pp. 198–249. ISBN 0-521-20093-8.
- Madelung, W. (1988). "Banu Sāj". In Yarshater, Ehsan (ed.). Encyclopædia Iranica. Vol. III/7: Banān–Bardesanes. London and New York: Routledge & Kegan Paul. pp. 718–721. ISBN 978-0-71009-119-2.
- Minorsky, V. (1960). "Abhar". In Gibb, H. A. R.; Kramers, J. H.; Lévi-Provençal, E.; Schacht, J.; Lewis, B. & Pellat, Ch. (eds.). The Encyclopaedia of Islam, Second Edition. Volume I: A–B. Leiden: E. J. Brill. p. 98. OCLC 495469456.
- Spuler, Bertold (2014). Iran in the Early Islamic Period: Politics, Culture, Administration and Public Life between the Arab and the Seljuk Conquests, 633-1055. Brill. ISBN 978-90-04-28209-4.
- Tafazzoli, Ahmad (1994). "Dārā(b) (1)". Encyclopædia Iranica, online edition, Vol. VII, Fasc. 1. New York. pp. 1–2.
