= Central District (Abhar County) =

District in Zanjan province, Iran

Central District (Abhar County) Persian: بخش مرکزی شهرستان ابهر
- District
- Location within Iran
- Coordinates: 36°10′40″N 49°08′30″E
- Country: Iran
- Province: Zanjan
- County: Abhar
- Capital: Abhar

Population (2016)
  - Total: 151,528
- Time zone: UTC+3:30 (IRST)

The Central District of Abhar County (Persian: بخش مرکزی شهرستان ابهر) is in Zanjan province, Iran. Its capital is the city of Abhar.

== Demographics ==
=== Population ===
At the time of the 2006 National Census, the district's population was 130,278 in 34,051 households. The following census in 2011 counted 140,584 people in 41,116 households. The 2016 census measured the population of the district as 151,528 inhabitants in 47,329 households.

=== Administrative divisions ===
Central District (Abhar County) Population
Administrative Divisions	2006	2011	2016
Abharrud RD	5,686	5,132	4,734
Darsajiin RD	2,099	1,796	1,197
Dowlatabad RD	4,228	3,225	2,605
Howmeh RD	12,543	6,448	6,045
Sain Qaleh RD	12,005	11,645	10,833
Abhar (city)	70,836	87,396	99,285
Hidaj (city)	11,798	13,003	13,840
Sain Qaleh (city)	11,083	11,939	12,989
Total	130,278	140,584	151,528
RD = Rural District
