= Abhar County =

County in Zanjan province, Iran

Abhar County Persian: شهرستان ابهر
- County
- Location of Abhar County in Zanjan province (right, green)

- Location of Zanjan province in Iran
- Coordinates: 36°10′40″N 49°08′30″E
- Country: Iran
- Province: Zanjan
- Capital: Abhar
- Districts: Central

Population (2016)
  - Total: 151,528
- Time zone: UTC+3:30

Abhar County (Persian: شهرستان ابهر) is in Zanjan province, Iran. Its capital is the city of Abhar.

== History ==
In 2013, Soltaniyeh District was separated from the county in the establishment of Soltaniyeh County.

== Demographics ==
=== Population ===
At the time of the 2006 National Census, Abhar County's population was 158,544 in 41,333 households. The following census in 2011 counted 169,176 people in 49,478 households. The 2016 census measured the population of the county as 151,528 in 47,329 households.

=== Administrative divisions ===
Abhar County's population history and administrative structure over three consecutive censuses are shown in the following table.

Abhar County Population
Administrative Divisions	2006	2011	2016
Central District	130,278	140,584	151,528
Abharrud RD	5,686	5,132	4,734
Darsajin RD	2,099	1,796	1,197
Dowlatabad RD	4,228	3,225	2,605
Howmeh RD	12,543	6,448	6,045
Sain Qaleh RD	12,005	11,645	10,833
Abhar (city)	70,836	87,396	99,285
Hidaj (city)	11,798	13,003	13,840
Sain Qaleh (city)	11,083	11,939	12,989
Soltaniyeh District (Note: Transferred to Soltaniyeh County after the 2011 census)	28,266	28,592	
Guzal Darreh RD	4,959	4,864	
Soltaniyeh RD	9,374	8,656	
Sonbolabad RD	8,069	7,956	
Soltaniyeh (city)	5,864	7,116	
Total	158,544	169,176	151,528
RD = Rural District

== See also ==
Media related to Abhar County at Wikimedia Commons
