= Abbasabad =

Abbasabad or Abbas Abad (Persian: عباس‌آباد) may refer to:

== Historical places ==
- Abbasabad Complex, located 34 kilometers north of Taybad
- Abbasabad Garden, a historical complex of Behshahr in Mazandaran province, Iran

== County ==
Abbasabad County is a county on the Caspian Sea, in Mazandaran Province of northern Iran.

== Azerbaijan ==
- Abbasabad, Azerbaijan, a village and municipality in the Yardımlı region
- Abbasabad (fortress), Nakhchivan Autonomous Republic

== Iran ==
=== Alborz Province ===
- Abbasabad-e Bozorg, a village in Savojbolagh County
- Abbasabad-e Kuchek, a village in Savojbolagh County

=== Ardabil Province ===
- Abbasabad, Ardabil, a village in Ardabil County
- Abbasabad-e Bozorg, Ardabil, a village in Parsabad County

=== Chaharmahal and Bakhtiari Province ===
- Abbasabad, Ardal, a village in Ardal County

=== East Azerbaijan Province ===
- Abbasabad, Heris, a village in Heris County
- Abbasabad, Kaleybar, a village in Kaleybar County
- Abbasabad, Khoda Afarin, a village in Khoda Afarin County
- Abbasabad, Malekan, a village in Malekan County
- Abbasabad, Sarab, a village in Sarab County

=== Fars Province ===
- Abbasabad, Eqlid, a village in Eqlid County
- Abbasabad, Estahban, a village in Estahban County
- Abbasabad, Fasa, a village in Fasa County
- Abbasabad, Jahrom, a village in Jahrom County
- Abbasabad, Khorrambid, a village in Khorrambid County
- Abbasabad, Mamasani, a village in Mamasani County
- Abbasabad, Marvdasht, a village in Marvdasht County
- Abbasabad, Kamfiruz, a village in Marvdasht County
- Abbasabad, Seyyedan, a village in Marvdasht County
- Abbasabad, Neyriz, a village in Neyriz County
- Abbasabad, Sepidan, a village in Sepidan County
- Abbasabad, Shiraz, a village in Shiraz County
- Abbasabad-e Gazak, a village in Shiraz County

=== Gilan Province ===
- Abbasabad, Gilan, a village in Astara County

=== Golestan Province ===
- Abbasabad, Aliabad, a village in Aliabad County
- Abbasabad, Aqqala, a village in Aqqala County
- Abbasabad, Gonbad-e Qabus, a village in Gonbad-e Qabus County
- Abbasabad-e Amelak, a village in Minudasht County

=== Hamadan Province ===
- Abbasabad, Malayer, a village in Malayer County
- Abbasabad, alternate name of Abbasiyeh, Hamadan, a village in Malayer County
- Abbasabad, Nahavand, a village in Nahavand County

=== Hormozgan Province ===
- Abbasabad, Rudan, a village in Rudan County

=== Ilam Province ===
- Abbasabad, Darreh Shahr, a village in Darreh Shahr County
- Abbasabad, Shirvan and Chardaval, a village in Shirvan and Chardaval County

=== Isfahan Province ===
- Abbasabad, Ardestan, a village in Ardestan County
- Abbasabad, Golpayegan, a village in Golpayegan County
- Abbasabad, Isfahan, a village in Isfahan County
- Abbasabad, Kuhpayeh, a village in Isfahan County
- Abbasabad, Kashan, a village in Kashan County
- Abbasabad, Natanz, a village in Natanz County

=== Kerman Province ===
==== Anar County ====
- Abbasabad, Anar, a village in Anar County

==== Anbarabad County ====
- Abbasabad, Anbarabad, a village in Anbarabad County

==== Bardsir County ====
- Abbasabad, Bardsir, a village in Bardsir County
- Abbasabad-e Esfak, a village in Bardsir County
- Abbasabad-e Pamzar, a village in Bardsir County

==== Faryab County ====
- Abbasabad, Faryab, a village in Faryab County
- Abbasabad, alternate name of Chah Narenj, Faryab, a village in Faryab County
- Abbasabad, alternate name of Mowtowr-e Abbasabad, a village in Faryab County
- Abbasabad-e Hur, a village in Faryab County
- Abbasabad-e Sargorich, a village in Faryab County

==== Jiroft County ====
- Abbasabad, Dowlatabad, a village in Jiroft County
- Abbasabad, Esfandaqeh, a village in Jiroft County

==== Kuhbanan County ====
- Abbasabad, Kuhbanan, a village in Kuhbanan County

==== Narmashir County ====
- Abbasabad, Narmashir, a village in Narmashir County

==== Qaleh Ganj County ====
- Abbasabad, Qaleh Ganj, a village in Qaleh Ganj County
- Abbasabad, Sorkh Qaleh, a village in Qaleh Ganj County

==== Rafsanjan County ====
- Abbasabad, Azadegan, a village in Rafsanjan County
- Abbasabad, Eslamiyeh, a village in Rafsanjan County
- Abbasabad, Qasemabad, a village in Rafsanjan County
- Abbasabad-e Amin, a village in Rafsanjan County
- Abbasabad-e Fallah, a village in Rafsanjan County

==== Ravar County ====
- Abbasabad, Ravar, a village in Ravar County

==== Rigan County ====
- Abbasabad, Rigan, a village in Rigan County
- Abbasabad, Gonbaki, a village in Rigan County
- Abbasabad-e Bahrami, a village in Rigan County
- Abbasabad-e Sardar, a village in Rigan County

==== Rudbar-e Jonubi County ====
- Abbasabad Molla Reza, a village in Rudbar-e Jonubi County
- Abbasabad, Jazmurian, a village in Rudbar-e Jonubi County

==== Shahr-e Babak County ====
- Abbasabad, Shahr-e Babak, a village in Shahr-e Babak County

==== Sirjan County ====
- Abbasabad, Najafabad, a village in Sirjan County
- Abbasabad-e Pisht, a village in Sirjan County

==== Zarand County ====
- Abbasabad, Zarand, a village in Zarand County

=== Kermanshah Province ===
- Abbasabad, Kangavar, a village in Kangavar County
- Abbasabad-e Kol Kol, a village in Kermanshah County
- Abbasabad-e Seh Choqa, a village in Kermanshah County
- Abbasabad, Sahneh, a village in Sahneh County
- Abbasabad, Sonqor, a village in Sonqor County

=== Khuzestan Province ===
- Abbasabad-e Ashrafi, a village in Dezful County
- Abbasabad-e Fakhrai, a village in Dezful County
- Abbasabad, Gotvand, a village in Gotvand County

=== Kohgiluyeh and Boyer-Ahmad Province ===
- Abbasabad, Kohgiluyeh and Boyer-Ahmad, a village in Dana County

=== Kurdistan Province ===
- Abbasabad, Baneh, a village in Baneh County
- Abbasabad, Bijar, a village in Bijar County
- Abbasabad, Divandarreh, a village in Divandarreh County
- Abbasabad, Kamyaran, a village in Kamyaran County
- Abbasabad, Sanandaj, a village in Sanandaj County
- Abbasabad, Sarvabad, a village in Sarvabad County

=== Lorestan Province ===
- Abbasabad, Aligudarz, a village in Aligudarz County
- Abbasabad, Borujerd, a village in Borujerd County
- Abbasabad, Delfan, a village in Delfan County
- Abbasabad, Qaleh-ye Mozaffari, a village in Selseleh County
- Abbasabad, Yusefvand, a village in Selseleh County
- Abbasabad Poshteh, a village in Azna County

=== Markazi Province ===
- Abbasabad, Farahan, a village in Farahan County
- Abbasabad, Khomeyn, a village in Khomeyn County
- Abbasabad, alternate name of Qaleh-ye Abbasabad, Khondab, a village in Khondab County
- Abbasabad, alternate name of Qeshlaq-e Abbasabad, a village in Khondab County
- Abbasabad-e Muqufeh, a village in Khondab County
- Abbasabad-e Sanavord, a village in Khondab County
- Abbasabad, Mahallat, a village in Mahallat County
- Abbasabad, Saveh, a village in Saveh County
- Abbasabad, Shazand, a village in Shazand County
- Abbasabad, Kharqan, a village in Zarandieh County
- Abbasabad-e Piazi, a village in Zarandieh County
- Abbasabad-e Qarah Aghaj, a village in Zarandieh County

=== Mazandaran Province ===
- Abbasabad, Mazandaran, a city in Abbasabad County
- Abbasabad, Behshahr, a village in Behshahr County
- Abbasabad, Miandorud, a village in Miandorud County
- Abbasabad, Sari, a village in Sari County

=== North Khorasan Province ===
- Abbasabad, Esfarayen, a village in Esfarayen County
- Abbasabad, Bam and Safiabad, a village in Esfarayen County
- Abbasabad, Jajrom, a village in Jajrom County

=== Qazvin Province ===
- Abbasabad, Buin Zahra, a village in Buin Zahra County
- Abbasabad-e Seyf, a village in Buin Zahra County
- Abbasabad, Qazvin, a village in Qazvin County

=== Qom Province ===
- Abbasabad, Qom, a village in Iran

=== Razavi Khorasan Province ===
- Abbasabad, Chenaran, a village in Chenaran County
- Abbasabad-e Qandi, a village in Joghatai County
- Abbasabad-e Arab, a village in Jowayin County
- Abbasabad-e Malek, a village in Jowayin County
- Abbasabad, Khoshab, a village in Khoshab County
- Abbasabad, Khvaf, a village in Khvaf County
- Abbasabad, Kenevist, a village in Mashhad County
- Abbasabad, Miyan Velayat, a village in Mashhad County
- Abbasabad, Nishapur, a village in Nishapur County
- Abbasabad-e Faramishan, a village in Rashtkhvar County
- Abbasabad-e Jadid, a village in Rashtkhvar County
- Abbasabad, Taybad, a village in Taybad County
- Abbasabad, Torbat-e Heydarieh, a village in Torbat-e Heydarieh County
- Abbasabad-e Kheyrabad, a village in Torbat-e Jam County

=== Semnan Province ===
- Abbasabad, Howmeh, a village in Damghan County
- Abbasabad, Shahrud, a village in Shahrud County

=== Sistan and Baluchestan Province ===
- Abbasabad, Iranshahr, a village in Iranshahr County

=== South Khorasan Province ===
- Abbasabad, Baqeran, a village in Birjand County
- Abbasabad, Kahshang, a village in Birjand County
- Abbasabad, Bandan, a village in Nehbandan County
- Abbasabad, Nehbandan, a village in Nehbandan County
- Abbasabad-e Kollab, a village in Nehbandan County
- Abbasabad-e Talabi, a village in Nehbandan County
- Abbasabad, Qaen, a village in Qaen County
- Abbasabad, Nimbeluk, a village in Qaen County
- Abbasabad-e Dasht, a village in Qaen County
- Abbasabad, Doreh, a village in Sarbisheh County
- Abbasabad, Momenabad, a village in Sarbisheh County
- Abbasabad, Tabas, a village in Tabas County
- Abbasabad, Zirkuh, a village in Zirkuh County

=== Tehran Province ===
- Abbasabad, Damavand, a village in Damavand County
- Abbasabad, Pakdasht, a village in Pakdasht County
- Abbasabad, Rey, a village in Rey County
- Abbasabad, Varamin, a village in Varamin County
- Abbasabad-e Alaqeh Band, a village in Rey County
- Abbasabad-e Gol Shaygan, a village in Malard County
- Abbasabad-e Rostamabad, a village in Tehran County
- Abbasabad-e Zargham, a village in Pakdasht County
- Abbas Abad (Tehran), a neighbourhood of Tehran

=== West Azerbaijan Province ===
- Abbasabad, Akhtachi-ye Sharqi, a village in Bukan County
- Abbasabad, Behi Dehbokri, a village in Bukan County
- Abbasabad, Sardasht, a village in Sardasht County
- Abbasabad, Urmia, a village in Urmia County

=== Yazd Province ===
- Abbasabad, alternate name of Chah-e Seyyed Jelal Sabz, a village in Khatam County
- Abbasabad, Aliabad, Taft, a village in Taft County

=== Zanjan Province ===
- Abbasabad, Zanjan, a village in Abhar County
- Abbasabad-e Olya, Zanjan, a village in Abhar County
- Abbasabad-e Sofla, a village in Abhar County

== See also ==
- Qaleh-ye Abbasabad (disambiguation)
