= Murdan, Faryab =

Village in Kerman province, Iran

Murdan Persian: موردان
- Village
- Location within Iran
- Coordinates: 28°14′29″N 57°05′26″E
- Country: Iran
- Province: Kerman
- County: Faryab
- District: Hur
- Rural District: Zahmakan

Population (2016)
  - Total: 990
- Time zone: UTC+3:30 (IRST)

Murdan (Persian: موردان) (Note: Also romanized as Moordan, Mūrdān, and Mūredān; also known as Mardān) is a village in Zahmakan Rural District of Hur District, Faryab County, Kerman province, Iran.

== Demographics ==
=== Population ===
At the time of the 2006 National Census, the village's population was 831 in 220 households, when it was in Hur Rural District of the former Faryab District of Kahnuj County. The following census in 2011 counted 1,010 people in 282 households, by which time the district had been separated from the county in the establishment of Faryab County. The rural district was transferred to the new Hur District, and Murdan was transferred to Zahmakan Rural District created in the district. The 2016 census measured the population of the village as 990 people in 300 households. It was the most populous village in its rural district.
