= Hur-e Zanjiri =

Neighborhood in Kerman province, Iran

Hur-e Zanjiri Persian: هور زنجیری
- Neighborhood
- Location within Iran
- Coordinates: 28°10′40″N 57°17′28″E
- Country: Iran
- Province: Kerman
- County: Faryab
- District: Hur
- City: Hur-e Pasefid

Population (2016)
  - Total: 758
- Time zone: UTC+3:30 (IRST)

Hur-e Zanjiri (Persian: هور زنجیری) (Note: Also known as Hay-ye Zanjiri-ye Hur (موتور هاي زنجيري حور)) is a neighborhood in the city of Hur-e Pasefid in Hur District of Faryab County, Kerman province, Iran.

== Demographics ==
=== Population ===
At the time of the 2006 National Census, Hur-e Zanjiri's population was 680 in 131 households, when it was a village in Hur Rural District of the former Faryab District of Kahnuj County. The following census in 2011 counted 784 people in 182 households, by which time the district had been separated from the county in the establishment of Faryab County. The rural district was transferred to the new Hur District. The 2016 census measured the population of the village as 758 people in 218 households.

In 2019, the village of Pasefid merged with the villages of Abbasabad-e Hur, Hasan Jahazi, Hur-e Dekan, Hur-e Zanjiri, and Tolombeh-ye Javadani to become the city of Hur-e Pasefid.
