= Hasan Jahazi =

Neighborhood in Kerman province, Iran

Hasan Jahazi Persian: حسن جهازی
- Neighborhood
- Location within Iran
- Coordinates: 28°10′31″N 57°16′36″E
- Country: Iran
- Province: Kerman
- County: Faryab
- District: Hur
- City: Hur-e Pasefid

Population (2016)
  - Total: 284
- Time zone: UTC+3:30 (IRST)

Hasan Jahazi (Persian: حسن جهازی) (Note: Also romanized as Ḩasanjaḥāzī; also known as Hajazi (حجازي), also romanized as Ḩajāzī) is a neighborhood in the city of Hur-e Pasefid in Hur District of Faryab County, Kerman province, Iran.

== Demographics ==
=== Population ===
At the time of the 2006 National Census, Hasan Jahazi's population was 200 in 43 households, when it was a village in Hur Rural District of the former Faryab District of Kahnuj County. The following census in 2011 counted 242 people in 64 households, by which time the district had been separated from the county in the establishment of Faryab County. The rural district was transferred to the new Hur District. The 2016 census measured the population of the village as 284 people in 91 households.

In 2019, the village of Pasefid merged with the villages of Abbasabad-e Hur, Hasan Jahazi, Hur-e Dekan, Hur-e Zanjiri, and Tolombeh-ye Javadani to become the city of Hur-e Pasefid.
