= Aduri, Iran =

Aduri (Persian: ادوري or آدورئ), in Iran, may refer to:

- Aduri, Arzuiyeh (ادوري - Adūrī)
- Aduri, Bam (ادوري - Adūrī)
- Aduri, Faryab (آدورئ - Ādūrī)
- Aduri, Rabor (ادوري - Adūrī)
