= Zahmakan =

Village in Kerman province, Iran

Zahmakan Persian: زهمكان
- Village
- Location within Iran
- Coordinates: 28°18′21″N 57°09′04″E
- Country: Iran
- Province: Kerman
- County: Faryab
- District: Hur
- Rural District: Zahmakan

Population (2016)
  - Total: 631
- Time zone: UTC+3:30 (IRST)

Zahmakan (Persian: زهمكان) (Note: Also romanized as Zahmakān, Zaḩmekān, and Zehmakān) is a village in, and the capital of, Zahmakan Rural District of Hur District, Faryab County, Kerman province, Iran.

== Demographics ==
=== Population ===
At the time of the 2006 National Census, the village's population was 847 in 209 households, when it was in Hur Rural District of the former Faryab District of Kahnuj County. The following census in 2011 counted 778 people in 214 households, by which time the district had been separated from the county in the establishment of Faryab County. The rural district was transferred to the new Hur District, and Zahmakan was transferred to Zahmakan Rural District created in the district. The 2016 census measured the population of the village as 631 people in 190 households.
