= Shurani =

Shurani شوراني
- Village
- Location within Iran
- Coordinates: 28°02′55″N 57°05′57″E
- Country: Iran
- Province: Kerman
- County: Faryab
- Bakhsh: Central
- Rural District: Golashkerd

Population (2006)
  - Total: 167
- Time zone: UTC+3:30 (IRST)
  - Summer (DST): UTC+4:30 (IRDT)

Shurani (Persian: شوراني, also Romanized as Shūrānī; also known as Shūrūni) is a village in Golashkerd Rural District, in the Central District of Faryab County, Kerman Province, Iran. At the 2006 census, its population was 167, in 32 families.
