= Konarreshki =

Konarreshki كناررشكي
- Village
- Location within Iran
- Coordinates: 28°07′24″N 57°31′51″E
- Country: Iran
- Province: Kerman
- County: Faryab
- Bakhsh: Central
- Rural District: Mehruiyeh

Population (2006)
  - Total: 292
- Time zone: UTC+3:30 (IRST)
  - Summer (DST): UTC+4:30 (IRDT)

Konarreshki (Persian: كناررشكي, also Romanized as Konārreshkī) is a village in Mehruiyeh Rural District, in the Central District of Faryab County, Kerman Province, Iran. At the 2006 census, its population was 292, in 52 families.
