= Khoshkar =

Khoshkar خوشکار
- Village
- Location within Iran
- Coordinates: 28°06′42″N 57°15′17″E
- Country: Iran
- Province: Kerman
- County: Faryab
- Bakhsh: Central
- Rural District: Golashkerd

Population (2006)
  - Total: 222
- Time zone: UTC+3:30 (IRST)
  - Summer (DST): UTC+4:30 (IRDT)

Khoshkar (Persian: خوشکار, also Romanized as Khoshkār) is a village in Golashkerd Rural District, in the Central District of Faryab County, Kerman Province, Iran. At the 2006 census, its population was 222, in 47 families.
