= Chah Abdol-e Fariyab =

Chah Abdol-e Fariyab چاه عبدل فارياب
- Village
- Location within Iran
- Coordinates: 28°04′25″N 57°14′53″E
- Country: Iran
- Province: Kerman
- County: Faryab
- Bakhsh: Central
- Rural District: Golashkerd

Population (2006)
  - Total: 154
- Time zone: UTC+3:30 (IRST)
  - Summer (DST): UTC+4:30 (IRDT)

Chah Abdol-e Fariyab (Persian: چاه عبدل فارياب, also Romanized as Chāh ‘Abdol-e Fārīyāb; also known as Chāh ‘Abdol) is a village in Golashkerd Rural District, in the Central District of Faryab County, Kerman Province, Iran. At the 2006 census, its population was 154, in 38 families.
