= Chah Ziarat Daniyal =

Chah Ziarat Daniyal چاه زيارت دانيال
- Village
- Interactive map of Chah Ziarat Daniyal
- Country: Iran
- Province: Kerman
- County: Faryab
- Bakhsh: Central
- Rural District: Golashkerd

Population (2006)
  - Total: 116
- Time zone: UTC+3:30 (IRST)
  - Summer (DST): UTC+4:30 (IRDT)

Chah Ziarat Daniyal (Persian: چاه زيارت دانيال, also Romanized as Chāh Zīārat Dānīyāl) is a village in Golashkerd Rural District, in the Central District of Faryab County, Kerman Province, Iran. At the 2006 census, its population was 116, in 26 families.
