= Eslamabad-e Chah Narenj =

Village in Kerman province, Iran

Eslamabad-e Chah Narenj Persian: اسلام اباد چاه نارنج
- Village
- Location within Iran
- Coordinates: 28°12′13″N 57°22′54″E
- Country: Iran
- Province: Kerman
- County: Faryab
- District: Hur
- Rural District: Hur

Population (2016)
  - Total: 1,577
- Time zone: UTC+3:30 (IRST)

Eslamabad-e Chah Narenj (Persian: اسلام ابادچاه نارنج) (Note: Also romanized as Eslāmābād-e Chāh Nārenj; also known as Eslāmābād) is a village in Hur Rural District of Hur District, Faryab County, Kerman province, Iran.

== Demographics ==
=== Population ===
At the time of the 2006 National Census, the village's population was 872 in 200 households, when it was in the former Faryab District of Kahnuj County). The following census in 2011 counted 1,174 people in 292 households, by which time the district had been separated from the county in the establishment of Faryab County. The rural district was transferred to the new Hur District. The 2016 census measured the population of the village as 1,577 people in 373 households. It was the most populous village in its rural district.
