= Suhtal =

Suhtal سوهتال
- Village
- Location within Iran
- Coordinates: 28°05′28″N 57°14′51″E
- Country: Iran
- Province: Kerman
- County: Faryab
- Bakhsh: Central
- Rural District: Golashkerd

Population (2006)
  - Total: 78
- Time zone: UTC+3:30 (IRST)
  - Summer (DST): UTC+4:30 (IRDT)

Suhtal (Persian: سوهتال, also Romanized as Sūhtāl; also known as Sūtāl) is a village in Golashkerd Rural District, in the Central District of Faryab County, Kerman Province, Iran. At the 2006 census, its population was 78, in 21 families.
