= Ali Zohuran =

Ali Zohuran علي ظهوران
- Village
- Location within Iran
- Coordinates: 28°20′08″N 57°03′18″E
- Country: Iran
- Province: Kerman
- County: Faryab
- Bakhsh: Central
- Rural District: Hur

Population (2006)
  - Total: 173
- Time zone: UTC+3:30 (IRST)
  - Summer (DST): UTC+4:30 (IRDT)

Ali Zohuran (Persian: علي ظهوران, also Romanized as ‘Alī Z̧ohūrān) is a village in Hur Rural District, in the Central District of Faryab County, Kerman Province, Iran. At the 2006 census, its population was 173, in 39 families.
