= Dadalhi =

Dadalhi دادالهي
- Village
- Interactive map of Dadalhi
- Country: Iran
- Province: Kerman
- County: Faryab
- Bakhsh: Central
- Rural District: Golashkerd

Population (2006)
  - Total: 54
- Time zone: UTC+3:30 (IRST)
  - Summer (DST): UTC+4:30 (IRDT)

Dadalhi (Persian: دادالهي, also Romanized as Dādālhī) is a village in Golashkerd Rural District, in the Central District of Faryab County, Kerman Province, Iran. At the 2006 census, its population was 54, in 9 families.
