= Darashnemo-ye Kalmorz =

Darashnemo-ye Kalmorz Kalmorz
- Village
- Location within Iran
- Coordinates: 28°05′48″N 57°30′02″E
- Country: Iran
- Province: Kerman
- County: Faryab
- Bakhsh: Central
- Rural District: Mehruiyeh

Population (2006)
  - Total: 161
- Time zone: UTC+3:30 (IRST)
  - Summer (DST): UTC+4:30 (IRDT)

Darashnemo-ye Kalmorz (Persian: درشنمو کلمرز, also Known as Kalmorz) is a village in Mehruiyeh Rural District, in the Central District of Faryab County, Kerman Province, Iran. At the 2006 census, its population was 161, in 31 families.
