= Sharb-e Mah =

Sharb-e Mah شارب ماء
- Village
- Location within Iran
- Coordinates: 28°02′41″N 57°12′08″E
- Country: Iran
- Province: Kerman
- County: Faryab
- Bakhsh: Central
- Rural District: Golashkerd

Population (2006)
  - Total: 146
- Time zone: UTC+3:30 (IRST)
  - Summer (DST): UTC+4:30 (IRDT)

Sharb-e Mah (Persian: شارب ماء, also Romanized as Shārb-e Māh, Shārb Māh, and Shāreb Māh; also known as Shāh Darreh, Shāh Dowrmeh, Shāh Durmah, Shārb-e Māgh, and Shārīmā) is a village in Golashkerd Rural District, in the Central District of Faryab County, Kerman Province, Iran. At the 2006 census, its population was 146, in 30 families.
