= Boqkerteh =

Boqkerteh بق كرته
- Village
- Location within Iran
- Coordinates: 28°17′40″N 57°03′53″E
- Country: Iran
- Province: Kerman
- County: Faryab
- Bakhsh: Central
- Rural District: Hur

Population (2006)
  - Total: 79
- Time zone: UTC+3:30 (IRST)
  - Summer (DST): UTC+4:30 (IRDT)

Boqkerteh (Persian: بق كرته) is a village in Hur Rural District, in the Central District of Faryab County, Kerman Province, Iran. At the 2006 census, its population was 79, in 20 families.
