= Posht Qaleh =

Posht Qaleh or Poshtqaleh (Persian: پشت قلعه) may refer to:

- Posht Qaleh, Gilan
- Posht Qaleh, Ilam
- Posht Qaleh, Faryab, Kerman Province
- Poshtqaleh, Bam, Kerman Province
- Posht Qaleh, Lorestan
