= Pashmuki =

Pashmuki پشموکی
- village
- Interactive map of Pashmuki
- Coordinates: 28.0864671°N 57.3572099°E
- Country: Iran
- Province: Kerman
- County: Faryab
- Bakhsh: Central
- Rural District: Mehruiyeh

Population (2006)
  - Total: 669
- Time zone: UTC+3:30 (IRST)
  - Summer (DST): UTC+4:30 (IRDT)

Pashmuki (Persian: پشموکی, also Romanized as Pashmukī) is a village in Mehruiyeh Rural District, in the Central District of Faryab County, Kerman Province, Iran. At the 2006 census, its population was 669, in 141 families.
