= Mazraeh-ye Emam, Faryab =

Village in Kerman province, Iran

Mazraeh-ye Emam Persian: مزرعه امام
- Village
- Country: Iran
- Province: Kerman
- County: Faryab
- District: Central
- Rural District: Golashkerd

Population (2016)
  - Total: 661
- Time zone: UTC+3:30 (IRST)

Mazraeh-ye Emam (Persian: مزرعه امام) (Note: Formerly Tolombeh-ye Mansur Brahui (تلمبه منصور براهویی)) is a village in Golashkerd Rural District of the Central District of Faryab County, Kerman province, Iran.

== Demographics ==
=== Population ===
At the time of the 2006 National Census, the village's population (as the village of Tolombeh-ye Mansur Brahui) was 199 in 40 households, when it was in the former Faryab District of Kahnuj County). The following census in 2011 counted 228 people in 57 households, by which time the district had been separated from the county in the establishment of Faryab County. The rural district was transferred to the new Central District. The 2016 census measured the population of the village as 661 people in 190 households, when the village had been renamed Mazraeh-ye Emam. It was the most populous village in its rural district.
