= Mehruiyeh =

Mehruiyeh or Mehrueeyeh (Persian: مهروييه) may refer to:

- Mehruiyeh-ye Bala
- Mehruiyeh-ye Pain
- Mehruiyeh Rural District
