= Sar Gaz Dehnow =

Sar Gaz Dehnow سرگز دهنو
- Village
- Location within Iran
- Coordinates: 28°21′40″N 56°58′40″E
- Country: Iran
- Province: Kerman
- County: Faryab
- Bakhsh: Central
- Rural District: Hur

Population (2006)
  - Total: 197
- Time zone: UTC+3:30 (IRST)
  - Summer (DST): UTC+4:30 (IRDT)

Sar Gaz Dehnow (Persian: سرگز دهنو; also known as Sar Gaz Dehnow-ye ‘Olyā) is a village in Hur Rural District, in the Central District of Faryab County, Kerman Province, Iran. At the 2006 census, its population was 197, in 47 families.
