= Sarney-ye Ashub =

Sarney-ye Ashub سرني اشوب
- Village
- Location within Iran
- Coordinates: 28°19′50″N 57°00′22″E
- Country: Iran
- Province: Kerman
- County: Faryab
- Bakhsh: Central
- Rural District: Hur

Population (2006)
  - Total: 547
- Time zone: UTC+3:30 (IRST)
  - Summer (DST): UTC+4:30 (IRDT)

Sarney-ye Ashub (Persian: سرني اشوب, also Romanized as Sarney-ye Āshūb) is a village in Hur Rural District, in the Central District of Faryab County, Kerman Province, Iran. At the 2006 census, its population was 547, in 127 families.
