= Zangaruiyeh =

Zangaruiyeh زنگاروييه
- Village
- Location within Iran
- Coordinates: 28°04′35″N 57°02′45″E
- Country: Iran
- Province: Kerman
- County: Faryab
- Bakhsh: Central
- Rural District: Golashkerd

Population (2006)
  - Total: 42
- Time zone: UTC+3:30 (IRST)
  - Summer (DST): UTC+4:30 (IRDT)

Zangaruiyeh (Persian: زنگاروييه, also Romanized as Zangārū’īyeh and Zangārū’īeh) is a village in Golashkerd Rural District, in the Central District of Faryab County, Kerman Province, Iran. At the 2006 census, its population was 42, in 11 families.
