= Mehruiyeh-ye Pain =

Village in Kerman province, Iran

Mehruiyeh-ye Pain Persian: مهروييه پايين
- Village
- Location within Iran
- Coordinates: 28°05′15″N 57°24′38″E
- Country: Iran
- Province: Kerman
- County: Faryab
- District: Central
- Rural District: Mehruiyeh

Population (2016)
  - Total: 727
- Time zone: UTC+3:30 (IRST)

Mehruiyeh-ye Pain (Persian: مهروييه پايين) (Note: Also romanized as Mehrūeeyeh-ye Pāeen and Mehrū’īyeh-ye Pā’īn) is a village in, and the capital of, Mehruiyeh Rural District of the Central District of Faryab County, Kerman province, Iran.

== Demographics ==
=== Population ===
At the time of the 2006 National Census, the village's population was 891 in 167 households, when it was in the former Faryab District of Kahnuj County). The following census in 2011 counted 929 people in 247 households, by which time the district had been separated from the county in the establishment of Faryab County. The rural district was transferred to the new Central District. The 2016 census measured the population of the village as 727 people in 216 households. It was the most populous village in its rural district.
