= Kahur Deraz, Faryab =

Kahur Deraz کهور دراز
- Village
- Location within Iran
- Coordinates: 28°05′57″N 57°15′40″E
- Country: Iran
- Province: Kerman
- County: Faryab
- Bakhsh: Central
- Rural District: Golashkerd

Population (2006)
  - Total: 124
- Time zone: UTC+3:30 (IRST)
  - Summer (DST): UTC+4:30 (IRDT)

Kahur Deraz (Persian: کهور دراز, also Romanized as Kahūr Derāz; also known as Kahūrdāz) is a village in Golashkerd Rural District, in the Central District of Faryab County, Kerman Province, Iran. At the 2006 census, its population was 124, in 26 families.
