= Poshteh Qaleh =

Poshteh Qaleh پشته قلعه
- Village
- Location within Iran
- Coordinates: 27°59′19″N 57°14′31″E
- Country: Iran
- Province: Kerman
- County: Faryab
- Bakhsh: Central
- Rural District: Golashkerd

Population (2006)
  - Total: 196
- Time zone: UTC+3:30 (IRST)
  - Summer (DST): UTC+4:30 (IRDT)

Poshteh Qaleh (Persian: پشته قلعه, also Romanized as Poshteh Qal‘eh; also known as Posht Qal‘eh and Qal‘eh-ye Dahaneh-ye Shūr) is a village in Golashkerd Rural District, in the Central District of Faryab County, Kerman Province, Iran. At the 2006 census, its population was 196, in 40 families.
