= Moqarrab =

Moqarrab مقرب
- Village
- Location within Iran
- Coordinates: 28°04′53″N 57°19′50″E
- Country: Iran
- Province: Kerman
- County: Faryab
- Bakhsh: Central
- Rural District: Mehruiyeh

Population (2006)
  - Total: 449
- Time zone: UTC+3:30 (IRST)
  - Summer (DST): UTC+4:30 (IRDT)

Moqarrab (Persian: مقرب; also known as Moqarrabīn) is a village in Mehruiyeh Rural District, in the Central District of Faryab County, Kerman Province, Iran. At the 2006 census, its population was 449, in 99 families.
