= Chah Narenj, Faryab =

Chah Narenj چاه نارنج
- Village
- Location within Iran
- Coordinates: 28°11′18″N 57°23′09″E
- Country: Iran
- Province: Kerman
- County: Faryab
- Bakhsh: Central
- Rural District: Hur

Population (2006)
  - Total: 392
- Time zone: UTC+3:30 (IRST)
  - Summer (DST): UTC+4:30 (IRDT)

Chah Narenj (Persian: چاه نارنج, also Romanized as Chāh Nārenj; also known as ‘Abbāsābād) is a village in Hur Rural District, in the Central District of Faryab County, Kerman Province, Iran. At the 2006 census, its population was 392, in 85 families.
