= Mehruiyeh-ye Bala =

Mehruiyeh-ye Bala مهروييه بالا
- Village
- Location within Iran
- Coordinates: 28°05′47″N 57°25′14″E
- Country: Iran
- Province: Kerman
- County: Faryab
- Bakhsh: Central
- Rural District: Mehruiyeh

Population (2006)
  - Total: 315
- Time zone: UTC+3:30 (IRST)
  - Summer (DST): UTC+4:30 (IRDT)

Mehruiyeh-ye Bala (Persian: مهروييه بالا, also Romanized as Mehrū’īyeh-ye Bālā; also known as Mehrūeeyeh-ye Bālā) is a village in Mehruiyeh Rural District, in the Central District of Faryab County, Kerman Province, Iran. At the 2006 census, its population was 315, in 59 families.
