= Kahur Deraz =

Kahur Deraz (Persian: كهوردراز) may refer to:

- Kahur Deraz, Faryab
- Kahur Deraz, Qaleh Ganj
