= Lachabad =

Lachabad (Persian: لچ اباد or لاچ اباد) may refer to:

- Lachabad, Faryab (لاچ اباد - Lāchābād)
- Lachabad, Rudbar-e Jonubi (لچ اباد - Lachābād)
