= Lachabad, Faryab =

Lachabad لاچ اباد
- Village
- Location within Iran
- Coordinates: 27°59′57″N 57°12′57″E
- Country: Iran
- Province: Kerman
- County: Faryab
- Bakhsh: Central
- Rural District: Golashkerd

Population (2006)
  - Total: 70
- Time zone: UTC+3:30 (IRST)
  - Summer (DST): UTC+4:30 (IRDT)

Lachabad (Persian: لاچ اباد, also Romanized as Lāchābād) is a village in Golashkerd Rural District, in the Central District of Faryab County, Kerman Province, Iran. At the 2006 census, its population was 70, in 16 families.
