= Abbasabad-e Sargorich =

Abbasabad-e Sargorich عباس ابادسرگريچ
- Village
- Location within Iran
- Coordinates: 28°05′26″N 57°27′32″E
- Country: Iran
- Province: Kerman
- County: Faryab
- Bakhsh: Central
- Rural District: Mehruiyeh

Population (2006)
  - Total: 91
- Time zone: UTC+3:30 (IRST)
  - Summer (DST): UTC+4:30 (IRDT)

Abbasabad-e Sargorich (Persian: عباس ابادسرگريچ, also Romanized as ‘Abbāsābād-e Sargorīch) is a village in Mehruiyeh Rural District, in the Central District of Faryab County, Kerman Province, Iran. At the 2006 census, its population was 91, in 21 families.
