= Muqarrab =

Muqarrab, Moqarreb or Moqarrab (Persian: مقرب), also rendered as Mogharrab, may refer to:

- Muqarrab (Sufism), a follower in Sufism
- Muqarrab Khan, 17th-century Indian commander
- Moqarrab-e Yek, Fars Province
- Mogharrab-e Do, Fars Province
- Moqarrab, Kerman Province
