= Qaleh-ye Abbasabad =

Qaleh-ye Abbasabad (Persian: قلعه عباس اباد) may refer to:

- Qaleh-ye Abbasabad, Fars
- Qaleh-ye Abbasabad, Khondab, Markazi Province
- Qaleh-ye Abbasabad, Shazand, Markazi Province
