= Zahmakan Rural District =

Rural district in Kerman province, Iran

Zahmakan Rural District Persian: دهستان زهمکان
- Rural District
- Location within Iran
- Coordinates: 28°19′33″N 57°04′05″E
- Country: Iran
- Province: Kerman
- County: Faryab
- District: Hur
- Capital: Zahmakan

Population (2016)
  - Total: 3,986
- Time zone: UTC+3:30 (IRST)

Zahmakan Rural District (Persian: دهستان زهمکان) is in Hur District of Faryab County, Kerman province, Iran. Its capital is the village of Zahmakan.

== History ==
After the 2006 National Census, Faryab District was separated from Kahnuj County in the establishment of Faryab County, and Zahmakan Rural District was created in the new Hur District.

== Demographics ==
=== Population ===
At the time of the 2011 census, the rural district's population was 3,504 in 963 households. The 2016 census measured the population of the rural district as 3,986 in 1,229 households. The most populous of its 21 villages was Murdan, with 990 people.
