= Abas-Abad =

Abas-Abad may refer to:

- Abbasabad, Azerbaijan
- Asadabad, Yardymli, Azerbaijan
