= Hur-e Pasefid =

City in Kerman province, Iran

Hur-e Pasefid Persian: هور پاسفید
- City
- Location within Iran
- Coordinates: 28°10′55″N 57°17′45″E
- Country: Iran
- Province: Kerman
- County: Faryab
- District: Hur

Population (2016)
  - Total: 673
- Time zone: UTC+3:30 (IRST)

Hur-e Pasefid (Persian: هور پاسفید) (Note: Also known as Pasefid (پاسفید)) is a city in, and the capital of, Hur District of Faryab County, Kerman province, Iran. It also serves as the administrative center for Hur Rural District.

== Demographics ==
=== Population ===
At the time of the 2006 National Census, Hur-e Pasefid's population (as the village of Pasefid) was 504 in 107 households, when it was in Hur Rural District of the former Faryab District of Kahnuj County. The following census in 2011 counted 629 people in 170 households, by which time the district had been separated from the county in the establishment of Faryab County. The rural district was transferred to the new Hur District. The 2016 census measured the population as 673 people in 201 households.

In 2019, Pasefid merged with the villages of Abbasabad-e Hur, Hasan Jahazi, Hur-e Dekan, Hur-e Zanjiri, and Tolombeh-ye Javadani to become the city of Hur-e Pasefid.
