= Sareshk =

Sareshk or Sereshk (Persian: سرشك) may refer to:

- Sereshk, Isfahan
- Sareshk, Kerman
- Sareshk, Yazd
