= Chal Chuq =

Village in Zanjan province, Iran

Chal Chuq Persian: چالچوق
- Village
- Location within Iran
- Coordinates: 36°06′46″N 49°04′57″E
- Country: Iran
- Province: Zanjan
- County: Abhar
- District: Central
- Rural District: Abharrud

Population (2016)
  - Total: 31
- Time zone: UTC+3:30 (IRST)

Chal Chuq (Persian: چالچوق) (Note: Also romanized as Chāl Chūq) is a village in Abharrud Rural District of the Central District in Abhar County, Zanjan province, Iran.

== Demographics ==
=== Population ===
At the time of the 2006 National Census, the village's population was 137 in 24 households. The following census in 2011 counted 41 people in 10 households. The 2016 census measured the population of the village as 31 people in nine households.
