= Zarah Bash =

Village in Zanjan province, Iran

Zarah Bash Persian: زره باش
- Village
- Location within Iran
- Coordinates: 36°09′19″N 48°59′32″E
- Country: Iran
- Province: Zanjan
- County: Abhar
- District: Central
- Rural District: Abharrud

Population (2016)
  - Total: 293
- Time zone: UTC+3:30 (IRST)

Zarah Bash (Persian: زره باش) (Note: Also romanized as Zarah Bāsh and Zareh Bāsh; also known as Zar Bāsh, Zarabāsh, and Zard Bāsh) is a village in Abharrud Rural District of the Central District in Abhar County, Zanjan province, Iran.

== Demographics ==
=== Population ===
At the time of the 2006 National Census, the village's population was 406 in 90 households. The following census in 2011 counted 377 people in 99 households. The 2016 census measured the population of the village as 293 people in 91 households.
