= Espas, Zanjan =

Village in Zanjan province, Iran

Espas Persian: اسپاس
- Village
- Location within Iran
- Coordinates: 36°09′45″N 49°06′21″E
- Country: Iran
- Province: Zanjan
- County: Abhar
- District: Central
- Rural District: Abharrud

Population (2016)
  - Total: 281
- Time zone: UTC+3:30 (IRST)

Espas (Persian: اسپاس) (Note: Also romanized as Espās; also known as Īsbāz and Ispas) is a village in Abharrud Rural District of the Central District in Abhar County, Zanjan province, Iran.

== Demographics ==
=== Population ===
At the time of the 2006 National Census, the village's population was 383 in 102 households. The following census in 2011 counted 344 people in 101 households. The 2016 census measured the population of the village as 281 people in 87 households.
