= Meymundarreh =

Village in Zanjan province, Iran

Meymundarreh Persian: ميموندره
- Village
- Location within Iran
- Coordinates: 36°07′56″N 49°08′13″E
- Country: Iran
- Province: Zanjan
- County: Abhar
- District: Central
- Rural District: Abharrud

Population (2016)
  - Total: 662
- Time zone: UTC+3:30 (IRST)

Meymundarreh (Persian: ميموندره) (Note: Also romanized as Meymun Darreh and Meymūn Darreh; also known as Mehmāndār, Mehmāndarreh, Mihmūndar, and Mikhmundar) is a village in Abharrud Rural District of the Central District in Abhar County, Zanjan province, Iran.

== Demographics ==
=== Population ===
At the time of the 2006 National Census, the village's population was 1,028 in 252 households. The following census in 2011 counted 860 people in 228 households. The 2016 census measured the population of the village as 662 people in 196 households.
