= Qarah Aghaj, Abhar =

Village in Zanjan province, Iran

Qarah Aghaj Persian: قره اغاج
- Village
- Location within Iran
- Coordinates: 36°07′16″N 49°00′55″E
- Country: Iran
- Province: Zanjan
- County: Abhar
- District: Central
- Rural District: Abharrud

Population (2016)
  - Total: 101
- Time zone: UTC+3:30 (IRST)

Qarah Aghaj (Persian: قره اغاج) (Note: Also romanized as Qarah Āghāj; also known as Qareh Āqāj) is a village in Abharrud Rural District of the Central District in Abhar County, Zanjan province, Iran.

== Demographics ==
=== Population ===
At the time of the 2006 National Census, the village's population was 99 in 18 households. The following census in 2011 counted 110 people in 26 households. The 2016 census measured the population of the village as 101 people in 36 households.
