= Qezeljeh, Abhar =

Village in Zanjan province, Iran

Qezeljeh Persian: قزلجه
- Village
- Location within Iran
- Coordinates: 36°05′52″N 48°59′34″E
- Country: Iran
- Province: Zanjan
- County: Abhar
- District: Central
- Rural District: Abharrud

Population (2016)
  - Total: 166
- Time zone: UTC+3:30 (IRST)

Qezeljeh (Persian: قزلجه) is a village in Abharrud Rural District of the Central District in Abhar County, Zanjan province, Iran.

== Demographics ==
=== Population ===
At the time of the 2006 National Census, the village's population was 222 in 48 households. The following census in 2011 counted 153 people in 37 households. The 2016 census measured the population of the village as 166 people in 48 households.
