= Abharrud Rural District =

Rural district in Zanjan province, Iran

Abharrud Rural District Persian: دهستان ابهررود
- Rural District
- Location within Iran
- Coordinates: 36°07′N 49°04′E
- Country: Iran
- Province: Zanjan
- County: Abhar
- District: Central
- Established: 1987
- Capital: Kineh Vars

Population (2016)
  - Total: 4,734
- Time zone: UTC+3:30 (IRST)

Abharrud Rural District (Persian: دهستان ابهررود) is in the Central District of Abhar County, Zanjan province, Iran. Its capital is the village of Kineh Vars.

== Demographics ==
=== Population ===
At the time of the 2006 National Census, the rural district's population was 5,686 in 1,300 households. There were 5,132 inhabitants in 1,450 households at the following census of 2011. The 2016 census measured the population of the rural district as 4,734 in 1,492 households. The most populous of its 13 villages was Funeshabad, with 1,762 people.

=== Other villages in the rural district ===
- Abbasabad-e Olya
- Abbasabad-e Sofla
- Chal Chuq
- Espas
- Meymundarreh
- Qafasabad
- Qarah Aghaj
- Qezeljeh
- Zarah Bash
