= Funeshabad =

Village in Zanjan province, Iran

Funeshabad Persian: فونش اباد
- Village
- Location within Iran
- Coordinates: 36°09′58″N 49°11′39″E
- Country: Iran
- Province: Zanjan
- County: Abhar
- District: Central
- Rural District: Abharrud

Population (2016)
  - Total: 1,762
- Time zone: UTC+3:30 (IRST)

Funeshabad (Persian: فونش اباد) (Note: Also romanized as Fūneshābād; also known as Fonūshābād, Panishabad, Pīshābād, and Qūneshābād) is a village in Abharrud Rural District of the Central District in Abhar County, Zanjan province, Iran.

== Demographics ==
=== Population ===
At the time of the 2006 National Census, the village's population was 1,627 in 370 households. The following census in 2011 counted 1,740 people in 502 households. The 2016 census measured the population of the village as 1,762 people in 582 households. It was the most populous village in its rural district.
