= Qafasabad =

Village in Zanjan province, Iran

Qafasabad Persian: قفس‌آباد
- Village
- Location within Iran
- Coordinates: 36°08′42″N 48°56′34″E
- Country: Iran
- Province: Zanjan
- County: Abhar
- District: Central
- Rural District: Abharrud

Population (2016)
  - Total: 435
- Time zone: UTC+3:30 (IRST)

Qafasabad (Persian: قفس‌آباد) (Note: Also romanized as Qafasābād; also known as Feyzābād, Kābasābād, Kabsabad, and Qabasābād) is a village in Abharrud Rural District of the Central District in Abhar County, Zanjan province, Iran.

== Demographics ==
=== Population ===
At the time of the 2006 National Census, the village's population was 487 in 99 households. The following census in 2011 counted 418 people in 120 households. The 2016 census measured the population of the village as 435 people in 129 households.
