= Kineh Vars =

Village in Zanjan province, Iran

Kineh Vars Persian: كينه ورس
- Village
- Location within Iran
- Coordinates: 36°09′25″N 49°03′22″E
- Country: Iran
- Province: Zanjan
- County: Abhar
- District: Central
- Rural District: Abharrud

Population (2016)
  - Total: 647
- Time zone: UTC+3:30 (IRST)

Kineh Vars (Persian: كينه ورس) (Note: Also romanized as Kīneh Vars; also known as Kinavaris and Kīneh Varz) is a village in, and the capital of, Abharrud Rural District in the Central District of Abhar County, Zanjan province, Iran.

== Demographics ==
=== Language and religion ===
Residents speak Azerbaijani and their religion is Shia Islam (Twelver).

=== Population ===
At the time of the 2006 National Census, the village's population was 703 in 184 households. The following census in 2011 counted 606 people in 189 households. The 2016 census measured the population of the village as 647 people in 200 households.
