= Abbasabad, Divandarreh =

Abbasabad عباس آباد
- Village
- Location within Iran
- Coordinates: 36°00′31″N 46°45′50″E
- Country: Iran
- Province: Kurdistan
- County: Divandarreh
- Bakhsh: Central
- Rural District: Chehel Cheshmeh

Population (2006)
  - Total: 39
- Time zone: UTC+3:30 (IRST)
  - Summer (DST): UTC+4:30 (IRDT)

Abbasabad (Persian: عباس آباد, also Romanized as ‘Abbāsābād) is a village in Chehel Cheshmeh Rural District, in the Central District of Divandarreh County, Kurdistan Province, Iran. At the 2006 census, its population was 39, in 7 families. The village is populated by Kurds.
