= Kahur Deraz, Qaleh Ganj =

Kahur Deraz كهوردراز
- Village
- Location within Iran
- Coordinates: 27°41′12″N 58°07′43″E
- Country: Iran
- Province: Kerman
- County: Qaleh Ganj
- Bakhsh: Central
- Rural District: Sorkh Qaleh

Population (2006)
  - Total: 87
- Time zone: UTC+3:30 (IRST)
  - Summer (DST): UTC+4:30 (IRDT)

Kahur Deraz (Persian: كهوردراز, also Romanized as Kahūr Derāz) is a village in Sorkh Qaleh Rural District, in the Central District of Qaleh Ganj County, Kerman Province, Iran. At the 2006 census, its population was 87, in 25 families.
