= Abbasabad, Sanandaj =

Abbasabad عباس آباد
- Village
- Location within Iran
- Coordinates: 35°31′22″N 47°05′35″E
- Country: Iran
- Province: Kurdistan
- County: Sanandaj
- Bakhsh: Central
- Rural District: Hoseynabad-e Jonubi

Population (2006)
  - Total: 55
- Time zone: UTC+3:30 (IRST)
  - Summer (DST): UTC+4:30 (IRDT)

Abbasabad (Persian: عباس آباد, also Romanized as ‘Abbāsābād) is a village in Hoseynabad-e Jonubi Rural District, in the Central District of Sanandaj County, Kurdistan Province, Iran. At the 2006 census, its population was 55, in 14 families. The village is populated by Kurds.
