= Posht Qaleh, Lorestan =

Posht Qaleh پشت قلعه
- Village
- Location within Iran
- Coordinates: 33°28′33″N 49°03′05″E
- Country: Iran
- Province: Lorestan
- County: Dorud
- Bakhsh: Central
- Rural District: Dorud

Population (2006)
  - Total: 453
- Time zone: UTC+3:30 (IRST)
  - Summer (DST): UTC+4:30 (IRDT)

Posht Qaleh (Persian: پشت قلعه, also Romanized as Posht Qal‘eh; also known as Qal‘eh) is a village in Dorud Rural District, in the Central District of Dorud County, Lorestan Province, Iran. At the 2006 census, its population was 453, in 98 families.
