= Abbasabad, Kahshang =

Abbasabad عباس‌آباد
- Village
- Location within Iran
- Coordinates: 33°03′32″N 59°24′17″E
- Country: Iran
- Province: South Khorasan
- County: Birjand
- Bakhsh: Central
- Rural District: Kahshang

Population (2016)
  - Total: 30
- Time zone: UTC+3:30 (IRST)
  - Summer (DST): UTC+4:30 (IRDT)

Abbasabad (Persian: عباس آباد, also Romanized as ‘Abbāsābād; also known as Kalāteh-ye ‘Abbāsābād) is a village in Kahshang Rural District, in the Central District of Birjand County, South Khorasan Province, Iran. At the 2016 census, its population was 30, in 9 families.
