= Abbasabad, Eqlid =

Abbasabad عباس آباد
- Village
- Location within Iran
- Coordinates: 30°28′43″N 52°15′20″E
- Country: Iran
- Province: Fars
- County: Eqlid
- Bakhsh: Hasanabad
- Rural District: Bakan

Population (2016)
  - Total: 326
- Time zone: UTC+3:30 (IRST)

Abbasabad (Persian: عباس آباد, also Romanized as 'Abbāsābād) is a village in Bakan Rural District, Hasanabad District, Eqlid County, Fars province, Iran. At the 2016 census, its population was 326, in 97 families. Up from 315 in 2006.
