= Abbasabad, Marvdasht =

Abbasabad عباس آباد
- Village
- Location within Iran
- Coordinates: 29°57′28″N 52°35′58″E
- Country: Iran
- Province: Fars
- County: Marvdasht
- Bakhsh: Central
- Rural District: Majdabad

Population (2016)
  - Total: 396
- Time zone: UTC+3:30 (IRST)

Abbasabad (Persian: عباس آباد, also Romanized as 'Abbāsābād; also known as 'Abbāsābād-e Rāmjerd and Abbas Abad Ramjerd) is a village in Majdabad Rural District, in the Central District of Marvdasht County, Fars province, Iran. At the 2016 census, its population was 396, in 103 families. Down from 505 people in 2006.
