= Abbasabad-e Pisht =

Abbasabad-e Pisht عباس ابادپيشت
- Village
- Location within Iran
- Coordinates: 29°33′18″N 55°30′29″E
- Country: Iran
- Province: Kerman
- County: Sirjan
- Bakhsh: Central
- Rural District: Zeydabad

Population (2006)
  - Total: 65
- Time zone: UTC+3:30 (IRST)
  - Summer (DST): UTC+4:30 (IRDT)

Abbasabad-e Pisht (Persian: عباس ابادپيشت, also Romanized as ‘Abbāsābād-e Pīsht; also known as ‘Abbāsābād) is a village in Zeydabad Rural District, in the Central District of Sirjan County, Kerman Province, Iran. At the 2006 census, its population was 65, in 23 families.
