= Abbasabad-e Fakhrai =

Abbasabad-e Fakhrai عباس ابادفخرايي
- Village
- Location within Iran
- Coordinates: 32°16′04″N 48°21′04″E
- Country: Iran
- Province: Khuzestan
- County: Dezful
- Bakhsh: Central
- Rural District: Qeblehi

Population (2006)
  - Total: 403
- Time zone: UTC+3:30 (IRST)
  - Summer (DST): UTC+4:30 (IRDT)

Abbasabad-e Fakhrai (Persian: عباس ابادفخرايي, also Romanized as ‘Abbāsābād-e Fakhrā”ī; also known as ‘Abbāsābād) is a village in Qeblehi Rural District, in the Central District of Dezful County, Khuzestan Province, Iran. At the 2006 census, its population was 403, in 89 families.
