= Abbasabad-e Kol Kol =

Abbasabad-e Kol Kol عباس ابادكل كل
- Village
- Location within Iran
- Coordinates: 34°29′29″N 46°32′52″E
- Country: Iran
- Province: Kermanshah
- County: Kermanshah
- Bakhsh: Kuzaran
- Rural District: Sanjabi

Population (2006)
  - Total: 204
- Time zone: UTC+3:30 (IRST)
  - Summer (DST): UTC+4:30 (IRDT)

Abbasabad-e Kol Kol (Persian: عباس ابادكل كل, also Romanized as ‘Abbāsābād-e Kol Kol; also known as ‘Abbāsābād-e Gol Gol) is a village in Sanjabi Rural District, Kuzaran District, Kermanshah County, Kermanshah Province, Iran. At the 2006 census, its population was 204, in 33 families.
