= Abbasabad, Golpayegan =

Abbasabad عباس اباد
- Village
- Location within Iran
- Coordinates: 33°24′46″N 50°06′03″E
- Country: Iran
- Province: Isfahan
- County: Golpayegan
- Bakhsh: Central
- Rural District: Kenarrudkhaneh

Population (2006)
  - Total: 72
- Time zone: UTC+3:30 (IRST)
  - Summer (DST): UTC+4:30 (IRDT)

Abbasabad (Persian: عباس اباد, also Romanized as ‘Abbāsābād) is a village in Kenarrudkhaneh Rural District, in the Central District of Golpayegan County, Isfahan Province, Iran. At the 2006 census, its population was 72, in 27 families.
