= Abbasabad-e Ashrafi =

Abbasabad-e Ashrafi عباس اباداشرفي
- Village
- Location within Iran
- Coordinates: 32°16′48″N 48°18′00″E
- Country: Iran
- Province: Khuzestan
- County: Dezful
- Bakhsh: Central
- Rural District: Qeblehi

Population (2006)
  - Total: 258
- Time zone: UTC+3:30 (IRST)
  - Summer (DST): UTC+4:30 (IRDT)

Abbasabad-e Ashrafi (Persian: عباس اباداشرفي, also Romanized as ʿAbbāsābād-e Āshrafī; also known as ʿAbbāsābād) is a village in Qeblehi Rural District, in the Central District of Dezful County, Khuzestan Province, Iran. At the 2006 census, its population was 258, in 52 families.
