= Abval-e Abbasabad =

Abval-e Abbasabad ابوالعباس اباد
- Village
- Location within Iran
- Coordinates: 33°58′18″N 51°22′15″E
- Country: Iran
- Province: Isfahan
- County: Kashan
- Bakhsh: Central
- Rural District: Kuhpayeh

Population (2006)
  - Total: 16
- Time zone: UTC+3:30 (IRST)
  - Summer (DST): UTC+4:30 (IRDT)

Abval-e Abbasabad (Persian: ابوالعباس اباد, also Romanized as Ābvāl-e ‘Abbāsābād; also known as ‘Abbāsābād) is a village in Kuhpayeh Rural District, in the Central District of Kashan County, Isfahan Province, Iran. At the 2006 census, its population was 16, in 6 families.
