= Faryab, Iran =

City in Kerman province, Iran

Faryab Persian: فاریاب
- City
- Nickname: Land of canals
- Location within Iran
- Coordinates: 28°05′52″N 57°13′55″E
- Country: Iran
- Province: Kerman
- County: Faryab
- District: Central

Population (2016)
  - Total: 4,863
- Time zone: UTC+3:30 (IRST)

Faryab (Persian: فاریاب) (Note: Also romanized as Fārīāb, Fariyab, and Fāryāb; also known as Pārīāb, Paryāb, Pāy Āb, and Shahmorādi-ye Fāryāb) is a city in the Central District of Faryab County, Kerman province, Iran, serving as capital of both the county and the district. It is also the administrative center for Golashkerd Rural District.

The city is a centre for Posatio and saffron production and is known for its quanats which it depends on being on the edge of the Lut Desert .

== Demographics ==
=== Population ===
At the time of the 2006 National Census, the city's population was 4,508 in 971 households, when it was capital of the former Faryab District of Kahnuj County. The following census in 2011 counted 6,025 people in 1,369 households, by which time the district had been separated from the county in the establishment of Faryab County. Faryab was transferred to the new Central District as the county's capital. The 2016 census measured the population of the city as 4,863 people in 1,343 households.
