= Abbasabad, Buin Zahra =

Abbasabad عباس اباد
- Village
- Location within Iran
- Coordinates: 35°45′53″N 49°18′50″E
- Country: Iran
- Province: Qazvin
- County: Avaj
- Bakhsh: Abgarm
- Rural District: Abgarm

Population (2006)
  - Total: 218
- Time zone: UTC+3:30 (IRST)
  - Summer (DST): UTC+4:30 (IRDT)

Abbasabad (Persian: عباس اباد, also Romanized as ‘Abbāsābād; also known as Abbas Abad Kharaghan Sharghi) is a village in Abgarm Rural District, Abgarm District, Avaj County, Qazvin Province, Iran. At the 2006 census, its population was 218, in 58 families.
