= Poshtqaleh, Bam =

Poshtqaleh پشت قلعه
- Village
- Location within Iran
- Coordinates: 29°20′24″N 57°55′12″E
- Country: Iran
- Province: Kerman
- County: Bam
- Bakhsh: Central
- Rural District: Howmeh

Population (2006)
  - Total: 413
- Time zone: UTC+3:30 (IRST)
  - Summer (DST): UTC+4:30 (IRDT)

Poshtqaleh (Persian: پشت قلعه, also Romanized as Poshtqalʿeh) is a village in Howmeh Rural District, in the Central District of Bam County, Kerman Province, Iran. At the 2006 census, its population was 413, in 113 families.
