= Aduri, Bam =

Aduri ادوري
- Village
- Location within Iran
- Coordinates: 28°58′15″N 58°07′15″E
- Country: Iran
- Province: Kerman
- County: Bam
- Bakhsh: Central
- Rural District: Howmeh

Population (2006)
  - Total: 120
- Time zone: UTC+3:30 (IRST)
  - Summer (DST): UTC+4:30 (IRDT)

Aduri (Persian: ادوري, also Romanized as Ādūrī) is a village in Howmeh Rural District, in the Central District of Bam County, Kerman Province, Iran. At the 2006 census, its population was 120, in 34 families.
