= Abbasabad, Sorkh Qaleh =

Abbasabad عباس اباد
- Village
- Location within Iran
- Coordinates: 27°40′29″N 58°03′28″E
- Country: Iran
- Province: Kerman
- County: Qaleh Ganj
- Bakhsh: Central
- Rural District: Sorkh Qaleh

Population (2006)
  - Total: 816
- Time zone: UTC+3:30 (IRST)
  - Summer (DST): UTC+4:30 (IRDT)

Abbasabad (Persian: عباس اباد, also Romanized as ʿAbbāsābād) is a village in Sorkh Qaleh Rural District, in the Central District of Qaleh Ganj County, Kerman Province, Iran. At the 2006 census, its population was 816, in 149 families.
