= Abbasabad-e Sofla =

Village in Zanjan province, Iran

Abbasabad-e Sofla Persian: عباس ابادسفلي
- Village
- Location within Iran
- Coordinates: 36°04′32″N 48°59′40″E
- Country: Iran
- Province: Zanjan
- County: Abhar
- District: Central
- Rural District: Abharrud

Population (2016)
  - Total: 338
- Time zone: UTC+3:30 (IRST)

Abbasabad-e Sofla (Persian: عباس ابادسفلي) (Note: Also romanized as ‘Abbāsābād-e Soflá; also known as ‘Abbāsābād-e Pā’īn) is a village in Abharrud Rural District of the Central District in Abhar County, Zanjan province, Iran.

== Demographics ==
=== Population ===
At the time of the 2006 National Census, the village's population was 505 in 98 households. The following census in 2011 counted 435 people in 127 households. The 2016 census measured the population of the village as 338 people in 107 households.
