= Aduri, Rabor =

Aduri ادوري
- Village
- Location within Iran
- Coordinates: 28°58′21″N 57°03′22″E
- Country: Iran
- Province: Kerman
- County: Rabor
- Bakhsh: Hanza
- Rural District: Javaran

Population (2006)
  - Total: 54
- Time zone: UTC+3:30 (IRST)
  - Summer (DST): UTC+4:30 (IRDT)

Aduri (Persian: ادوري, also Romanized as Ādūrī) is a village in Javaran Rural District, Hanza District, Rabor County, Kerman Province, Iran. At the 2006 census, its population was 54, in 15 families.
