= Abbasabad-e Talabi =

Abbasabad-e Talabi عباس اباد طالبي
- Village
- Country: Iran
- Province: South Khorasan
- County: Nehbandan
- Bakhsh: Shusef
- Rural District: Shusef

Population (2006)
  - Total: 44
- Time zone: UTC+3:30 (IRST)
  - Summer (DST): UTC+4:30 (IRDT)

Abbasabad-e Talabi (Persian: عباس اباد طالبي, also Romanized as ‘Abbāsābād-e Tālabī) is a village in Shusef Rural District, Shusef District, Nehbandan County, South Khorasan Province, Iran. At the 2006 census, its population was 44, in 13 families.
