= Abbasabad-e Amin =

Abbasabad-e Amin عباس ابادامين
- Village
- Location within Iran
- Coordinates: 30°31′30″N 55°43′36″E
- Country: Iran
- Province: Kerman
- County: Rafsanjan
- Bakhsh: Koshkuiyeh
- Rural District: Koshkuiyeh

Population (2006)
  - Total: 282
- Time zone: UTC+3:30 (IRST)
  - Summer (DST): UTC+4:30 (IRDT)

Abbasabad-e Amin (Persian: عباس ابادامين, also Romanized as ‘Abbāsābād-e Amīn; also known as Abbas Abad Amini and) is a village in Koshkuiyeh Rural District, Koshkuiyeh District, Rafsanjan County, Kerman Province, Iran. At the 2006 census, its population was 282, in 68 families.
