= Abbasabad, Kenevist =

Abbasabad عباس اباد
- Village
- Location within Iran
- Coordinates: 36°16′44″N 59°40′57″E
- Country: Iran
- Province: Razavi Khorasan
- County: Mashhad
- Bakhsh: Central
- Rural District: Kenevist

Population (2006)
  - Total: 2,536
- Time zone: UTC+3:30 (IRST)
  - Summer (DST): UTC+4:30 (IRDT)

Abbasabad (Persian: عباس اباد, also Romanized as ‘Abbāsābād) is a village in Kenevist Rural District, in the Central District of Mashhad County, Razavi Khorasan Province, Iran. At the 2006 census, its population was 2,536, in 629 families.

== See also ==
- List of cities, towns and villages in Razavi Khorasan Province
