= Abbasabad, Jahrom =

Abbasabad عباس آباد
- Village
- Location within Iran
- Coordinates: 29°01′10″N 53°00′31″E
- Country: Iran
- Province: Fars
- County: Khafr
- Bakhsh: Central
- Rural District: Sefidar

Population (2016)
  - Total: 77
- Time zone: UTC+3:30 (IRST)

Abbasabad (Persian: عباس آباد, also Romanized as 'Abbāsābād) is a village in Sefidar Rural District of Khafr County, Fars province, Iran. At the 2016 census, its population was 77, in 26 families. Up from 43 people in 2006.
