= Abbasabad, Sarvabad =

Abbasabad عباس اباد
- Village
- Location within Iran
- Coordinates: 35°11′54″N 46°23′04″E
- Country: Iran
- Province: Kurdistan
- County: Sarvabad
- Bakhsh: Uraman
- Rural District: Shalyar

Population (2006)
  - Total: 119
- Time zone: UTC+3:30 (IRST)
  - Summer (DST): UTC+4:30 (IRDT)

Abbasabad (Persian: عباس اباد, also Romanized as ‘Abbāsābād) is a village in Shalyar Rural District, Uraman District, Sarvabad County, Kurdistan Province, Iran. At the 2006 census, its population was 119, in 26 families. The village is populated by Kurds.
