= Abbasabad, Kamfiruz =

Abbasabad عباس آباد
- Village
- Location within Iran
- Coordinates: 30°18′25″N 52°15′50″E
- Country: Iran
- Province: Fars
- County: Marvdasht
- Bakhsh: Kamfiruz
- Rural District: Kamfiruz-e Jonubi

Population (2016)
  - Total: 1,183
- Time zone: UTC+3:30 (IRST)

Abbasabad (Persian: عباس آباد, also Romanized as 'Abbāsābād; also known as Qal‘eh Cham) is a village in Kamfiruz-e Jonubi Rural District, Kamfiruz District, Marvdasht County, Fars province, Iran. At the 2006 census, its population was 1,252, in 208 families. In 2016, it had 1,183 people in 266 households.
