= Moqarrab-e Yek =

Moqarrab-e Yek مقرب يك
- Village
- Location within Iran
- Coordinates: 29°41′08″N 52°59′47″E
- Country: Iran
- Province: Fars
- County: Shiraz
- Bakhsh: Zarqan
- Rural District: Rahmatabad

Population (2006)
  - Total: 338
- Time zone: UTC+3:30 (IRST)
  - Summer (DST): UTC+4:30 (IRDT)

Moqarrab-e Yek (Persian: مقرب يك; also known as Moqarrab) is a village in Rahmatabad Rural District, Zarqan District, Shiraz County, Fars province, Iran. At the 2006 census, its population was 338, in 80 families.
