= Abbasabad-e Esfak =

Abbasabad-e Esfak عباس اباداسفك
- Village
- Location within Iran
- Coordinates: 29°55′37″N 56°25′34″E
- Country: Iran
- Province: Kerman
- County: Bardsir
- Bakhsh: Central
- Rural District: Kuh Panj

Population (2006)
  - Total: 43
- Time zone: UTC+3:30 (IRST)
  - Summer (DST): UTC+4:30 (IRDT)

Abbasabad-e Esfak (Persian: عباس اباداسفك, also Romanized as ‘Abbāsābād-e Esfak; also known as ‘Abbāsābād) is a village in Kuh Panj Rural District, in the Central District of Bardsir County, Kerman Province, Iran. At the 2006 census, its population was 43, in 11 families.
