= Abbasabad, Neyriz =

Abbasabad عباس آباد
- Village
- Location within Iran
- Coordinates: 29°13′21″N 54°16′46″E
- Country: Iran
- Province: Fars
- County: Neyriz
- Bakhsh: Central
- Rural District: Rostaq

Population (2016)
  - Total: 186
- Time zone: UTC+3:30 (IRST)

Abbasabad (Persian: عباس آباد, also Romanized as 'Abbāsābād) is a village in Rostaq Rural District, in the Central District of Neyriz County, Fars province, Iran. At the 2006 census, its population was 236, in 53 families. In 2016, it had 186 people in 58 households.
