= Abbasabad, Rigan =

Abbasabad عباس اباد
- Village
- Location within Iran
- Coordinates: 28°38′29″N 59°08′45″E
- Country: Iran
- Province: Kerman
- County: Rigan
- Bakhsh: Central
- Rural District: Rigan

Population (2006)
  - Total: 136
- Time zone: UTC+3:30 (IRST)
  - Summer (DST): UTC+4:30 (IRDT)

Abbasabad (Persian: عباس اباد, also Romanized as ‘Abbāsābād; also known as ‘Abbāsābād-e Shahakī) is a village in Rigan Rural District, in the Central District of Rigan County, Kerman Province, Iran. At the 2006 census, its population was 136, in 22 families.
