= Abbasabad, Nehbandan =

Abbasabad عباس اباد
- Village
- Interactive map of Abbasabad
- Coordinates: 31.542°N 60.037°E
- Country: Iran
- Province: South Khorasan
- County: Nehbandan
- Bakhsh: Shusef
- Rural District: Shusef

Population (2006)
  - Total: 43
- Time zone: UTC+3:30 (IRST)
  - Summer (DST): UTC+4:30 (IRDT)

Abbasabad (Persian: عباس اباد, also Romanized as ‘Abbāsābād) is a village in Shusef Rural District, Shusef District, Nehbandan County, South Khorasan province, Iran. At the 2006 census, its population was 43, in 10 families.
