= Abbasabad-e Bahrami =

Abbasabad-e Bahrami عباس ابادبهرامي
- Village
- Location within Iran
- Coordinates: 28°42′14″N 58°51′58″E
- Country: Iran
- Province: Kerman
- County: Rigan
- Bakhsh: Central
- Rural District: Rigan

Population (2006)
  - Total: 648
- Time zone: UTC+3:30 (IRST)
  - Summer (DST): UTC+4:30 (IRDT)

Abbasabad-e Bahrami (Persian: عباس ابادبهرامي, also Romanized as Abbāsābād-e Bahrāmī; also known as ‘Abbāsābād) is a village in Rigan Rural District, in the Central District of Rigan County, Kerman Province, Iran. At the 2006 census, its population was 648, in 157 families.
