= Abbasabad-e Olya =

Village in Zanjan province, Iran

Abbasabad-e Olya Persian: عباس ابادعليا
- Village
- Location within Iran
- Coordinates: 36°04′56″N 48°58′37″E
- Country: Iran
- Province: Zanjan
- County: Abhar
- District: Central
- Rural District: Abharrud

Population (2016)
  - Total: 18
- Time zone: UTC+3:30 (IRST)

Abbasabad-e Olya (Persian: عباس ابادعليا) (Note: Also romanized as ‘Abbāsābād-e ‘Olyā; also known as ‘Abbāsābād and ‘Abbāsābād-e Bālā) is a village in Abharrud Rural District of the Central District in Abhar County, Zanjan province, Iran.

== Demographics ==
=== Population ===
At the time of the 2006 National Census, the village's population was 89 in 15 households. The following census in 2011 counted 42 people in 10 households. The 2016 census measured the population of the village as 18 people in seven households.
