= Abbasabad, Kamyaran =

Abbasabad عباس آباد
- Village
- Location within Iran
- Coordinates: 35°00′17″N 46°58′21″E
- Country: Iran
- Province: Kurdistan
- County: Kamyaran
- Bakhsh: Muchesh
- Rural District: Avalan

Population (2006)
  - Total: 122
- Time zone: UTC+3:30 (IRST)
  - Summer (DST): UTC+4:30 (IRDT)

Abbasabad (Persian: عباس آباد, also romanized as ‘Abbāsābād; also known as Havvāsābād and Hiwāsābād) is a village in Avalan Rural District, Muchesh District, Kamyaran County, Kurdistan Province, Iran. At the 2006 census, its population was 122, in 34 families. The village is populated by Kurds.
