= Kelkel-e Abbasabad =

Kelkel-e Abbasabad كل كل عباس اباد
- Village
- Location within Iran
- Coordinates: 30°48′41″N 51°25′40″E
- Country: Iran
- Province: Kohgiluyeh and Boyer-Ahmad
- County: Dana
- Bakhsh: Central
- Rural District: Dana

Population (2006)
  - Total: 602
- Time zone: UTC+3:30 (IRST)
  - Summer (DST): UTC+4:30 (IRDT)

Kelkel-e Abbasabad (Persian: كل كل عباس اباد, also Romanized as Kelkel-e ‘Abbāsābād; also known as ‘Abbāsābād and Golgol ‘Abbāsābād) is a village in Dana Rural District, in the Central District of Dana County, Kohgiluyeh and Boyer-Ahmad Province, Iran. At the 2006 census, its population was 602, in 145 families.
