= Abbasabad, Behi Dehbokri =

Abbasabad عباس اباد
- Village
- Location within Iran
- Coordinates: 36°39′01″N 46°26′28″E
- Country: Iran
- Province: West Azerbaijan
- County: Bukan
- Bakhsh: Simmineh
- Rural District: Behi Dehbokri

Population (2006)
  - Total: 81
- Time zone: UTC+3:30 (IRST)
  - Summer (DST): UTC+4:30 (IRDT)

Abbasabad (Persian: عباس اباد, also romanized as ‘Abbāsābād; also known as ‘Abbāsābād-e Behī) is a village in Behi Dehbokri Rural District, Simmineh District, Bukan County, West Azerbaijan Province, Iran. At the 2006 census, its population was 81, in 16 families.
