= Abbasabad, Mamasani =

Abbasabad عباس آباد
- Village
- Location within Iran
- Coordinates: 29°56′41″N 51°30′41″E
- Country: Iran
- Province: Fars
- County: Mamasani
- Bakhsh: Central
- Rural District: Bakesh-e Yek

Population (2016)
  - Total: 105
- Time zone: UTC+3:30 (IRST)

Abbasabad (Persian: عباس آباد, also Romanized as 'Abbāsābād; also known as 'Abbāsābād-e Qūrī) is a village in Bakesh-e Yek Rural District, in the Central District of Mamasani County, Fars province, Iran. At the 2016 census, its population was 105, in 32 families. Down from 132 people in 2006.
