= Abbasabad-e Pamzar =

Abbasabad-e Pamzar عباس ابادپامزار
- Village
- Location within Iran
- Coordinates: 30°01′32″N 56°03′46″E
- Country: Iran
- Province: Kerman
- County: Bardsir
- Bakhsh: Central
- Rural District: Kuh Panj

Population (2006)
  - Total: 36
- Time zone: UTC+3:30 (IRST)
  - Summer (DST): UTC+4:30 (IRDT)

Abbasabad-e Pamzar (Persian: عباس ابادپامزار, also Romanized as ‘Abbāsābād-e Pāmzār; also known as ‘Abbāsābād and Khātūnābād) is a village located in Kuh Panj Rural District, in the Central District of Bardsir County, Kerman Province, Iran. At the 2006 census, its population was 36, in 9 families.
