= Qeshlaq-e Abbasabad =

Qeshlaq-e Abbasabad قشلاق عباس اباد
- Village
- Location within Iran
- Coordinates: 34°23′16″N 49°06′10″E
- Country: Iran
- Province: Markazi
- County: Khondab
- Bakhsh: Central
- Rural District: Khondab

Population (2006)
  - Total: 86
- Time zone: UTC+3:30 (IRST)
  - Summer (DST): UTC+4:30 (IRDT)

Qeshlaq-e Abbasabad (Persian: قشلاق عباس اباد, also Romanized as Qeshlāq-e ‘Abbāsābād; also known as ‘Abbāsābād and ‘Abbāsābād-e Chīcheklū) is a village in Khondab Rural District, in the Central District of Khondab County, Markazi Province, Iran. At the 2006 census, its population was 86, in 22 families.
