= Lachabad, Rudbar-e Jonubi =

Lachabad لچ اباد
- Village
- Location within Iran
- Coordinates: 28°07′19″N 58°02′41″E
- Country: Iran
- Province: Kerman
- County: Rudbar-e Jonubi
- Bakhsh: Central
- Rural District: Rudbar

Population (2006)
  - Total: 165
- Time zone: UTC+3:30 (IRST)
  - Summer (DST): UTC+4:30 (IRDT)

Lachabad (Persian: لچ اباد, also Romanized as Lachābād; also known as Kajābād and Lachlachābād) is a village in Rudbar Rural District, in the Central District of Rudbar-e Jonubi County, Kerman Province, Iran. At the 2006 census, its population was 165, in 39 families.
