= Abbasabad, Gotvand =

Abbasabad عباس اباد
- Village
- Location within Iran
- Coordinates: 32°25′00″N 48°53′59″E
- Country: Iran
- Province: Khuzestan
- County: Gotvand
- Bakhsh: Central
- Rural District: Kiyaras

Population (2006)
  - Total: 103
- Time zone: UTC+3:30 (IRST)
  - Summer (DST): UTC+4:30 (IRDT)

Abbasabad (Persian: عباس اباد, also Romanized as ‘Abbāsābād) is a village in Kiyaras Rural District, in the Central District of Gotvand County, Khuzestan Province, Iran. At the 2006 census, its population was 103, in 16 families.
