= Abbasabad-e Ghafur =

Abbasabad-e Ghafur عباس آباد غفور
- Village
- Location within Iran
- Coordinates: 30°29′37″N 56°00′30″E
- Country: Iran
- Province: Kerman
- County: Rafsanjan
- Bakhsh: Central
- Rural District: Azadegan

Population (2006)
  - Total: 1,495
- Time zone: UTC+3:30 (IRST)
  - Summer (DST): UTC+4:30 (IRDT)

Abbasabad-e Ghafur (Persian: عباس آباد غفور, also Romanized as ‘Abbāsābād-e Ghafūr; also known as ‘Abbāsābād) is a village in Azadegan Rural District, in the Central District of Rafsanjan County, Kerman Province, Iran. At the 2006 census, its population was 1,495, in 337 families.
