= Abbasabad, Ardestan =

Abbasabad عباس اباد
- Village
- Location within Iran
- Coordinates: 33°12′13″N 52°05′57″E
- Country: Iran
- Province: Isfahan
- County: Ardestan
- Bakhsh: Central
- Rural District: Olya

Population (2006)
  - Total: 112
- Time zone: UTC+3:30 (IRST)
  - Summer (DST): UTC+4:30 (IRDT)

Abbasabad (Persian: عباس اباد, also Romanized as ‘Abbāsābād; also known as ‘Abbāsābād-e Peghar and ‘Abbāsābād-e Pegharī) is a village in Olya Rural District, in the Central District of Ardestan County, Isfahan Province, Iran. At the 2006 census, its population was 112, in 35 families.
