= Abbasabad, Qaen =

Abbasabad عباس اباد
- Village
- Location within Iran
- Coordinates: 33°36′27″N 59°21′06″E
- Country: Iran
- Province: South Khorasan
- County: Qaen
- Bakhsh: Central
- Rural District: Qaen

Population (2006)
  - Total: 19
- Time zone: UTC+3:30 (IRST)
  - Summer (DST): UTC+4:30 (IRDT)

Abbasabad (Persian: عباس اباد, also Romanized as ‘Abbāsābād; also known as Shūrābād) is a village in Qaen Rural District, in the Central District of Qaen County, South Khorasan Province, Iran. At the 2006 census, its population was 19, in 5 families.
