= Abbasabad-e Hajji =

Abbasabad-e Hajji عباس ابادحاجي
- Village
- Location within Iran
- Coordinates: 30°26′14″N 56°02′08″E
- Country: Iran
- Province: Kerman
- County: Rafsanjan
- Bakhsh: Central
- Rural District: Qasemabad

Population (2006)
  - Total: 2,086
- Time zone: UTC+3:30 (IRST)
  - Summer (DST): UTC+4:30 (IRDT)

Abbasabad-e Hajji (Persian: عباس ابادحاجي, also Romanized as ‘Abbāsābād-e Ḩājjī; also known as ‘Abbāsābād and ‘Abbāsābād-e Ḩājjī Āqā‘alī) is a village in Qasemabad Rural District, in the Central District of Rafsanjan County, Kerman Province, Iran. At the 2006 census, its population was 2,086, in 516 families.
