= Abbasabad, Ardal =

Abbasabad عباس‌آباد
- Village
- Location within Iran
- Coordinates: 32°02′57″N 50°25′57″E
- Country: Iran
- Province: Chaharmahal and Bakhtiari
- County: Ardal
- Bakhsh: Central
- Rural District: Dinaran

Population (2006)
  - Total: 164
- Time zone: UTC+3:30 (IRST)
  - Summer (DST): UTC+4:30 (IRDT)

Abbasabad (Persian: عباس‌آباد, also Romanized as ‘Abbāsābād) is a village in Dinaran Rural District, in the Central District of Ardal County, Chaharmahal and Bakhtiari Province, Iran. At the 2006 census, its population was 164, in 27 families. The village is populated by Lurs.
