= Abbasabad-e Gazak =

Abbasabad-e Gazak گزگ عباس آباد
- Village
- Location within Iran
- Coordinates: 29°24′47″N 52°38′36″E
- Country: Iran
- Province: Fars
- County: Shiraz
- Bakhsh: Central
- Rural District: Bid Zard

Population (2016)
  - Total: 22
- Time zone: UTC+3:30 (IRST)

Abbasabad-e Gazak (Persian: عباس آباد گزک, also Romanized as 'Abbāsābād-e Gazak and Gazag-e Abbāsābād) is a village in Bid Zard Rural District, in the Central District of Shiraz County, Fars province, Iran. At the 2006 census, its population was 22, in 6 families. Decreased from 44 people in 2006.
