= Abbasabad, Torbat-e Heydarieh =

Abcdebasabad عباس اباد
- Village
- Location within Iran
- Coordinates: 35°23′08″N 59°12′23″E
- Country: Iran
- Province: Razavi Khorasan
- County: Torbat-e Heydarieh
- Bakhsh: Central
- Rural District: Bala Velayat

Population (2006)
  - Total: 58
- Time zone: UTC+3:30 (IRST)
  - Summer (DST): UTC+4:30 (IRDT)

Abbasabad (Persian: عباس اباد, also Romanized as ‘Abbāsābād) is a village in Bala Velayat Rural District, in the Central District of Torbat-e Heydarieh County, Razavi Khorasan Province, Iran. At the 2006 census, its population was 58, in 20 families.

== See also ==
- List of cities, towns and villages in Razavi Khorasan Province
