= Abbasabad-e Moin =

Abbasabad-e Moin عباس ابادمعين
- Village
- Location within Iran
- Coordinates: 30°24′54″N 55°49′02″E
- Country: Iran
- Province: Kerman
- County: Rafsanjan
- Bakhsh: Central
- Rural District: Eslamiyeh

Population (2006)
  - Total: 26
- Time zone: UTC+3:30 (IRST)
  - Summer (DST): UTC+4:30 (IRDT)

Abbasabad-e Moin (Persian: عباس ابادمعين, also Romanized as ‘Abbāsābād-e Mo‘īn; also known as ‘Abbāsābād, ‘Abbāsābād-e Khān, and Asadābād) is a village in Eslamiyeh Rural District, in the Central District of Rafsanjan County, Kerman Province, Iran. At the 2006 census, its population was 26, in 6 families.
