= Abbasabad-e Seh Choqa =

Abbasabad-e Seh Choqa عباس ابادسه چقا
- Village
- Location within Iran
- Coordinates: 34°23′45″N 46°40′04″E
- Country: Iran
- Province: Kermanshah
- County: Kermanshah
- Bakhsh: Mahidasht
- Rural District: Chaqa Narges

Population (2006)
  - Total: 155
- Time zone: UTC+3:30 (IRST)
  - Summer (DST): UTC+4:30 (IRDT)

Abbasabad-e Seh Choqa (Persian: عباس ابادسه چقا, also Romanized as ‘Abbāsābād-e Seh Choqā) is a village in Chaqa Narges Rural District, Mahidasht District, Kermanshah County, Kermanshah Province, Iran. At the 2006 census, its population was 155, in 39 families.
