= Abbasabad Molla Reza =

Abbasabad Molla Reza عباس آباد ملارضا
- Village
- Location within Iran
- Coordinates: 27°51′07″N 58°01′39″E
- Country: Iran
- Province: Kerman
- County: Rudbar-e Jonubi
- Bakhsh: Central
- Rural District: Nehzatabad

Population (2006)
  - Total: 1,074
- Time zone: UTC+3:30 (IRST)
  - Summer (DST): UTC+4:30 (IRDT)

Abbasabad Molla Reza (Persian: عباس آباد ملارضا, also Romanized as ‘Abbāsābād Mollā Reẕā; also known as ‘Abbāsābād) is a village in Nehzatabad Rural District, in the Central District of Rudbar-e Jonubi County, Kerman Province, Iran. At the 2006 census, its population was 1,074, in 217 families.
