= Aduri, Arzuiyeh =

Aduri ادوري
- Village
- Location within Iran
- Coordinates: 28°17′18″N 56°34′14″E
- Country: Iran
- Province: Kerman
- County: Arzuiyeh
- Bakhsh: Central
- Rural District: Arzuiyeh

Population (2006)
  - Total: 98
- Time zone: UTC+3:30 (IRST)
  - Summer (DST): UTC+4:30 (IRDT)

Aduri (Persian: ادوري, also romanized as Ādūrī) is a village in Arzuiyeh Rural District, in the Central District of Arzuiyeh County, Kerman Province, Iran. At the 2006 census, its population was 98, in 21 families.
