= Abbasabad, Khorrambid =

Abbasabad عباس اباد
- Village
- Location within Iran
- Coordinates: 30°25′08″N 53°20′54″E
- Country: Iran
- Province: Fars
- County: Khorrambid
- Bakhsh: Mashhad-e Morghab
- Rural District: Shahidabad

Population (2016)
  - Total: 49
- Time zone: UTC+3:30 (IRST)

Abbasabad (Persian: عباس اباد, also Romanized as 'Abbāsābād) is a village in Shahidabad Rural District, Mashhad-e Morghab District, Khorrambid County, Fars province, Iran. At the 2016 census, its population was 49, in 18 families. Increased from 27 people in 2006.
