= Abbasabad-e Seyf =

Abbasabad-e Seyf عباس ابادسيف
- Village
- Location within Iran
- Coordinates: 35°33′53″N 50°02′48″E
- Country: Iran
- Province: Qazvin
- County: Buin Zahra
- Bakhsh: Central
- Rural District: Zahray-ye Pain

Population (2006)
  - Total: 51
- Time zone: UTC+3:30 (IRST)
  - Summer (DST): UTC+4:30 (IRDT)

Abbasabad-e Seyf (Persian: عباس ابادسيف, also Romanized as ‘Abbāsābād-e Seyf) is a village in Zahray-ye Pain Rural District, in the Central District of Buin Zahra County, Qazvin Province, Iran. At the 2006 census, its population was 51, in 6 families.
