= Abbasabad, Chenaran =

Abbasabad عباس اباد
- Village
- Location within Iran
- Coordinates: 36°42′52″N 59°09′59″E
- Country: Iran
- Province: Razavi Khorasan
- County: Chenaran
- Bakhsh: Central
- Rural District: Chenaran

Population (2006)
  - Total: 26
- Time zone: UTC+3:30 (IRST)

Abbasabad (Persian: عباس اباد, also Romanized as ‘Abbāsābād) is a village in Chenaran Rural District, in the Central District of Chenaran County, Razavi Khorasan Province, Iran. At the 2006 census, its population was 26, in 9 families.

== See also ==
- List of cities, towns and villages in Razavi Khorasan Province
