= Abbasabad, Shiraz =

Abbasabad عباس آباد
- Village
- Location within Iran
- Coordinates: 29°14′23″N 52°21′55″E
- Country: Iran
- Province: Fars
- County: Shiraz
- Bakhsh: Central
- Rural District: Siyakh Darengun

Population (2016)
  - Total: 336
- Time zone: UTC+3:30 (IRST)

Abbasabad (Persian: عباس آباد, also Romanized as 'Abbāsābād) is a village in Siyakh Darengun Rural District, in the Central District of Shiraz County, Fars province, Iran. At the 2016 census, its population was 336, in 99 families. Up from 255 people in 2006.
