= Abbasabad, Yusefvand =

Abbasabad عباس اباد
- Village
- Location within Iran
- Coordinates: 33°53′14″N 48°13′08″E
- Country: Iran
- Province: Lorestan
- County: Selseleh
- Bakhsh: Central
- Rural District: Yusefvand

Population (2006)
  - Total: 69
- Time zone: UTC+3:30 (IRST)
  - Summer (DST): UTC+4:30 (IRDT)

Abbasabad (Persian: عباس اباد, also Romanized as ‘Abbāsābād) is a village in Yusefvand Rural District, in the Central District of Selseleh County, Lorestan Province, Iran.

== Demographics ==
At the 2006 census, its population was 69, in 16 families.
