= Abbasabad, Howmeh =

Abbasabad عباس آباد
- Village
- Location within Iran
- Coordinates: 36°07′24″N 54°24′50″E
- Country: Iran
- Province: Semnan
- County: Damghan
- Bakhsh: Central
- Rural District: Howmeh

Population (2006)
  - Total: 31
- Time zone: UTC+3:30 (IRST)
  - Summer (DST): UTC+4:30 (IRDT)

Abbasabad (Persian: عباس آباد, also Romanized as ‘Abbāsābād) is a village in Howmeh Rural District, in the Central District of Damghan County, Semnan Province, Iran. At the 2006 census, its population was 31, in 11 families.
