= Abbasabad-e Gol Shaygan =

Abbasabad-e Gol Shaygan عباس ابادگل شايگان
- Village
- Location within Iran
- Coordinates: 35°34′48″N 50°45′00″E
- Country: Iran
- Province: Tehran
- County: Malard
- Bakhsh: Central
- Rural District: Akhtarabad

Population (2006)
  - Total: 22
- Time zone: UTC+3:30 (IRST)
  - Summer (DST): UTC+4:30 (IRDT)

Abbasabad-e Gol Shaygan (Persian: عباس ابادگل شايگان, also Romanized as ‘Abbāsābād-e Gol Shāygān and ‘Abbāsābād-e Gol Shāyān; also known as ‘Abbāsābād-e Golshār) is a village in Akhtarabad Rural District, in the Central District of Malard County, Tehran Province, Iran. At the 2006 census, its population was 22, in 5 families.
