= Abbasabad Complex Taybad =

Iranian national heritage site

Abbasabad Complex
- مجموعه عباس‌آباد
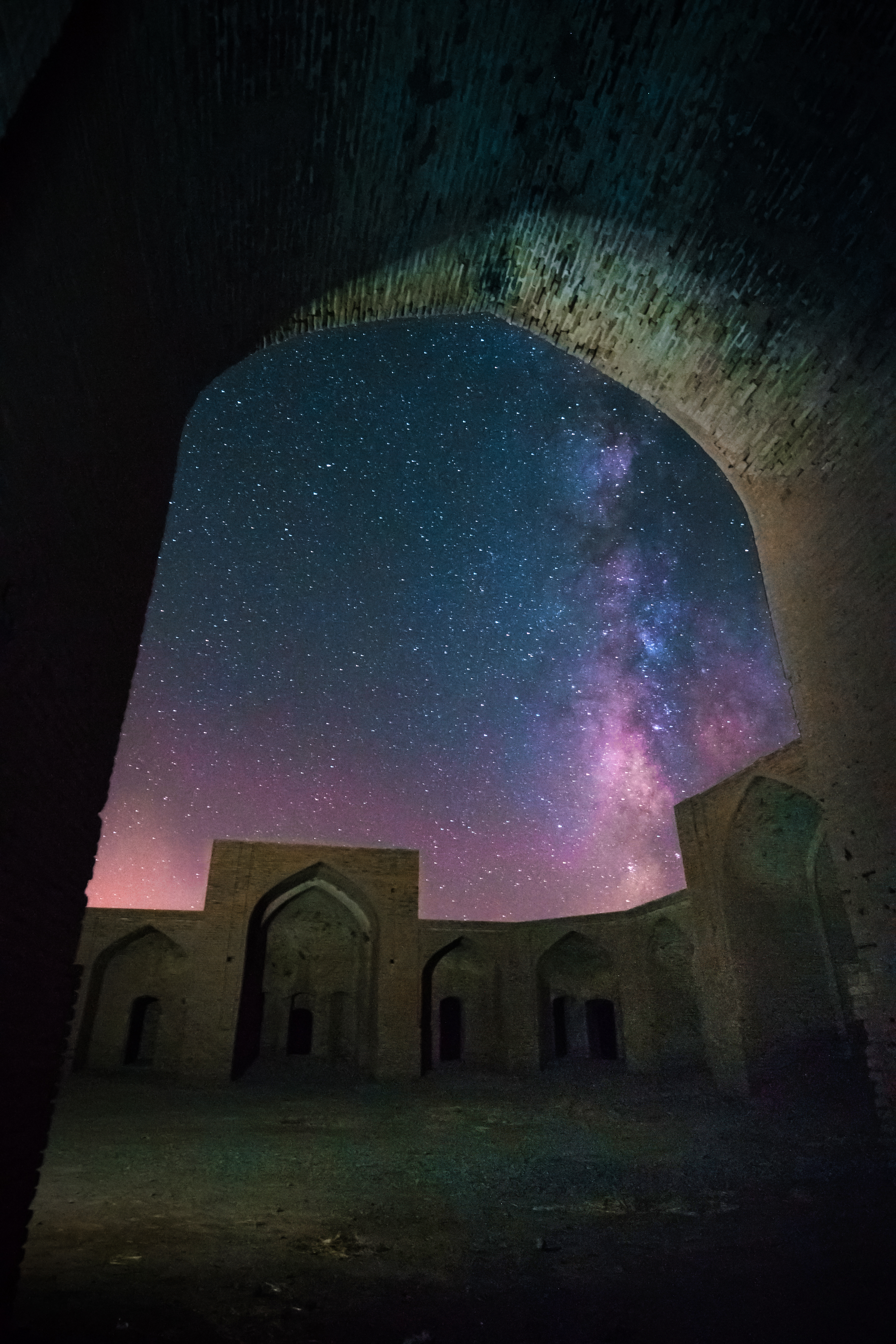
- Abbasabad Complex

- Location within Iran
- Established: Qajar dynasty
- Location: Taybad, Iran
- Coordinates: 34°59′45″N 60°43′09″E
- Type: Historical Complex
- Owner: Cultural Heritage, Handicrafts and Tourism Organization of Iran

Abbasabad Complex (Persian: مجموعه عباس‌آباد) is related to the Timurid and the Qajar. This complex is located 34 kilometers north of Taybad.

== Gallery ==
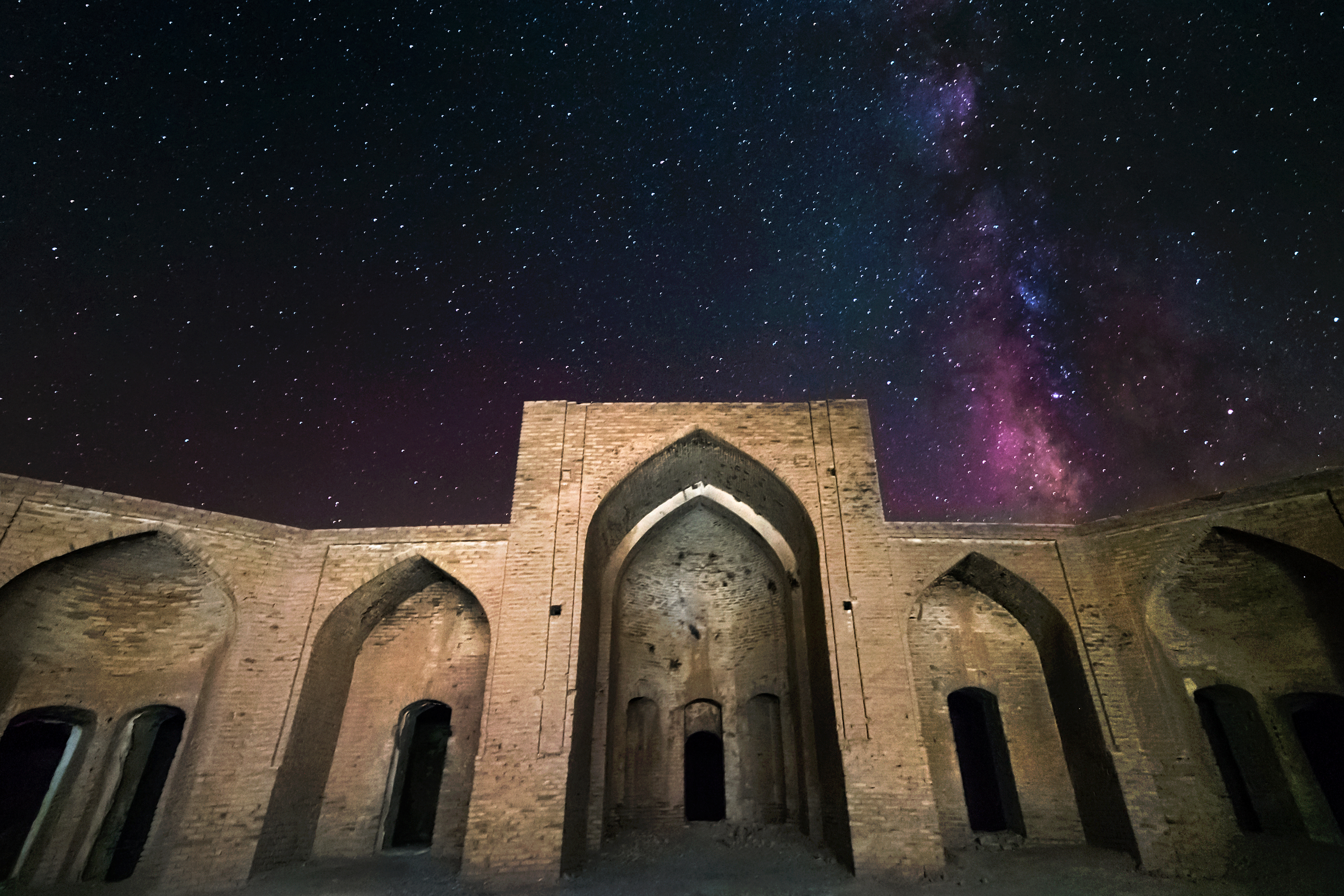

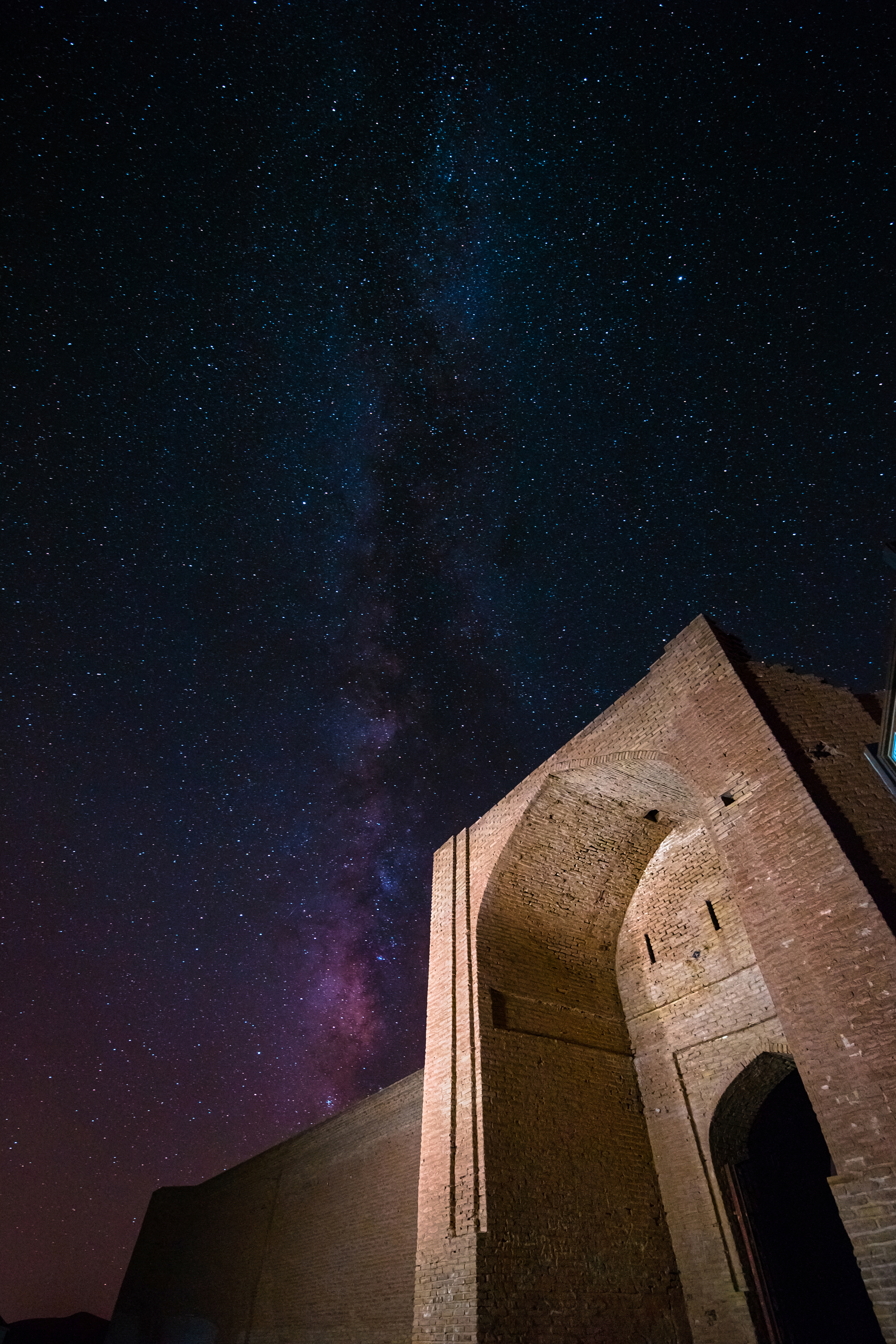

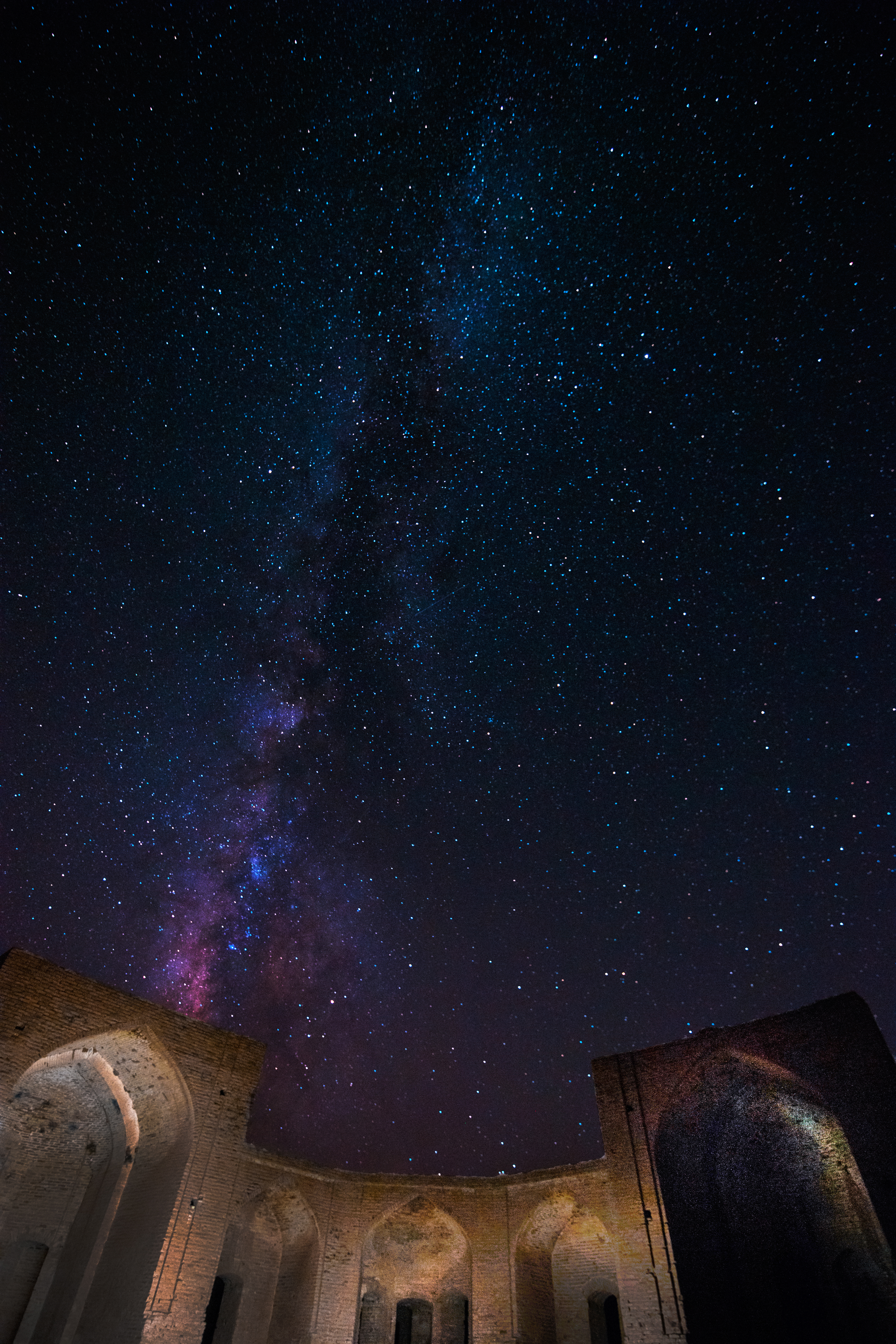
