= Abbasabad, Urmia =

Abbasabad عباس اباد
- Village
- Location within Iran
- Coordinates: 37°41′36″N 45°03′15″E
- Country: Iran
- Province: West Azerbaijan
- County: Urmia
- Bakhsh: Central
- Rural District: Nazluy-ye Jonubi

Population (2006)
  - Total: 60
- Time zone: UTC+3:30 (IRST)
  - Summer (DST): UTC+4:30 (IRDT)
- Climate: Csa

Abbasabad (Persian: عباس اباد, also Romanized as ‘Abbāsābād; also known as Dastjerd-e ‘Abbāsābād) is a village in Nazluy-ye Jonubi Rural District, in the Central District of Urmia County, West Azerbaijan Province, Iran. At the 2006 census, its population was 60, in 19 families.
