= Qaleh-ye Abbasabad, Shazand =

Village in Markazi province, Iran

Qaleh-ye Abbasabad Persian: قلعه عباس اباد
- Village
- Location within Iran
- Coordinates: 33°52′52″N 49°22′10″E
- Country: Iran
- Province: Markazi
- County: Shazand
- District: Central
- Rural District: Astaneh

Population (2016)
  - Total: 524
- Time zone: UTC+3:30 (IRST)

Qaleh-ye Abbasabad (Persian: قلعه عباس اباد) (Note: Also romanized as Qal‘eh-ye ‘Abbāsābād; also known as ‘Abbāsābād) is a village in Astaneh Rural District of the Central District in Shazand County, (Note: Formerly Sarband County) Markazi province, Iran.

== Demographics ==
=== Population ===
At the time of the 2006 National Census, the village's population was 677 in 183 households. The following census in 2011 counted 637 people in 206 households. At the 2016 census, the village population was 524 people in 190 households.
