= Qaleh-ye Abbasabad, Khondab =

Village in Markazi province, Iran

Qaleh-ye Abbasabad Persian: قلعه عباس اباد
- Village
- Location within Iran
- Coordinates: 34°17′13″N 49°14′24″E
- Country: Iran
- Province: Markazi
- County: Khondab
- District: Qareh Chay
- Rural District: Sang Sefid

Population (2016)
  - Total: 190
- Time zone: UTC+3:30 (IRST)

Qaleh-ye Abbasabad (Persian: قلعه عباس اباد) (Note: Also romanized as Qal‘eh-ye ‘Abbāsābād; also known as ‘Abbasābād and ‘Abbāsābād) is a village in Sang Sefid Rural District of Qareh Chay District in Khondab County, Markazi province, Iran.

== Demographics ==
=== Population ===
At the time of the 2006 National Census, the village's population was 274 in 57 households, when it was in the former Khondab District of Arak County. The following census in 2011 counted 208 people in 50 households, by which time the district had been separated from the county in the establishment of Khondab County. The rural district was transferred to the new Qareh Chay District. The 2016 census measured the population of the village as 190 people in 56 households.
