= Abbasabad, Azerbaijan =

Abbasabad عباس‌آباد
- Municipality
- Location within Azerbaijan
- Coordinates: 38°52′08″N 48°17′16″E
- Country: Azerbaijan
- Rayon: Yardimli

Population
  - Total: 596
- Time zone: UTC+4 (AZT)

Abbasabad (also Abas-Abad; Persian: عباس‌آباد) is a village and municipality in the Yardimli District of Azerbaijan. It has a population of 596. The municipality consists of the villages of Abbasabad and Solqard.
