= Hur District =

District in Kerman province, Iran

Hur District Persian: بخش هور
- District
- Location within Iran
- Coordinates: 28°18′38″N 57°10′58″E
- Country: Iran
- Province: Kerman
- County: Faryab
- Capital: Hur-e Pasefid

Population (2016)
  - Total: 17,048
- Time zone: UTC+3:30 (IRST)

Hur District (Persian: بخش هور) is in Faryab County, Kerman province, Iran. Its capital is the city of Hur-e Pasefid.

== History ==
After the 2006 National Census, Faryab District was separated from Kahnuj County in the establishment of Faryab County, which was divided into two districts of two rural districts each, with Faryab as its capital and only city at the time. After the 2016 census, the village of Hur-e Pasefid was elevated to the status of a city.

== Demographics ==
=== Population ===
At the time of the 2011 census, the district's population was 15,468 people in 3,931 households. The 2016 census measured the population of the district as 17,048 inhabitants in 4,873 households.

Hur District Population
Administrative Divisions	2011	2016
Hur RD	11,964	13,062
Zahmakan RD	3,504	3,986
Hur-e Pasefid (city) (Note: Became a city after the 2016 census)		
Total	15,468	17,048
RD = Rural District
