= Mehruiyeh Rural District =

Rural district in Kerman province, Iran

Mehruiyeh Rural District Persian: دهستان مهروئيه
- Rural District
- Location within Iran
- Coordinates: 28°08′N 57°30′E
- Country: Iran
- Province: Kerman
- County: Faryab
- District: Central
- Capital: Mehruiyeh-ye Pain

Population (2016)
  - Total: 6,884
- Time zone: UTC+3:30 (IRST)

Mehruiyeh Rural District (Persian: دهستان مهروئيه) is in the Central District of Faryab County, Kerman province, Iran. Its capital is the village of Mehruiyeh-ye Pain.

== Demographics ==
=== Population ===
At the time of the 2006 National Census, the rural district's population (as a part of the former Faryab District of Kahnuj County) was 6,824 in 1,381 households. There were 7,411 inhabitants in 1,837 households at the following census of 2011, by which time the district had been separated from the county in the establishment of Faryab County. The rural district was transferred to the new Central District. The 2016 census measured the population of the rural district as 6,884 in 1,958 households. The most populous of its 29 villages was Mehruiyeh-ye Pain, with 727 people.
