= Faryab District =

Former district in Kerman province, Iran

Faryab District Persian: بخش فاریاب
- Former District
- Location within Iran
- Coordinates: 28°12′N 57°20′E
- Country: Iran
- Province: Kerman
- County: Kahnuj
- Capital: Faryab

Population (2006)
  - Total: 31,605
- Time zone: UTC+3:30 (IRST)

Faryab District (Persian: بخش فاریاب) is a former administrative division of Kahnuj County, Kerman province, Iran. Its capital was the city of Faryab.

== History ==
After the 2006 National Census, the district was separated from the county in the establishment of Faryab County.

== Demographics ==
=== Population ===
At the time of the 2006 census, the district's population was 31,605 in 6,751 households.

=== Administrative divisions ===
Faryab District Population
Administrative Divisions	2006
Golashkerd RD	5,353
Hur RD	14,920
Mehruiyeh RD	6,824
Faryab (city)	4,508
Total	31,605
RD = Rural District
