= Hur Rural District =

Rural district in Kerman province, Iran

Hur Rural District Persian: دهستان حور
- Rural District
- Location within Iran
- Coordinates: 28°16′25″N 57°19′15″E
- Country: Iran
- Province: Kerman
- County: Faryab
- District: Hur
- Capital: Hur-e Pasefid

Population (2016)
  - Total: 13,062
- Time zone: UTC+3:30 (IRST)

Hur Rural District (Persian: دهستان حور) is in Hur District of Faryab County, Kerman province, Iran. It is administered from the city of Hur-e Pasefid.

== Demographics ==
=== Population ===
At the time of the 2006 National Census, the rural district's population (as a part of the former Faryab District of Kahnuj County) was 14,920 in 3,256 households. There were 11,964 inhabitants in 2,968 households at the following census of 2011, by which time the district had been separated from the county in the establishment of Faryab County. The rural district was transferred to the new Hur District. The 2016 census measured the population of the rural district as 13,062 in 3,644 households. The most populous of its 47 villages was Eslamabad-e Chah Narenj, with 1,577 people.
