= Golashkerd Rural District =

Rural district in Kerman province, Iran

Golashkerd Rural District Persian: دهستان كلاشگرد
- Rural District
- Location within Iran
- Coordinates: 28°01′03″N 57°12′25″E
- Country: Iran
- Province: Kerman
- County: Faryab
- District: Central
- Capital: Faryab

Population (2016)
  - Total: 5,205
- Time zone: UTC+3:30 (IRST)

Golashkerd Rural District (Persian: دهستان كلاشگرد) is in the Central District of Faryab County, Kerman province, Iran. It is administered from the city of Faryab.

== Demographics ==
=== Population ===
At the time of the 2006 National Census, the rural district's population was (as a part of the former Faryab District of Kahnuj County) was 5,353 in 1,143 households. There were 5,513 inhabitants in 1,424 households at the following census of 2011, by which time the district had been separated from the county in the establishment of Faryab County. The rural district was transferred to the new Central District. The 2016 census measured the population of the rural district as 5,205 in 1,643 households. The most populous of its 87 villages was Mazraeh-ye Emam, with 661 people.
