= Central District (Faryab County) =

District in Kerman province, Iran

Central District (Faryab County) Persian: بخش مرکزی شهرستان فاریاب
- District
- Location within Iran
- Coordinates: 28°01′58″N 57°21′30″E
- Country: Iran
- Province: Kerman
- County: Faryab
- Capital: Faryab

Population (2016)
  - Total: 16,952
- Time zone: UTC+3:30 (IRST)

The Central District of Faryab County (Persian: بخش مرکزی شهرستان فاریاب) is in Kerman province, Iran. Its capital is the city of Faryab.

== History ==
After the 2006 National Census, Faryab District was separated from Kahnuj County in the establishment of Faryab County, which was divided into two districts of two rural districts each, with Faryab as its capital and only city at the time.

== Demographics ==
=== Population ===
At the time of the 2011 census, the district's population was 18,949 people in 4,630 households. The 2016 census measured the population of the district as 16,952 inhabitants in 4,944 households.

=== Administrative divisions ===
Central District (Faryab County) Population
Administrative Divisions	2011	2016
Golashkerd RD	5,513	5,205
Mehruiyeh RD	7,411	6,884
Faryab (city)	6,025	4,863
Total	18,949	16,952
RD = Rural District
