= Faryab County =

County in Kerman province, Iran

Faryab County Persian: شهرستان فاریاب
- County
- Location of Faryab County in Kerman province (bottom left, purple)

- Location of Kerman province in Iran
- Coordinates: 28°12′N 57°20′E
- Country: Iran
- Province: Kerman
- Capital: Faryab
- Districts: Central, Hur

Population (2016)
  - Total: 34,000
- Time zone: UTC+3:30 (IRST)

Faryab County (Persian: شهرستان فاریاب) is in Kerman province, Iran. Its capital is the city of Faryab.

== History ==
After the 2006 National Census, Faryab District was separated from Kahnuj County in the establishment of Faryab County, which was divided into two districts of two rural districts each, with Faryab as its capital and only city at the time. After the 2016 census, the village of Hur-e Pasefid was elevated to the status of a city.

== Demographics ==
=== Population ===
At the time of the 2011 census, the county's population was 34,417 people in 8,553 households. The 2016 census measured the population of the county as 34,000 in 9,817 households.

=== Administrative divisions ===
Faryab County's population history and administrative structure over two consecutive censuses are shown in the following table.

Faryab County Population
Administrative Divisions	2011	2016
Central District	18,949	16,952
Golashkerd RD	5,513	5,205
Mehruiyeh RD	7,411	6,884
Faryab (city)	6,025	4,863
Hur District	15,468	17,048
Hur RD	11,964	13,062
Zahmakan RD	3,504	3,986
Hur-e Pasefid (city) (Note: Became a city after the 2016 census)		
Total	34,417	34,000
RD = Rural District

== See also ==
Media related to Faryab County at Wikimedia Commons
