= Mastoureh Afshar =

Iranian women's rights activist (1898–1951)

- مستوره افشار
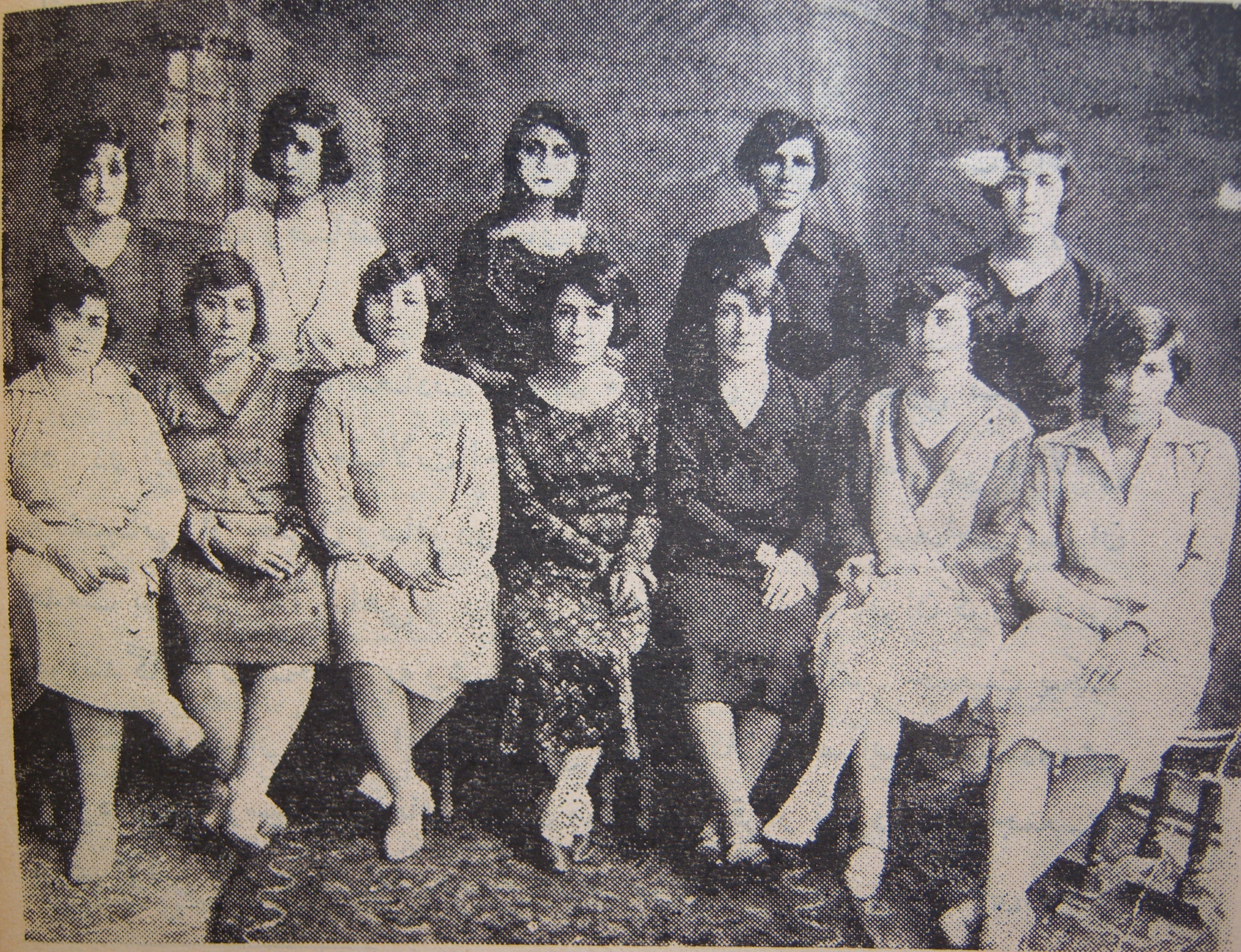
- Mastoureh Afshar (Sitting from left, fourth person) in Jamiat Nesvan Vatankhah
- Born: 1898; Urmia, West Azerbaijan province, Sublime State of Iran
- Died: 1951 (aged 52–53); Tehran, Imperial State of Iran
- Occupations: Feminist and women's rights activist
- Known for: Co-founder of the Patriotic Women's League of Iran

Mastoureh Afshar (Persian: مستوره افشار; 1898–1951) was an Iranian intellectual, feminist, and a pioneering figure in the women's rights movement in Iran. Alongside contemporary feminists Mohtaram Eskandari and Noor-ol-Hoda Mangeneh, she co-founded the radicalist Patriotic Women's League of Iran in Tehran in 1922. She became the society's president in 1925 and held the position until 1932.

== Early life ==
Mastoureh Afshar was born in 1898 in Urmia, West Azerbaijan province. She was the daughter of Majd al-Saltaneh Afshar, an intellectual Iranian nationalist. Afshar was educated in Russia and spoke Persian, Azeri, Turkish and French. She had four siblings; her eldest brother was Jalal Afshar, the father of Iranian entomology. Her sister Turan Afshar was also an entomologist whereas her other two sisters Alca and Heide were active politically as members of the Patriotic Women's League alongside Mastoureh.

In the aftermath of the Persian Constitutional Revolution, multiple women's rights organizations came into existence. Afshar, alongside her contemporaries Sediqeh Dowlatabadi, Mohtaram Eskandari and others, advocated for the creation of girls schools and development of political rights for women. She co-founded the Patriotics Women's League in 1922 which was headed by Mohtaram Eskandari until 1925 after Eskandari died of spinal surgery complications at the age of 29. She assumed the leadership role until 1932. She attended the first conference on Muslim women held in Damascus in 1930, as part of the Iranian delegation alongside Sediqeh Dowlatabadi and Tabatai.

In 1932, she was invited by the Iranian government to organize and open the second Eastern Women's Congress in Tehran from 27 November to 2 December of the same year. The congress was attended by women from 15 countries ranging from Australia and Afghanistan to Zanzibar. The Congress passed a 22-point resolution which promoted women's suffrage, equal opportunities in education and work, the reformation of family law, and prohibition of polygamy and prostitution. However, after the Congress ended, the government took over the Patriotics Women's League and it ceased to exist.

== Death ==
She remained unmarried and died in Tehran in 1951 of breast cancer.

== See also ==
- Women in Iran
- Women's rights movement in Iran
