= Mokhadarat Vatan Association =

Mokhadarat Vatan Association (Persian: انجمن مخدرات وطن) was a feminist society that was formed in 1910 during the Iranian Constitutional Revolution and the national movements happening in the 1900s. The aim of this association was to organize various activities for Iranian independence from the sovereignty of foreign countries. The members of the association were active in the meetings and demonstrations of the constitutional movement. They also wrote protest letters to the Russian Government about their imperialist actions. The association's first board of directors included Agha Bigam Najmabadi as chairman, Agha Shahzadeh Amin as treasurer, and Sediqeh Dowlatabadi as secretary.

== History ==
During the Constitutional Revolution, many secret and semi-congressional associations in Iran were established. Many women's associations were also secretly formed in the constitutional movement. (Later, in the years following the governmental assembly and in World War II, associations were set up that focused on women's rights).

Mokhadarat Vatan Association and similar organizations held massive meetings on the role of women in the 1911 National Movement to banish British Empire and Russia from Iran. They opposed the 1907 treaty, which imposed Iran under the influence of Britain and Russia, incite imports of imported goods, and went to cafes to reduce sugar imports. They even tried to stop them from using foreign sugar, and asked the cafes to shut down in order to reduce consumption.

The members of the Mokhadarat Vatan Association considered exploitation of foreign countries as the main cause of the underlying position of women in Iran at that time. Their main goal was not to only emphasize on women's rights, but also dominate Iran's independence from other countries.

For example, in one of the meetings between women's associations and the Russian delegation, the panel was trying to persuade women that they should not try to protect the independence of Iran since they did not the Persian Constitution of 1906 of women's rights in Iran. But, the response of the women's groups was that they themselves were dissatisfied with their own circumstances, but the main culprit was the political complexity of the presence of foreign powers. This attitude was later seen in women's political activists of the 1979 Revolution.

== Members ==
At the first meeting, the board of directors of this association was elected: Agha Bigam Najmabadi, daughter of Agha Sheikh Hadi Najmabadi as the chairman, Agha Shahzadeh Amin as the treasurer, and Sediqeh Dowlatabadi as the secretary.

Other prominent members that we can refer to were: Mirza Suleiman Khan Mikdah's wife, Dr. Mehdikhan Mikdah's mother, spouse of Malik Al-Mutkelimen (Senator Dr. Malikzadeh's mother), Nehzat Jahangir, Efat Al-Muluk Khaje Noori, Nazam Al-Muluk Khaje Noori, Mr. Sayed Kazem Rashti’s wife, Zinat Aldoleh, Gulshan Al-Muluk Ghahramani, Iran Khanoom (Etela Al-Malek's wife, daughter of Mashhār Al-Saltanah Ghadimi), Mirza Kazem Khoshnevis's wife, Sedigh Al-Saltanah's wife, Sardar Afgham's daughter, Sepahsalar Tonekaboni's daughter, Mofakham Al-Mamalek's wife, Mirza Hassan Roshdieh's wife (Alavieh khanoom), Notagh Al-Nesvan (Sheikh Al Mamalek Orang's sister), Dorat Al Ma'ali (Founder of Dorat School), Homa Mahmoudi, Mahrokh Goharshenas (Sister of the Industrial Director), and Amirsahi Mahsoltan (Women's rights activists).

== See also ==
- Iranian Constitutional Revolution
- Women's Freedom Association
- Women in Constitutional Revolution
- Jam'iyat-e Nesvan-e Vatankhah
- Women's World (Iranian magazine)
- Isfahan National Holy Association
- Kanoun-e-Banovan
