= Women in the Persian Constitutional Revolution =

During the Persian Constitutional Revolution (1905-1911), Iranian women organized protests, raised funds, and even participated in armed resistance. Even though women did not have official political power and rights, Iranian women formed associations, some public and some secret. These organizations led boycotts, demonstrations, and many nationalist campaigns. Iranian women participated in the armed revolution by supporting the army with ammunition and food and disguising themselves as men to fight. The Iranian women who participated in the Constitutional Revolution were motivated by rising nationalist ideals that pushed them to become “patriotic women” who contributed to Iran’s progress.

== Background ==
In the Qajar period, women's attitudes to acceptance were fate and surrender. For example, girls were taught to sit quietly and have little mobility, not to question and had to obey men-even their younger brother. This socialization pattern continued until many periods later, and at that time, no social group could defend its rights and interests.This became more intense for women in terms of the gender segregation that existed at that time. They were faced severe restrictions, such as being deprived in relationship and interaction with the outside world. These conditions they were living under created the context for the first signs of women involvement in the late Qajar period.

During the late Qajar period (1896-1905), women's opportunities for political and public participation were limited, but small groups of women still took part in activities in the lead up to the Constitutional Revolution (1905-1911). Iranian women held small gatherings where they would share political news and support constitutional ideas. Even before 1910, in the last years of the Qajar period, some educated women wrote poetry addressing social and political concerns. In the early twentieth century women expressed dissatisfaction with traditional gender expectations and the restrictions that had been placed on them. Women attended gatherings in mosques to become informed about political events, to share, and discuss. They contributed to the constitutional movement by disseminating the information they learned.Even though the number of women involved was small, their activities, from sharing information to organizing gatherings, represented the first sign of fight for change.

In the early twentieth century, a new vision of womanhood began to develop in Iran. Women wanted roles beyond their domestic work and home lives. Women redefined their identity from "patriotic motherhood" to "patriotic womanhood.” Afsaneh Najmabadi describes this shift as changing women’s contributions to society from raising children, to involvement in education, paid work, and community based activities. Iranian women started to view themselves as more than a homemaker. This change in women’s roles started to open up chances for them to become more active in education and social reform, although the changes were still limited. They saw themselves as contributors to the working aspect of society, through teaching and participating in early women's groups. Women participated in the emerging reform movement by creating many formal associations, such as the Women's Freedom Association, and the Patriotic Women's Society. These organization's were more formal and organized, then the small gatherings mentioned earlier. This shift in how women perceived their roles was the beginning of a transformative period where Iranian women saw themselves as capable agents of change. The development that these women initiated linked their progress, to the modernization of Iran and the shaping of a national identity. The empowerment that these women were going after was connected to the country's pursuit of progress.

== The beginning of the constitution ==
In the early stages of the Constitutional Revolution (late 1891 – early 1901), women were mostly influenced by clerics. But, because of their support for constitutionalism, they managed to emerge from their homes and participated in demonstrations and other behaviors that were considered non-traditional, such as the "rioting of bread". Slowly the movement of women became more tangible and more independent. They set up associations, private courses, and did social awareness activities which made them become more active and grew higher in the world outside their homes.

Some women's associations and organizations organized armed battles for constitution. For example, in the armed struggle between pro-opposition and constitutional opposition in Azerbaijan, 20 women were found dead in men's clothing. In 1911, when it was rumored that some parliamentarians gave up themselves to the demands of the Russians, about 300 women went to the parliament with a pistol to force them to protect the country's freedom and territorial integrity. In Azerbaijan, we can see the Zainab Pasha uprising in 1931. This was when the armed struggle began to rise, many women were secretly involved in men's clothing, and some of them were accidentally known. For example, a soldier who had been injured and was to be treated at the clinic refused any therapy. The refusing reached to the point where Sattar Khan came and asks him, "My son, you should not die. We need your strength, we need your iron will. Why don't you let them cure your wound? And the soldier in whispers in his ear, saying that I am a woman".

Another recorded case illustrates that during one of the fights in Azerbaijan, a group of 20 dead constitutionalists were found and, it became clear that all of them were women.

Women's associations did a lot of non-violent actions in defense of the constitution, as well as forcing Britain and Russia to leave Iran. Also during the establishment of the central bank by the Parliament, they sold jewelries and purchased shares from the government. Modern women were boycotting foreign goods, for example, they tried to persuade cafes to shut down sugar imports.

These associations held massive meetings about the role of women in the 1911 national movement to remove Britain and Russia from Iran. At one of the meetings between the women's associations and the Russian delegation, the panel tried to convince women that, because the Iranian constitution does not observe women's rights in Iran, they should not try to protect it. But the women's groups’ responses were that they are dissatisfied with their own circumstances, and the culprit is the political complexity of the presence of foreign powers.

The women's groups even contacted women activists in England in 1911, asking them to use the British government's political influence to support the Iranians. But, unfortunately, they responded that they have no political privilege in their government and power to support the Iranian people.

== Women and Conquering Tehran in the Constitutional Revolution ==
During the Persian Constitutional Revolution, women collected money, gathered food and supplies, and joined demonstrations and boycotts. These participation efforts were not consistently documented in early historical accounts. Afsaneh Najmabadi describes early historical accounts of the revolution as "histories of men" that overlooked women's involvements and placed the focus instead on men who were active in the political sphere. Alongside clerics, merchants, and tribal leaders, women also engaged in political and social organizing. Women's participation in the military was logistical and supportive in most cases, but Bibi Maryam Bakhtiari was a notable example of a woman who took part directly in fighting.

During the 1909 advance on Tehran, women prepared food and gathered bandages to help supply the fighters. Women sent messages and transported ammunition, moving supplies and materials during the major times of conflict. There are also records that show women were present in the city during parts of the fighting and that women contributed by delivering messages, bringing ammunition, and helping provide supplies needed for the revolution. Commander Bibi Maryam Bakhtiari organized supplies and coordinated the practical support needed for her forces during the campaign against Tehran.

Commander Bibi Maryam Bakhtiari known as the daughter of Hossein Gholi Khan Ilkhani, sister of Ali-Qoli Khan Bakhtiari, Commander Asad, and wife of Zargham Al-Saltanah Bakhtiari, was one of the constitutional revolutionary women, one who participated in the revolutionary and political activities. She was a well-educated and an enlightened woman during that time period, rising to support freedom and taking action. She was also an expert in shooting and horse racing techniques. Since she was the Khan's spouse, she had the opportunity to be in charge of horse riders, and was supported by constitutionalists at urgent times of wars. Commander Bibi Maryam Bakhtiari was one of the main proponents of Ali-Qoli Khan Bakhtiari to conquer Tehran. She wrote in various letters and telegrams between the heads of the tribe and the spectacular speeches of the tribe's leaders to fight the minor tyranny (Mohammad Ali Shah Qajar's tyranny). Bibi Maryam was also known as one of the anti-colonial and authoritarian characters of the Qajar era.

Before the Triumph of Tehran, she secretly entered Tehran with some of the riders and settled down in her father's house, Hossein Saghafi. Once the attack on Sardar Asad was brought to Tehran, she stood on the roof of the house overlooking Baharestan Square, and with some of Bakhtiari's riders, engaged in the war. Her role in conquering Tehran increased her popularity in the tribe and gained a lot of supporters, who honored her as a commander.

== Women's organizations ==
The great constitutional writers like Ahmad Kasravi, Melkzadeh, Adamiat, Nezam Mafi, Mohit Mafi, Nazem al-Islam Kermani, Safa'i, Sediqeh Dowlatabadi, and Rezvani conceive in their works references to women's organizations in the revolution:

There is no information from these associations, since many of them had worked in secret. Morgan Schuster also writes in the book, "The Strangling of Persia" on how he had dealt with the women constitutional associations several times. For example, once through the Treasury Office Secretary, he and his wife were told not to go with the monarchists. When he asked how you know about my spouse coming and going with the monarchists, he gets the response that your spouse's mother who is a member of the women's secret associations had sent the message.

Women's organizations:

- Women's Freedom Association in 1907
- Patriotic Drug Association in 1910
- Women's Absence Union in 1907
- Iranian Women's Association in 1910
- Native Women's Association in 1910
- Khatoon Iran Co. 1910
- Women's Union in 1911
- Great Women's Efforts Association in 1911
- Central Board of Great Women Council in 1911

== After the Constitutional Revolution ==
Only a few pro-constitutional women were activists for women's rights. The first women who participated in the Iranian Women's Rights Movement were constitutionalists themselves or activists of the national movement of the 1901 such as Sediqeh Dowlatabadi, Banoo Amir Sahi Mahsultan, or those from nationalistic intellectual families, such as Mohtaram Eskandari. After the constitutional went down, the mass of uneducated women returned to their former affiliations, and only the educated and enlightened women of the Women's Rights Movement continued their activities for women rights.

At that time, constitutional intellectual men such as Mirzadeh Eshghi, Malkolshaera Bahar and Iraj Mirza supported the newly-created Women's Rights Movement, especially the right to education and the abandonment of the veil. For example, on 12 August 1911, Haj Mohammad Taghi Vakilalaraia, the parliament's first MP in Iran, raised the issue of equality between men and women in the Shura Council and called for women's right to vote. This shocked the parliament and faced opposition from one of the clerics in the parliament.

Although these supports were not very fruitful, but they were more significant than supporting the demands of women during the 1979 revolution.

There were similarities between feminist activism during and after the Constitutional Revolution. After the Constitutional Revolution, women’s activism continued to work through a nationalist structure. Many of the women’s organizations linked everyday activities like education, household tasks, and public health to national goals such as strengthening the population and creating patriotic citizens.

Kashani-Sabet writes about the ideals of vastan parasti (patriotism), education, and literacy. In addition to Kashani-Sabet, there were early-1900s Iranian women’s journals such as “Danish” and “Shikufah” that linked women's education and household management to national contributions. Although there were more schools, education, and groups available for women after the Constitutional Revolution, women still lacked real power in the political world. Kashani-Sabet explains that women were still not able to vote, or make any effect on laws being passed.

During the Constitutional Revolution many feminist activists did not give much attention to minority groups such ethnic or sexual minorities. After the Constitutional Revolution, feminist activists continued to ignore minority groups. While women's activism expanded, there were still groups of women who were not represented. Rawshanak Nawdust believed that many rural women were missing adequate advocacy that the mainstream, middle-class women were receiving. Rural and very poor women had many struggles that needed to be advocated for. However, since the big feminist organizations were majority made of middle-class and educated activists, lower-class women did not receive adequate advocacy.

=== Sediqeh Dowlatabadi ===
Sediqeh Dowlatabadi (1882–1982) was an Iranian journalist and activist of the Constitutional Revolution and the Women's Movement in Iran. She was the founder of the constitutional forum of the Patriotic Association.

She later became the first female rights activist in Iran and published the Women's Language Journal on women's rights. Dowlatabadi was born in Isfahan in 1882. Her father's name was Haj Mirza Hadi Dolatabadi and her mother's name was Khatemeh Bigom. Her father was known as a modern cleric of that time. Sedigheh Dowlatabadi began her education in Persian and Arabic in Tehran. Then she continued her secondary education at Dar Al Fonoun. She was fifteen years old when she married Dr. Adzad Al-Hakma. But, their marriage didn't last long. In 1917, with her efforts, she opened one of the first elementary girls' schools, named "Shariah School". Her father, Haj Seyyed Mirza Hadi Dolatabadi, was a well-known local and renowned clergyman who led the elderly branch of Babiyah. He was the representative of Sobeh Azal in Iran. The events leading up to the Constitutional Revolution opened a new chapter in the life of Yahya Dolatabadi and his younger brother Ali Mohammed. They were among the first members of the small but influential circle of elderly believers (Azali) who included Sayyid Jamal al-Din Va'iz and Malik Al-Mutkelimin. The thoughts of Sheikh Mohammad Munshahidi Yazdi, who was said to be from the Azali believers had influenced him along with Jamal Al-Din Vaez Esfahani and Malik Al-Mutkelimin.

Sediqeh Dowlatabadi died in Tehran on 6 August 1961 at the age of 80. She was buried next to her brother in the cemetery of Imam Zadeh Esmail in Zargerte. Some ruined her tomb after the 1979 revolution.

== See also ==
- Iranian Constitutional Revolution
- Women's Freedom Association
- Women's Movement in Iran
- Jam'iyat-e Nesvan-e Vatankhah
- Mokhadarat Vatan Association
- Iranian women
- Constitutional Revolution's Associations
