= Kashf-e hijab =

1936 decree banning Islamic veils in Iran

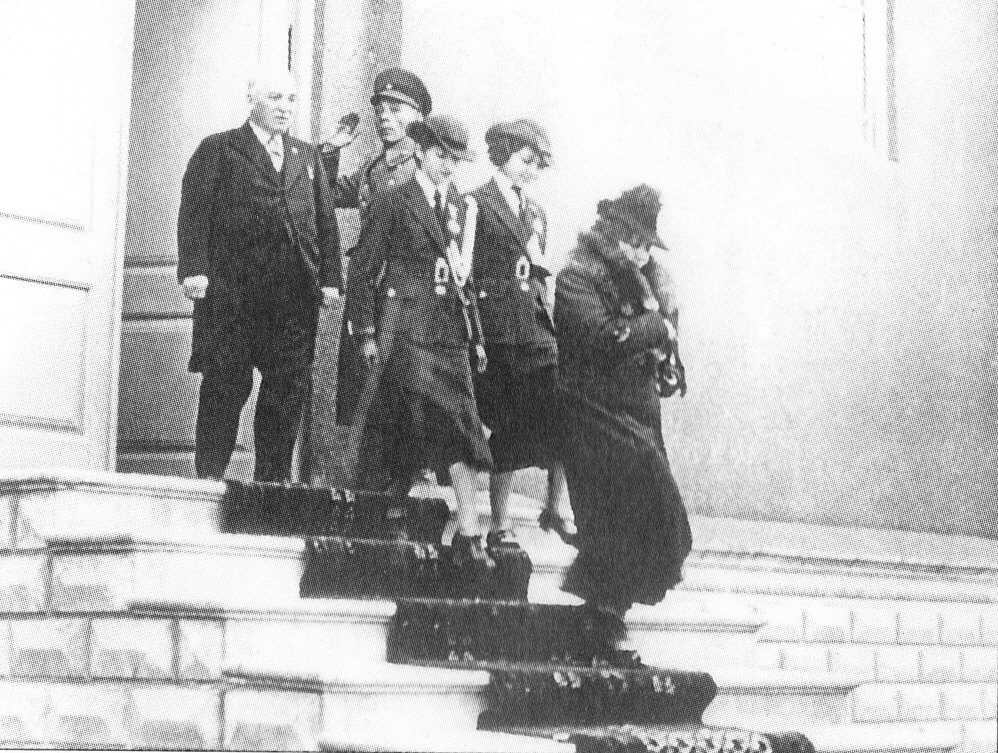
Reza Shah's wife Tadj ol-Molouk, and their daughters Shams and Ashraf, 8 January 1936, famously participating in a public ceremony without hijab for the first time.

On 8 January 1936, Reza Shah of Iran issued a decree known as Kashf-e hijab (also Romanized as Kashf-e hijāb and Kashf-e hejāb, Persian: کشف حجاب, lit. 'Unveiling') banning all Islamic veils (including hijab and chador), an edict that was swiftly and forcefully implemented. The government also banned many types of male traditional clothing.

The ban was enforced for a period of five years (1936–1941); after this, women were free to dress as they wished for forty years until the Iranian Revolution of 1979, when the reverse ban against unveiling was introduced. One of the enduring legacies of Reza Shah is turning dress into an integral problem of Iranian politics.

== Background and impact ==
In 1936, Reza Shah banned the veil and encouraged Iranians to adopt European dress in an effort to promote nation-building in a country with many tribal, regional, religious, and class-based variations in clothing.

It was the policy of the Shah to increase women's participation in society as a method of the modernization of the country, in accordance with the example of Turkey. The Queen and the other women of the royal family assisted in this when they started to perform public representational duties as role models for women participating in public society, and they also played an active part as role models in the Kashf-e hijab.

The reform was long in the making. In the second half of the 19th-century, Iranian upper-class men started to visit Western Europe and started to adopt Western clothing for themselves, which made Western fashion become considered as a sign of progress and modernism in Iran among parts of the elite. Prior to this, during the era of slavery in Iran, female slaves (kaniz) were allowed to move about alone in public outside of the sex segregation of the harem unveiled, which separated them from free women, but slave women had not been seen as respectable women.

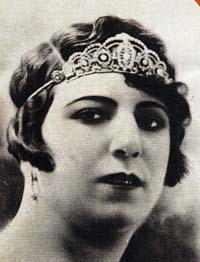
Qamar-ol-Moluk Vaziri in the 1920s

From the 1920s, the Iranian women's movement supported unveiling, and a few individual Iranian women started to appear unveiled. In 1924, the singer Qamar-ol-Moluk Vaziri broke gender segregation and seclusion by performing unveiled in gender-mixed company at the Grand Hotel in Tehran and at the Royal Palace Theater. Iranian women's rights activists supported unveiling, and the feminist Sediqeh Dowlatabadi is believed to have been the first woman in Iran to have appeared in public without the veil in 1928. To appear without a veil or even favor it in public debate was very controversial, and women's rights activists who spoke in favor of unveiling sometimes had to be protected by the police. In 1926, the Shah specifically provided police protection for individual women who appeared unveiled but with a scarf or a hat to cover the hair.

In 1928, the queen of Afghanistan, Soraya Tarzi, appeared unveiled in public with the Shah during her official visit in Iran. The clergy protested and asked the Shah to tell the foreign queen to cover up, but he refused. His refusal caused rumours that the Shah planned to abolish the veil in Iran. Later that year the Shah's wife, Queen Tadj ol-Molouk, attended the Fatima Masumeh Shrine during her pilgrimage in Qom wearing a veil which did not cover her completely, as well as showing her face, for which she was harshly criticized by a cleric. As a response, Reza Shah publicly beat the cleric who had criticized the queen the next day.

The unveiling of women had a huge symbolic importance to achieve women's emancipation and participation in society, and the shah introduced the reform gradually so as not to cause unrest. In the mid-1930s, only four thousand out of 6.5 million Iranian women ventured into public places without veils, almost all in Tehran and consisting mainly of Western-educated daughters of the upper class, foreign wives of recent returnees from Europe, and middle-class women from the minorities.

Female teachers were encouraged to unveil in 1933 and schoolgirls and women students in 1935. In 1935, the women's committee Kanun-e Banuvan ('Ladies Society') was formed with support by the government in which women's rights activists campaigned for unveiling. The reform to allow female teachers and students not to veil, as well as allowing female students to study alongside men, were all reforms opposed and criticized by the Shia clergy.

The official declaration of unveiling were made on 8 January 1936, and the queen and her daughters were given an important role in this event. That day, Reza Shah attended the graduation ceremony of the Tehran Teacher's College with the queen and their two daughters unveiled and dressed in modern clothes, without veils. The queen handed out diplomas, while the shah spoke about how half the population being disregarded in the past, and told women that the future was now in their hands. This was the first time an Iranian queen showed herself in public. Afterwards, the Shah had pictures of his unveiled wife and daughters published, and unveiling enforced throughout Iran.

== Enforcement ==
To enforce this decree, the police were ordered to physically remove the veil from any woman who wore it in public. Women who refused were beaten, their hijabs and chadors torn off, and their homes forcibly searched.

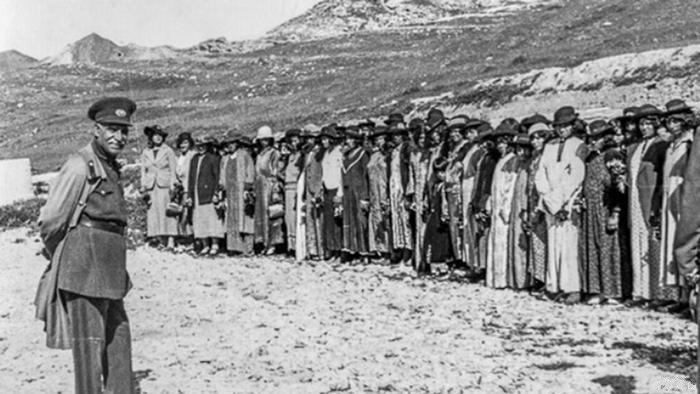
Lur nomadic women publicly unveiled in front of Reza Shah at the start of kashf-e hijab in 1936

Until Reza Shah's abdication in 1941, many conservative women simply chose not leave their houses in order to avoid confrontations, and a few even committed suicide to avoid removing their hijabs due to the decree. A far larger escalation of violence occurred in the summer of 1935, when Reza Shah ordered all men to wear European-style bowler hats. This provoked massive non-violent demonstrations in July in the city of Mashhad, which were brutally suppressed by the Imperial Iranian Army, resulting in the deaths of an estimated 100 to 500 people (including women and children).

== Reactions ==
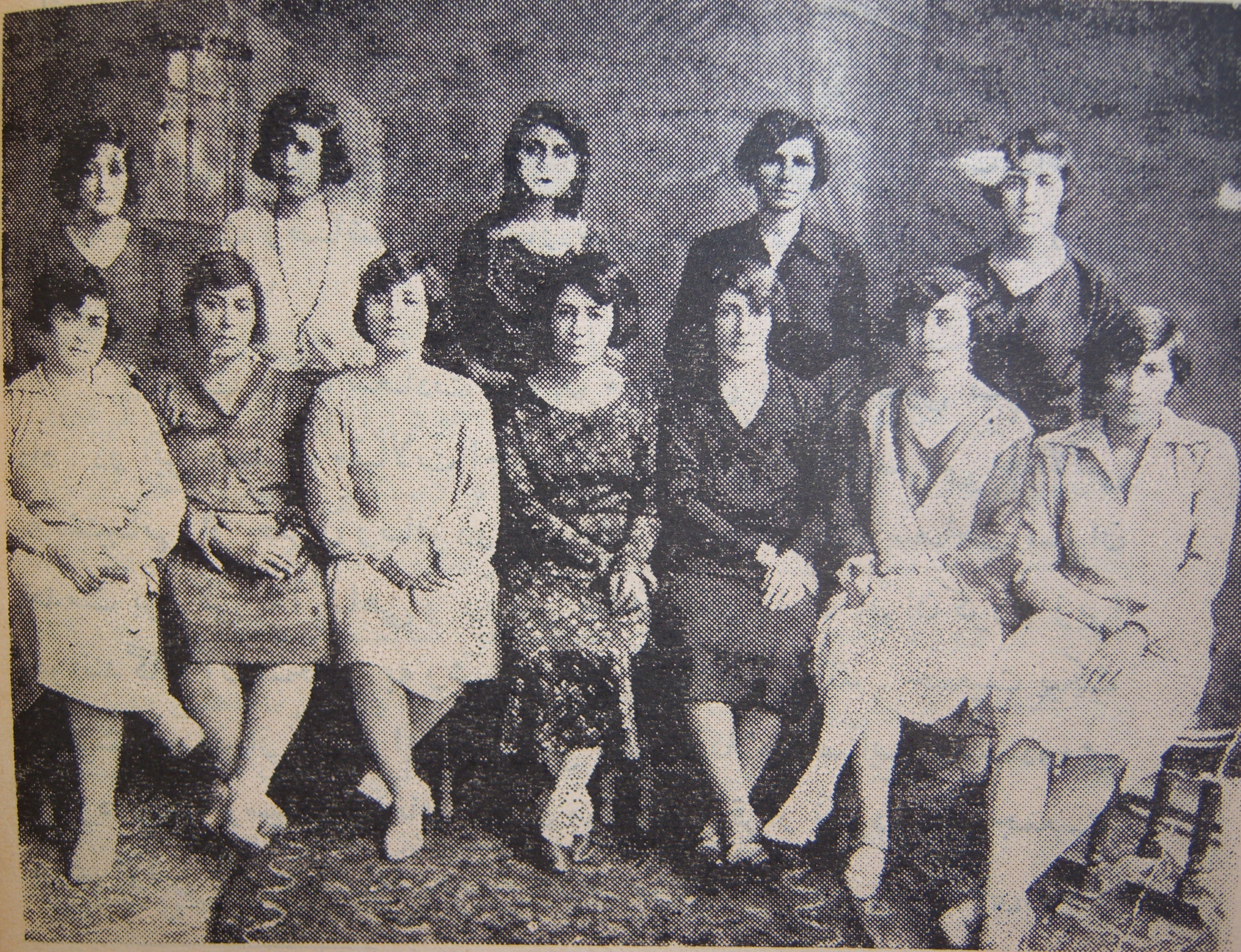
The women of the Iranian women's movement largely consisted of Western-educated elite women positive to unveiling. This image of the Board of Governors of the women's organization Jam'iyat-e Nesvan-e Vatankhah, Tehran, is dated to 1922–1932; before the Kashf-e hijab reform in 1936.

The unveiling was met with different opinions within Iran.

The Iranian women's movement had generally been in favor of unveiling since its beginning. Unveiling was supported by progressive women's rights advocates such as Khadijeh Afzal Vaziri and Sediqeh Dowlatabadi, who campaigned in support for it. Dowlatabadi was an active supporter of the reform, and engaged in the women's committee Kanun-e Banuvan, which was led by the Shah's daughter Princess Shams to unite women organizations and prepare women for unveiling. Many of Iran's leading feminists and women's rights activists organized in the Kanun-e Banuvan to campaign in favor of the Kashf-e hijab, among them Hajar Tarbiat, Vaziri, Dowlatabadi, Farrokhroo Parsa and Parvin E'tesami. The Iranian women's rights activists and feminists were mainly from the educated elite, and some had appeared unveiled even before the Kashf-e hijab: Dowlatabadi is believed to have been the first woman in Iran to have done so, appearing in public in 1928 completely unveilied. However, there were also some feminists who opposed the reform; because while they supported unveiling, they did not support a mandatory unveiling, but rather women's right to choose.

Some Western historians have stated that the reform would have been a progressive step if women had initiated it themselves, but that the method of banning it humiliated and alienated many Iranian women, since its effect was, because of the effect of traditional beliefs, comparable to a hypothetical situation in which European women were suddenly ordered to go out topless into the street. Some historians have pointed out that Reza Shah's ban on veiling and his policies were unseen in Atatürk's Turkey, which succeeded in unveiling without introducing a ban. The Shah's decree was commented on by the British consul in Tehran:

Next to their daily bread, what affects the people most widely is what touches the code of social habit that, in Islam, is endorsed by religion. Among Muslims, the Iranians are not a fanatical people. The unveiling of women inaugurated in the preceding year attacks the people's social conservatism as much as their religious prejudice. Above all, like conscription, it symbolizes the steady penetration into their daily lives of an influence that brings with it more outside interference, more taxation. But one can easily exaggerate the popular effect of unveiling; it is a revolution for the well-to-do of the towns, but lower down the scale, where women perform outdoor manual labour, its effects both on habit and on the family budget diminish until among the tribal folk of all degrees they are comparatively slight. Hence, resistance among the greater part of the people has been passive, and, where existing, has manifested itself in reluctance of the older generation to go abroad in the streets. It is one thing to forbid women to veil; it is another thing to make them mingle freely with men.

The religious conservatives reacted with opposition toward the reform. According to former Supreme Leader of Iran Ali Khamenei, the policy was aimed at "eradicating the tremendous power of faith" in Muslim societies that was enabled by what he termed the "decency of women", as hijab in his view prevented Muslim women from suffering from the "malicious abuse" that he regarded women in the West to be victims of, and what in his view made people preoccupied with sexual desires.

== Aftermath ==
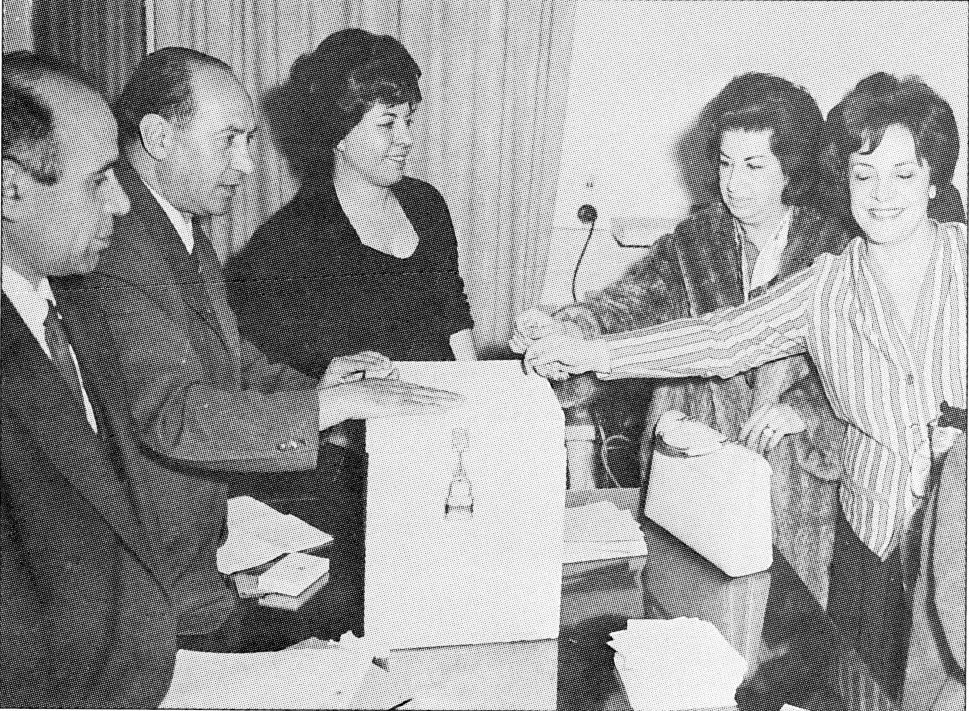
Unveiled middle-class women vote in the election of 1963. In the period of 1941–1979, veiling was a class marker. The modernization reforms included both unveiling and women's suffrage.

Despite all legal pressures and obstacles, a large proportion of Iranian women continued to wear veils or chadors.

One of the enduring legacies of Reza Shah has been turning dress into an integral issue of Iranian politics. When Reza Shah was deposed in 1941, there were attempts made by conservatives such as the Devotees of Islam (Fedāʾīān-e Eslām; q.v.) who demanded mandatory veiling and a ban on unveiled women, but they did not succeed. Under the next ruler Mohammad Reza Pahlavi, wearing of the veil or chador was no longer an offence, and women were able to dress as they wished.

However, under his regime, the chador became a significant hindrance to climbing the social ladder, as it was considered a badge of backwardness and an indicator of being a member of the lower class. Veiled women were assumed to be from conservative religious families with limited education, while unveiled women were assumed to be from the educated and professional upper- or middle class. The veil became a class marker; while the lower classes started to wear the veil again, the upper classes no longer wore the veil at all, while professional middle-class women such as teachers and nurses appeared unveiled in their work place, but sometimes veiled when they returned home to their families.

Discrimination against the women wearing the hijab or chador still occurred, with public institutions actively discouraging their use, and even some restaurants refusing to admit women who wore them. This period is characterized by the dichotomy between a minority who considered wearing the veil as a sign of backwardness and the majority who did not.

Until 1979, the anniversary of the introduction of Kashf-e hijab was officially celebrated as Women's Liberation Day in Iran.

=== Revolutionary backlash ===
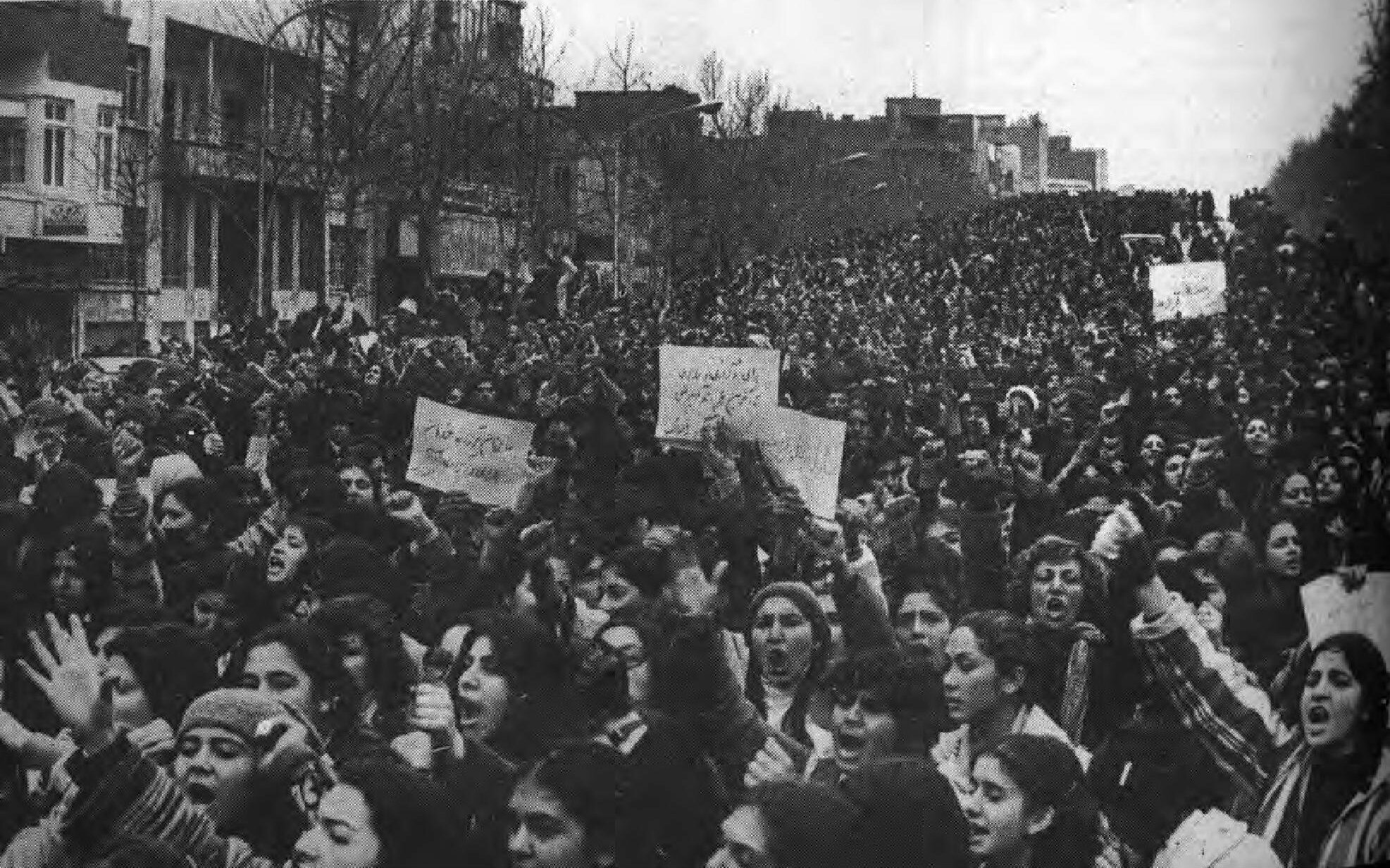
1979 Iranian Women Day's protests against mandatory veiling. Unveiled women protesting against the introduction of mandatory veiling. While many women had worn the veil during the revolution, they had not expected mandatory veiling and did not support it.

During the revolution of the late 1970s, hijab became a political symbol. The hijab was considered by the Pahlavis as a rejection of their modernization policy and thereby of their rule. It became a symbol of opposition to their regime, with many middle-class working women starting to wear it as such.

The revolutionary advocacy for the poor and tradition as a counterpoint to foreign influence brought chador back to popularity among the opposition, and women from different classes wore hijab for different reasons, including to protest the treatment of women as sex objects, solidarity with the conservative women who always wore them, and as a nationalist rejection of foreign influence.

Hijab was considered by conservative traditionalists as a sign of virtue, and thus unveiled women as the opposite. Unveiled women came to be seen by some of the opposition as a symbol of Western cultural colonialism; as victims of Westoxication, "a super-consumer" of products of imperialism, a propagator of "corrupt Western culture", undermining the traditionalist conception of "morals of society", and as overly dressed up "bourgeois dolls", who had lost their honor. The veil thus came to be some opposition women's way of expressing the revolutionary "demand for respect and dignity" and a solidarity with Iranian culture as opposed to culture colonialism, rather than a sign of backwardness.

Many protestors during the revolution belonged to the conservative fraction. Unlike in the past, when conservative women did not mix with men, thousands of veiled women participated in religious processions alongside men, when they also expressed their anti-Shah protests. In the eyes of the conservatives, the veil was thus now not a hindrance, but empowerment enabling access to public spheres. The conservative view on unveiled women made them vulnerable to sexual harassment and hostility from conservative male revolutionaries, while the hijab protected women from harassment, because conservative men regarded them as more respectable. In order to participate in anti-Shah protests without being subjected to harassment, many women also started to wear the veil as protection: two slogans of the revolution were: "Wear a veil, or we will punch your head" and "Death to the unveiled".

After the Islamic Revolution, the policy inherited from the Kashf-e hijab was turned around. Instead of being forced to remove their veil, women were now subjected to the reversed ban against unveiling, and the veil were now enforced upon all women. The non-conservative women, who had worn the veil as a symbol of opposition during the revolution, had not expected veiling to become mandatory, and when the veil was first made mandatory in February 1979 it was met with protests and demonstrations by liberal and leftist women, and thousands of women participated in a women's march on International Women's Day, 8 March 1979, in protest against mandatory veiling. The protests resulted in the temporary retraction of mandatory veiling. When the leftists and the liberals had been eliminated and the conservatives secured solitary control, veiling was enforced on all women. This began with the "Islamification of offices" in July 1980, when unveiled women were refused entry to government offices and public buildings, and banned from appearing unveiled at their work places under the risk of being fired. On the streets, unveiled women were attacked by revolutionaries in the line with the revolutionary slogans "Wear a veil, or we will punch your head" and "Death to the unveiled". In July 1981, an edict of mandatory veiling in public was introduced, which was followed in 1983 by an Islamic Punishment Law, introducing a punishment of 74 lashes on unveiled women. The law was enforced by members of the Islamic Revolution Committees patrolling the streets, and later by the Guidance Patrols, also called the Morality Police.

== Gallery ==
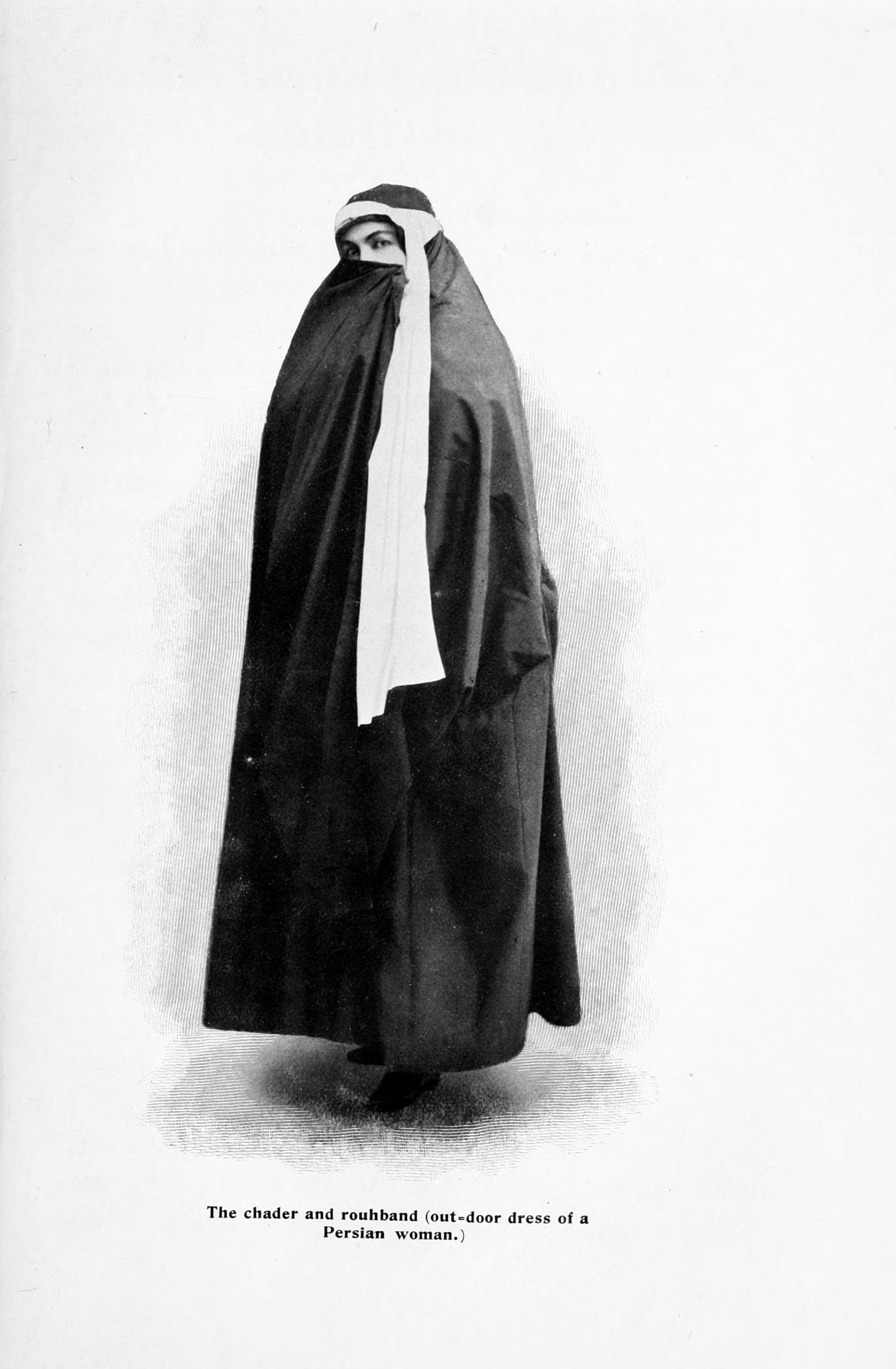
Traditional chador, 1900

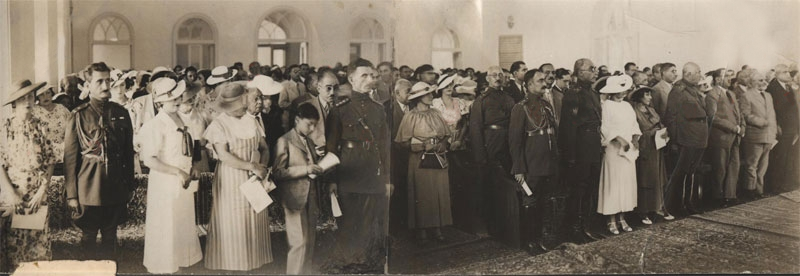
Kashf-e hijab, 1936

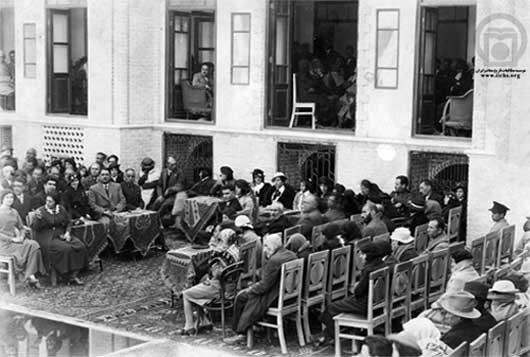
Kashf-e Hijab in Qom, 1936

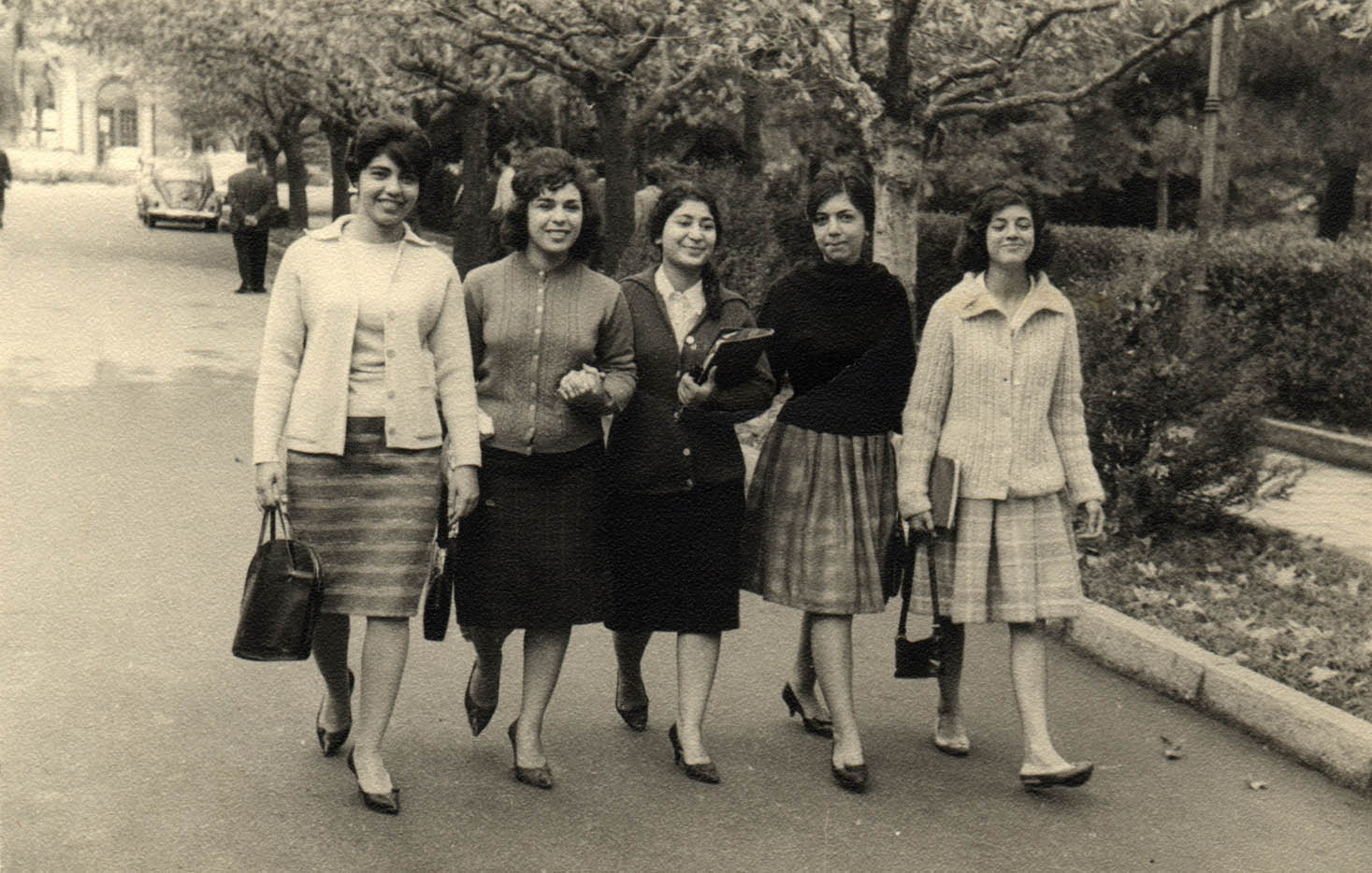
Women in 1950s Iran

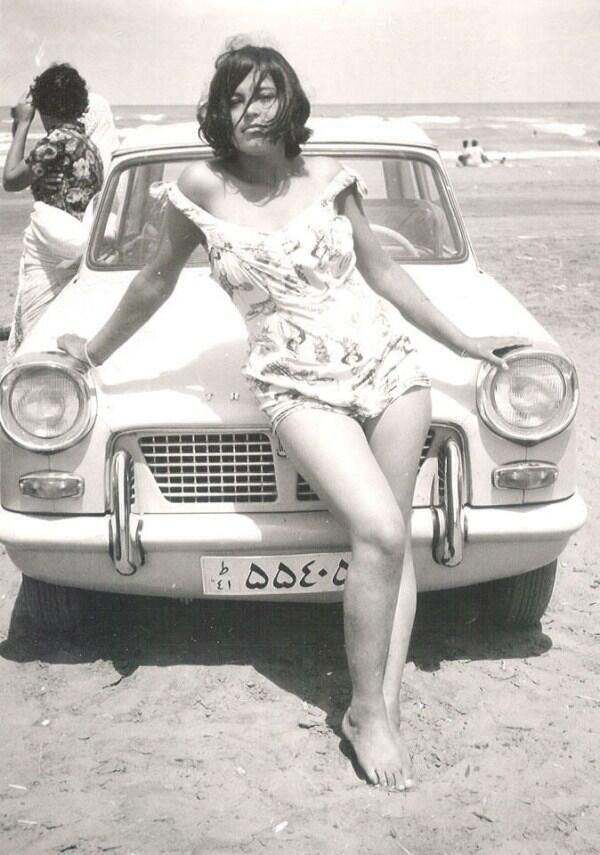
An Iranian poses in her swimsuit at a beach in the 1960s

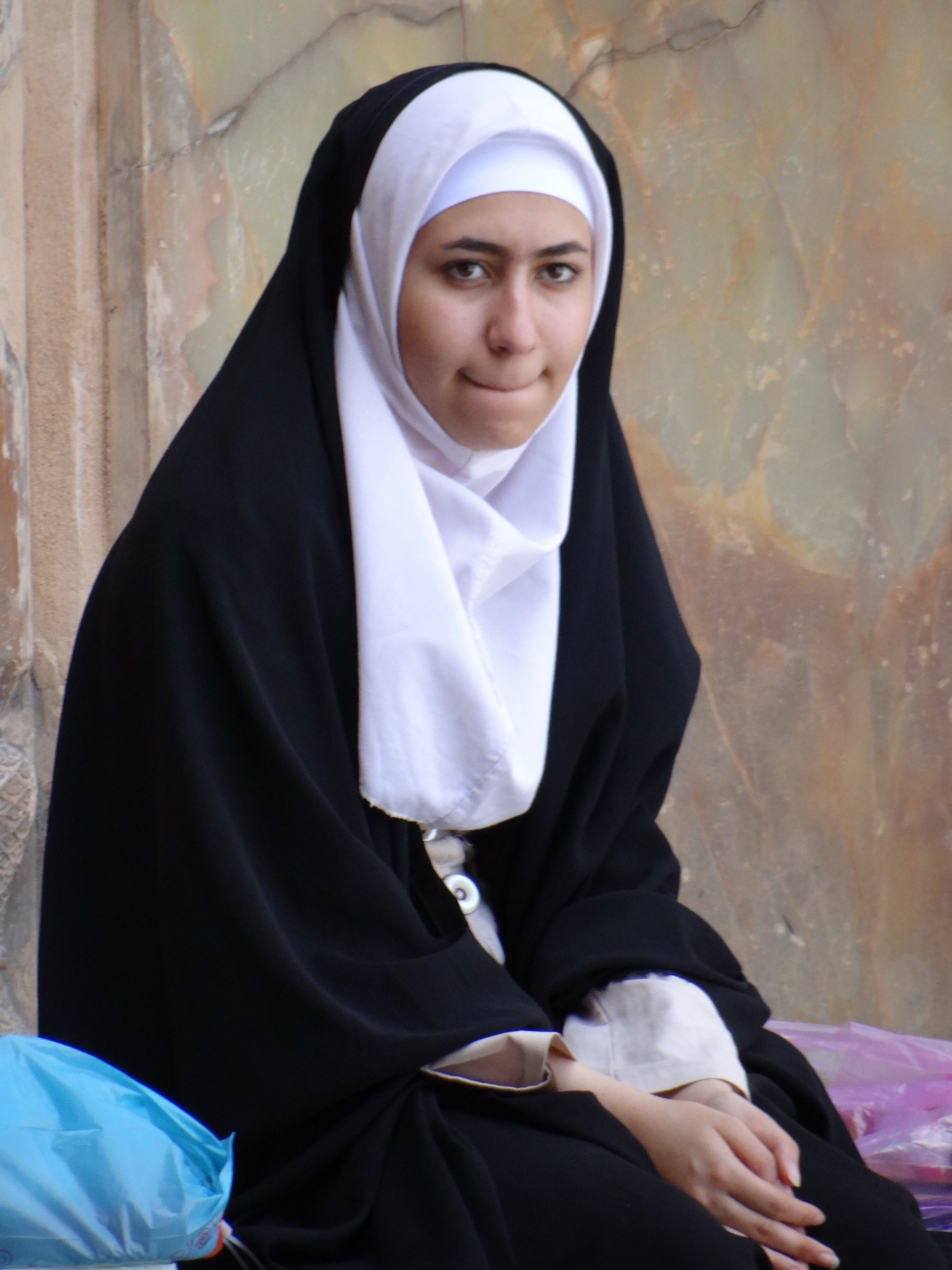
Woman in Chador, outside Shah Mosque, Isfahan, Iran, 2012

== See also ==
- Goharshad Mosque rebellion
- Human rights in Pahlavi Iran
- The Culture of Nakedness and the Nakedness of Culture
- Hujum and the Soviet unveiling in Central Asia
- Gruaja Shqiptare and the unveiling in Albania
- Ali Bayramov Club and the unveiling in Azerbaijan
- Adeni Women´s Club and the unveiling in Yemen
- Huda Sha'arawi and the Egyptian unveiling of the 1920s
- Latife Uşaki and the Turkish unveiling of the 1920s
- Soraya Tarzi and the Afghan unveiling of the 1920s
- Humaira Begum and the Afghan unveiling of the 1950s
- Acid attacks on women in Isfahan
