= Majma'-e Enghelabi-ye Nesvan =

Iranian women's rights organization

Majma'-e Enghelabi-ye Nesvan (Persian: مجمع انقلابی نسوان; lit. Revolutionary Society of Women) was a feminist association founded in 1927 by Zandokht Shirazi in Shiraz, Iran.

== History ==
Shirazi established the organization in 1927 (1306 SH) at the age of eighteen, with the aim of promoting gender equality and raising awareness among women about their rights. Under pressure from religious groups, the government of Reza Shah initially ordered the association to change its name to Nahzat-e Nesvān (نهضت نسوان; lit. Women's Movement). Ultimately, the group was declared illegal after nine months of activity. Following a formal religious condemnation (takfir) by a prominent cleric in Shiraz, Zandokht Shirazi was compelled to relocate to Tehran, where she began publishing the magazine Dokhtaran-e Iran (دختران ایران; lit. Daughters of Iran).

== See also ==
- Women in Iran
- Women's rights movement in Iran
- Women in the Persian Constitutional Revolution
- Jam'iyat-e Nesvan-e Vatankhah
