= Shahnaz Azad =

Iranian journalist

- Born: 1901; Tabriz, Sublime State of Iran
- Died: 1961 (aged 59–60)
- Spouse: Abolqasem Azad Maraghi
- Father: Haji-Mirza Hassan Roshdieh

Shahnaz Rushdieh, also known as Shahnaz Azad (Persian: شهناز آزاد; 1901–1961), was a journalist and a pioneer of the women's movement in Iran. She was also the editor of the Women's Letter.

== Early life ==
Shahnaz was born in a cultural and middle-class family in Tabriz. Her father Haji-Mirza Hassan Roshdieh was a well-educated and a schoolboy. In her youth, she married Abolqasem Azad Maraghi, who was a journalist. In 1920, before the age of 20, she also published the Women's Letter for women's awareness in Iran about their rights. She published articles on women's rights, hijab, national and international news, and all her articles were written for women. Shahnaz along with her husband, were faced with harassment, imprisonment and exile, shortage of funds and financial problems for the publication of their Newspapers.

== Death ==
Shahnaz Azad died at the age of 60 in 1961.

== See also ==
- Women in Constitutional Revolution
- Persian Constitutional Revolution
- Women's rights movement in Iran
- Women's rights in Iran
