= Feminism Everyday =

Iranian feminist organization

- فمینیسم روزمره
- Logo of Feminism Everyday
- Formation: 2014
- Founder: Nasrin Afzali
- Website: feminismeveryday.com

Feminism Everyday (Persian: فمینیسم روزمره) is an Iranian feminist organization founded in 2014 by the Iranian-American activist, Nasrin Afzali.

== Creation and aims ==
Feminism Everyday was created in 2014 by a "group of culturally and ethnically diverse Iranian activists in the United States".

The group aims to share the experiences of feminist Iranians with feminist movements elsewhere. It focuses on issues such as reproductive rights, sexual harassment, body positivity, and legal inequalities affecting women in Iran and beyond.

== Actions ==
Feminism Everyday (FE) used online social media to circumvent government restrictions in Iran, directly supporting, via discussion, those most affected by restrictive policies. FE contributed to discursive change: the introduction of new terminology and the public statements made by organisations in relation to women's rights. Specific methods included cooperating with Iranian news media: submitting articles for publication for Iranian audiences, and in the case of articles that the news media had to self-censor, publishing these on behalf of those media.

FE published names of organisations whose employees reported sexual harassment or sexual assault privately to FE, seeing this as being inspired by the #MeToo movement.
