= Women's Freedom Association =

Iranian women's rights organization

The Women’s Freedom Association (Persian: انجمن حریت نسوان) was formed in 1907 with the discussions and plans of a number of women and men intellectuals of the Constitutional Movement, and its meetings focused on the subordinate position of women in Iran.

== History ==
During the Iranian Constitutional Revolution, there were many secret and semi-congressional associations in Iran. In this period of time, women's associations were secretly formed in the constitutional movement. Many years after the assembly and the World War II, organizations were set up that focused on women's rights.

== Goals and activities ==
The founders of the Women’s Freedom Association wanted to familiarize women with the rules of socializing, attending the community, and to raise their confidence in speaking in the community, especially when men are at present. In this forum, both women and men were members and participated in the sessions, but in order to build confidence in women, only female members were allowed to speak at the meetings. Meetings were held secretly and no man or woman were allowed to attend the meetings alone and they had to come with one of their relatives or acquaintances.

Some of the famous members of the Women's Freedom Association were: Mirza Baji Khanum, Mrs. Navab Samii, Sedigheh Dolatabadi, Mireh Khanum, Golin Khanum Aghgar, Eftekhar al-Saltanah, and Taj al-Saltanah (daughters of Nasser-al-Din Shah), Afsar Saltanah, Shamsolmuluk Joyurkalam, Mrs. Hakim, Mrs. Jordan, Mrs. Dr. Ayub, Afandiyeh Khanum, and Zandokht Shirazi (daughter of the Shaikh-al-Reyes Qajar).

Council meetings were secretly held outside Tehran in Fischarabad, at the Pertiva Flower Garden. But one day, a man who had not been allowed to attend the meeting due to his lack of familiarity with the woman, took the news of the meetings with the fanatics of the Abbasabad market and they gathered many people and rushed to the venue. The officers of the order did not do anything. Before the crowd of the fanatics reaching the congregation to the gates called Government Gates, one of the Armenians students at his photographic shop, Antoine Khan, became aware and bailed to inform the members of the association with his bike. As a result, the members were dismissed at the meeting, and the Association of Women's Freedom was forced to dissolve.

== See also ==
- Jam'iyat-e Nesvan-e Vatankhah
- Women in Constitutional Revolution
- Constitutional Revolution's Associations
- Majma'-e Enghelabi-ye Nesvan
