= Jalal Afshar =

Iranian scientist (1894–1975)

Jalal Afshar جلال افشار
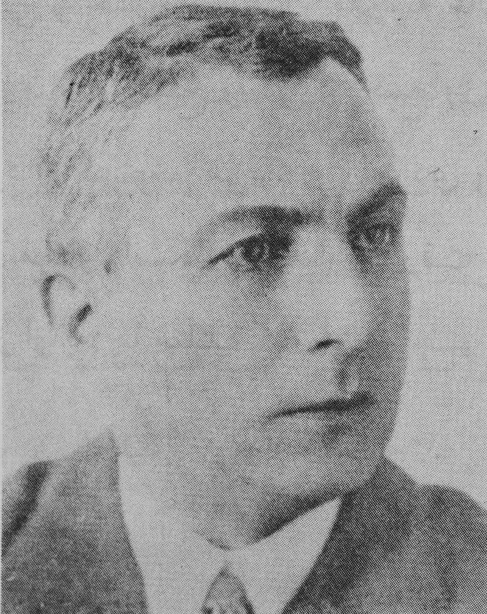
- Born: 1894; Urmia, Sublime State of Iran
- Died: 1975 March 5 (aged 81); Tehran, Imperial State of Iran
- Education: Shanyavsky Natural Sciences Faculty, Moscow
- Occupations: Researcher and university professor
- Known for: Iranian scientist
- Relatives: A descendant of Mozaffar ad-Din Shah Qajar

Jalal Afshar (Persian: جلال افشار; 1894–1975) was an Iranian scientist, phytopathologist, entomologist, and professor at the Faculty of Agriculture, University of Tehran, located in Karaj. He is recognized as one of the leading entomologists in Iran and West Asia, credited as the founder of the Zoology and Entomology Museum in Karaj and the pioneer of plant pathology research in Iran.

== Biography ==
Jalal Afshar was born in 1894 in Urmia. He was the son of Majd al-Saltaneh Afshar, a descendant of the Qajar dynasty. His younger sister was Mastoureh Afshar, a women's rights activist. Afshar completed his early education in his hometown and, at the age of 16, ventured to Russia for further studies. He attended high school in Tbilisi and later pursued higher education in Moscow at the Shanyavsky Natural Sciences Faculty, where he completed his studies in entomology in 1919. Upon returning to Iran in 1920, he commenced his career at the Pasteur Institute.

After a brief period at the Ministry of Agriculture, Trade, and Public Welfare (now known as the Ministry of Agriculture), Afshar focused on researching plant pests. Simultaneously, he began teaching at the Barzegaran School (predecessor of the Faculty of Agriculture in Karaj today). Starting in 1926, Afshar taught courses in zoology, entomology, and plant pest control at the School of Agriculture (current Karaj Agricultural High School and Faculty). During this time, he established a small entomology laboratory at the Faculty of Agriculture, dedicated to the collection and identification of harmful insects affecting Iranian crops.

From 1934 onwards, while maintaining his teaching position, Afshar took charge of plant pest control activities at the Ministry of Agriculture. He pioneered biological control against the Australian citrus whitefly in northern Iran. In 1943, he founded the Entomology and Plant Pest Control Laboratory, initially comprising two small rooms within the Ministry of Agriculture. In 1944, he assumed the directorship of the Entomology Laboratory at the Faculty of Agriculture in Karaj. Subsequently, he managed the Entomology Laboratory at the Ministry of Agriculture, which later evolved into the Plant Protection Research Institute and the Plant Protection Organization of Iran.

Retiring from government service in 1965, Afshar continued to contribute to scientific and technical fields. In 1972, the University of Tehran recognized his forty-six years of exemplary service by appointing him as a distinguished professor. Jalal Afshar died on 5 March 1975, at the age of 81.

=== Legacy ===
Jalal Afshar's legacy includes numerous scientific publications, articles, and a multitude of students and followers who have made significant contributions to various fields of phytopathology, entomology, and plant pathology.

=== Personal life ===
Jalal Afshar married Behjat al-Zaman Esfandiari, the sister of Nima Yushij, the renowned Persian poet. They had a son named Taghrol Afshar, who drowned in the Caspian Sea at the age of 23 in 1977.

== Museum of Zoology and Entomology ==
Afshar played a crucial role in establishing the Zoology and Entomology Museum at the Faculty of Agriculture in Karaj. Founded in 1928, the museum is one of the most comprehensive zoological museums in Iran. Located at the Pardis of Agriculture and Natural Resources of the University of Tehran in Karaj, the museum was constructed with the support of Dr. Afshar, who was then the head of the Plant Protection Department at the Faculty. Afshar considered this museum the pinnacle of his life's work and remained committed to its enhancement until the end of his life.
