= Badr al-Maluk Bamdad =

Iranian journalist, teacher, social activist (1898–1987)

- بدرالملوک بامداد
- Born: 1898; Tehran, Iran
- Died: 24 june 1987, Tehran (age 89)
- Education: Columbia University
- Occupations: journalist, teacher, women's rights activist
- Known for: Founder of the first co-educational primary school in Iran

Badr al-Maluk Bamdad (Persian: بدرالملوک بامداد), (1898–1987) was a Iranian journalist, teacher, social activist for women's rights during the First and Second Pahlavi eras.

== Early Life and education ==
Her father was a merchant, and her mother was passionate about literature. She initially completed her primary and part of her secondary education with the help of private tutors and learned French. By the age of 14, she was writing articles for the magazine Iranshahr and several other publications printed abroad.

She finished high school at age 19 and entered the Darol-Mo'allemat (Teachers' Training College for Women); eight years later, she was appointed deputy head of the institution, which trained teachers, and during her ten years of service there, she authored several educational books for its students and faculty.

== Career ==
She was 37 when women were granted permission to attend university in 1935; she was among the first to enroll in the Higher Teachers' Training College (Danesh-saraye Ali), graduating with degrees in Literature and Educational Sciences. She also served as the head of the college for a time and continued writing educational texts, such as The Goal of Women's Education.

At age 45, she founded the weekly magazine zan emruz, writing most of its content herself. At age 48, she had the opportunity to travel to the United States to further her education. Badr al-Maluk Bamdad When she was 51 years old obtained a Master’s degree in Early childhood education from Columbia University and returned to Iran.

She was 53 years old when she opened Iran's first co-educational primary school in Tehran, putting into practice what she had learned in the United States. Bamdad was an active member of the Kanoun-e-Banovan.

== Death ==
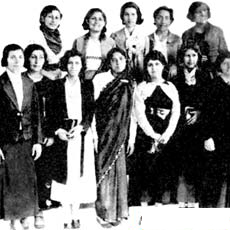
The first group of women to enter the university. Front row, from right to left: Princess Kavous, Shams-ol-Molouk Mosaheb, Badr al-Molouk Bamdad, Seraj-ol-Nesa (from India), Mehrangiz Manouchehrian, Zahra Eskandari, Batoul Samii-Zadeh.

Badr al-Maluk Bamdad passed away in Tehran on 24 June 1987, at the age of 89.

== Legacy ==
In Tehran District 18 Municipality, 22 Bahman Street, located off Shahid Afkhami Street, has been named after her.

== Bibliography ==
- Ethics Books for Secondary School Students
- Household Management and Child-Rearing (for students in girls' high schools)
- Library Science for Girls' High Schools (various levels)
- Cookery Guide
- Psychology (or the Study of the Self) in Relation to Education and Upbringing
- Iranian Women from the Constitutional Revolution to the White Revolution

== Gallery ==
Household Management and Child-Rearing. One of the first books published by Bamdad

Images published in the book Speeches of the Women's Center in 1935. First row: Badrolmolouk Bamdad (second person)
