= Mohtaram Eskandari =

Iranian feminist activist and journalist (1895–1924)

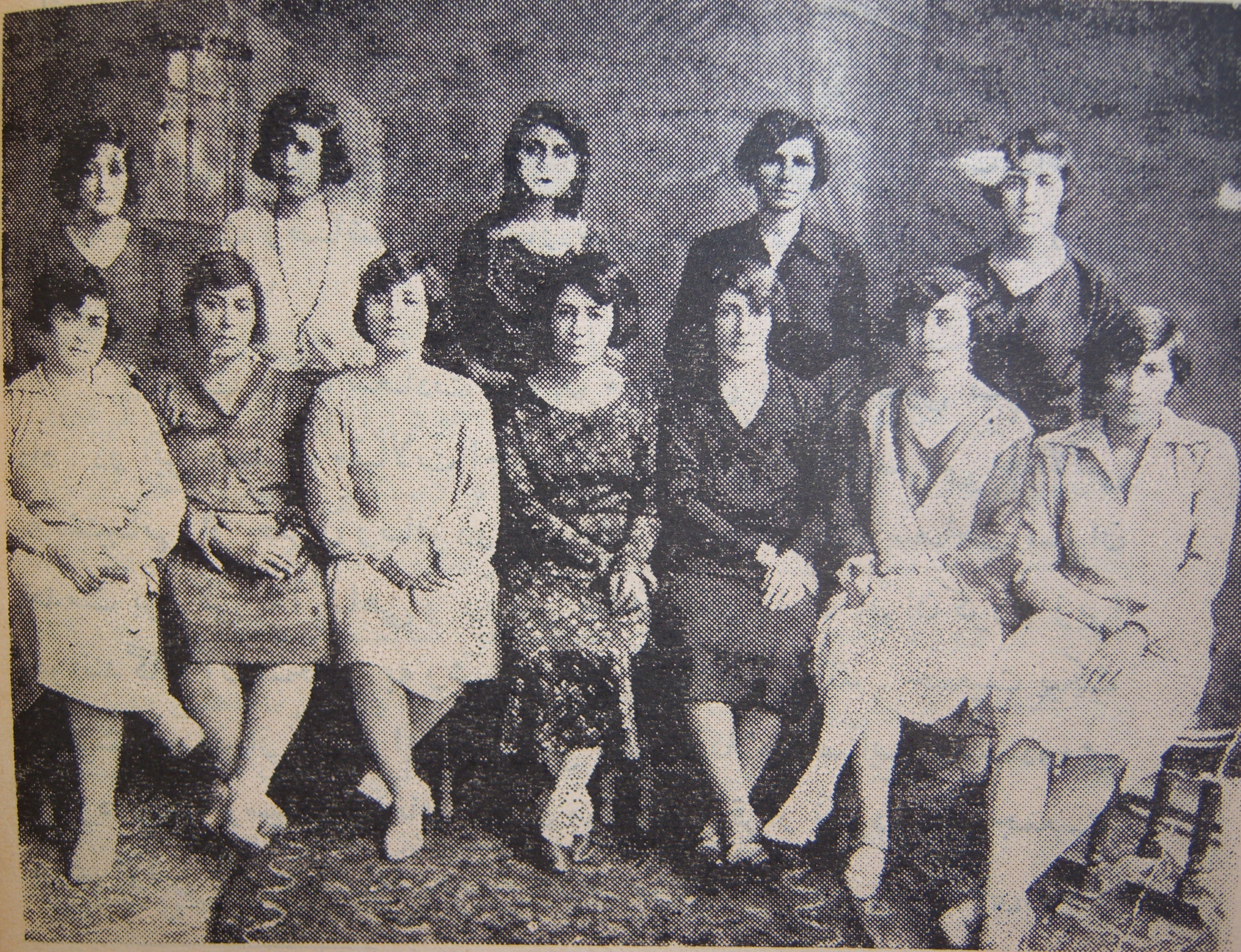
Board of Governors of Association of Patriotic Women (Jam'iyat-e Nesvan-e Vatankhah), Tehran, 1922–1932.

Mohtaram Eskandari (Persian: محترم اسکندری; 1895 – 27 July 1924), was an Iranian intellectual and a pioneer of the Iranian women's movement. She was the co-founder and first leader of Jam'iyat-e Nesvan-e Vatankhah, the first women's rights association in Iran.

As the first chairperson and publisher of the Nesvan-e Vatankhah newspaper, Eskandari delivered lectures in support of women's rights, including women's education and the removal of veils. She planned marches for members of the association as well.

== Biography ==
Mohtaram was born in 1895 into a liberal, intellectually vibrant and politically active family in Tehran. Her father, Mohammad Ali Mirza Eskandari (Prince of Ali Khan), was a constitutionalist and founder of the Adamiat Society and taught at Dar ul-Funun. She first studied at home with her father and received an education in Persian and French literature under the supervision of Mirza Mohammad Ali Khan Mohaqqeqi. Eskandari and Mohaqqeqi would later marry.

As an adult, Eskandari suffered from a spinal cord injury, was teaching for some time, and served as the director of a state school for girls. Her dissatisfaction with the state of women's rights in Iran after the Constitutional Revolution led her to establish Jam'iyat-e Nesvan-e Vatankhah, "Patriotic Women's League of Iran," in 1922, which uniquely molded together feminism and Iranian nationalism.

She was disappointed with the achievements of the Constitutional Revolution for women, so in 1922, along with a number of leading women in Tehran, she established the Patriotic Women's Association. She lectured, administered the Association's magazine, and planned the community's marches. In one of the rallies, they burned leaflets against women, which resulted in Mohtaram's arrest by government officials. But this made her well known among the people of Iran. She also founded a school for adult women and promoted the use of domestic products.

Mohtaram Eskandari died at the age of 29 in Tehran in July 1924 – 1925, due to complications from a back surgery she had undergone as a child.

== Women's association ==
In 1922, the Patriotic Women's Association was established through the efforts of Mohtaram Eskandari, Nurolhouda Mangeneh, Mastureh Afshar, and Madam Fakhr Afagh. The right to education for women was one of the most important goals of this association.

With ten elected women, the board of directors was formed by the Patriotic Women's Association, and the delegation elected Eskandari as the first head of the community.

The association "Patriotic Women", on the path to the goals of women's education and learning, published the magazine Nasvan–e Vatankhah (Persian: The Patriotic Women), in the wake of the establishment of classes for adult women. The magazine was the official organ of the community that focused on women's issues and women's rights. Its owner was Madam Molouk Eskandari, and its first director was Mohtaram Eskandari. The magazine published eleven issues over three years (from 1923 to 1926) and attracted many liberal women.

== Rebel on women's wickedness ==
"Wicked Women" (Persian: مکر زنان), is the name given to a book by a number of opponents of women's education and freedom in Tehran. This leaflet was sold by the boys in the main squares of the city. Noor-ol-Hoda Mangeneh has written in her memories how insulting the leaflet was and mentioned the below:

There were books published in the name of the deceitful women, which, every day, the young newspaper sellers seized a large number of them and cried out loudly, the book of women's wickedness, the wickedness of women, the wicked women... So we decided that, on certain days, at ten o'clock in the morning, some seven or eight women from our association gather in the Sepah Square, and every ten, fifteen, twenty seeds of those books were taken from the children and lighted on fire with the matches we had.

Then one day, Mohtaram Eskandari, along with seven liberal women, went to the Toopkhaneh Square to remove the "Wicked Women" leaflets from the hands of the children there. They set the flyers on fire in the middle of the square, in the same exact place where the constitutionalists were once hanged. When those kids asked for the money of the leaflets to be given to them, Mohtaram and the other liberal women mentioned to them that they will not receive any money.

== Arrested for rebellion ==
After burning the books in the square and the children crying loudly about their burned books, police arrested the women there and took them to the commission (Police station and the first interrogation area of the accused). The women were taken to different rooms and interrogated separately. In the book "Iranian Woman from Constitutionalism to the White Revolution", Badr al-Molouk wrote:

Mohtaram Eskandari, said in the governmental court that we burned the books to show our action in defending the honor and uprightness of your mothers and sisters. We have wisdom like all human beings, and we are not wicked. Her passionate and intense words influenced the officers in the court and brought them to support her.

Mohtaram Eskandari's name was recorded as the first woman who was arrested in contemporary history for rebellion in Iran.

== Illness and death ==
Mohtaram was hospitalised for some time after her arrest and the burning of the leaflets due to the severity of the illness she had and doctors said surgery should be performed on the vertebral column. She had suffered from the condition since childhood and also she was ridiculed because her back was always bent. Even while ill, she continued her efforts for women's equality and advised the women in the Patriotic Women's Association not to leave a moment of their work for women and continue gaining women's rights.

Eskandari died in July 1924, when she was 29 years old. Her death brought sorrow and sadness among those who distinguished and worked with her.

Sediqeh Dowlatabadi wrote in the deed of Mohtaram:

The late incident of losing Mohtaram Eskandari, has depressed me so much that I cannot explain it, because I know the great efforts of this brave Iranian girl and I conceive her loss as a great misfortune. Yes, her sacrifices were admirable. I will never forget that they repeatedly condemned her at the conferences. But she listened to everything and tried not to get herself distraught or upset. With steady steps and determination, she continued her goals. In my life, she was the first Iranian woman I have seen who never got tired of doing all she can to reach the goal she had in mind. I just hope that all the women of my homeland do not let the work of this respectable woman go away and that the foundation she had established will not break.

== See also ==
- Iranian women
- Persian Constitutional Revolution
- Women's rights movement in Iran
- Women's rights in Iran

== Sources ==
- Sanasarian, Eliz. The Women's Rights Movements in Iran, Praeger, New York: 1982, ISBN 0-03-059632-7.
- Nahid, Abdolhossein, Iranian Women in the Constitutional Movement, Tabriz, published by Ehya, 1981.
- Pouran Farokhzad, Iranian Women's Carnivals (From yesterday to today). Tehran, published by Ghatreh, 2002.
- Yervand Abrahamian, Iran between Two Revolutions: From Constitutionalism to Islamic Revolution. Translation by Kazem Firuzmand, Hasan Shamsiyahi, Mohsen the Director of Shanachi. Second print, published by Markaz, 1999, page 146.
