= Constitutional Revolution's Associations =

Iranian political communities

The associations of the Iranian Constitutional Revolution (Persian: انجمن‌های جنبش مشروطه) are a number of political and state communities that not were the official initiators of the civil society participation in Iran and played a key role in the victory of the Constitutional Revolution and the formation of subsequent parties.

== Introduction ==
At the end of Naser al-Din Shah Qajar's reign, and in the early days of Mozaffar ad-Din Shah Qajar, a number of intellectuals and a group of government agents associated with the European countries, who considered Iran's political and social outcomes in the absence of law and respect for individual freedoms, gradually began to rumor and talk about reforms.

The reform was based on three amendments of law, civil law, reforming the court system, and preventing foreign intervention.

== Primary core ==
Sayyid Jamāl al-Dīn al-Afghānī may be one of the forerunners of the popular reformist campaigns. Although his efforts were mostly to keep the rulers awake, his thoughts in founding the associations were not affected.

Mirza Malkam Khan Nazem Al- Doleh was known as the founder of the first core of the associations by establishing Faramosh Khaneh and then forming the Adamiat Association (called the Hizbullah Group).

The Reji Agreement and the tobacco boycott were part of a popular upsurge and the formation of the first cores of the associations. The Tobacco Protest Contract is one of the main reasons for gathering the people and also helps to the formation of organizations.

== Type of activity ==
The associations during the Constitutional Revolution were divided into political, state, religious, literary, and regional according to their statute. But the developments in the country were such that almost all of them were active in pursuit of political and social demands. Some of the associations had secret activities before the constitutional victory, but, their activities, statutes, and members' names were not mentioned publicly.

== Political associations ==
At the time of the incident in the Toopkhaneh Square, and before the artillery of the parliament, more than 48 associations were active in Tehran.

The number of state and political associations in the country reached to more than 100 associations, and state associations also intervened in political and social activities.

== Agree to constitutionalism ==
=== The secret association ===
The secret association was founded in the year 1904 by Mirza Sayyed Mohammad Tabatabai. His goal was to promote the people and familiarize them with political rights. Gradually, some rapid methods were adopted and made some of the members to withdrawal from the association.

The members were called and known as "Fada'i". They joined to bring justice for the courthouse and the parliament. Sayyed Mohammad Tabatabai, Nazem al-salam Kermani, Mirza Agha Isfahani, and Majd al-Islam Kermani were the members of the association.

=== The association of Baghe Mekideh ===
The Baghe Mekideh Association was secretly established in Muharram 1322 by some libertarians and reformists. Like the Secret Association, it had a revolutionary nature. The main members of the association were Malek al-Motekalemin - Mirza Jahangir Khan (Sūr-e-Esrāfil) - Seyyed Mohammad Reza Masavat Shirazi - Sayyid Jamal al-Din Va'iz Esfahani - Yahya Dolatabadi -Hajj Sayyah - Ali Akbar Saatsaz - Soleiman Khan Mekdeh and many others. It had more than 60 members.

The association also had a committee called the Revolutionary Committee. They co-operated with Haydar Khan Amo-oghli's group. A person named, Abbas Aqa Tabrizi was a member of the committee who later murdered and killed Mirza Ali Asghar Khan Atabak (Amin al-Sultan).

==== Key members of the Baghe Mekideh Association ====
Among the members of the association were people such as Sheikh Mohammad Mehdi Sharif Kashani, Malek Al-MoteKalemin, Seyyed Jamal Vaez, Seyyed Mohammad Reza Masavat, Seyyed Asadollah Kharaghani, Sheikh Mehdi Bahar al-Olum Kermani, Abolhasan Mirza Qajar - Aqa Mirza Mohsen (Sadr al-Ulama's brother) - Soleiman Khan Mekideh - Yahya Dolatabadi - Mohammad Ali Khan Nusrat al-Sultan - Jahangir Khan Soor al-Esrafil, Mirza Abbas Ali Khan Shokat, Hamed al-Molk Shirazi, Mirza Mahmoud Shirazi, Haj Mirza Ali Mohammad Dolatabadi, and ......

Some of them were among the relative of the Subh-i-Azal (Morning of Eternity), and some in the past went to Cyprus and met with their leader.

Mehdi Malekzadeh named Sheikh Mohammad Mehdi Sharif Kashani as the chairman of the Baghe Mekideh Association.

=== Isfahan National Holy Association ===
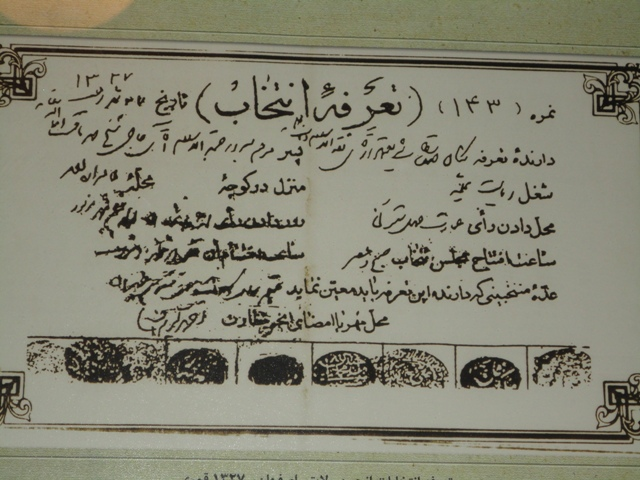
Anjoman Moghadas, Isfahan

The Isfahan Seminary or Isfahan National Holy Association (1946–1948) was the main political and decision-making body of Isfahan during the first constitutional Revolution.

The members of the council was elected by the people of Isfahan and Haj Aqa Nourollah Isfahani was chosen as the chairman of the council. This association was formed between the years 1946 to 1948, from the migration of Qom to the artillery of the parliament in ChehelSotoun Isfahan.

=== Tabriz Association ===
In 1945, the association was formed in Tabriz, following the consent of Mohammad Ali Shah, for establishing the constitution and the withdrawal of the infidels from the British Consulate and was formed. The association initially had 20 members and they were also the leaders of the Revolution. A group of the Social Democratic Party of Ghafghaz, such as Haydar Khan Amo-oghli and Ali Moosio, also cooperated with the association. The Tabriz Secret Center was one of the subcommittees of the association and it was founded with the help and cooperation of the Ghafghaz Group.

After the law of the state and provincial associations in the National Assembly was adopted, its name was changed to the State Association of Azerbaijan. Following the opposition of Mohammad Ali Mirza with the parliament and the incident that happened at the Toopkhaneh Square, the Association, by sending telegrams to other cities, called for the ruler's removal from the kingdom, which prompted Mohammad Ali Shah's withdrawal from his position.

After the bombing of the parliament, the Tabriz Association virtually assumed the role of the National Assembly and sent verdicts to the cities.

At that time, the Neda Mellat Newspaper was published, which later was printed in the name of Nalleyeh Mellat, and reprinted the Association's newspaper.

=== Other pro-parliamentary associations ===
- Associations such as Azerbaijan, Shah Abad, Mozaffari, Talab, Central, Asnaf, and, the Brothers of the Ghazvin Gate were the most active and powerful associations that armed and confronted the artillery and blockade arenas of the parliament.
- The Brothers of the Government Gate
- Central headed by Arshad al-Doleh
- The Hidden Sani Association was founded in the year 1945 by Seyyed Mohammad Tabataba'i
- Mokhadarat Vatan
- Jam'iyat-e Nesvan-e Vatankhah
- Fatemieh
- Student Union
- Mohammadieh Baharestan
- Ferdosieh
- Ansar

=== Associations of the city ===
In addition to the state and provincial associations established in the cities, in Tehran, several associations were also active.

- Associations such as the Republic of Azerbaijan, Esfahaniha, South, Shiraz, Hamedan Union, and the Humanity Assembly.

== Disagreement to the constitutionalism ==
- Tabriz Islamia Society, which was founded by Mir Hashemi Doutchi.
- The Khedmat Association was established by Ala al-Doleh and a number of activists and courtiers to deal with pro-parliamentary associations.
- The Association of Varamin which was founded by Akbar al-Doleh.
- The Association of Fotoot was founded by Zafar al-Saltanah and the Khoy City's Friday's Prayer's Imam.
- The Association of Sanglaj and Islamiyah of Tehran was founded by Mirza Abolqasem, the son of Seyyed Mohammad Tabataba'i.
- Ale Mohammad Association
- Hemat Abad Association
- Elahi Association
- Saadat Tabriz Association

== See also ==
- Iranian Constitutional Revolution
- Women's Freedom Association
- Women in Constitutional Revolution
- Secularism in Iran
- Women's World (Iranian magazine)
