= Kanoun-e-Banovan =

Iranian women's rights organization

Kanoun-e-Banovan (Persian: کانون بانوان, romanized: Kānun-e Bānovān; lit. 'Ladies' Center') was an Iranian women's rights organization, founded on 14 October 1935. It played an important part in the Kashf-e hijab reform against compulsory hijab (veiling).

== History ==
In 1932, the Second Eastern Women's Congress was organized by the leading women's rights organization Jam'iyat-e Nesvan-e Vatankhah with state support. After the Congress was over, however, the organization was dissolved. The Iranian royal regime wished to support women's rights, since it was regarded as a vital part of their modernization program; however, it wanted to have control over the women's movement.

In 1935, minister Ali-Asghar Hekmat called upon the leading veteran women's rights activists of the Iranian women's rights movement and offered them to start a new women's rights organization with state support, and they accepted the offer. Hajar Tarbiat became the President of the organization, and a number of prominent feminists became members of the organization, among them Badr al-Maluk Bamdad, Khadijeh Afzal Vaziri and Sediqeh Dowlatabadi, Farrokhroo Parsa and Parvin E'tesami.

The organization launched a campaign against the Islamic veil, and promoted its abolition. This campaign prepared the ground for the abolition of veiling which was being prepared by the royal government. In 1934, the regime had already banned the veil among female teachers in girls' school, and in 1935, female students were encouraged to unveil. The same year, the Kanoun-e-Banovan was founded with state support and campaigned for unveiling. The members of the organization, consisting mainly of educated middle and upper class women, already supported unveiling, and its members attended at their meetings unveiled. When the regime finally launched the public unveiling and abolition of the veil through the Kashf-e hijab reform in 1936, the Kanoun-e-Banovan participated as one of its more public supporters of the reform.

In 1937, it was transformed in to an institute for welfare and social services. Kanoun-e-Banovan played an important role in incorporating the Iranian women's movement in to the Iranian state and securing its continuing existence during the Pahlavi era. In 1959, all Iranian women's groups were formally incorporated in to the High Council of Women's Organizations of Iran, from 1966 known as the Women's Organization of Iran, who managed the state feminism supported as women's policy during the Pahlavi era.

== See also ==
- Sade Giyinen Hanımlar Cemiyeti
