= Noor-ol-Hoda Mangeneh =

Iranian feminist activist (1902–1986)

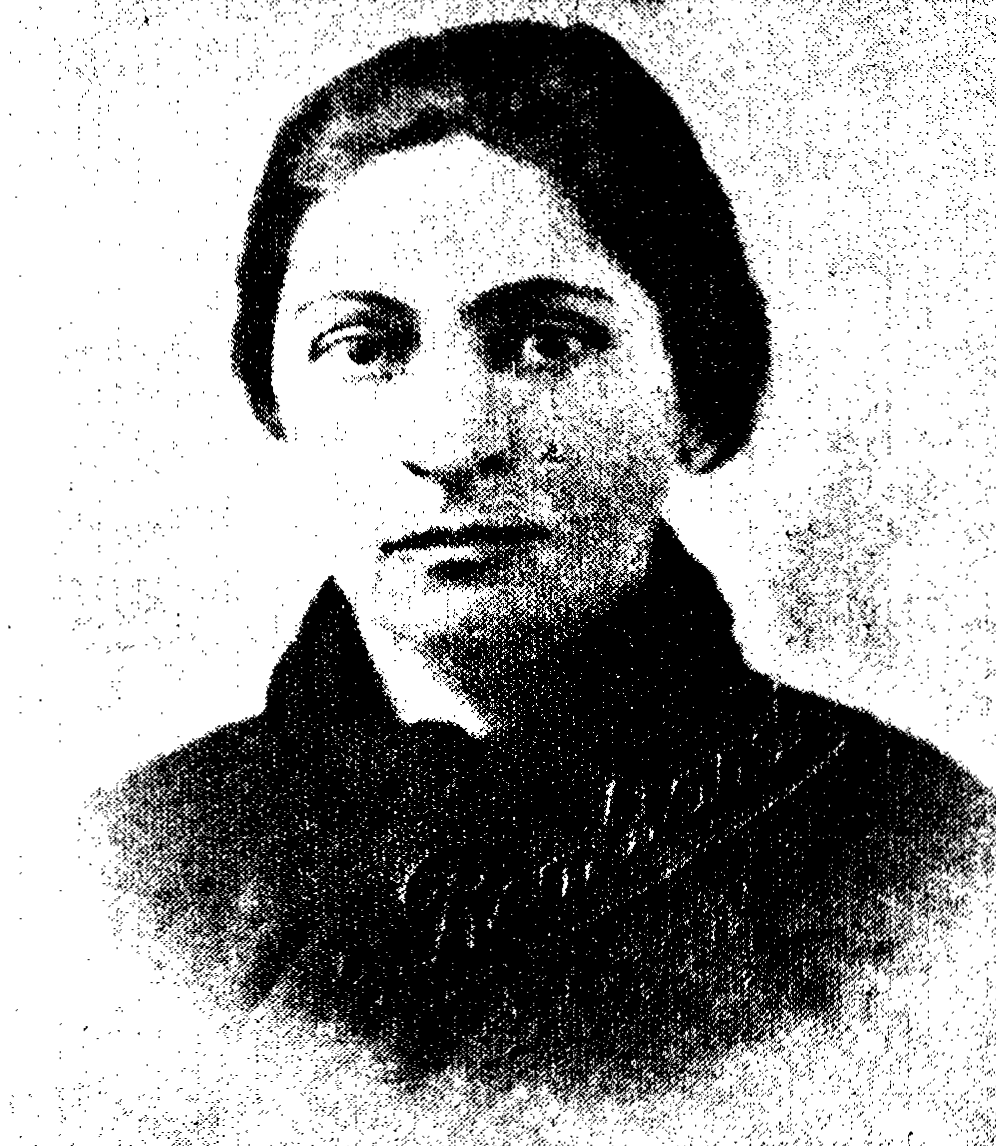
Noor-ol-Hoda Mangeneh

Noor-ol-Hoda Mangeneh (Persian: نورالهدی منگنه; 1902–1986) was an Iranian intellectual and one of the pioneering figures in the women's rights movement in Iran. She was born in Tehran. She was a member of Jam'iyat-e Nesvan-e Vatankhah ("Patriotic Women's League of Iran") and published Bibi magazine for women.
