= Jam'iyat-e Nesvan-e Vatankhah =

Iranian women's rights organization

Society of Patriotic Women
- جمعیت نسوان وطنخواه
- Successor: Kanoun-e-Banovan
- Formation: 1922
- Dissolved: 1933
- Type: Women's rights organization

Jam'iyat-e Nesvân-e Vatankhâh (Persian: جمعیت نسوان وطنخواه, lit. 'Society of Patriotic Women or Patriotic Women's League of Iran') active from 1922 to 1933, was one of the most effective organizations in the Women's rights movement in Iran that formed after the Persian Constitutional Revolution.

== History ==
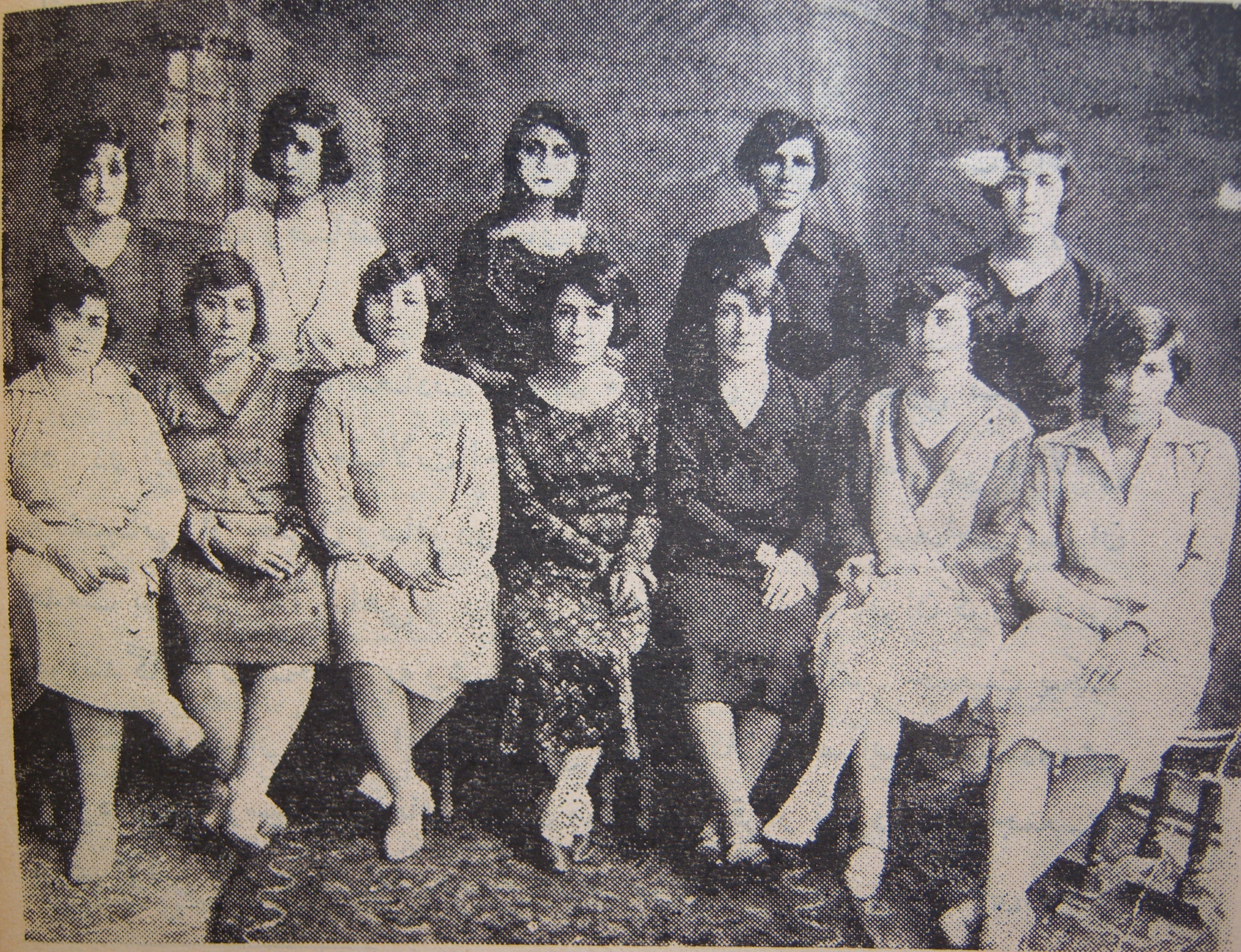
Board of Governors of Jam'iyat-e Nesvan-e Vatankhah [Association of Patriotic Women], Tehran, 1922–1932

The Society was set up in 1922 under the name, Jamʿīyat-e taraqqī-e neswān, by Mohtaram Eskandari, director of the state school number 5 for girls, who was disappointed with the results of the revolution for women, Noor-ol-Hoda Mangeneh, Mastoureh Afshar, and other women's rights activists.

Board of Governors (see photo right): left to right sitting: Fakhr Afāgh Pārsā (mother of Farrokhrou Pārsā), Molouk Eskandari (Mohtaram Eskandari), Kobrā Chanāni, Mastoureh Afshār, Nosrat Moshiri, Safiyyeh Eskandari, Esmat ol-Molouk Sharifi. Standing: Mehr'angiz Eskandari, Banu Chanāni, Haiedeh Afshār, Abbaseh Pāyvar, Ghodsiyyeh Moshiri.

Their objective was "to emphasize [the] continuous respect for the laws and rituals of Islam; to promote the education and moral upbringing of girls; to encourage national industries; to spread literacy among adult women; to provide care for orphaned girls; to set up hospitals for poor women; to organise co-operatives as a means of developing national industries; and to give material and moral support to the defenders of the country in the event of war." The organization contributed "the most important recorded effort to establish ties with women of the region."

The league held lectures and waged campaigns. The league also published the important women's journal, Nosvan Vatankhah [Patriotic women], from 1922.

Following Eskandari's death in 1925, Mastoureh Afshar, assumed Eskandari's role as the League’s president with the support of prominent figures such as Nur-al-Hoda Mangana, Homa Mahmudi, Fakhr-Ozma Arghun, Sadiqa Dawlatabadi, and Fakr Afaq Parsa. In 1925, there were 74 members in the league.

In 1932, it organized the Oriental Women's Congress in Tehran. When the Congress was over, the organization was however dissolved. It was succeeded by Kanoun-e-Banovan in 1935.

=== Nesvan–e Vatankhah magazine ===
In the year 1922, the Patriotic Women’s Association was established with the esteemed work of Mohtaram Eskandari, Nurolhouda Mangeneh, Mastureh Afshar and Madam Fakhr Afagh. The right of education for women was one of the most important goals of this association.

With ten elected women, the board of directors was formed by the Patriotic Women's Association, and the same delegation elected Eskandari as the first head of the community.

The association "Patriotic Women", on the path to the goals of women's education and learning, published the magazine Nesvan–e Vatankhah (Persian: The Patriotic Women), in the wake of the launch of classes for older women. The newspaper was the official organ of the community that focused on women's issues and women's rights. The owner of the magazine was Madam Molouk Eskandari and her first respected director was Mohtaram Eskandari. The Nasvan Watan Khaw Newspaper published eleven issues over three years (from 1923 to 1926) and attracted many liberal women.

== See also ==
- Iranian Constitutional Revolution
- Women's Freedom Association
- Women's Movement in Iran
- Mokhadarat Vatan Association
- Iranian women
- Constitutional Revolution's Associations
- Majma'-e Enghelabi-ye Nesvan
