= Women's rights movement in Iran =

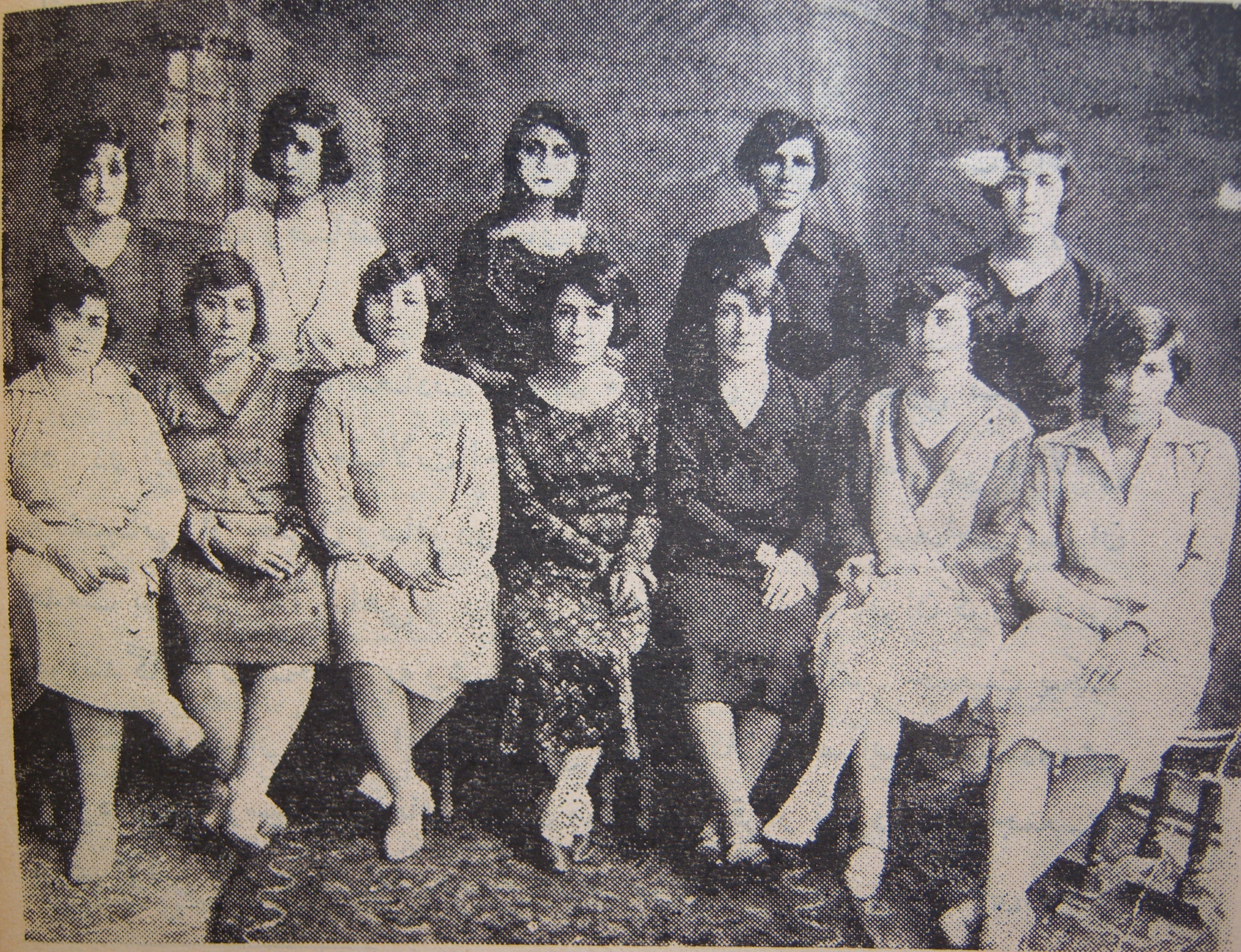
The board of directors of "Jam'iat e nesvan e vatan-khah", a women's rights association in Tehran (1923–1933)

The Iranian Women's Rights Movement (Persian: جنبش زنان ایران), is the social movement for women's rights of the women in Iran. The movement first emerged after the Iranian Constitutional Revolution in 1910, the year in which the first women's periodical was published by women. The movement lasted until 1933 when the last women's association was dissolved by the government of Reza Shah Pahlavi. It rose again after the Iranian Revolution in 1979.

Between 1963 and 1979, the Iranian Women's Movement gained victories such as the right for women to vote in 1963, a part of Mohammad Reza Shah's White Revolution. Women were also allowed to take part in public office, and in 1975 the Family Protection Law provided new rights for women, including expanded divorce and custody rights and reduced polygamy. Since the Islamic Revolution of 1979, women's rights have been restricted, and several laws were established such as the introduction of mandatory veiling and a public dress code for women. In 2016, only 6% of Iranian parliament members were women, while the global average was about 23%.

The Women's Rights Movement in Iran continues to push for reforms, particularly with the One Million Signatures Campaign to End Discrimination Against Women.

== After the Constitutional Revolution ==
The Iranian Constitutional Revolution took place between 1905 and 1911. The early cores of consciousness of women's rights (or rather lack of rights) which led to establishment of societies and magazines started shortly after. The low status of women and the secret operation of many of their organizations and societies, have limited the amount of information on the subject. Women's writing in that era, mainly appearing in newspapers and periodicals, are one of the most valuable sources of information on the movement. Most important of these periodicals are listed below.

Additionally, Iranian women were aware of women's conditions and educational opportunities elsewhere and were inspired by them.

=== Education ===
Women activists determined that education was central to their cause. The argument they put forward was that providing women with education was an overall good for Iran, allowing mothers to raise better children for their country. At the beginning of the century, foreign missionaries founded the first school for girls, which was attended mostly by religious minorities. Haji-Mirza Hassan Roshdieh and Bibi Khanoom Astarabadi later also founded schools for girls, but both were quickly closed. Eventually, in 1918, after years of private and unregulated schools, the government provided funds to establish ten primary schools for girls and a teacher training college. From 1914 to 1925, women's publications expanded beyond discussions of education, addressing subjects such as child marriage, economic and social empowerment, and the rights and legal status of women.

=== Societies and organizations ===
In 1906, despite the parliament refusing their request, women established several organizations, including the "Society for Women's Freedom", which met in secret until it was discovered and attacked. The Jam'iat e nesvan e vatan-khah (Patriotic Women's League) was founded approximately around 1918; it published Nosvan Vatankhah.

In 1922, Mohtaram Eskandari created the "Patriotic Women's Organization". She was arrested and her house was burned. Zandokht Shirazi, another women activist, organized the "Women's Revolutionary Association". During this early phase of the women's movement, women who became involved were typically the daughters, sisters and wives of well-known constitutionalists. Generally, they were from educated, middle-class families. The low status of women and the secret operation of many of their organizations and societies have somewhat limited the amount of information on the subject.

=== Early publications ===
Women's writing in that era, mainly found in newspapers and periodicals, are one of the most valuable sources of information on the movement. Some of the most important periodicals of that era are listed below (the year of publication of the first issue is mentioned in parentheses, sometimes with the city of publication):

- Danesh (Knowledge, 1910) was the first weekly magazine, founded by a women's society, with a female editor; it was published by a doctor's wife and written for women.
- Shekoofeh (Blossom, 1913) was edited by a woman, Mariam Mozayen-ol Sadat. Its primary goal was the education of women against superstition and acquainting them with world literature.
- Zaban-e Zanan (Women's voice, 1919 in Isfahan), was one of the more hardcore publications, founded and edited by Sediqeh Dowlatabadi in 1919 in Isfahan. It was one of the harshest critics of veiling (hijab).
- Nameh-e Banuvan (Women's letter, created in 1921 and edited by Shahnaz Azad, was another critic of veiling. The purpose of the magazine, as stated below its title, was "awakening of the suffering Iranian Women".
- Peyk-e Saadat Nesvan (Women's Wellness, 1927 in Rasht), was published by the Peyk-e Saadat Nesvan Society. It was one of the first leftist journals in Iran. Roshanak Nodust (1894–1959) was one of its founders.
- Alam Nesvan (Women's Universe, 1920 in Tehran), was published by Association of Graduates of Tehran's American Girls' School. This magazine had a more informative than political tone, at least initially. Over time it became more critical and outspoken. It was a particularly Western-oriented paper. Alam Nesvan was one of the longer-lasting publications on women's issues. Its relative long survival (14 years) might have been due to its association with the above-mentioned school.
- Jahan Zanan (Women's World, 1921, initially in Mashhad), was published by Afaq Parsa. Despite its relatively moderate tone, the editor faced severe vindictiveness and animosity from local conservatives.
- Nosvan Vatankhah (Patriotic Women, 1922), published by Jamiat Nesvan Vatankhah Iran (Patriotic Women's League of Iran or Society of Patriotic Women) was a major advocate of women's rights. The publisher was Mohtaram Eskandari.
- Dokhtran Iran (Daughters of Iran, 1931 initially in Shiraz) was a newspaper published by Zandokht Shirazi, a prominent feminist, poet and school teacher, who was an activist from an early age.
- Jam'iyat-e nesvan by Molouk Eskandiari.

== Reza Pahlavi era (1925–1941) ==
Women's first strides were in education: in 1928, they were provided with financial support to study abroad; in 1935 they were admitted to Tehran University, and in 1944 education became compulsory. In 1932, the Second Congress of Women of the East was organized in Tehran, and Iranian women activists met with activists from Lebanon, Egypt, India and Iraq. Dowlatabadi was the secretary. In 1936, Reza Shah Pahlavi set the mandatory unveiling of women known as Kashf-e hijab – a highly controversial policy which caused many conservative women to simply stay inside the house rather than go out in a veil and be subjected to harassment from the police, but also caused desegregation in some sectors of society. The reform was supported by many of the leading women's rights activists, who campaigned for it via the women's organisation Kanoun-e-Banovan.

== Mohammad Reza Pahlavi era (1941–1979) ==
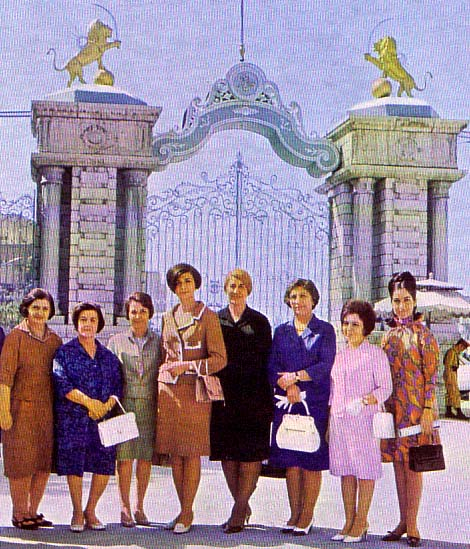
Women Parliamentarians of Iran in front of the gate of the Iranian Parliament (Baharestan), mid 1970s

The 1940s saw a heightened consciousness of the role of women in society; and the 1950s the birth of numerous women's rights organizations, among which Rah-e Now (New Path) founded by Mehrangiz Dowlatshahi in 1955, and Women's League of Supporters of the Declaration of Human Rights founded by Safieh Firouz in 1956. In 1959 fifteen of those organizations formed a federation called the High Council of Women's Organizations in Iran. The High Council decided to concentrate its efforts on women's suffrage.

Despite much opposition by clerics, the suffrage was gained in 1963 when a national referendum reflected general support for the 6-point reform program known as the White Revolution which included women's right to vote and to stand for public office. Six women were elected to Parliament (Majlis). In the late 1960s, women entered the diplomatic corps, the judiciary and police force, and the revolutionary service corps (education, health and development): in 1968, Farrokhroo Parsa became Minister of Education. She was the first woman to hold a cabinet position; in 1969 the judiciary was opened to women and five female judges were appointed, including future Nobel prize winner Shirin Ebadi. Women were elected to town, city and county councils.

Looking for a way to achieve a more viable organization structure for women's activities, a coalition of women's groups forms the Women's Organization of Iran in 1966.

=== The Women's Organization of Iran ===
Though the WOI was patroned by Princess Ashraf (the Shah's twin sister), Iranian women and the WOI had to fight for every improvement in their lives. The Women's Organization of Iran was a non-profit grassroots organization working mainly through volunteers. Its goals were to encourage women's education for change, to work towards securing economic independence for women, and at the same time to remain within the spirit of Islam and the cultural traditions of the nation. It worked through local branches and Women's Centers, which provided useful services for women – literacy classes, vocational training, counseling, sports and cultural activities and childcare.

One of the major victories of the WOI was the Family Protection Law of 1975. It granted women equal rights in marriage and divorce, enhanced women's rights in child custody, increased the minimum age of marriage to 18 for women and 20 for men, and practically eliminated polygamy.

Abortion was also made legal without arousing much public attention, by removing the penalty for performing the operation embodied in a law dealing with medical malpractice. All labor laws and regulations were revised to eliminate sex discrimination and incorporate equal pay for equal work. Women were encouraged to run for political office.

By 1978 nearly 40% of girls six and above were literate; over 12,000 literacy corps women were teaching in villages; 33% of university students were women, and more women than men took the entrance exam for the school of medicine. 333 women were elected to local councils, 22 women were elected to parliament, and 2 served in the Senate. There were one cabinet minister (for women's affairs), 3 sub-cabinet under-secretaries, one governor, an ambassador, and five women mayors.

Iran has also established itself as playing a leading role for women's rights among developing countries, introducing ideas and funds for the UN Regional Center for Research and Development for Asia and the Pacific, and the International Center for Research on Women.

== After Islamic Revolution ==
After the Iranian Revolution in February 1979, the status of women changed substantially. The massive participation of women in the 1978–79 revolution was in part a result of the mobilization efforts of women's organization in the preceding decades, including the WOI's activities in the late 1960s and 70s during which women had gained consciousness of their own collective political power, and understood the need for women to assert themselves. Women marched in support of a freer, more egalitarian government. With passage of time, some of the rights that women had gained under Shah, were systematically removed, through legislation, such as the forced wearing of the hijab, particularly the chador. Soon after the revolution, there were rumors of plans for forced hijab, and abolition of some women's rights protected by "Family protection act" conceived to be "against Islam". The rumors were denied by some state officials and many women refused to accept it. Not long after, however, the rumors were realized.

A new family law was annulled, and veiling became obligatory. Farrokhrou Parsa, the first woman to serve in the Iranian cabinet, was executed.

The veiling law was met with protests comprising heterogeneous groups of women. The demonstrations did not aim to expand women's rights in Iran, but simply to keep what they had already earned. There were three major collective attempts to voice concerns:

1. A five-day demonstration starting on March 8, 1979
2. The Conference of Unity of Women in December 1979
3. Demonstrations after the Ayatollah Khomeini's decree on eliminating any symbol or practice reminiscent of the Shah's rule. A consequence of that decree was forced hijab.

These collective attempts, as well as the smaller ones, not only faced opposition from the Islamic conservatives, but were sometimes damaged by the leftist political groups, exemplified by the organization of a demonstration scheduled by the Fedai for the same day as that of the Conference of Unity of Women in December 1979 – despite the pleas mentioned above. In fact, most leftist groups did not have a well-established vision or plan for pursuing women's rights. The status of women, it was presumed, would be improved automatically by the establishment of an ideal socialist/communist society.

Aspects of Islamic law pertaining to women can be seen in Articles 20 and 21 of the 1979 constitution, and two manifestations of Islamic law are now infamous among women's rights activists: stoning and polygamy, to name two.

At the beginning of the Islamic revolution, some of the leaders of the women's rights, were discredited.

=== Twenty-first century activism ===
For the first time since the revolution, several women succeeded in 1997 in getting into a stadium to watch a soccer match. Female legal consultants have been introduced in special family courts.

One Million Signatures for the Repeal of Discriminatory Laws notable campaign was launched in 2006 to collect one million signatures in support of changing discriminatory laws against women in Iran and reforming of family laws, to ask Parliament for the revision and reform of current laws which discriminate against women. Another campaign was 'Stop Stoning Forever'.

However, the active participation of many women in the revolution helped awaken many women about their political potential, and many middle-class women acted increasingly to support women's rights. Increasing vocal opposition to policies which sanctioned polygamy, temporary marriage, free divorce for men, and child custody to fathers also took hold. A growing trend of women began to interpret Islam in more gender-egalitarian ways with the entry of more women in the public sphere and limitation of discourse to Islamic parameters. Growing activism and publicity brought some legal remedies to the women's struggle for example limits on a husband's right to prevent his wife from taking a job, and a new marriage contract which gave women the right to divorce. Judges became more sympathetic to women's issues because of the hardship, and when some reforms did not make it through the legislative process, the government tried to ameliorate some of the injustices and gave instructions to the courts on how to do so.

As more Iranian girls were being educated in the 1980s, and the government opened higher religious education to women, some mastered technical forms of Islamic argumentation which helped in the fight for the liberalization of women's rights. Furthermore, many women became successful entrepreneurs, and worked in other highly visible professions including parliament. As stated in an interview in 1996, prominent secular lawyer Mehrangiz Kar stated “The revolution gave women confidence in themselves. With all the sacrifices they made, Iranian women know how much their current and future rulers owe to them. This demand is no longer that of a group of women; it is a nationwide one. The Islamic government cannot escape it without risking a brutal separation of the state and religion.”

==== Death of Mahsa Amini ====
The death of Mahsa Amini took place at the hands of the Iranian Guidance Patrol. Amini was arrested for violating the country's hijab law. She was beaten severely by the police, while in custody and died in the hospital on September 16, 2022. Her death started a series of protests in Iran, which resulted in the hundreds of deaths and thousands of arrests.

==== Women's Cultural Centre ====
The Women's Cultural Centre is an organization founded in the 1990s by Noushin Ahmadi Khorasani and Parvin Ardalan and has been a center for forming opinions, analyzing and documenting women's issues in Iran. Since 2005, the organization has published Iran's first online magazine on women's rights, Zanestan, with Ardalan as its editor. In its constant struggle against censorship – the magazine comes back with a new name all the time – the newspaper has dealt with marriage, prostitution, education, AIDS, and violence against women.

==== Zanan magazine ====
Zanan was a monthly women's magazine published in Iran, founded in 1992. It was the only Persian women's magazine in the country. The magazine ceased publication in 2008, but was relaunched on 29 May 2014. In September 2014, its founder and editor Shahla Sherkat was charged in Iran's Press Court (part of the Islamic Revolutionary Court) for promoting un-Islamic and "obsolete" views and in April 2015, publication of the magazine was again suspended. Zanan focused on the concerns of Iranian women with an Islamic point of view and had intentions of protecting and promoting their rights. However, the monthly magazine tested the political waters with its coverage of reform politics, domestic abuse, and sex. Article topics covered controversial issues from domestic abuse to plastic surgery. It argued that gender equality was Islamic and that religious literature had been misread and misappropriated by misogynists. Mehangiz Kar, Shahla Lahiji, and Shahla Sherkat, the editors of Zanan, led the debate on women's rights and demanded reforms. The leadership did not respond but, for the first time since the revolution, did not silence the movement.

==== Iranian Women's Movement Museum (IRWMM) ====
The Iranian Women's Movement Museum (IRWMM) was founded in 2008. Based in Iran, it collects information to document Iranian women's social, cultural, political, scientific, artistic, and athletic history and efforts, starting with the Constitutional Movement. Its collection is online only in bilingual presentation, and the museum also presents a traveling exhibition in other countries. It is a member of The International Association of Women's Museums.

==== One Million Signatures ====
One Million Signatures for the Repeal of Discriminatory Laws, also known as Change for Equality, is a campaign by women in Iran to collect one million signatures in support of changing discriminatory laws against women in their country. The campaign seeks to secure equal rights in marriage and inheritance, an end to polygamy, and stricter punishments for honour killings and other forms of violence. It was founded in late August 2006 on Tehran by Noushin Ahmadi Khorasani and Parvin Ardalan who were imprisoned in sentenced to three years in prison for "threatening the national security".

Activists of the movement have been attacked and jailed by the government, and the campaign has had to extend its two-year target to collect the full number of signatures.

==== My Stealthy Freedom ====
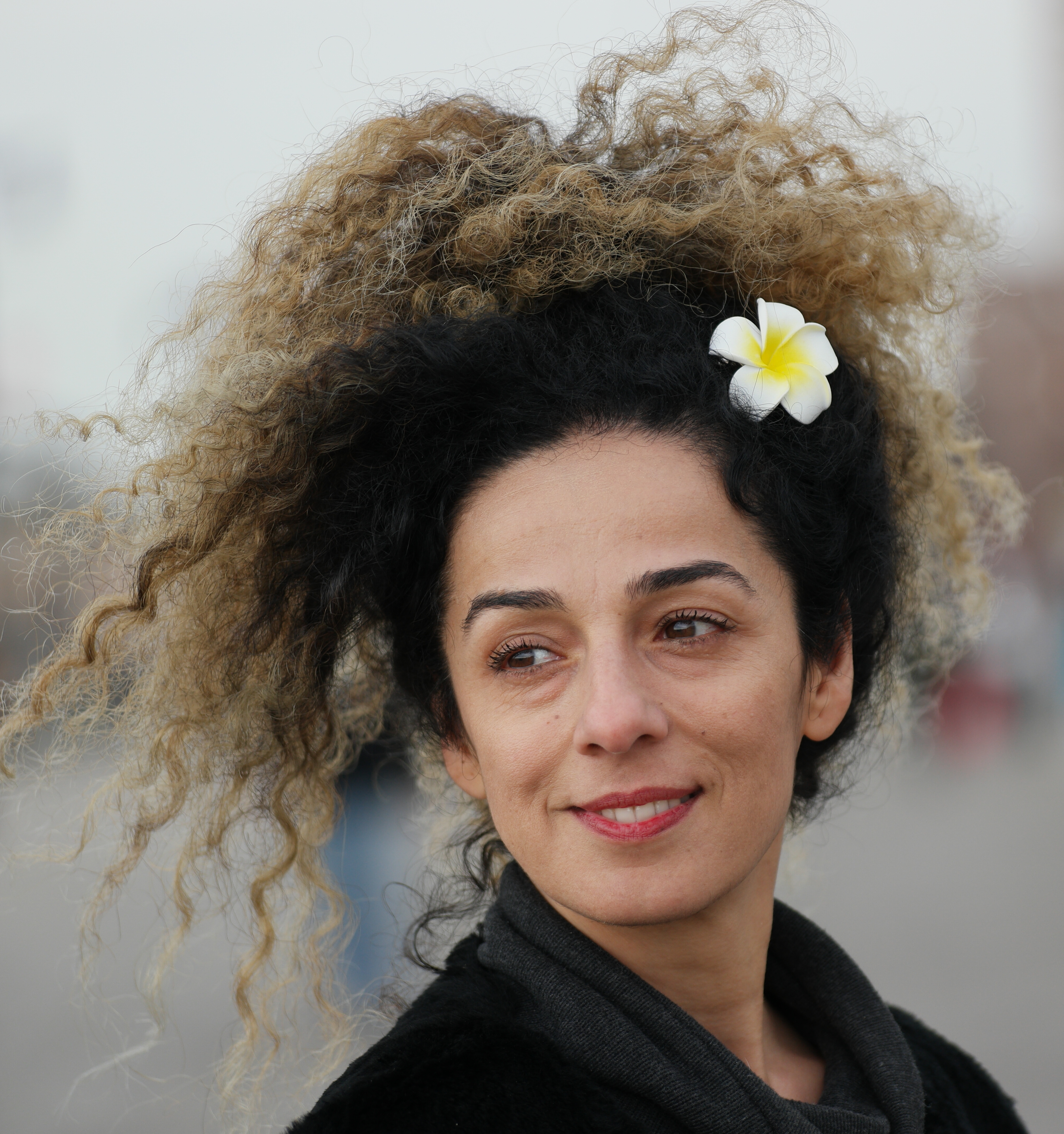
Masih Alinejad

My Stealthy Freedom is an online movement that was commenced in 2014 by Masih Alinejad, an Iranian-born journalist and activist based in the United Kingdom and the United States. This movement started from a Facebook page My Stealthy Freedom where women from Iran post their photos without scarfs, and by the end of 2016 page has surpassed 1 million Facebook likes. Initiative has received wide international and national coverage, Hopes were high that the re-election of Iranian President Hassan Rouhani would see the abolishment of the compulsory hijab law, which has never happened. To this end, Alinejad launched "White Wednesdays", where women protest the law by wearing white veils on Wednesdays (men, in solidarity, tie white ribbons around their wrists).

== Iranian feminism ==
Iranian feminists generally fall into two camps when it comes to the women's rights movement in Iran, post 1979. Some believe that Islamization has resulted in the "marginalizing" of women. Others believe that through the dynamic nature of Islamic law, known as Sharia, a unique consciousness of feminism has been formed in Iran. Both these views have been challenged.

Among the women's rights activists in Iran, feminism means different things. A major contrast is seen between secular feminists and those who are dubbed Islamic feminists, on the nature of feminism.

Islamic feminists, or more accurately Muslim feminists, are women rights advocates who seek to improve the status of women through more favorable interpretations of Islamic law, supporting what is called "Dynamic Interpretation" (Feqh-e pouya in Persian). Some Muslim feminists prefer the term "indigenous feminists" (feminist-e boomi).

Despite the disagreements among different factions, when it comes to the improvement of women's conditions, feminist groups have shown that they can cooperate with an emphasis on common ground. The chief editor of Zanan magazine, Shahla Sherkat, for example, a woman with definite religious beliefs, invited prominent Muslim women rights activist Shirin Ebadi, and prominent secular women rights activist Mehrangiz Kar, to write on women's issues in her magazine. These activists have also taken advantage of new technologies in their efforts for women's rights; Mehrangiz Kar, for example, has taught classes and written manuals on women's rights defense for Tavaana: E-Learning Institute for Iranian Civil Society.

=== Women's studies in Iran ===
Through the efforts of women's rights advocates in Iran, in 2001 Allameh Tabatabaii University, Tarbiat Modares University, and Alzahra University initiated women's studies programs at the Master of Arts level, and shortly thereafter Tehran University began a similar university course for a degree. There are three sub-specialties: women and family, the history of women, and women's rights in Islam. These programs are needed, it is stated, to try and remedy some of the damage caused by centuries of the dominance of negative views on women, sociologically and humanistically, and other hardships suffered by women in Iran. It is hoped that graduates of women's studies programs will be able to present gender-neutral points of view.

Some of the most notable activists are:

- Táhirih also called Qurratu l-ʿAyn, Fatimah Baraghani (1814 or 1817 – August 16–27, 1852)
- Zahra Khanom Tadj es-Saltaneh (daughter of Naser al-Din Shah) (1883–1936)
- Bibi Khanoom Astarabadi (1859–1921)
- Tuba Azmudeh (1878–1936)
- Sediqeh Dowlatabadi (1882–1962)
- Mohtaram Eskandari (1895–1924)
- FakhrAfagh Parsa (1898–?)
- Roshank No'doost (1899–?)
- Fakhr-Ozma Arghun (1899–1966)
- Shahnaz Azad (1901–1961)
- Noor-ol-Hoda Mangeneh (1902–?)
- Zandokht Shirazi (1909–1953)
- Maryam Amid (Mariam Mozayen-ol Sadat) (?–1919)
- Farrokhroo Parsa (1922–1980)
- Mahnaz Afkhami (b. 1941)
- Mehrangiz Kar (b. 1944)
- Azam Taleghani (1944–2019)
- Zahra Rahnavard (b. 1945)
- Fatemeh Karroubi (b. 1949)
- Shahla Sherkat (b. 1956)
- Mahboubeh Abbasgholizadeh (b. 1958)
- Roya Toloui (b. 1966)
- Parvin Ardalan (b. 1967)
- Noushin Ahmadi Khorasani (b. 1970)
- Sheema Kalbasi (b. 1972)
- Golbarg Bashi (b. 1974)
- Shadi Sadr (b. 1974)
- Atena Farghadani (b. 1987)
- Faezeh Hashemi Rafsanjani (b. 1962)
- Shokufeh Kavani (b. 1970)
- Bahareh Hedayat (b. 1981)
- Forough Azarakhshi (1904–1963)
- Elaheh Koulaei (b. 1956)
- Mastoureh Afshar (1898–1951)

== See also ==
- Death of Mahsa Amini
- Global Women's movement
- Homa Darabi
- Intellectual movements in Iran
- Iran's Family Protection Law
- Iranian women
- One million signatures campaign
- Sex segregation in Iran
- Women in Iran
- Women's rights in Iran
- Zahra Bani Yaghoub
- Zahra Kazemi

== Bibliography ==
- Khiabany, Gholam (2016). "15. The Importance of 'Social' in Social Media: The Lessons from Iran". In Bruns, Axel; Enli, Gunn; Skogerbo, Eli; Larsson, Anders Olof; Christensen, Christian (eds.). The Routledge Companion to Social Media and Politics. New York: Routledge; Taylor & Francis. pp. 223–234. doi:10.4324/9781315716299. hdl:11343/124284. ISBN 9781138860766. OCLC 949809653.
- Koo, Gi Yeon (2016). "To be Myself and have My Stealthy Freedom: The Iranian Women's Engagement with Social Media". Revista de Estudios Internacionales Mediterráneos. 21 (2016). Madrid: Autonomous University of Madrid: 141–157. doi:10.15366/reim2016.21.011. hdl:10486/676926. ISSN 1887-4460. OCLC 6911173726.
- Novak, Alison N.; Khazraee, Emad (November 2014). "The Stealthy Protester: Risk and the Female Body in Online Social Movements". Feminist Media Studies. 14 (6). Basingstoke: Routledge; Taylor & Francis: 1094–1095. doi:10.1080/14680777.2014.975438. ISSN 1468-0777. OCLC 5696610168. S2CID 143773123.
- Rouhof, Milan S.F.; Trakilović, Milica; Midden, Eva (2016). A joint battle against the hijab? A critical discourse analysis of "My Stealthy Freedom" and the Western media coverage (PDF) (Thesis). Utrecht: Universiteit Utrecht. OCLC 958942537. Archived from the original (PDF) on 2017-02-22.
- Seddighi, Gilda; Tafakori, Sara (August 2016). "Transnational mediation of state gendered violence: the case of Iran". Feminist Media Studies. 16 (5). Basingstoke: Routledge; Taylor & Francis: 925–928. doi:10.1080/14680777.2016.1213575. ISSN 1468-0777. S2CID 151547466.
- Tahmasebi-Birgani, Victoria (2017). "11. Social Media as a Site of Transformative Politics: Iranian Women's Online Contestations". In Vahabzadeh, Peyman (ed.). Iran's Struggles for Social Justice: Economics, Agency, Justice, Activism. Cham, Switzerland: Palgrave Macmillan; Springer Nature. pp. 181–198. doi:10.1007/978-3-319-44227-3_11. ISBN 9783319442266. OCLC 953598337.
- Talebian, Sara (July 2016). 'My Stealthy Freedom' and Illusion of Activism; Take a Photo and be an Activist. ECPR Graduate Student Conference. Tartu: University of Tartu; European Consortium for Political Research (ECPR). pp. 1–14.
- Sanasarian, Eliz (1982). The Women's Rights Movements in Iran. New York: Praeger. ISBN 0-03-059632-7.
