= Sediqeh Dowlatabadi =

Iranian feminist activist and journalist (1882–1961)

- صدیقه دولت‌آبادی
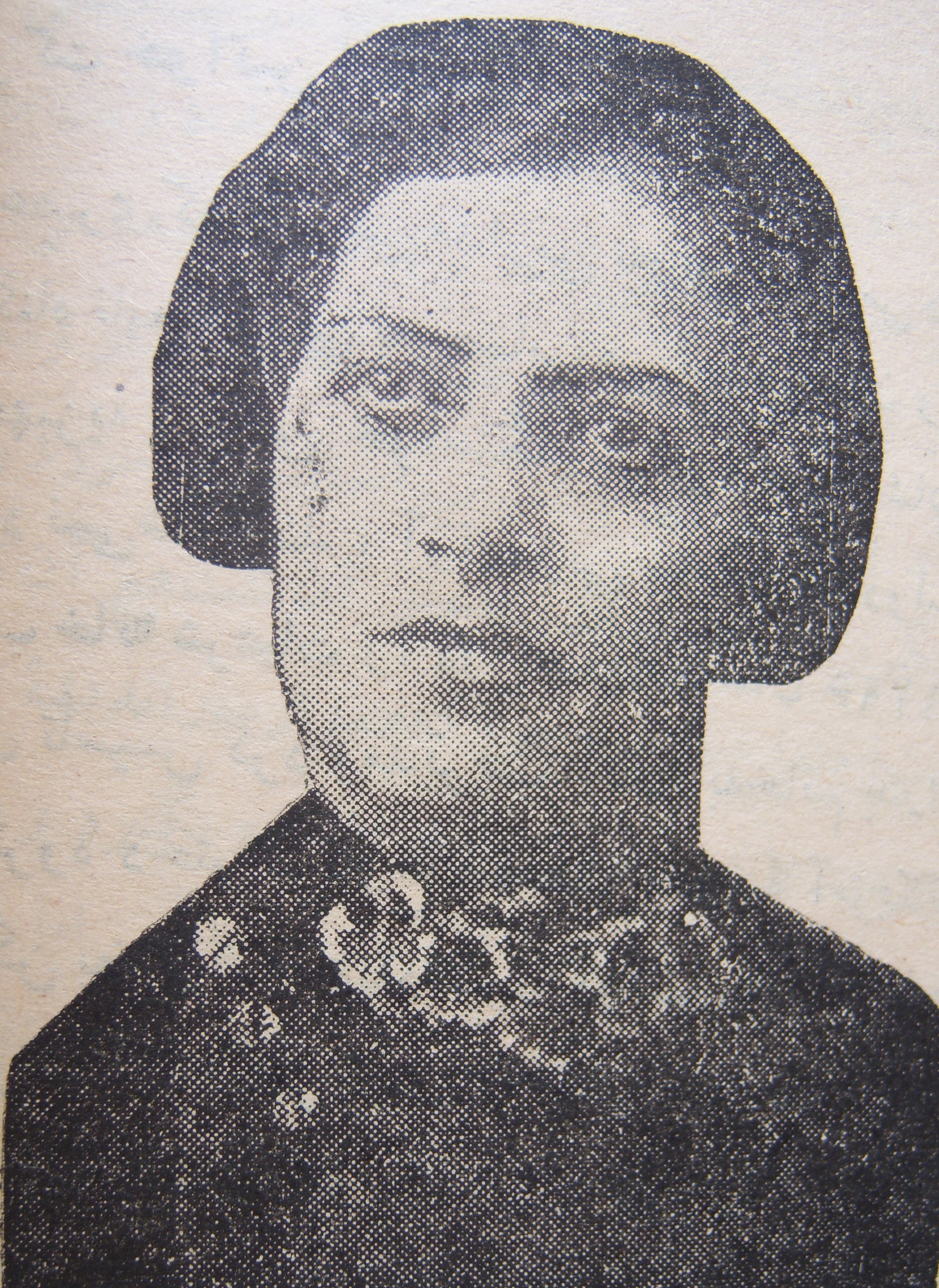
- Born: 1882; Isfahan, Iran
- Died: 30 July 1961 (aged 78–79); Tehran, Iran

Sediqeh Dowlatabadi (Persian: صدیقه دولت‌آبادی; 1882 in Isfahan – 30 July 1961 in Tehran) was an Iranian feminist activist and journalist and one of the pioneering figures in the Persian women's movement.

On one of the occasions when Dowlatabadi was arrested for her activities, she replied:

Sir, I was born a hundred years late, if I had been born earlier, I would not have allowed women to be so humiliated and trapped in your chains.

== Early life ==
Dowlatabadi was born in 1882 in Isfahan. Her father was Hadi Dowlatabadi and her mother was Khatameh Begum. Her father was a progressive religious jurist and allowed Dowlatabadi to begin her education in Persian and Arabic in Tehran. She then continued her secondary education at the Dar-ol-Fonoun Academy. Aged 15, she married Etezad al-Hakma, but they divorced because Dowlatabadi was infertile.

== Career ==
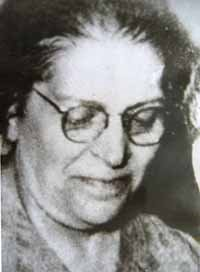
Sediqeh Dowlatabadi

Dowlatabadi believed that the only route for the advancement of women was through their education. In 1917, she founded one of the first girls' primary schools, called Umm Al- Madaris (Mother of Schools). The school was closed after objections from religious conservatives and Dowlatabadi was beaten and detained for three months as a result.

In order to educate, she recognised that women needed news and articles that addressed their issues and concerns. This led her to establish the first women's gazette in Isfahan called Zaban-e Zanan in 1919. This was the third women's newspaper to be published in Iran, and ran for 57 issues until 1921. It was notable for its progressive stance and the outspoken nature of its articles on women's rights. In her first editorial in it she pronounced that paper wanted to challenge the "backwardness and feeble-mindedness" of women's rights in the city. She also established the Women's Association of Isfahan at this time.

When the Second Eastern Women's Congress was arranged in Tehran in 1932, Princess Shams Pahlavi served as its president and Dowlatabadi as its secretary.

Dowlatabadi was an opponent of British involvement in Iran. Together with other like-minded women, she expressed her opposition to the agreement by boycotting imported goods and going to coffee shops and encouraging them not to use foreign sugar.

From 1925, there was a debate within the intellectual community, newspapers and women's magazines in Iran about the unveiling of women and whether it could act as a modernizing force in the country and increase women's participation in society. During the late 1920s and 1930s there were rumours that the government planned to introduce a policy of compulsory unveiling (the reform, known as Kashf-e hijab, was promulgated in 1936). Dowlatabadi was an outspoken advocate for the unveiling of women. However this led to threats against her life.

In 1926 she attended the International Alliance of Women's Conference in Paris and on her return wore European clothes and refused to wear a veil. She is believed to have been the first woman to have done so, appearing in public in 1928 completely unveilied. Another advocate for unveiling was Khadijeh Afzal Vaziri, who campaigned for change in fashion alongside Dowlatabadi. When Reza Shah banned the veil in 1936, Dowlatabadi was an active supporter of the reform, and engaged in the new women's committee Kanoun-e-Banovan (Ladies Society) formed by the government. The committee was led by the Shah's daughter, Princess Shams, to unite women organisations and prepare women for unveiling.

By 1941, Dowlatabadi was Director of the Women's Centre, however the organisation had little autonomy - for example they needed permission from the Ministry of Education to organise a commemoration of the poet Parvin Etesami.

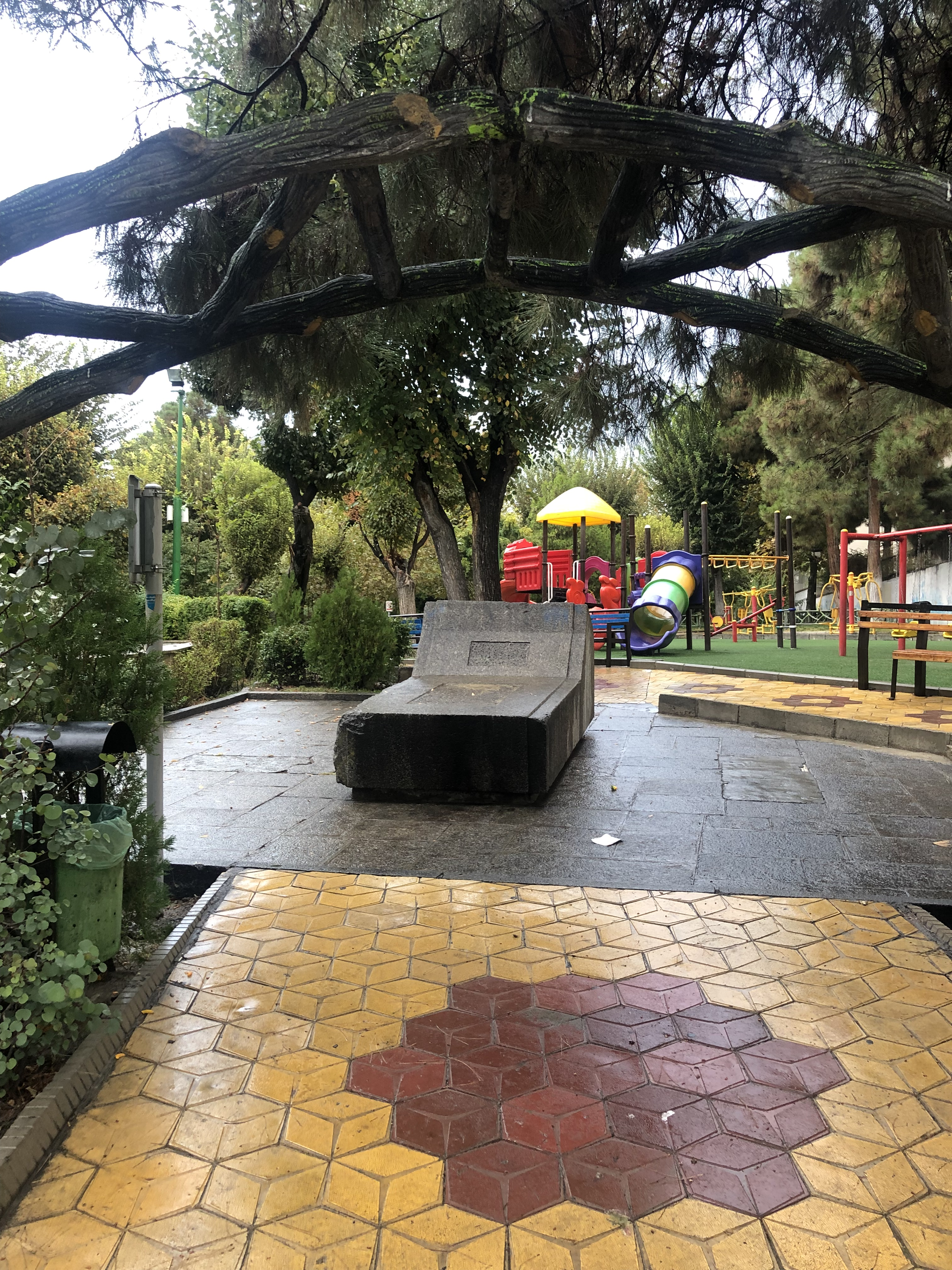
Sediqeh Dowlatabadi grave, Zargandeh Park 3

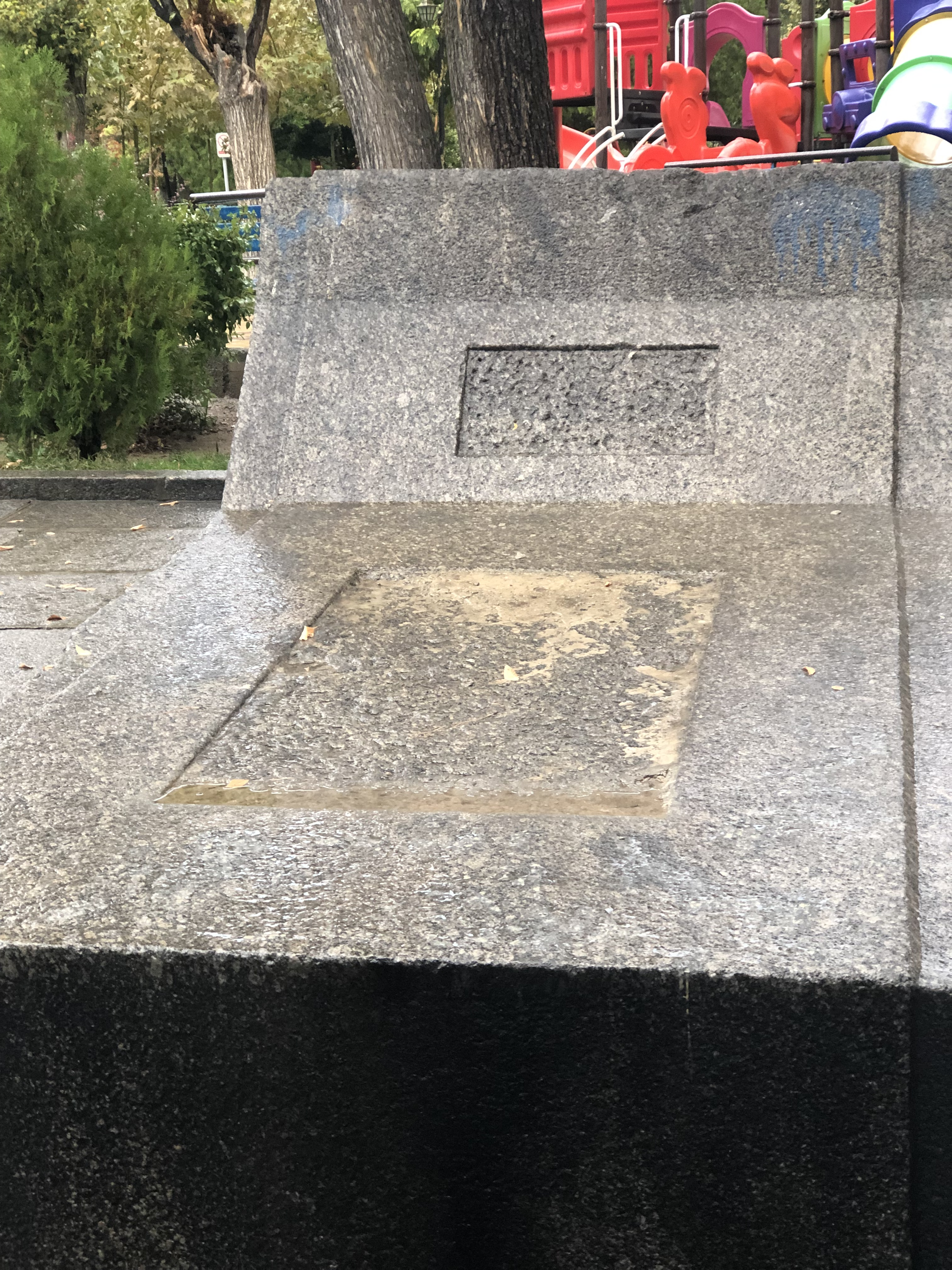
Sediqeh Dowlatabadi grave, with plaques destroyed

Dowlatabadi died on 27 August 1961 at the age of 80 in Tehran. She had been ill with cancer. She was buried next to her brother in the Imamzadeh Ismail Cemetery in Zargandeh, however during the 1979 Iranian Revolution her tomb was damaged and her remains desecrated.

== Legacy ==
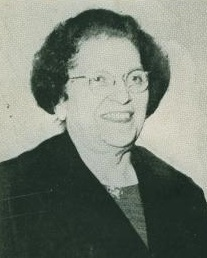
Sediqeh Dowlatabadi 3

Some of Dowlatabadi's archive is kept at the World Foundation for Social Research in Amsterdam. Part of this archive was exhibited in February 2016 at an exhibition on the background of the women's movement.
