= Dar al-Fonun =

Oldest institute of higher learning in Iran

Coordinates: 35°41′1.64″N 51°25′18.71″E

Dâr ol-Fonun
- دارالفنون
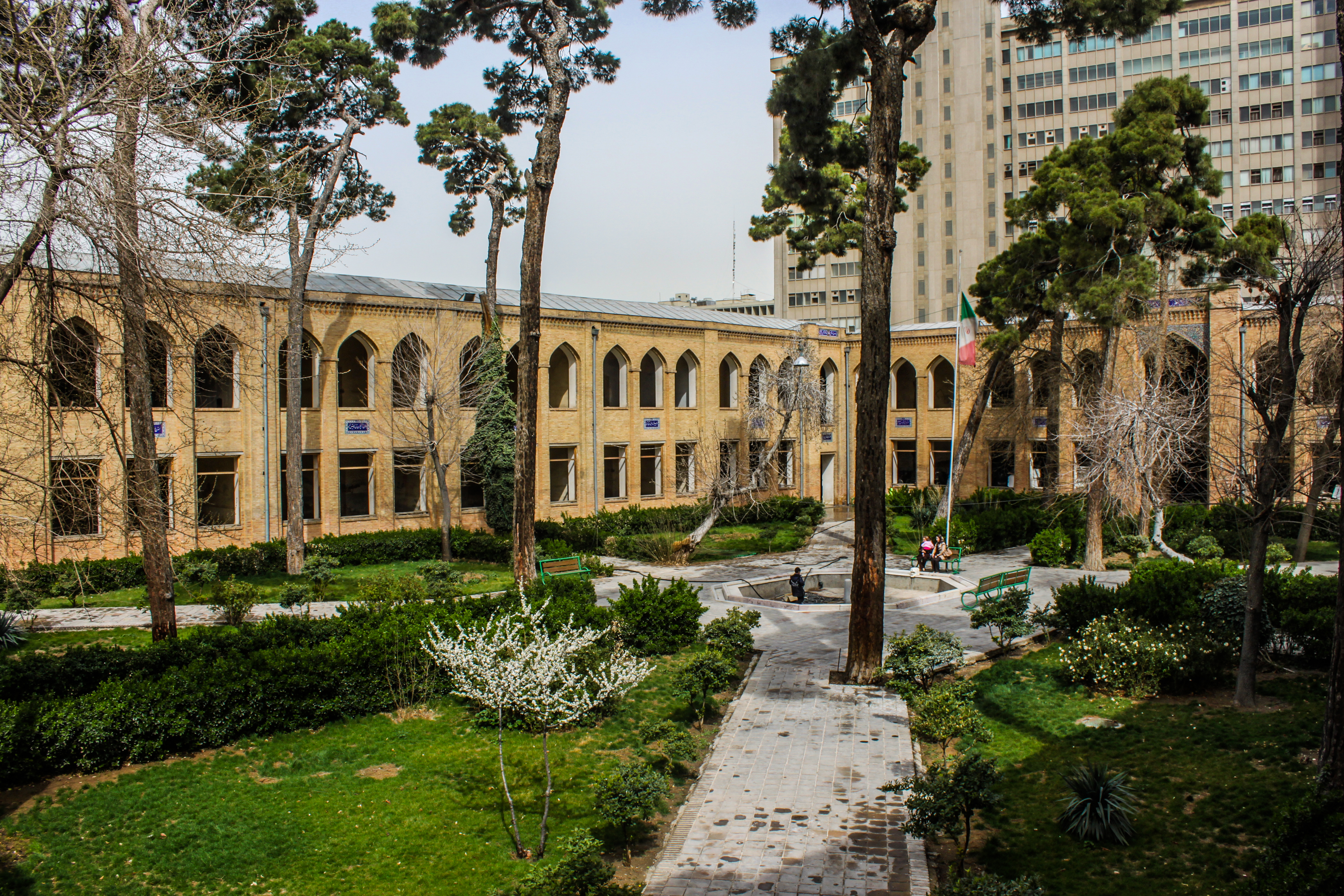
- Eastern gate of Dār ul-Funun in the Nāser Khosrow Street. The motto is inscribed on the upper part of the front face.
- Motto: توانا بود هرکه دانا بود ز دانش دل پیر برنا بود
- Motto in English: Mighty is the one who has knowledge By knowledge the old hearts grow young again (couplet from Ferdowsi's Shahnameh)
- Type: Polytechnic
- Established: 1851
- Endowment: 7,750 tomans (initially); 30,000 tomans (in 1930)
- Location: Tehran, Iran
- Language: Persian

Dar ul-Funun (Persian: دارالفنون, romanized: Dâr ol-Fonun, pronounced [ˌdɒːɹ ol‿fʊˈnuːn]; lit. 'polytechnic college') was an institute of higher education in Qajar Iran. It was established in 1851 by Amir Kabir, the grand vizier to Nasereddin Shah.

== Introduction ==
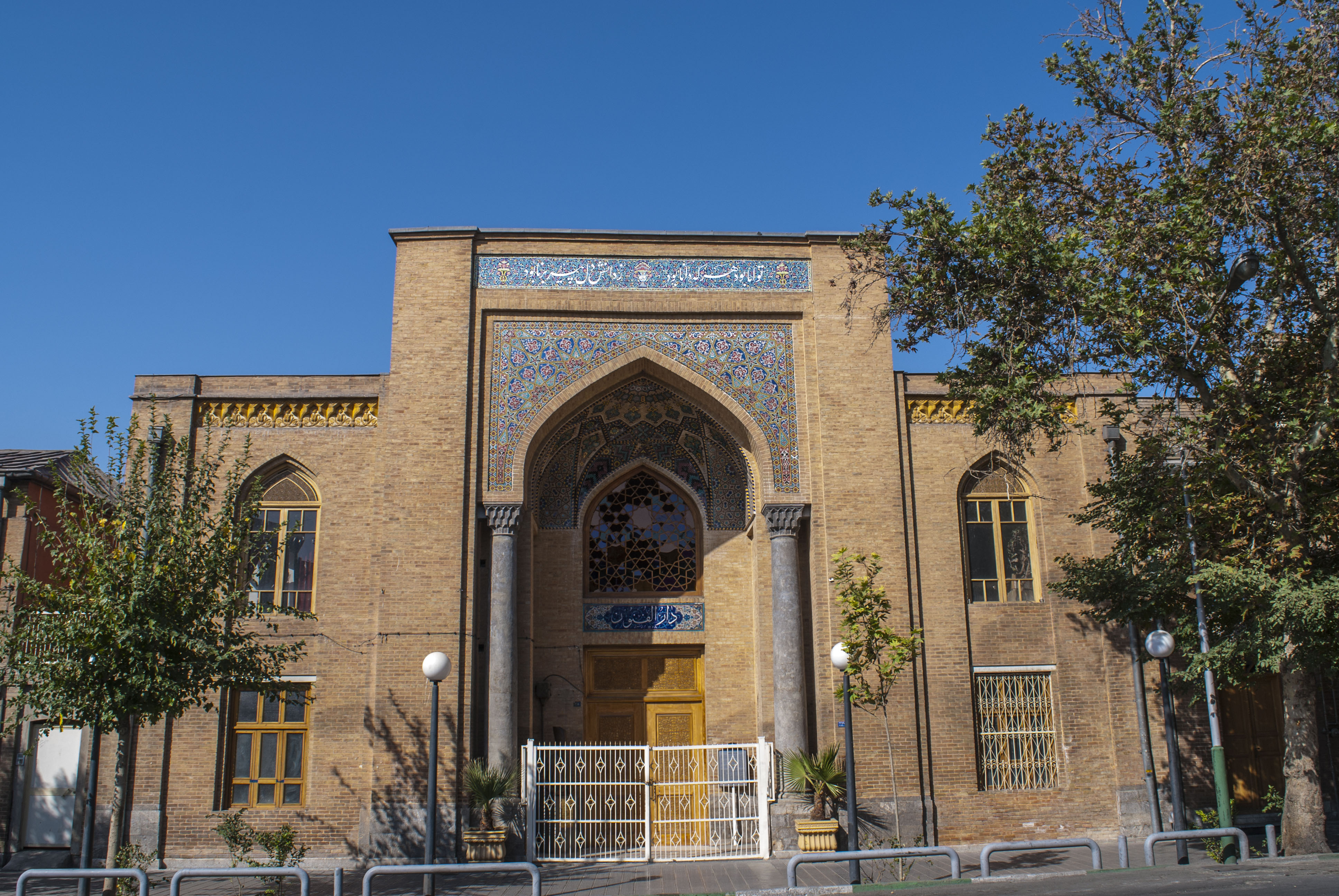
Entrance of Dar ul-Funun

Founded by Amir Kabir, then the grand vizier to Nasereddin Shah, the fourth Shah of Qajar Iran, Dār al-Funun originally was conceived as a polytechnic to train upper-class Iranian youth in medicine, engineering, military science, and geology. It was similar in scope and purpose to American land grant colleges like Purdue and Texas A&M. Like them, it developed and expanded its mission over the next hundred years, eventually becoming the University of Tehran.

The institute was planned by the Iranian-educated Mirzā Rezā Mohandes (fa), and built by the architect Mohammad-Taqi Khān Memār-Bāshi (fa) under the supervision of the Qajar prince Bahrām Mirzā. Facilities such as an assembly hall, a theater, library, cafeteria, and a publishing house were built for the institute. In 1930, the building was destroyed by Mirzā Yahyā Khan Qarāgozlu (also known as Etemād od-Dowleh), then Minister of Education, and rebuilt based on a Russian engineering design.

Many parts of the institute were later on absorbed and merged into the newly establishing Tehran University. The Faculty of Medicine for example, was particularly the successor to the Dār ul-Funun Department of Medicine, established in 1851, which had become the School of Medicine (Madreseh-ye Tebb) in 1919. The elite school was training 287 students by 1889, and had graduated 1100 students by 1891. During this time, the faculty consisted of 16 European, and 26 Iranian professors.

== List of presidents ==
- Mirza Mohammad-Ali Khan Shirazi (1851–52)
- Aziz Khān Mokri (1852)
- Mirzā Mohammad Khān Amir-Tumān (1852–57)
- Ali-Qoli Mirzā Etezād os-Saltaneh (1857–80)
- Ali-Qoli Khān Hedayāt Mokhber od-Dowleh (fa) (1880–96)
- Jafar-Qoli Khān Hedāyat Nayyer ol-Molk (fa)
- Mohammad-Hossein Khān Adib od-Dowleh
- Rezā-Qoli Khān Hedāyat Nayyer ol-Molk (fa) (1896–1906)

== Notable teachers ==
- Dr. Jakob Eduard Polak (1818–1891) – medicine and pharmacy
- Lieutenant August Karl Krziž (hr) (1814–1886) – artillery
- Captain Joseph Czarnotta – mineralogy
- Captain Zatti – engineering
- Alfred Baron de Gumoëns – infantry
- Johann von Nemiro – cavalry
- Michele Materazzo
- Francesco Materazzo
- Luigi Pesce
- Enrico Andreini – infantry
- Focchetti – pharmacy, physics and chemistry
- Jules Richard (fa) (1852–1891) – French language
- Ernest Cloquet
- Alfred Jean Baptiste Lemaire (1842–1907) – music
- Fedor Karaczay
- Alexandre Bohler – mathematics
- Borowski – geography
- Hawkin
- Félix Vauvillier
- Johan Louis Schlimmer (fa) (1819–1881)
- Joseph Désiré Tholozan (1820–1897)
- Albert Joseph Gasteiger (1823–1890)
- Ernst Höltzer (1835–1911)
- Martiros Khan Davidkhanian (1843–1905) – French and Russian
- Eskandar Khan Davidkhanian - French and Russian
- Mirzā Malkam Khān Nāzem od-Dowleh (1834–1908) – mathematics and geometry
- Mirzā Abdolghaffār Khān Najm od-Dowleh (fa) (1843–1908) – mathematics
- Mirzā Mohammad-Hossein Gharib Shams ol-Olamā (fa) (1843–1926) – Persian and Arabic languages
- Mohammad-Hossein Foroughi (fa) (1839–1907) – history
- Joseph Richard (fa) (1869–1935) – French language
- Abdorrazzāq Khān Baghāyeri (fa) (1869–1953) – engineering
- Dr. Mohammd-Hossein Loqmān Adham Loqmān od-Dowleh (fa) (1879–1951) – medicine
- Dr. Mohammd-Hassan Loqmān Adham Loqmān od-Molk (fa) (1884–1957) – medicine
- Ahmad Bahmanyār (fa) (1884–1955) – Persian language

== Notable alumni ==
=== Politicians ===
- Mirzā Hossein Khān Moshir od-Dowleh Sepahsālār (1828–1881) – prime minister (1871–73)
- Ali-Qoli Khān Hedāyat Mokhber od-Dowleh (fa) (1829–1897) – politician
- Jafar-Qoli Khān Hedāyat Nayyer ol-Molk (fa) (1832–1915) – politician
- Mirzā Mahmoud Khān Moshāver ol-Molk (fa) (1834–1920) – politician
- Narimān Khān Enāgolopiān Qavām os-Saltaneh (fa) (1836–18??) – diplomat
- Prince Abdolhamid Mirzā Nāser od-Dowleh (fa) (1840–1892) – politician
- Mohammad-Hassan Khān Etemād os-Saltaneh (ru) (1843–1896) – politician
- Dr. Mirzā Ali-Naghi Khān Hakim ol-Molk (fa) (18??–1903) – physician and politician
- Prince Abdolmajid Mirzā Eyn od-Dowleh (1845–1927) – prime minister
- Prince Abdossamad Mirzā Ezz od-Dowleh (1845–1929) – politician
- Mortezā-Qoli Khān Hedāyat Sanie od-Dowleh (1856–1911) – politician
- Prince Kāmrān Mirzā Nāyeb os-Saltaneh (1856–1928) – prime minister (1909)
- Prince Abdolhossein Mirzā Farmān-Farmā (1857–1939) – prime minister (1915)
- Abbās-Qoli Khān Ādamiyat (fa) (1861–1939) – politician
- Abolhassan Khān Ardalān Fakhr ol-Molk (1862–1926) – politician
- Mahmoud Khān Alāmir Ehteshām os-Saltaneh (1863–1936) – politician and diplomat
- Mousā Khān Hakimi Nazm os-Saltaneh (fa) (1864–1944) – politician
- Prince Mohammad Mirzā Kāshef os-Saltaneh (1866–1929) – diplomat and entrepreneur
- Mirzā Jafar Khān Esfandiāri Yamin ol-Mamālek (fa) (1867–1917) – politician
- Dr. Mohammad Sheikh Ehyā ol-Molk (fa) (1868–1938) – physician and politician
- Mirzā Nasrollāh Khān Khalatbari Etelā ol-Molk (fa) (1868–1962) – politician
- Mortezā Khān Momtāz ol-Molk (fa) (1869–19??) – politician
- Dr. Farajollāh Ziāei Ziā ol-Atebba (fa) (1870–19??) – physician and politician
- Ebrahim Hakimi Hakim ol-Molk (1871–1959) – prime minister (1945–47)
- Mostafā Khān Navāei Nayyer os-Soltān (fa) (1873–1940) – politician
- Hedāyat-Qoli Khān Etezād ol-Molk (fa) (1873–1953) – politician
- Esmāil Khān Adib Moāzed ol-Molk (fa) (1874–1923) – politician
- Yahyā Shams Malekārā (fa) (1874–1945) – politician
- Mirzā Jahangir Khān Sur-e-Esrafil (1875–1908) – journalist and political activist
- Mirzā Ebrāhim Khān Amid os-Saltaneh (fa) (1875–19??) – politician
- Mirzā Ahmad Khān Etelā os-Saltaneh (fa) (1875–19??) – politician
- Dr. Hossein-Qoli Qezel-Ayāgh (fa) (1875–1957) – physician and politician
- Dr. Hossein Khān Bahrāmi Ehyā os-Saltaneh (fa) (1876–1940) – politician
- Prince Soleimān Mirzā Eskandari (1876–1944) – political activist
- Mirzā Hassan Khān Esfandiāri Mohtashem os-Saltaneh (1876–1945) – politician
- Asadollāh Ghaffārzādeh (fa) (1876–19??) – journalist and political activist
- Hossein Samiei (1876–1954) – politician
- Khalil Fahimi Fahim ol-Molk (ru) (1876–1953) – politician
- Dr. Ali Khān Partow-Azam Hakim Azam (fa) (1877–1938) – physician and politician
- Mohammad-Ali Foroughi Zokā ol-Molk (1877–1942) – prime minister (1925–26, 1933–35 and 1941–42) and scholar
- Abdolhamid Saqafi Matin os-Saltaneh (fa) (1878–1917) – journalist and politician
- Mohammad-Ali Farzin (fa) (1878–1941) – politician
- Prince Nosratollāh Mirzā Amir Azam (fa) (1879–1916) – politician
- Ebrāhim Monshizādeh (fa) (1879–1918) – political activist
- Mirzā Nasrollāh Khān Sheibāni Jalil ol-Molk (fa) (1879–1959) – politician
- Yār-Mohammad Khān Afshār Sardār Saeid (fa) (1880–1936) – politician
- Prince Mohammad-Hāshem Mirzā Afsar (fa) (1880–1940) – politician
- Ahmad Fereydouni (fa) (1881–1969) – politician
- Mirzā Loqmān Nahourāi (fa) (1882–19??) – politician
- Gholām-Hossein Rahnamā (fa) (1882–1946) – minister of education
- Mirzā Farajollāh Khān Bahrāmi Dabir Azam (fa) (1882–1948) – politician
- Sediqeh Dowlatābādi (1882–1961) – journalist and political activist
- Ali-Akbar Hakimi (fa) (1883–19??) – politician
- Mirzā Hassan Farahmand Mokhber Hozour (fa) (1883–19??) – politician
- Ehsānollāh Khān Doustdār (1884–1939) – politician
- Dr. Hassan Loqmān Adham Hakim od-Dowleh (fa) (1884–1957) – physician and politician
- Dr. Ebrāhim Heshmat (1885–1919) – physician and politician
- Ali-Akbar Dāvar (1885–1937) – minister of justice
- Kāzem Khān Mojdehi Motamed Divān (fa) (1885–1964) – politician
- Ali-Asghar Zarrinkafsh (fa) (1885–1969) – politician
- Ali Mansour Mansour ol-Molk (1886–1974) – prime minister (1940–41)
- Ahmad Akhgar (fa) (1888–1969) – politician
- Asadollāh Yamin Esfandiāri Yamin ol-Mamālek (fa) (1889–1955) – politician
- Jamāleddin Akhavi (fa) (1891–1983) – politician
- Ghāsem Ghani (fa) (1893–1952) – diplomat
- Ali-Akbar Siāsi (1895–1990) – minister of foreign affairs
- Ali Soheili (1896–1958) – prime minister (1942–44)
- Mousā Nouri Esfandiāri (1896–1972) – minister of foreign affairs
- Dr. Javād Āshtiāni (fa) (1896–1981) – minister of health
- Abdolhossein Masoud Ansāri (fa) (1896–1984) – diplomat
- Abbās Eskandari (1897–1955) – politician
- Abolghāsem Narāghi (fa) (1899–1945) – politician
- Abdollāh Entezām (1899–1982) – diplomat
- Ebrāhim Fakhrāei (fa) (1899–1988) – politician
- Nasrollāh Entezām (1900–1980) – diplomat
- Shamseddin Amir-Alāei (fa) (1900–1994) – politician
- Hossein Naghavi (fa) (1901–1964) – politician
- Dr. Mehdi Āzar (fa) (1901–1994) – physician and politician
- Abdolhossein Hazhir (1902–1949) – prime minister (1948)
- Abbās-Qoli Golshāyān (fa) (1902–1990) – minister of finance
- Taghi Arāni (1903–1940) – political activist
- Mohammad-Ali Maleki (fa) (1903–1996) – politician
- Abdolhamid Zanganeh (fa) (1904–1951) – minister of education
- Rezā Rādmanesh (1905–1984) – politician
- Ali Amini (1905–1992) – prime minister (1961–62)
- Gholām-Hossein Sadighi (1905–1992) – minister of interior
- Taghi Nasr (fa) (1906–1985) – minister of finance
- Kāzem Hassibi (1906–1990) – politician
- Yadollāh Sahābi (1906–2002) – politician
- Fakhreddin Shādemān (fa) (1907–1967) – politician
- Fereydoun Keshāvarz (1907–2006) – politician
- Ali-Akbar Emāmi Ahari (fa) (1908–19??) – politician
- Ahmad Zirakzādeh (1908–1993) – politician
- Dr. Manouchehr Eghbāl (1909–1977) – prime minister (1957–60)
- Ahmad Houman (fa) (1909–1995) – politician
- Mohammad-Hossein Aliābādi (fa) (1909–1995) – politician
- Dr. Nosratollāh Kāsemi (fa) (1911–1995) – physician and politician
- Yahyā Sādegh Vaziri (fa) (1911–2013) – minister of justice
- Mozzafar Baghāei (1912–1987) – politician
- Javād Sadr (fa) (1912–2000) – diplomat
- Shamseddin Jazāyeri (fa) (1913–1990) – politician
- Shams Qanātābādi (fa) (1914–1988) – politician
- Ali Ardalān (1914–2000) – economist and politician
- Hassan Arsanjāni (1922–1969) – politician
- Fereydoun Motamed Vaziri (fa) (1922–2006) – politician
- Ziāeddin Shādemān (1923–2009) – politician
- Jahānguir Mahdminā (1925–2018) – minister of energy
- Siāvash Kasrāei (1927–1996) – political activist
- Hossein Shāh-Hosseini (1928–2017) – politician
- Ebrāhim Yazdi (1931–2017) – minister of foreign affairs
- Mostafā Chamrān (1932–1981) – minister of national defence
- Abbās Amir-Entezām (1932–2018) – politician
- Mohammad-Hassan Eslāmi (fa) (1933–2018) – minister of communications
- Sādegh Ghotbzādeh (1936–1982) – minister of foreign affairs
- Mahmoud Kāzemi Dinān (fa) (1939–2007) – politician
- Abdolkarim Lāhiji (b. 1940) – political activist
- Kāzem Akrami (fa) (b. 1940) – minister of education
- Hamid Ashraf (1946–1976) – political activist
- Ali Nazari (fa) (b. 1947) – politician
- Mohammad Mofidi (fa) (1948–1972) – political activist
- Mohammad-Hossein Ādeli (b. 1953) – economist and politician
- Shahābeddin Bimeghdār (b. 1953) – politician
- Majid Qāsemi (b. 1952) – politician and economist
- Rezā Āmeri (fa) (b. 1961) – diplomat
- Dr. Shahābeddin Sadr (b. 1962) – minister of health

=== Military personnel ===
- General Amānollāh Khān Jahānbāni Ziā od-Dowleh (1869–1923) – Cossack Brigade general
- Admiral Ahmad Khān Daryābeigi (18??–1923) – Imperial Iranian Navy (IIN) admiral
- General Mahmoud Khosrowpanāh Ezām os-Soltān (fa) (1886–1972) – Gendarmerie general
- General Hādi Khānshaqāqi Hesn od-Dowleh (fa) (1889–1959) – IIA general
- General Ali-Asghar Naghdi (fa) (1895–1966) – IIA general and minister of war
- Admiral Gholām-Ali Bāyandor (1898–1941) – IIN admiral
- Colonel Sharafeddin Ghahramāni (fa) (1900–1942) – Imperial Iranian Air Force (IIAF) pilot
- General Hāj-Ali Razmārā (1901–1951) – Imperial Iranian Army (IIA) general and prime minister (1950–51)
- General Ahmad Zanganeh (fa) (1904–19??) – IIA general
- General Abbās Izadpanāh (fa) (1905–19??) – IIA general
- Admiral Farajollāh Rasāei (1908–2002) – IIN admiral
- General Mohammd-Taghi Riāhi (1911–1988) – IIA general
- General Mohammad-Vali Gharani (1913–1979) – IIA general
- General Hassan Toufāniān (1913–1998) – IIAF general
- Admiral Abbās Ramzi Atāei (1928–2018) – IIN admiral
- Admiral Kamāl Habibollāhi (1930–2016) – IIN admiral

=== Religion ===
- Mírzá Ḥasan-i-Adíbu'l-ʻUlamá (Adíb) (1848–1919) – writer, Apostle of Baháʼu'lláh, Hand of the Cause of the Bahá’í Faith

=== Scholars ===
- Prince Jalāleddin Mirzā (1827–1872) – historian
- Dr. Mohammad Mirzā Kermānshāhi (1828/29–1908) – physician
- Mirzā Abolfazl Golpāygāni (1844–1914) – Bahá’í scholar
- Dr. Ali-Akbar Khān Nafisi Nāzem ol-Atebbā (1847–1924) – physician
- Dr. Mirzā Mahmoud Khān Boroujerdi (fa) (1856–1903) – physician
- Dr. Khalil Saqafi Alam od-Dowleh (fa) (1862–1944) – physician
- Ali-Mohammad Farahvashi Motarjem Homāyoun (fa) (1875–1968) – scholar
- Dr. Amir Khān Amir-Alam (fa) (1876–1961) – physician and politician
- Dr. Valiollāh Nasr (fa) (1878–1945) – physician and politician
- Abdolazim Gharib (ru) (1879–1965) – linguist
- Dr. Mehdi Malekzādeh (fa) (1881–1955) – physician
- Dr. Abdollāh Ahmadieh (fa) (1886–1959) – physician
- Dr. Hossein Khān Motamed (1893–1955) – surgeon
- Isā Sedigh (1894–1978) – scholar
- Abbās Eghbāl Āshtiāni (1896–1956) – historian
- Badiozzamān Forouzānfar (1897–1970) – scholar
- Abdorrasoul Khayyāmpour (fa) (1898–1979) – scholar
- Nasrollāh Falsafi (fa) (1901–1981) – scholar
- Mohammad Mohit Tabātabāei (fa) (1901–1992) – scholar
- Dr. Ahmad Farhād (fa) (1902–1971) – physician
- Mojtabā Minovi (1903–1977) – historian
- Dr. Mahmoud Najmābādi (fa) (1903–2000) – physician
- Hossein-Qoli Mostaān (fa) (1904–1983) – scholar
- Dr. Hossein Rezāei (fa) (1904–1993) – psychologist
- Mehdi Bayāni (fa) (1906–1968) – scholar
- Dr. Abdolhossein Mirsepāsi (fa) (1907–1976) – psychologist
- Abolghāsem Ghaffāri (fa) (1907–2013) – scientist
- Mohsen Hashtroodi (1908–1976) – mathematician
- Dr. Morteza Kaveh (1905–1986) - vaccine & serum pioneer
- Habib Nafisi (1908–1984) – scholar
- Yahyā Mahdavi (fa) (1908–2000) – psychologist
- Asadollāh Āl-e Bouyeh (fa) (1908–2002) – mathematician
- Dr. Ebrāhim Chehrāzi (fa) (1908–2010) – psychologist
- Dr. Mohammad Gharib (1909–1975) – physician
- Khānbābā Bayāni (fa) (1909–1997) – scholar
- Mohammad Mohaqqeqi (fa) (1910–1970) – cleric
- Ahmad Fardid (1910–1994) – philosopher
- Zabihollāh Safā (1911–1999) – scholar
- Mohammad Moin (1914–1971) – lexicographer
- Parviz Nātel Khānlari (1914–1990) – scholar and politician
- Mostafā Moqarrabi (fa) (1914–1998) – scholar
- Abolghāsem Kheradjou (fa) (1915–1986) – economist
- Hossein Khatibi (fa) (1916–2001) – scholar
- Dr. Ali Farr (fa) (1916–2016) – physician
- Mohammad-Javād Mashkour (fa) (1918–1995) – linguist
- Abbās Yamini Sharif (fa) (1919–1989) – scholar
- Sādegh Kiā (fa) (1920–2001) – linguist
- Fereydoun Ādamiyat (1920–2008) – historian and diplomat
- Enāyatollāh Rezā (1920–2010) – historian
- Hāshem Kārdoush (fa) (1922–2015) – scholar
- Mortezā Rāvandi (fa) (1923–1999) – historian
- Dr. Noureddin Mojtahedi (fa) (1923–2002) – physician
- Jalāleddin Āshtiāni (fa) (1924–2015) – scholar
- Ehsān Narāghi (1926–2012) – sociologist
- Houshang Alam (fa) (1928–2007) – linguist
- Mahmoud Rouholamini (fa) (1928–2011) – anthropologist
- Dr. Mohammad Shafiezādeh (fa) (1928–2014) – physician
- Seifollāh Kāmbakhshfard (1929–2010) – archaeologist
- Bāgher Āqeli (fa) (1929–2013) – historian
- Dr. Hājeb Mortāz (fa) (b. 1931) – physician
- Zardosht Houshvar (fa) (b. 1931) – scholar
- Mazāher Mosaffā (fa) (1932–2019) – scholar
- Dr. Mortezā Katbi (fa) (b. 1932) – psychologist
- Mohammad Taghi Sadr (fa) (1933–2018) – mathematician
- Yahyā Ardalān (fa) (1934–2014) – scholar
- Seyyed Nasrollah Sadrolhoffazi (1934–2022) – judge
- Mohammad-Rahim Sarrāf (fa) (b. 1936) – archaeologist
- Ahmad Tafazzoli (1937–1997) – linguist
- Hormoz Milāniān (fa) (1937–2014) – linguist
- Abbās Shafiei (1937–2016) – chemist
- Dāriush Āshouri (b. 1938) – scholar
- Dāriush Farhoud (fa) (b. 1938) – physician
- Abbās Alijānzādeh Ārāni (fa) (b. 1938) – linguist
- Shamseddin Mojābi (1939–2012) – scholar
- Mohammad-Rezā Ziāei (fa) (b. 1939) – scholar
- Dāriush Farhoud (fa) (b. 1939) – physician
- Ahmad Kāzemi (fa) (b. 1940) – historian
- Amir Hassanpour (1943–2017) – linguist
- Bahman Keshāvarz (fa) (1944–2019) – lawyer
- Ali Tābandeh Mahboub-Ali Shāh (fa) (1945–1997) – Sufi leader
- Jāber Anāsori (fa) (1945–2016) – scholar
- Mohsen Ghāne Basiri (1949–2017) – scholar
- Kāmrān Nejātollāhi (fa) (1954–1978) – scholar
- Mohammad Karamoddini (b. 1955) – scholar
- Ahmad Hātami (fa) (1960–2015) – scholar

=== Artists and writers ===
- Hossein Towfigh, Editor-in-Chief of Towfigh Magazine
- Mirzā Ali-Akbar Khān Mozayyan od-Dowleh (fa) (1844–1920) – painter and musician
- Mirzā Mehdi Khān Shaqāqi Momtahen od-Dowleh (fa) (1844–1920) – architect
- Mohammad Khān Ghaffāri Kamāl ol-Molk (1847–1940) – painter
- Mirzā Aboutorāb Ghaffāri (fa) (1847–1890) – painter
- Prince Abdollah Mirza Qajar (1850–1912) – photographer
- Esmāil Jalāyer (19th cent.) – painter
- Gholām-Rezā Khān Minbāshiān (fa) (1861–1935) – musician
- Arsalān Khān Nāser Homāyoun (fa) (1866–1920) – musician
- Fekri Ershād Moayed ol-Mamālek (1869–1916) – playwright
- Hossein-Ali Khān Hendesi Gorān (fa) (1871–1932) – architect
- Gholām-Hossein Khān Darvish (1872–1926) – musician
- Mirzā Ahmad Khān Mahmoudi Kamāl ol-Vezāreh (fa) (1874–1930) – playwright
- Hossein Hangāfarin (fa) (1875–1952) – musician
- Mehdi Rusi Khan Ivanov (1875–1968) – photographer
- Ali-Akbar Dehkhodā (1879–1956) – politician, author and linguist
- Hādi Hāeri (fa) (1886–1977) – writer
- Esmāil Āshtiāni (fa) (1892–1970) – scholar
- Hossein Jodat (fa) (1892–1990) – writer
- Abbās Forāt Yazdi (ar) (1894–1968) – poet
- Abdollāh Dādvar (fa) (1894–1977) – musician
- Ali-Akbar Kāveh (fa) (1894–1990) – calligrapher
- Hossein Gol-e Golāb (1895–1985) – musician
- Mohammad-Ali Amirjāhed (fa) (1896–1977) – songwriter
- Ebrāhim Mansouri (fa) (1899–1970) – musician
- Esmāil Zarrinfar (fa) (1901–1993) – musician
- Mortezā Moshfeq Kāzemi (ru) (1902–1978) – novelist
- Javād Badiezādeh (fa) (1902–1980) – musician
- Sādegh Hedāyat (1903–1951) – novelist
- Abolhassan Amidi (fa) (1903–1980) – writer and journalist
- Mirzā Soroush Lohrāsp (fa) (1904–1980) – writer and philanthropist
- Esmāil Mehrtāsh (fa) (1904–1996) – musician
- Ahmad Ārām (fa) (1904–1998) – writer
- Mohammad-Taghi Mostafavi (fa) (1905–1980) – archaeologist
- Rezā Mashāyekhi (fa) (1905–1990) – translator
- Hossein-Ali Vaziritabār (fa) (1906–1958) – musician
- Rouhollāh Khāleghi (1906–1965) – musician
- Hassan Rādmard (fa) (1906–1978) – musician
- Hassan Mashhoun (fa) (1906–1979) – musician
- Masoud Farzād (fa) (1906–1981) – writer
- Gholām-Hossein Khān Minbāshiān (fa) (1907–1980) – musician
- Mohammad-Hossein Shahriār (1907–1988) – poet
- Ebrāhim Sahbā (fa) (1911–1999) – writer
- Houshang Vaziri (fa) (1911–2003) – journalist
- Mehdi Barkeshli (fa) (1912–1988) – musician
- Ahmad Nāzerzādeh (fa) (1913–1976) – writer
- Mohammad Ghāzi (1913–1998) – writer and translator
- Lotfollāh Mofakham-Pāyān (fa) (1915–1984) – musician
- Ebrāhim Karimābādi (1917–1981) – journalist
- Jafar Bozorgi (fa) (1917–2006) – actor
- Ebrāhim Modarresi (fa) (1918–2007) – writer and journalist
- Mohammad-Hossein Jalili (fa) (1919–1979) – poet
- Mohammad Bahmanbeigi (1920–2010) – writer and philanthropist
- Jalāl Āl-e Ahmad (1923–1969) – writer
- Houshang Montaseri (fa) (1923–2015) – translator
- Dāriush Asadzādeh (fa) (1923–2019) – actor
- Abdollāh Tavakkol (fa) (1924–1999) – translator
- Fereydoun Moshiri (1926–2000) – poet
- Hassan Tofigh (fa) (1926–2020) – cartoonist and journalist
- Siāvash Kasrāei (1927–1996) – poet
- Mohammad-Taghi Masoudieh (fa) (1927–1999) – musician
- Homāyoun Nour-Ahmar (fa) (1927–2013) – translator
- Mahmoud Tolouei (fa) (1930–2015) – writer
- Ahmad Rasoulzādeh (fa) (1930–2015) – voice actor
- Ahmad Samiei (fa) (b. 1930) – musician
- Jahāngir Malek (fa) (1933–2002) – musician
- Farāmarz Pāyvar (1933–2009) – musician
- Farrokh Tamimi (fa) (1934–2002) – poet
- Dāvoud Navvābi (fa) (b. 1934) – translator
- Manouchehr Neyestāni (fa) (1936–1982) – poet
- Fereydoun Farrokhzād (1936–1992) – singer and poet
- Bāgher Āyatollāhzādeh (fa) (1936–2007) – architect
- Nāder Ebrāhimi (1936–2008) – writer
- Mohsen Sharif (fa) (1936–2016) – writer
- Esmāil Shangeleh (fa) (b. 1936) – actor
- Bahrām Beyzāei (b. 1938) – film director
- Abolhassan Tahāminejād (fa) (b. 1938) – voice actor
- Nowzar Parang (fa) (1937–2006) – songwriter
- Mohammad-Ali Sepānlou (1940–2015) – poet
- Ahmadreza Ahmadi (b. 1940) – poet and screenwriter
- Mohammad-Ebrāhim Jafari (fa) (1940–2018) – painter
- Manouchehr Ehterāmi (fa) (1941–2009) – writer
- Mostafā Eslāmieh (fa) (1941–2016) – writer
- Mohammad-Ali Najafi (fa) (b. 1945) – film director
- Masoud Houshmand (fa) (1946–2010) – songwriter
- Atāollāh Omaidvār (fa) (b. 1946) – architect and painter
- Hamid-Rezā Afshār (fa) (b. 1955) – actor

== See also ==
- Danesh
- Higher education in Iran
- Alborz High School
- Academy of Gondishapur
- Nizamiyya
- List of universities in Iran
- List of Iranian scientists from the pre-modern era.
- Modern Iranian scientists and engineers
- List of Iranian Research Centers
- School of Nisibis
- Sarouyeh
- Baku State University (Baku State Dar ul-Funun)
- Istanbul University (Dar ul-Funun in Turkey)
