= Mojabi =

Iranian family name

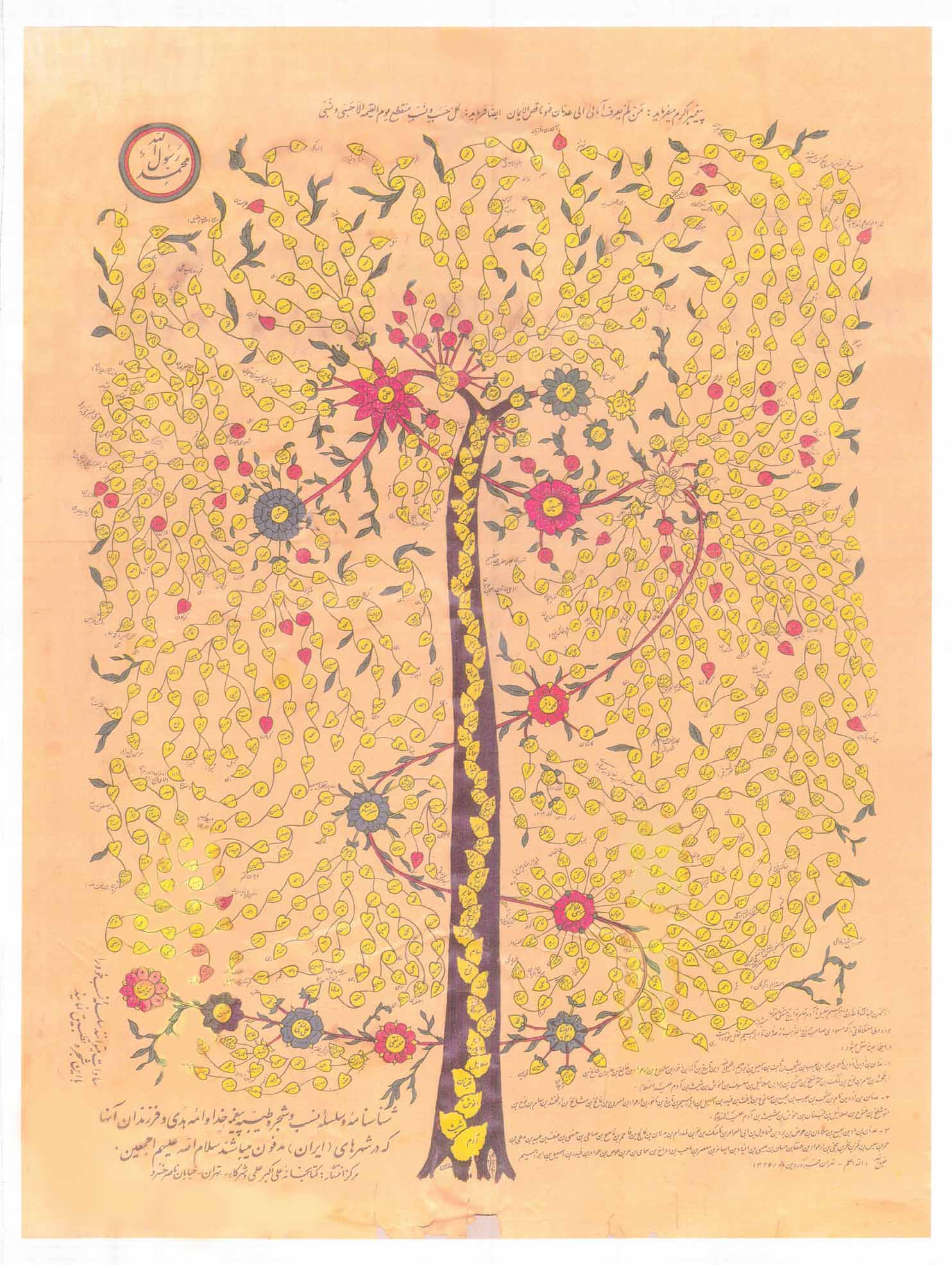
Mojabi family tree.

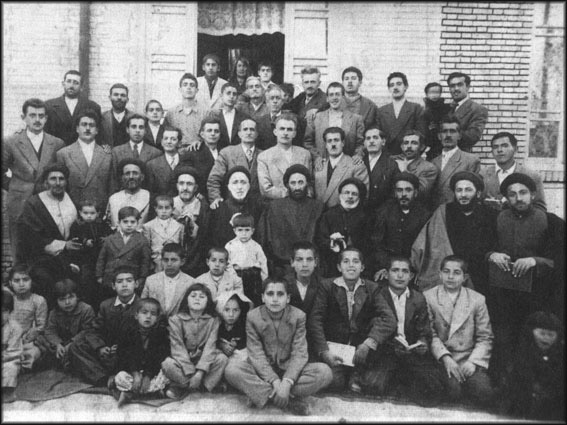
Photograph of Mojabi Qazvini family taken in 1955.

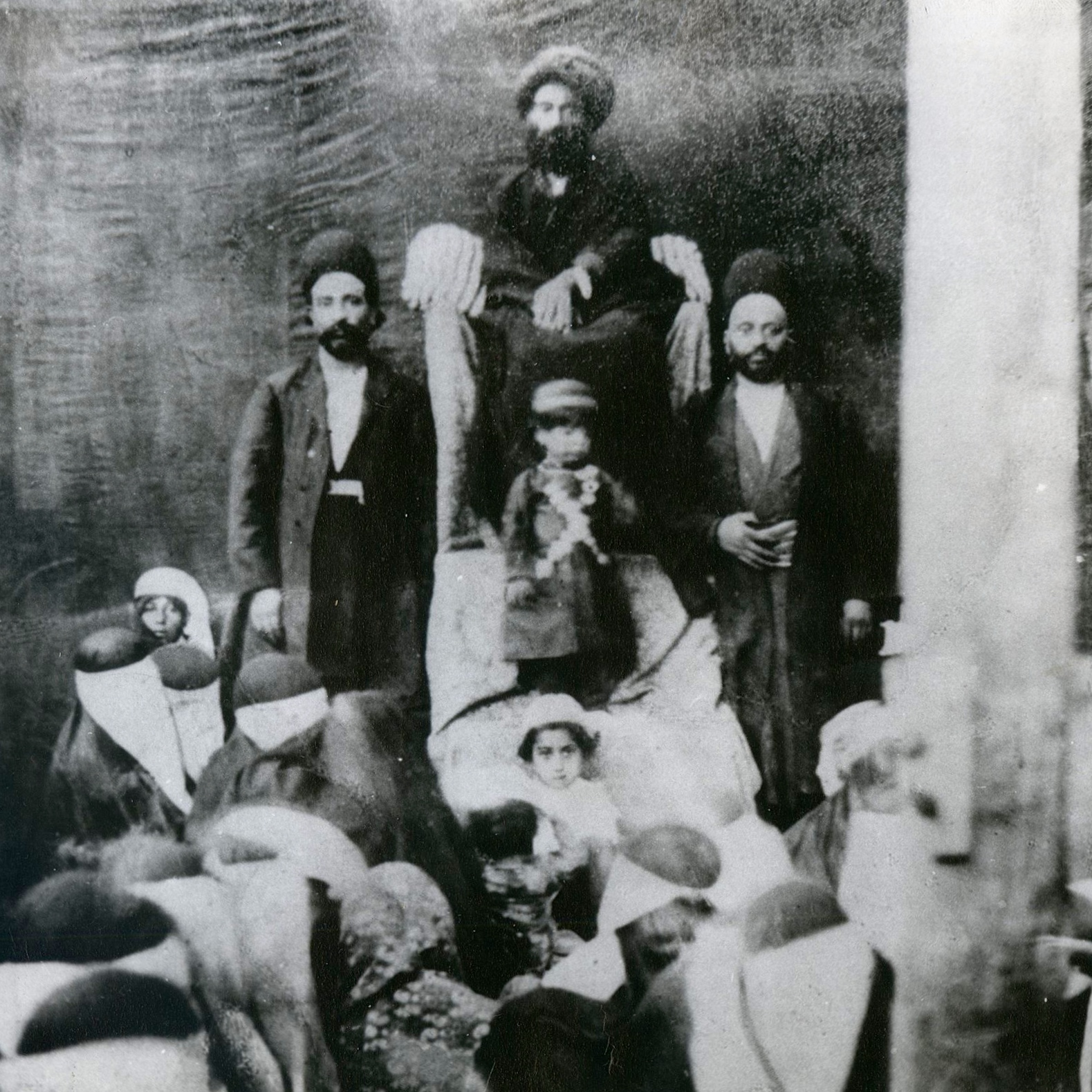
Haj Seyed Gholamhossein Majd Mojabi (above), pictured with Ahmad Shah Qajar, Shah (King) of Iran (center) and guards in 1901.

The Mojabi Shirazi or Mojabi family (Persian: مجابی, Persian pronunciation: [mojaːbi]) is a prominent Iranian family of cultural significance from Qazvin, Iran. Between 1908 and 1997, the family was associated with around 40 publications (comprising newspapers, magazines and pamphlets) in Iran.

== Family overview ==
As religious scholars, members of the Mojabi family held various minbars in Qazvin throughout the 19th and 20th centuries. The family also had considerable involvement in political and societal affairs in Qazvin and across Iran. During the late Qajar and Pahlavi eras, the Mojabi family pioneered the publishing houses and periodicals of Qazvin, a city famed for its political newspapers. Of these, Ra’d-i-Qazvin founded and edited by Ali Ra’d Mojabi, was the most long-standing of these periodicals, in print from 1933 to 1950 and was closed down on various occasions by Soviet forces during the occupation of northern Iran in the Second World War. During this period Ra'd was one of the most renowned periodicals throughout Iran.

Another newspaper, Salah-i-Bashar, founded and edited by Naguib Mojabi, ran from 1924 to 1934. Hojatoleslam Naguib ran the weekly journal with the assistance of Mirza Abutorab Sheikholeslami and Mirza Hossein Khayal. The most significant of the periodicals during the Pahlavi I (Rezā Shāh) era was the Bazpurs, which was in print for 12 years (1924-1936), owned and edited by Jafar Adib Mojabi. The focus of the Bazpurs was on societal issues. Other newspapers run by the Mojabi family included Nakhl-e Omid, Sarnevesht and Saadat Qazvin.

== Origin ==
The family name derives from Ibrahim al-Mujab, more commonly known as Mojab. He was the son of Mohammad al-Abid and grandson of Musa al-Kadhim. Those related to Mojab are therefore known by the surname Mojabi or descendants of Mojab. Mojab is buried in Imam Husayn Shrine, Karbala.

Members of the family are directly descended from the 7th Shia Imam Musa Al-Kadhim who is the son of Ja'far al-Sadiq son of Muhammad Al-Baqir son of Ali Zayn al-Abidin son of Husayn ibn Ali son of Ali Bin Abi Talib and the son of Fatimah the daughter of the Islamic prophet, Muhammad. Members of the family are called with the title Seyed which literally means Mister or Sir. As an honorific title, it denotes males accepted as the direct descendants of Muhammad.

== List of notable members ==
- Ali Ra'd Mojabi, owner and editor of Ra'd newspaper in Qazvin.
- Fathollah Mojab (born 1932), paleontologist.
- Ayatollah Gholamhossein Mojabi, cleric.
- Ayatollah Ali Mojabi, cleric.
- Hossein Mojabi (1944-1964), painter.
- Ibrāhīm Mojāb (c. 8th century), grandson of Musa al-Kadhim.
- Ayatollah Jafar Adib Mojabi (1895-1967), cleric, author and owner of Bazpurs newspaper.
- Javad Mojabi (born 1939), writer, poet, literary and art critic.
- Mehdi Mojabi, Iran University of Science and Technology professor and cultural heritage expert.
- Mohammad Mojabi (born 1965), politician and environmentalist.
- Puyan Mojabi, University of Manitoba professor and Canada Research Chair.
- Ayatollah Rahmatollah Mojabi, cleric.
- Shamseddin Mojabi (1939–2012), academic, government adviser and political activist.
- Shahrzad Mojab (born 1956), University of Toronto professor.
- Yahya Mojabi, traditional musician from the Qajar era who trained under Abdulkarim Jenab Qazvini.
- Zohreh Mojabi (born 1960), actress and playwright.
- Ayatollah Sultan al-Wa'izin Shirazi (1894-1971), Shia scholar and author of Peshawar Nights.
- Ata Mojabi (born 1982), filmmaker, and screenwriter.
- Zia Mojabi, Hollywood film director.
