= Farajollah Rasaei =

Iranian admiral (1908–2003)

Timsar Farajollah Rasaei
- فرج‌الله رسائی
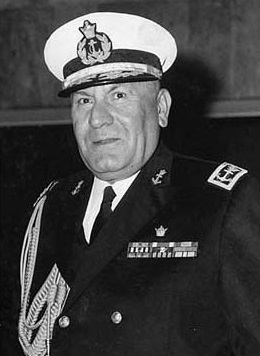
- Rasaei in an undated photo

Member of the Iranian Senate
- In office 5 October 1972 – 11 February 1979
- Preceded by: Mehrangiz Manouchehrian
- Succeeded by: Office Abolished
- Constituency: Tehran

Commander of the Imperial Iranian Navy
- In office October 1960 – 5 October 1972
- Monarch: Mohammad Reza Pahlavi
- Prime Minister: Jafar Sharif-Emami; Ali Amini; Asadollah Alam; Hassan Ali Mansur; Amir-Abbas Hoveyda
- Preceded by: Habibollah Shahin
- Succeeded by: Abbas Ramzi Attaie

Director of the Seventh General Directorate of SAVAK
- In office 12 March 1957 – September 1959
- Prime Minister: Hossein Ala'; Manouchehr Eghbal
- Preceded by: Office Established
- Succeeded by: Mohammad Ayromlou

Personal details
- Born: 1908 Bandar-e Anzali, Qajar Iran
- Died: 2 December 2002 (aged 94) United States
- Spouse: Farideh Rasai
- Children: three daughters
- Education: Dar al-Fonun; Accademia Navale

Military service
- Allegiance: Pahlavi Iran
- Branch/service: Navy
- Years of service: 1929–1972
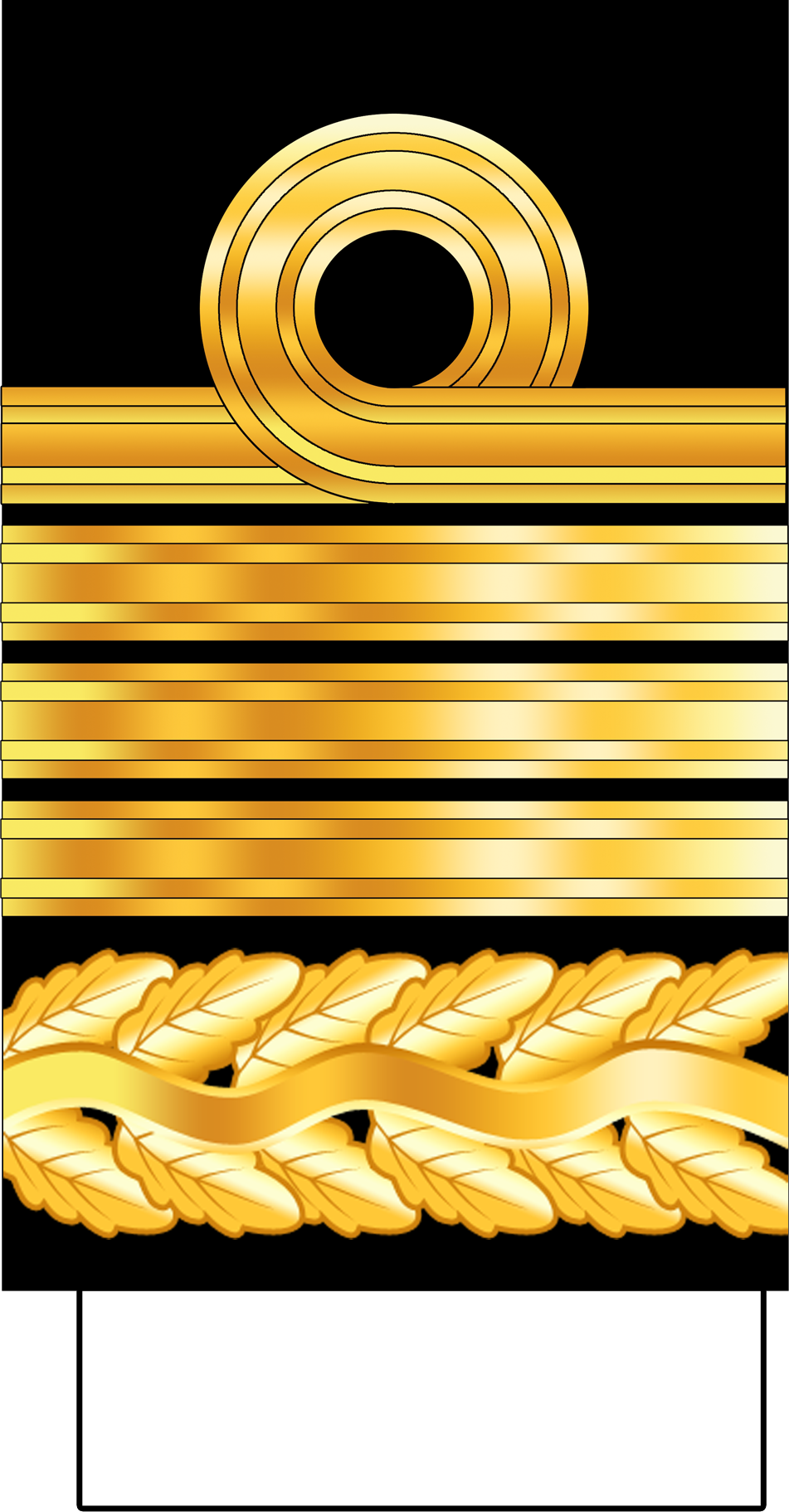
- Rank: Admiral
- Commands: Southern Fleet (1949–1959); Khorramshahr Naval Base; Shahbaz
- Battles/wars: World War II; Anglo-Soviet invasion of Iran; Joint Operation Arvand; Seizure of Abu Musa and the Greater and Lesser Tunbs; Dhofar rebellion

Farajollah Rasai (Persian: فرج‌الله رسائی, 1908 – 2 December 2002) was an Iranian naval officer and politician who served as the Commander of the Iranian Navy from 1960 to 1972.

Rasai joined the Navy in 1929 and was trained at Naval Academy of Livorno. Under his command, the Iranian Navy took control over the Abu Musa and the Greater and Lesser Tunbs islands 30 November 1971 from the Emirate of Sharjah. After he retired in 1972, he was an Iranian Senator until the Iranian Revolution when he fled Iran and lived in the United States until his death in 2002.

== Education ==
Rasai completed his primary education in Gilan and his secondary education at Dar al-Fonun in Tehran. In 1929, he entered the Iranian Navy as an officer cadet.

Rasai was sent to Italy with a group of other young officers to continue his military education. After graduating from the Italian Naval Academy, he traveled to the Persian Gulf aboard the ships purchased by Iran. He participated in the official ceremony marking the establishment of the Iranian Navy in the presence of Reza Shah and entered service in the Iranian Navy with the rank of Ensign.

== Military service ==
During the Anglo-Soviet invasion of Iran in August 1941, when Allied forces occupied Iran and inflicted considerable damage on the Iranian Navy, a number of Iranian naval officers were arrested. Rasai, then holding the rank of Lieutenant Commander, was among those detained. He was released from Allied captivity after a short period and subsequently became head of the Press Review Department of the Second Bureau of the Army General Staff, a position that required him to attend parliamentary sessions in the press gallery.

After Rasai was promoted to the rank of Captain, the military governor of Abadan was removed from office, and Rasai also assumed the position of military governor of Khorramshahr. In the same year, he became commander of the Southern Naval Force.

In 1959, Rasai was promoted to the rank of Rear Admiral and appointed head of the General Department of Conscription.

== SAVAK ==
From the establishment of SAVAK, Rasai was assigned to serve in the organization. He served as head of SAVAK's Seventh Department until 1960, when he returned to the navy.

== Command of the Imperial Iranian Navy ==
Rasai was subsequently promoted to the rank of Rear Admiral and, in 1960, became commander of the Iranian Navy. He held the position for twelve years. During his tenure, he was promoted to the ranks Vice Admiral and Admiral (Daryabod), the latter being equivalent to the rank of General (Arteshbod) in the Ground and Air branches of the armed forces. He was one of eighteen Iranian military commanders to attain this rank.

Admiral Rasai retired from military service in October 1972, and Abbas Ramzi Attaie succeeded him as commander of the navy with the rank of Rear Admiral.

== Dismissal and retirement ==
After a group of naval personnel stationed on one of the Persian Gulf islands reportedly suffered from a lack of food and received assistance from the crews of foreign vessels, orders were issued to retire older naval officers and replace them with younger, university-educated officers, who were temporarily granted higher ranks.

Rasai's retirement and the appointment of Abbas Ramzi Atai as his successor occurred as part of this process.

== Appointed senator ==
Following the resignation of Mehrangiz Manouchehrian as an appointed senator representing Tehran, her vacant seat was given to Rasai. At the age of 62, Rasai retired from military service in 1972 and remained a member of the Senate of Iran until the 1979 Iranian Revolution .

After the revolution, he left Iran and settled in the United States.

== Personal life ==
Farajollah Rasai was married to Farideh Rasai. They had three daughters, Rasa, Roya, and Rana, all of whom lived outside Iran.

Farajollah Rasai died in the United States in December 2002, at the age of 93.

== Dates of rank ==
Ensign	Lieutenant (junior grade)	Lieutenant	Lieutenant Commander	Commander
December 22, 1932	March 21, 1936	March 21, 1940	March 21, 1944	March 21, 1947

Captain	Commodore	Rear Admiral	Vice Admiral	Admiral
March 21, 1949	September 1954	September 1960	September 1963	June 1971

== Decorations and awards ==
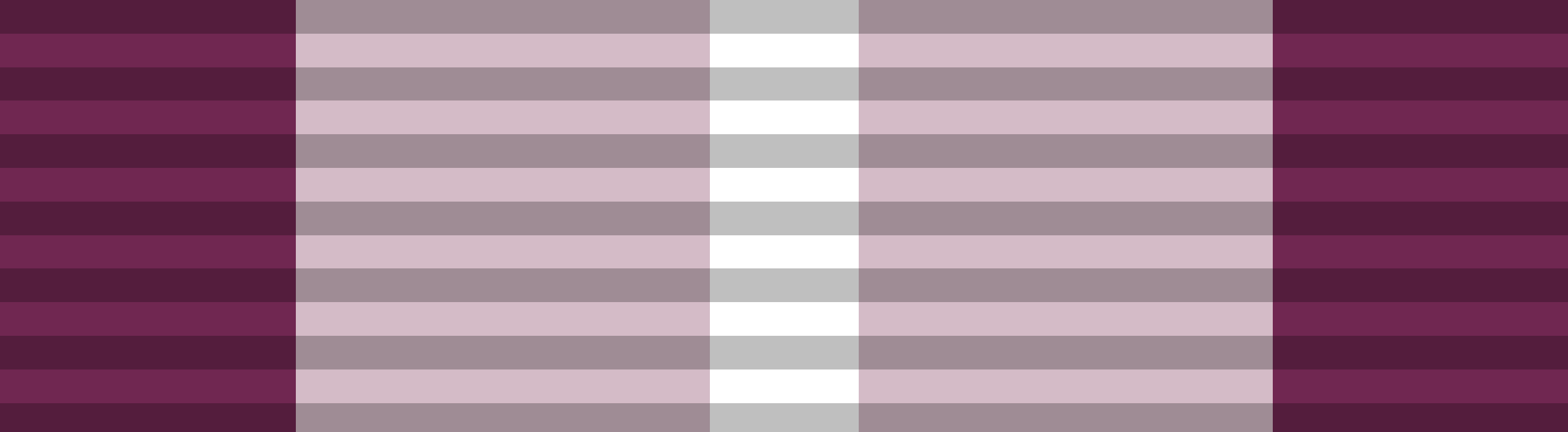
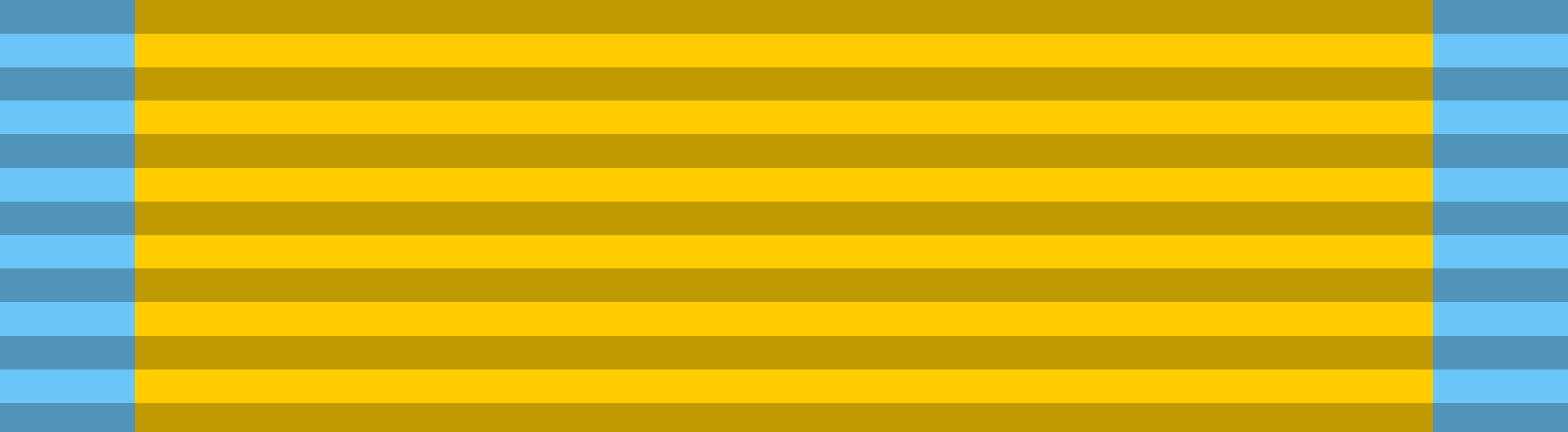
Order of Marksmanship (1968)
Order of the Coronation (1968)
Hilal-e-Quaid-i-Azam (1967)
Order of the Crown, 2nd Class (1966)
Légion d'honneur, Grand officier (1964)
Order of Homayoun, 2nd Class (1963)
Order of Service, 1st Class (1961)
Order of Resurgence, 2nd Class (1953)
Order of Paas, 3rd Class (1952)
Order of Honor, 2nd Class (1951)
Order of Service, 2nd Class (1960)
Order of Honor, 3rd Class (1945)
Order of Merit, 2nd Class (1945)
Order of Sepah, 3rd Class (1941)
Order of Merit, 3rd Class (1939)

Military offices
Preceded by Habibollah Shahin	Commander of the Imperial Iranian Navy; October 1960–5 October 1972	Succeeded by Abbas Ramzi Attaie
