= Nahal International Short Film Festival =

International film festival in Iran

- Location: Tehran, Iran
- Established: 2003

Nahal International Short Film Festival is a student festival dedicated to short films, which is held annually by students of Tehran University of Art. This festival hosts student short films from Iran and all over the world.

== History ==
This festival was founded in 2003 with the aim of creating a suitable and independent space for the presentation of experimental works and to pay attention to the various concerns and tastes of students. Since 2013, a ceremony has been held to commemorate one of the veterans of Iranian professional cinema, and since then Reza Nabavi, Kamran Shirdel, Ali Hatami, Sohrab Shahidsaless, Ali Loghmani, Bahram Dehghani, Kianush Ayari and Mohammad Reza Aslani have been honored and praised. In addition to this, the presence of some of the important figures of Iranian cinema such as Shahram Mokri, Shahab Hosseini, Hooman Seyyedi, Morteza Farshbaf, Roya Nonahali, Majid Barzegar, Ata Mojabi and Bahram Ark as jury and Workshop presenter added to the credibility of this festival.

The film event is organized by students of Theater and Cinema faculty, University of Tehran in collaboration with cultural deputy office of the university in 2 sections of Short Film as well as Scenic Photography and Poster with the former encompassing categories of Documentary, Fiction, Experimental Cinema, Animation and First Film Directors.

The duration of short films is confined to 30 minutes. Only students must be directors.
