= Women's Organization of Iran =

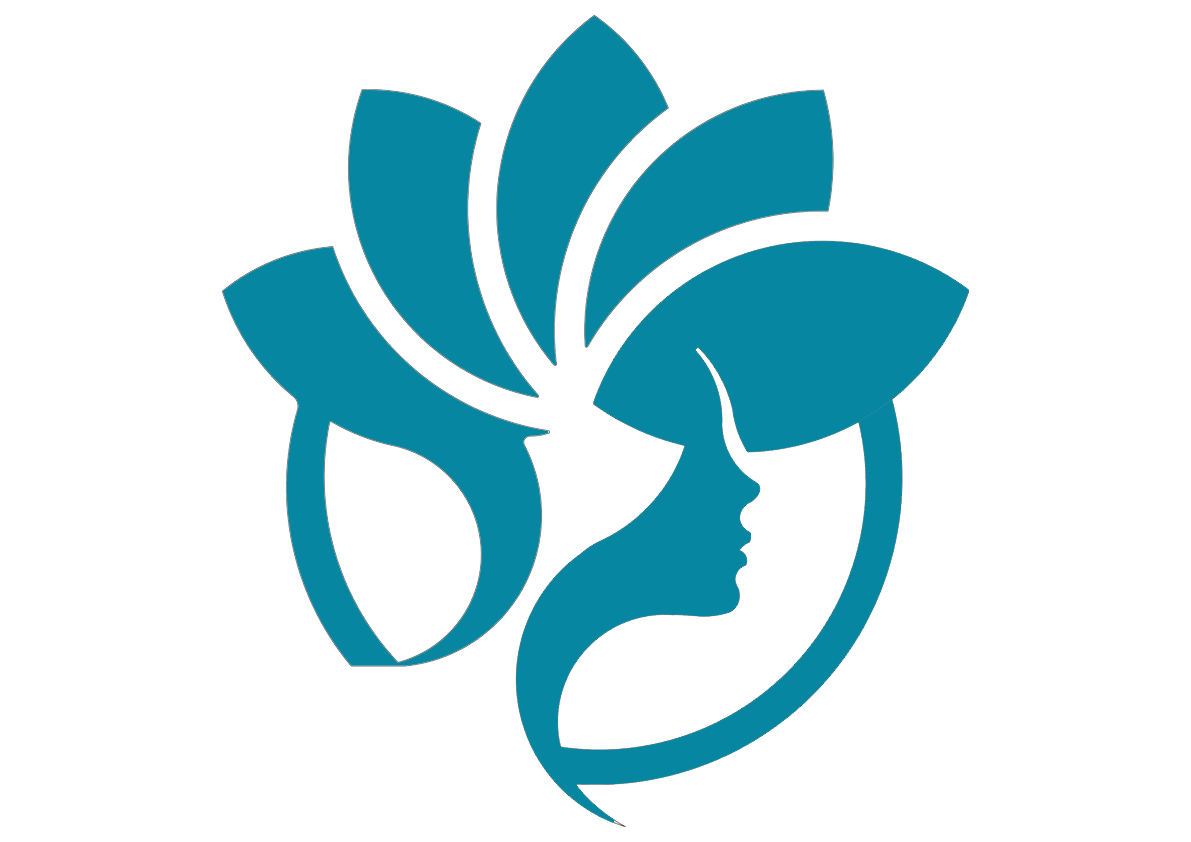

The Women's Organization of Iran (WOI; Persian: سازمان زنان ایران) was a non-profit organization created in 1966, mostly run by volunteers, with local branches and centers for women all over the country, determined to enhance the rights of women in Iran. The WOI had committees working on health, literacy, education, law, social welfare, handicrafts, international affairs, provincial affairs, membership and fund raising. Its Women's Centers provided literacy classes and vocational training, family-planning information and legal advice. By 1975, the International Year of the Woman, the WOI had established 349 branches, 120 women's centers, a training center and a center for research. It succeeded in making women's rights part of the national agenda, but was dismantled with the Islamic Revolution in 1979.

== Structure ==
Many women's organizations had emerged in the 1950s. In 1959, Princess Ashraf Pahlavi formed a committee to prepare the ground for an umbrella organization called the High Council of Women's Organizations of Iran (High Council). The High Council then coordinated the election of a 5,000-member assembly of women representatives, which approved the WOI and its charter on 19 November 1966 in Tehran.

The WOI had committees working on health, literacy, education, law, social welfare, handicrafts, international affairs, provincial affairs, membership and fund raising. The committees were generally chaired by upper-class women connected with the royal court. The branch members were generally middle-class women in their late twenties or early thirties, often teachers or civil servants. The WOI saw its function as that of connecting small groups of women leaders at the grassroots level, who were scattered throughout the country.

The basic unit of the WOI was a branch established in a locality where thirty women constituted the local assembly and elected a 7-member local board of directors, as well as a branch secretary. Branch secretaries met at the yearly National General Assembly, where goals and guidelines for the activities of the WOI were set. A central council of eleven members met weekly to manage the organization. The cadres worked on a voluntary basis except for some 40 women employees at the headquarters who were paid through funds from the printing company.

The WOI budget was initially provided by local charitable organizations, national fund raising and funds from the school textbooks printing company. As the WOI grew, it convinced the government that its services were necessary for national development, and should be funded by the government. The WOI came to have 2,000 paid specialists in legal, childcare and family planning.

== Strategy ==
During the 1960s, women in Iran, regardless of class and geographic location, were dealing with issues of freedom, equality, security, recognition and control, and were feeling torn between tradition and modernity, between what they aspired to and what their environment enforced. Members of the WOI came to the conclusion that neither Western feminist models nor traditional Iranian models provided a satisfactory framework for the Iranian women's movement and the role of women; they set out to develop local concepts and strategies to create new possibilities for the role women could play, the aspirations they had, without breaking away altogether from their culture.

Originally, the WOI reflected the commonly held view of the complementary of the sexes; and women's rights were requested for the stated purpose of improving their capacity as mothers and wives. In 1973, an ideological turnpoint happened at the General Assembly when Mahnaz Afkhami, then secretary general of the organization broke away from that viewpoint and said “We are each a whole human being, complete in ourselves. We are half of nothing and no one.” Consequently, the constitution of the WOI was amended to reflect this new demand for equality at all spheres, including within the family unit.

Overwhelmingly, Iranian women told the WOI that economic self-sufficiency was their first priority. In response, the WOI focused its activities on education, whether literacy skills or vocational training. The classes became the core of the WOI centers. Yet women were reluctant to train for many traditionally masculine fields, such as carpentry or plumbing, on the grounds that it would hurt their chance of marriage. Even after the franchise was won, the WOI determined that language or discourse was extremely importance because rights gained on paper did not amount to much when the language was still essentially patriarchal. In fact, the secretary general says she came to see her task as working to change the patriarchal discourse.

Conscious of the fact that Iran's leadership was very sensitive to its international image, the WOI worked to develop international connections with women's groups in countries such as France, Iraq, Pakistan, the Soviet Union and the People's Republic of China by exchanging, information, and moral support. Eventually, Iran also played a central role at the United Nations First World Conference on Women in 1975 in Mexico City, and formulated key concepts for its World Plan of Action. The WOI then used the World Plan to formulate and implement a National Plan of Action for Iran, and used it as a way to be involved with many government decisions and processes, even in matters not traditionally considered women's issues.

== Accomplishments ==
When the goals of the WOI coincided with the modernization of the country, it was able to make progress; however when it fought in the areas of family and social gender behavior, it often failed. A quota in technical and engineering fields was easily achieved, whereas the ability for women to obtain a passport without their husband's permission did not, and cost them the resignation of female senator Mehrangiz Manouchehrian as well as much negative publicity.

=== Women’s Centers ===
The WOI grew to include 120 Women's Centers, which were centers providing services to women. Local women were included in deciding what those services would be – typically classes, childcare, consciousness-raising, legal counseling and health care. The centers were essential in connecting with the grassroots, but were viewed by the WOI as a means rather than a goal in and of itself. When the centers came under attack for drawing women outside of the home, the name of the centers was changed from Women's Centers to Family Welfare Centers.

Trial and error showed that the most effective centers were those that were small, centrally located, unassuming and an integral part of the community.

WOI's School of Social Work, which trained employees selected from across the nation for work in the centers, was located in Naziabad, south of Tehran, one of the country's poorest communities. Young women chosen for this course were given two years of training before returning to their towns and villages. Schooling was kept at a minimum so that ties between the young women and their home network and lifestyle would not be permanently altered by long stays in Tehran.

=== Family Protection Law of 1975 ===
In the area of women's legal rights within the family, the Iran's Family Protection Law, as revised in 1975, gave women the right to ask for divorce on the same grounds and conditions as men, left decisions regarding child custody and alimony up to a special family court, recognized the mother as the legal guardian of her child in case of the father's death, practically eliminated polygyny by stipulating exceptional conditions and, limited legal marriages to a second wife only with the permission of the first, and increased the minimum age of marriage to eighteen for women and twenty-one for men. Abortion was made legal with the consent of the husband. Unmarried women could have abortions on demand up to the eighth week of pregnancy.

=== Research on Women ===
The WOI created a Center for Research on Women which conducted research on women in various socioeconomic and geographic sectors, and identified potential solutions to their problems. Various studies showed that improving women's status would result in general societal improvement, but that the reverse was not true (such as the mechanization of agriculture resulting in decreased financial and material standing for farm women because access to new methods was restricted to men).

Some of the more influential studies of the research center include :

- A Comparative Study of the Socio-Economic Situation of Working Women in Tehran Qazvin and Kashan (1974-5); this study showed the importance of using radio to reach women in these cities, and of providing childcare as a necessity for women's participation in the work force.
- Status of Women in Tribal Society (1974) showed that these tribal women aspired to urban non-nomadic futures for their children, and that women's rights in these tribes were based on tribal customs rather than Islamic or state law.
- Images of Women in Elementary School Textbooks showed that women's roles in society as portrayed in schoolbooks were rigid, limited and without variety. The study led to the creation of a committee to review and revise elementary school textbooks.
- Urban Design and Women’s Lives outlined suggestions for community services to help working mothers.
- A set of legal research projects focused on a comparative study of the laws of Iran and the Declaration on the Elimination of Discrimination against Women (CEDAW).
- The Saveh Functional Literacy Project, cosponsored by UNESCO in 1973-1975, whose goal was to increase the literacy rate of rural Iranian women. The project was then turned over to the National Committee for World Literacy Program, which used it as a blueprint for launching similar programs in more than 7,000 villages throughout Iran.

=== National Plan of Action ===
The WOI worked upstream of the UN's First World Conference on Women in Mexico City in 1975. To achieve a consensus on the National Plan for Action, more than seven hundred panels, organized and financed locally by the WOI chapters between 1976 and 1977, debated relevant issues. The panels were followed by statewide seminars in each province.

The General Assembly of the United Nations then adopted the World Plan for Action. Subsequently, the WOI took it back to Iran as a basis for preparing a National Plan of Action to improve the status of women in the country, and as a way of pressuring the government for resources. The final document of the National Plan for Action included not only the goals of improving the status of women, but also the mechanisms for implementing and monitoring this national agenda. The cabinet approved the National Plan of Action in May 1978. Putting women's rights issues on the national agenda was considered to be a major victory for the WOI; but the National Plan of Action was never implemented as the Revolution toppled the government.

== Relationships ==
=== Royal Family ===
The Iranian women's movement was very decentralized at the end of the 1950s, and fighting for the right to vote, when Princess Ashraf Pahlavi was asked to lend her support to the movement. She then commissioned a committee to federate the organizations into the umbrella High Council of Women's Organization of Iran. She became a valuable ally and an effective lobbyist in high-level government meetings. As honorary president, she was able to appoint half of the members of the central council of the WOI; it was remarked she had made sure to appoint women from diverse backgrounds and religions.

The queen Farah Pahlavi became a feminist in the early 1970s, and her support was sought on certain issues, such as eliminating sexist images from elementary-school textbooks. But her feminist views often clashed with the public motherly persona she felt she needed to convey to the country.

The King Mohammad Reza Pahlavi is partly remembered for his legacy for women's rights, however, the demands of the WOI were more radical than the reforms that the state was willing to make. The WOI became more influential as it grew, as it was able to successfully implement projects, and as it became able to offer the infrastructure of a network of active women throughout the country. The Ministry of Labor agreed to supply equipment and teachers as they determined it was preferable for Iranian women to take on jobs that would otherwise fall to foreign workers. And the Ministry of Health agreed to provide medical staff and supplies in women's centers.

Though WOI members were prohibited from political activities, the WOI closely cooperated with women Majles deputies and senators and the New Iran Party on women's issues. It was accused of acting for the government when no other independent women's organization was allowed to exist, and when branches of theWOI around the country encouraged women to participate in Rastakhiz Party activities.

=== Religious establishment ===
The relationship between the WOI and the religious establishment was never an easy one. Religious fundamentalists opposed the WOI because it went against their interpretation of Islam, and because the WOI supported moving family jurisdiction out of religious purview and into the hands of special family courts. Many women at all levels in the WOI also did not want to have to choose between growth and progress, and their religion. While leaders of the WOI believed in the possibility of being concurrently a Muslim and a feminist, it did not believe full human rights could be obtained within “Islamic feminism” The WOI tried to gather support from liberal mullahs or the participation of their female relatives at local women's centers. For instance, in Qom, the participation of Ayatollah Shariatmadari's daughters was essential to the viability of the local women's center. Some centers also included religious instruction and the reading of the Qur'an to appease the local clergy.

In general, the WOI tried to avoid confrontation with religious figures. Among its strategies were:

- quotations from the Qur'an in support of women's rights, such as “Whoso doeth good works, whether male or female, and he (or she) is a believer, such will enter paradise and they will not be wronged the dint of a date stone.” (from Sura Nisa’)
- female role models among the prophet's family as heroines for women's rights, such as Zainab bint Ali and Khadijah bint Khuwaylid
- consultations with liberal religious leaders to word proposals. For instance, the Iran's Family Protection Law of 1975 was worded such that divorce (a man's right) was given by him to his wife as part of the marriage contract.

=== Revolution ===
Two main political forces were behind the Islamic Revolution that overturned the Shah; both were opposed to the WOI. For the leftists, the liberation of the masses took precedence over women's liberation. For the religious fundamentalists, the work of the WOI was contrary to their interpretation of Islam.

Women massively participated in the demonstrations leading up to the revolution. Ironically, the WOI's activities in the late 1960s and 1970s contributed much to women's sense of agency, their awareness of their collective political power, and their belief that they should mobilize and assert their demands. Women were marching for a freer government; what came about was the Islamic Revolution, the dismemberment of the WOI and a massive step back in women's rights.

== Chronology ==
- 1959: The High Council of Women's Organizations of Iran (High Council) is formed with 17 member organizations focused on women's issues; its first priority is gaining the right to vote
- 1966: The High Council organizes the election of a 5,000 member assembly of women representatives from all regions of the country
- 19 Nov 1966: The assembly of member representatives from the High Council meets in Tehran and approves the charter creating the Women's Organization of Iran (WOI); 55 existing women's organizations join the WOI.
- 1970: The Association of University Women becomes affiliated with the WOI
- 1971: Mahnaz Afkhami becomes secretary general of WOI; she remains in the post until the Islamic Revolution.
- 1971: The WOI and the Ministry of Health organize a six-day women's family planning conference. The legal age of marriage was discussed and recommendations were made on raising it for women.
- 1972: The WOI committee studying the family protection law of 1967 recommended amendments to do with child custody, joint ownership of family assets, and payment of alimony to divorced women.
- 1973: The Association of Women Lawyers criticizes the family protection law of 1967 for allowing men to take a second wife and for depriving a wife with the right to ask for a divorce if her husband suffered from a contagious disease.
- 1973: The WOI changes its mission to reflect that it no longer believes the role of women is to complement men; the new mission calls for equality in society and before the law. The WOI constitution is also changed such that members of the central council are now elected rather than half being appointed by the honorary president.
- 1975: [Iran's Family Protection Law|The Family Protection Law] passes, expanding women's rights in the family.
- 1975: The WOI holds a conference to mark the 40th anniversary of the unveiling of women in Iran and the beginning of the UN International Women's Year. The same year it passes an 11-point resolution which called for the ‘complete elimination of discrimination against women and equal opportunity and welfare for women from all walks of life.’
- 1978: The cabinet approves the National Plan of Action

== Selected members and leaders ==
- Dr. Mehrangiz Manouchehrian, appointed member of the central council
- Dr. Sakineh (Simin) M. Redjali, Secretary General of the Women's Organization and appointed member 1969 - 1971
- Dr. Alam, president of the central council of the WOI
- Princess Ashraf Pahlavi, Shah's twin sister, founding president
- Fakhri Amin, appointed member of the central council
- Farangis Shahrokh (Yeganegi), prominent Zoroastrian feminist, first secretary of the high council
- Farrokhroo Parsa, member of the central council, also minister of education
- Ferideh Diba, the queen's mother, founding vice-president
- Mahnaz Afkhami, secretary general of the WOI, also Minister for Women's Affairs
- Dr. Mehri Rasekh, prominent member of the Bahai community, member of the central council of the WOI
- Nikchehreh Mohseni, appointed member of the central council, of the Baha’i faith
- Parvin Buzari, appointed member of the central council
- Ms. Shamsi Hekmat, Jewish educator, member of the central council and later deputy secretary general of the WOI
- Vida Behnam, appointed member of the central council

== See also ==
- Iranian Women's Movement
