= 1869 in Iran =

- Decades
- See also: Other events of 1869; Years in Iran

The following lists events that happened during 1869 in Qajar era.

== Incumbents ==
- Monarch: Naser al-Din Shah Qajar

== Births ==
- April 1 – Samad Khan Momtaz os-Saltaneh, Iranian diplomat and politician.
- June 16 – Muhammad Hussain Naini, Iranian Islamic scholar.
- ? – Faramarz Asadi, Iranian politician.
- ? – Moayed-ol Mamalek Fekri Ershad, Iranian artist, journalist and playwright.
