= Mehrangiz Manouchehrian =

Iranian lawyer, musician, feminist and appointed Senator

- مهرانگیز منوچهریان
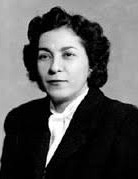
- Manouchehrian in 1978

Member of the Senate of Iran
- In office 1963–1972
- Succeeded by: Farajollah Rasaei
- Constituency: Tehran

Personal details
- Born: 1906 Mashhad, Sublime State of Persia
- Died: 5 July 2000 (aged 94) Tehran, Iran
- Resting place: Behesht-e Zahra
- Party: Independent
- Education: University of Tehran

Mehrangiz Manouchehrian (Persian: مهرانگیز منوچهریان; 1906 – 5 July 2000) was an Iranian lawyer, musician, feminist, and appointed Senator. She was involved in the Women's Organization of Iran. She was involved in drafting the Family Protection Act - a set of laws extending women's rights in marriage.

== Legacy ==
Manouchehrian's contribution to an improvement of women's rights in Iran are acknowledged. A book about her life "Senator: the Work of Senator Mehrangiz Manouchehrian in the Struggle for Legal Rights for Women" won the Latifeh Yarshater Book Award in 2004.

== Career ==
Manouchehrian was both Iran's first female lawyer and Iran's first female Senator. During her time as a Senator she was crucial in extending women's rights. Using her experience as a lawyer, she drew up the Family Protection Act, which granted women family rights. A number of elements in the proposed Act were picked out and greatly exaggerated by critics. This led to the Act becoming subject to great public debate and discussion in the media. Some members of the country's clergy claimed that the Act was not compatible with Islam, espoused loose moral standards and even considered publicly denouncing Manouchehrian as a heretic. Fearing for her safety, Manouchehrian fled Tehran for some time. The Act was later repealed following the 1979 Islamic Revolution.

Manouchehrian later resigned her seat in the Senate following a dispute with the Prime Minister Jafar Sharif-Emami. After Sharif-Emami addressed her in a rude manner during a parliamentary debate, he visited her home and apologised privately. However, Manouchehrian demanded a public apology which he refused to deliver. Consequently, Manouchehrian resigned.

For her work in promoting women's rights, she was awarded the United Nations Prize in the Field of Human Rights in 1968.

Manouchehrian was also appointed a member of the central council of the Women's Organisation of Iran.

== See also ==
- List of first women lawyers and judges in Asia
