= Kambiz Yeganegi =

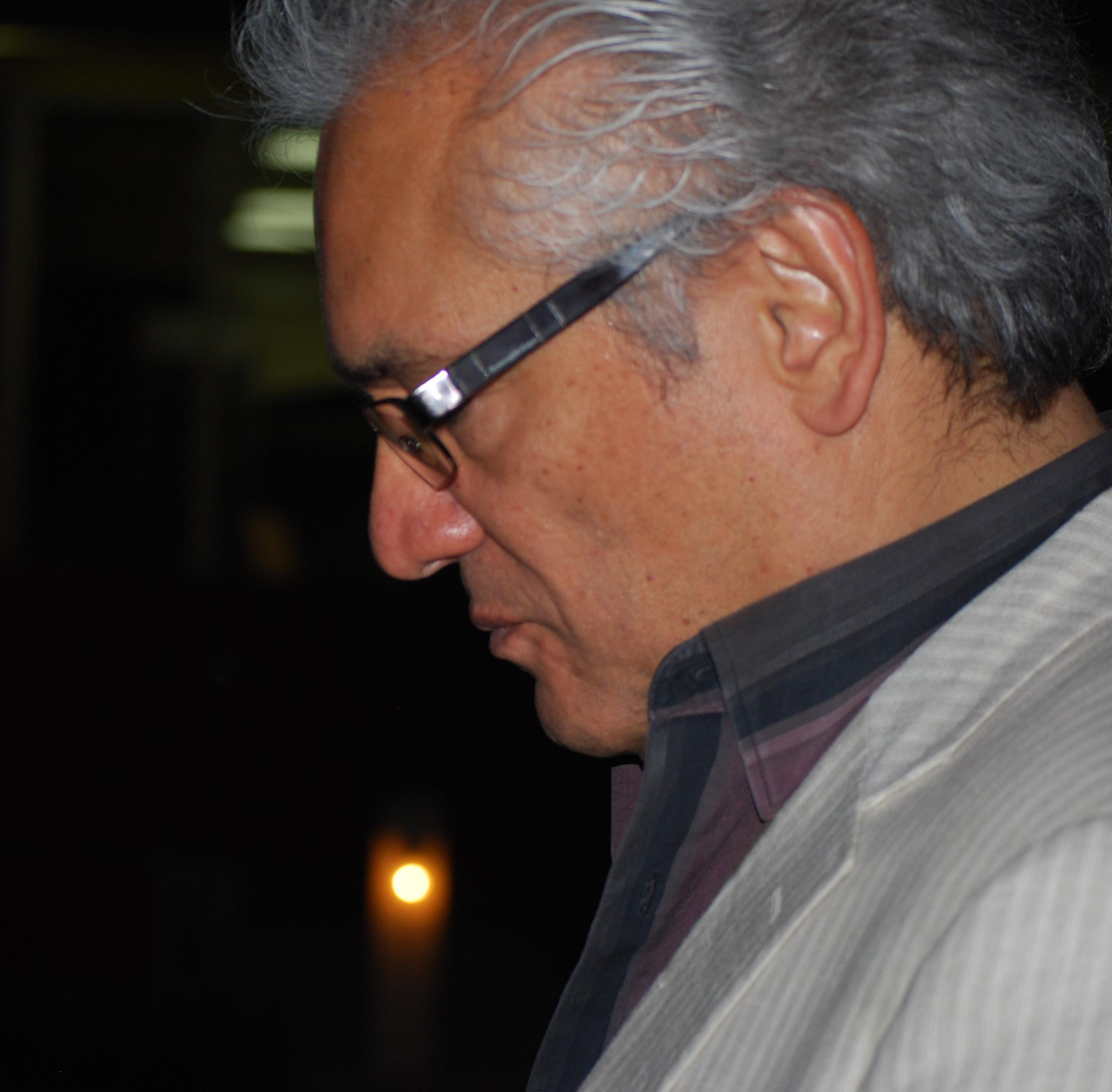
- Born: June 1, 1948 (age 78); Tehran, Iran
- Years active: from 1967
- Known for: Entrepreneur, Father of cognitive science coaching in Iran
- Children: 3
- Parent(s): Farangis Yeganegi, Ardeshir Yeganegi

Kambiz Yeganegi (Persian: کامبیز یگانگی, Born June 1, 1948 in Tehran, Iran) is an Iranian Entrepreneur and Applied Cognitive Science Coach.

== Family ==
His father, Ardeshir Yeganegi, was the founder of the first Modern Iranian leather processing and manufacturing factory in Hamedan, Iran. During the early 1950s he was a pioneer in the leather industry. He was also founded and built the first water energized power plant named "Abbas Abbad" in the early 1950s which is now a tourist site in Hamedan, Iran.

Kambiz's mother, Farangis K.Shahrokh Yeganegi, was the first senior director of the Women's Organization of Iran during the 1960s, founder and first director of The Zoroastrian Women's Organization, founder and first CEO of Iranian Handicraft Industries, a division of the Ministry of economy in the early 1970s. Farangis Built the Ardeshir Yeganegi Library in Tehran. This Library which has been modernized specializes in rare ancient Iranian History and culture books.

== Quick Facts ==
Kambiz Yeganegi graduated with a degree in Business Administration at Los Angeles.

He was a co-founder and senior vice president of Dasht Morghab company, an agro-industry, which became the leading manufacture of canned, bottled and frozen food products in Iran offering the famous 1&1 (Yek-o-Yek) brand, during the 1970s.

Kambiz, was the Innovator, founder, and first CEO of a leading consumer products distribution company by the name of "Pakhshe Saraasari Iran" or the "Trans Iranian Distribution Network Inc." in 1977. The company owned and built warehouses and depots throughout Iran, developed a national sales division and owned a fleet of distribution trucks.

Kambiz Yeganegi, became quite interested in the newly emerging field of Cognitive Science, after taking a variety of self development courses in the early 1980s studying many books and publications in that arena. He began designing his own applied CS courses and experimenting their effectiveness in the early 1990s. After observing the Methodologies, surprisingly impactful transformative results on himself and on the people who volunteered for the test courses, he offered his first independent interactive courses with a new approach to coaching methods in 1993 in Tehran after which time this start-up grew into an organization focusing on communication and applied Cognitive Science for adding velocity to the transformation process based on the principle of creating more "Balance" in life. This organization is called "Besooye Taddol Institute" which translates into "Toward Balance Institute", and it was officially registered in 2014, in Iran. over 30000 Participants have completed the various courses that the institute offers.

Kambiz Also Chairs a Company that manufactures environment friendly insecticides, pesticides located in Eyvanki, Iran. This Company is called Afandshimi inc. and produces Anti-Rodent and pesticides products.
