= Javad Mojabi =

Iranian poet, writer and researcher (1939–2026)

- جواد مجابی
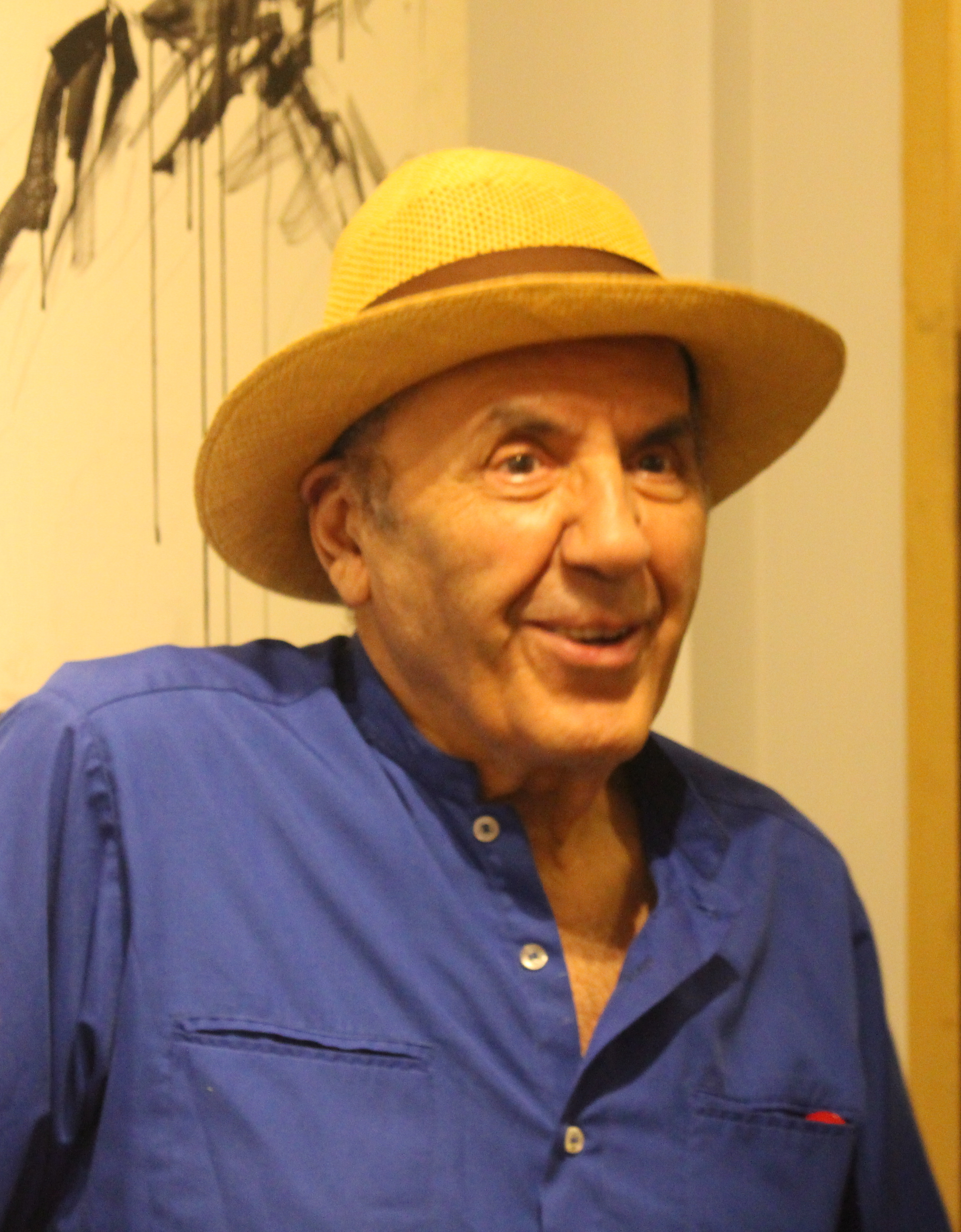
- Born: 19 October 1939; Qazvin, Iran
- Died: 4 September 2026 (aged 86)
- Citizenship: Iranian
- Education: University of Tehran
- Occupations: Poet, writer, researcher, painter and literary critic
- Spouse: Asie Javadi
- Children: Poupak and Hosein
- Website: www.javadmojabi.ir

Javad Mojabi (Persian: جواد مجابی; 19 October 1939 – 4 September 2026) was an Iranian poet, writer, researcher, and literary and art critic. He is one of Iran's most prominent modern writers and poets, and published over 50 literary works in various forms. Mojabi also wrote hundreds of critical works and essays on art and culture in journals and magazines. He began writing poetry in the 1960s, along with short story writing and research on modern painting in Iran.

A well-known satirist, the poet is close to Nima in style but mostly inclined to Shamlou in blank verse. Mostly focusing on social themes, Mojabi is a poet of philosophy and thought, which he sweetens with a blend of satire. He employs the meter but omits it when it prevents him from expressing his thoughts. He has a daughter, Poupak, on whom he bases some of his works. He had previously criticised the censorship process in Iran.

== Life and career ==
Javad Mojabi was born on 19 October 1939 in Qazvin, a neighbourhood that was commonly known by his family name, Mojabi. Due to his father's employment, Mojabi spent his early years living in Alamut, but completed his final years of schooling in Qazvin. In 1958, he was accepted to the University of Tehran to study Law. His brother Hossein, who was a painter died in 1963, aged just 19. Following his bachelor's degree, Mojabi went on to earn a Doctor of Philosophy degree in Economics.

For 19 years he worked for the Ministry of Justice, before being appointed a cultural expert at the Ministry of Culture and the Arts. In parallel, he worked as a professional journalist, and served as cultural editor at Ettela'at newspaper between 1968 and 1978. Later, he was involved with literary magazines including Ferdowsi, Jahan-e Noh, Khooshe, Adineh and Donya-e Sokhan for which he served as editor. In early 1978, along with his colleagues at Kayhan and Ayandegan – including Amid Naeini, Mehdi Sahabi, Firouz Gouran, Sirous Alinejad and Mohammad Ghaed – he formed the Foundation for Independent Journalists. This group ceased functioning in 1979 following the Iranian revolution.

His published writings include over fifty works, consisting of eight collections of poetry, four collections of short stories, nine novels, several plays and films, and children's stories and satirical books and several biographical works on writers and poets on Iran's literary scene. In addition to publishing poems and novels and stories, his work over the last fifty years has focused on the visual arts, including modernism over six volumes, and analysis of the life and works of painters and sculptors.

He was married to Nastin, and has two children, Poupak and Hossein.

Mojabi died on 4 September 2026, at the age of 86.

== Works ==
=== Poems ===
- Fasli Barayeh To (A Season for You)
- Zoubini bar Qalbeh Paiz (A Spear to the Heart of Autumn)
- Parvaz Dar Meh (Flying in the Fog)
- Bar Bameh Bam (Over the Bam)
- Safar-hayeh Malaheh Roya (The Journeys of the Sailor of Dreams)
- Poupakaneh (Like Poupak)
- Sheidai-ha (Of Being madly in Love ... )
- Shereh Bolandeh Ta'amol (The Long Poem of Reflections)
- Sher-hayeh Man-o-Poupak (My Poems and Poupak's)

Sample Poems

- In An Isfahan Morning, Translated to English by M. Alexandrian

Your name to the wind I bestow,
And your body's white music also,
In the bush,
At night,
I remembered you,
Brimful of songs of drunkenness,
I arise,
In an Isfahan morning.
Your name has survived in my book
With this dervish's broken handwriting
On the azure tablet.

- Before the Moon-rise

Before moon-rise,
Bring me wine, O dear,
So that in the gaze of sleep
In the redness of my wine
- Like your name -
You will arise naked.
Now you are more naked than the moon,
Under the banner of the night
A wine drinking moon.

- Under the Low Ceiling

Chairs arrive from the jungle
To the veranda,
So that I can sit in the jungle.
Sip a mouthful of wine
To your memory, the loveliest stars,
My earthly mother!
With its sharp chips,
This old jungle
Tears up within the distance of wound and the rust.
- Do you hear the news?
- No.
- Do you see?
- Yes.
Behind a paper cloud
A man with the blind man's spectacle,
Looks after one within a printed paper;
The quail sings - at Azadi Cafe -
The plectrum of her song,
Circles
On the sterile flowers,
On bold letters of the world,
On cigarette smoke,
On frozen fingers.
Your name has been lost,
On the unreadable marble sentence,
On the pale blue veins of the stone,
And I can't find
Save the image of a gun on the marble,
The horse of your image has been saddled,
And your name takes root in the depth.
I will return,
I must return
In spring.
Under the shallow ceiling
Somebody here in the red twilight
Has drunk a cup;
Somebody has laughed unguardedly here,
Death in the scull,
Musician insects
With their tiny larynxes
Sing of sorrow;
From somewhere,
The lute of a soldier, scatters the light notes
In Azadi Cafe.
Put the red chairs
In the veranda.
Rain is falling.

- The Voyages of the Sailor of Fancy

Arise,
Arise colorless birds of flight,
On the bitter coast of exile;
The sadness of birds in the world
Call for witchcraft
With waters which not a moment remain hoisted from repeating raising,
This moon, whirling the moon around my head,
Drives my heart to the law of madness.
The world devours the drunken ship
To the extreme end of wandering.
Let us arrive before a gale
For the dark and just sea
Reverberates under the snorting trumpet of whales and the curtains of the mermaids,
The mermaids of former voyages
Are calling me again
Towards another fancy.
Since I grew young from the delightful cloudy hue
In its jujube red umbrella of kisses;
And I rose victorious,
And left this realm
And marched to the mysterious corners of the waves,
And a butterfly
Carried my red intelligence from my head
With its violet and white wing
Beyond adventure.
Twist me o fair mermaid,
All the water in the world gushes form your mouth;
It is this,
This moment,
This fearless twisting,
Who have closed eyes to all
And turned your face from fear!

- The butterfly's wing

Only your voice
Has survived
Of all the sounds in the world
Here
Where bloody winged birds
Have formed my sky.
I cross from the plain of your voice,
Headlong and dancing,
The fairies of alphabet,
Dancing in a dialect which has ravished me.
They have made me thirstier for that clear naked spring,
That shadowy meadow,
To hang my head like newly blossomed fruit,
Beside others' heads
On that tree branches.
You look at my imaginations in the spring
Which has now been converted
Into your sweet voice.

=== Short stories ===
- Mano Ayoubo Qoroub (Me & Ayoub & Sunset)
- Katibeh (Relief)
- Divsaran (Div-like)
- Az Del Beh Kaqaz (From Heart to Paper)
- Qeseyeh Roshan (The Clear Tale)
- Stories for Children
- Pesarakeh Cheshm Abi (The Blue-eyed Boy)
- Sibo Va Sareh Kouchoulu (Sibo & Little Starling)
- Panir Balayeh Derakht (The Cheese on the Tree)
- Khane-am Daryast (The Sea is My House)
- Narges Dar Ayeneh (Narcissus in the Mirror)
- Kashki (I Wish ... )

=== Novels ===
- Borj-hayeh Khamoushi (The Silent Towers)
- Shahr-Bandan (The Siege of the City)
- Shabeh Malakh (The Night of the Locust)
- Obour Az Baqeh Qermez (Passing through the Red Garden)
- Ferdowseh Mashreqi (Eastern Paradise)
- Mumyai (The Mummy)
- Jim (The Letter J)
- Lotfan Dar Ra Bebandid (Close the Door, Please)
- Yeki va An Digari (The One & The Other)
- Satire & Satirical Sketches
- Yad-dasht-hayeh Adameh Por Modea (The Notes of Pretentious Man)
- Ahay Zouzanaqeh (Mr. Trapezium)
- Shabahat-hayeh NaGozir (Inevitable Similarities)
- Majmoei Az Tarh-hayeh Jedi va Tanz-amiz (A Collection of Serious & Satirical Sketches)
- Yad-dasht-hayeh Bedouneh Tarikh (Notes Without Date)
- Nish-khandeh Irani (Iranian Cynical Smile)

=== Essays and research ===
- Shenakht-nameyeh Shamlou (Biography of Shamlou)
- Shenakht-nameyeh Saedi (Biography of Saedi)
- Tarikheh No-Pardazaneh Honar-hayeh Tajasomi Iran (History of Iranian Modern Visual Arts), 6 volumes
- Tarikheh Tanzeh Adabi Iran (History of Literary Satirical Works in Iran)
- Sayeheh Dast (Signature, a collection of some essays, published in journals & magazines)
- Moqadameh Bar Chandin Majmoue-yeh Naqashi Modern (A Collection of Introductions for a Number of Books on Modern Painting in Iran)

=== Plays and screenplays ===
- Shabaheh Sobh-dam (Sodom's Spirit)
- Rouzegareh Aqleh Sorkh (Age of Red Wisdom)
- Mehman-Kosh (Guest-Killer)

=== Translations of Mojabi's works ===
- Into Polish: the short story “Lawinowy Pieczar Bahman” (Persian original: Eshkaft-e Bahman) appeared in the anthology Kolacja cyprysu i ognia. Współczesne opowiadania irańskie (Dinner of the Cypress and Fire. Contemporary Iranian Short Stories) which was selected and rendered into Polish by Ivonna Nowicka, Krajowa Agencja Wydawnicza, Warszawa 2003.

== Sources ==
- چند شعر از جواد مجابی
- ساختار اشعار جواد مجابی
