= Farangis Yeganegi =

Farangis Yeganegi (Shahrokh)
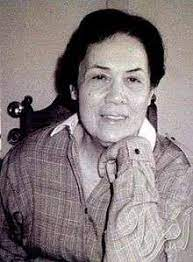
- Born: 11 May 1916; Tehran, Iran
- Died: 13 February 2010 (aged 93); California, United States
- Education: University of Tehran; USC Suzanne Dworak-Peck School of Social Work
- Known for: Founder of Iranian Handicrafts Organization; Assistant Secretary General of Women's Organization of Iran
- Spouses: Ardeshir Yeganegi; Aspy Engineer
- Children: Firoozeh, Parviz and Kambiz Yeganegi
- Parents: Keikhosrow Shahrokh (father); Firoozeh Farrahi (mother)

Farangis Yeganegi (Shahrokh) (Persian: فرنگیس یگانگی) (11 May 1916 Tehran – 13 February 2010 California) was the Founder and Director of Iranian Handicrafts Organization. She was also Assistant Secretary General of Women's Organization of Iran. She has built a library in Tehran and named it after her deceased husband,"Ardeshir Yeganegi".

== Life ==
Farangis Yeganegi was born in 1916 in Tehran. Her father Keikhosrow Shahrokh was the Zoroastrians representative in Iranian's parliament, and her mother was Firoozeh Farrahi. Yeganegi started her primary education in Iran school which was for Zoroastrian pupils. She then graduated from sage American College in Tehran. She received her Bachelor of Arts degree from the College of Literature at the University of Tehran. After that she traveled to United States and continued her education at USC Suzanne Dworak-Peck School of Social Work, obtaining her Master's degree. In 1933 she married Ardeshir Yeganegi, the couple had three children named Firoozeh, Parviz and Kambiz. She later married the Indian Air Marshal and ambassador to Iran, Aspy Engineer.

== See also ==
- Keikhosrow Shahrokh
- Women's Organization of Iran
- Women's rights movement in Iran
