= Abbas Ramzi Attaie =

Iranian naval commander (1928–2018)

Timsar Abbas Ramzi Attaie
- عباس رمزی عطایی
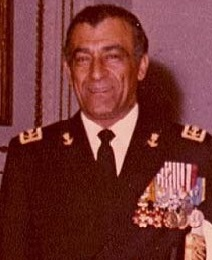
- Attaie in the 1970s
- Born: 1928; Khorramshahr, Pahlavi Iran
- Died: 26 October 2018 (aged 89–90); United States
- Military career
- Allegiance: Pahlavi Iran
- Branch: Navy
- Service years: 1947–1976
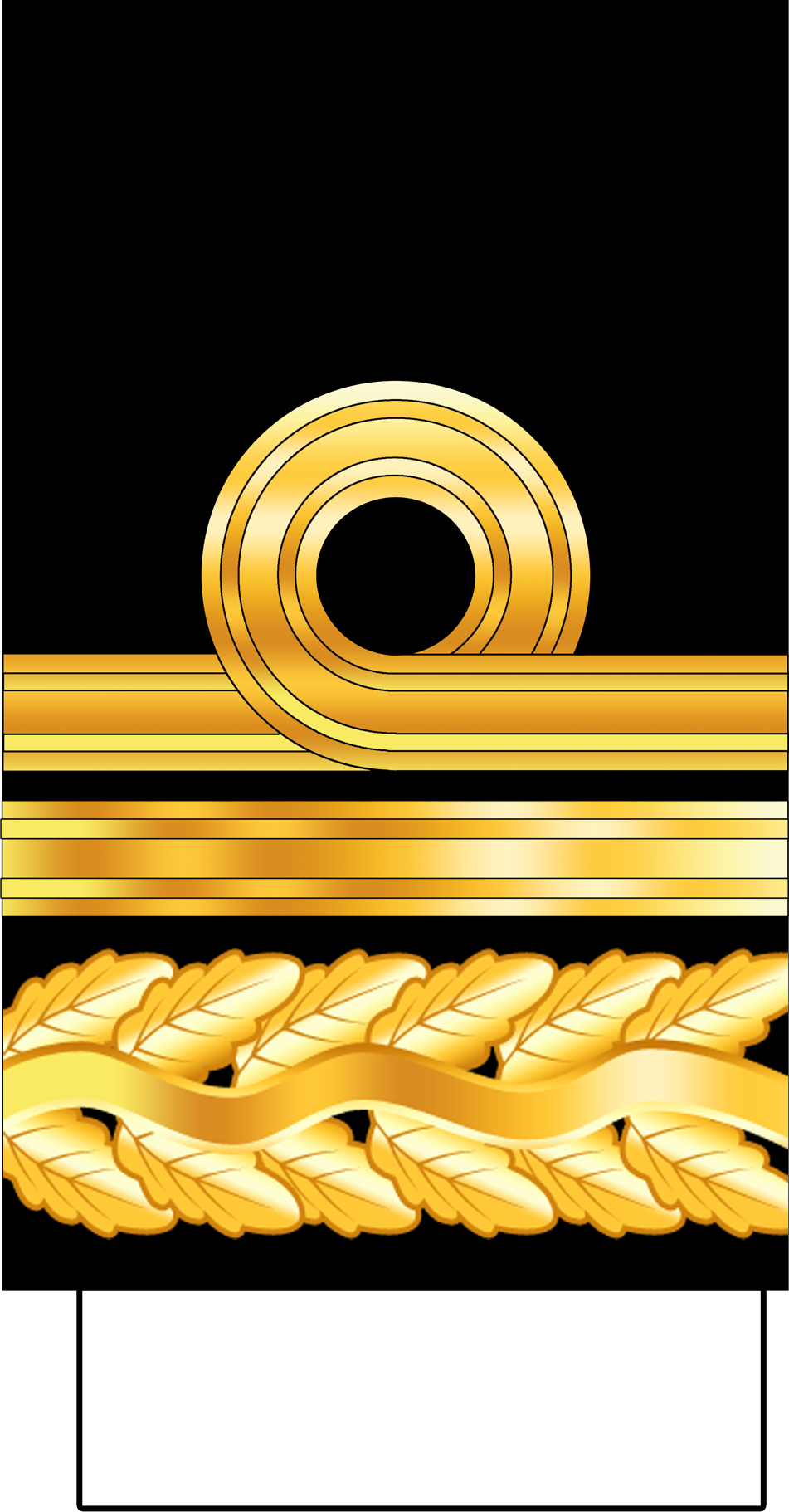
- Rank: Rear Admiral
- Commands: Imperial Iranian Navy (1972–1976); Southern Fleet (1969–1972)
- Conflicts: Joint Operation Arvand; Seizure of Abu Musa and the Greater and Lesser Tunbs; Dhofar rebellion; Second Iraqi–Kurdish War; 1974–1975 Shatt al-Arab conflict

Abbas Ramzi Attaie (Persian: عباس رمزی عطایی) was an Iranian Rear Admiral and Commander of Imperial Iranian Navy from 1972 to 1976.

== Biography and family ==
Abbas Atai was born in 1928 and was the fourth of five sons in his family. His father was an employee of the oil company in Abadan and came from a family of religious scholars in Qolhak, Tehran. His mother belonged to the Feyli tribal family of Ilam.

He began his education at Razi Elementary School in Abadan. Following the Allied invasion of Iran in August 1941 and the death of his father, he moved with his family to Tehran, where he attended Alborz School, Dar al-Funun, and completed his final year of secondary education at the Military School.

After receiving his diploma, he joined the Iranian Navy. Following a four-year course at the Naval College, he went to Britain and returned to the Iranian Navy with the rank of Sub-Lieutenant. He also completed courses in artillery and naval warfare in the United States.

== Crossing the Arvand River following the border dispute with Iraq ==
On April 15, 1969, the Iraqi Deputy Foreign Minister summoned the Iranian ambassador in Baghdad and stated that the Iraqi government considered the Shatt al-Arab a part of its territory. Iraq demanded that ships flying the Iranian flag on the waterway lower their flags and that any Iranian naval personnel aboard leave the vessels. Iraq threatened to forcibly remove Iranian naval personnel and prevent ships bound for Iran from entering the Shatt al-Arab.

Following Iraqi threats to attack any Iranian ship on the Arvand River that did not fly the Iraqi flag, Iran decided to give a firm response.

On April 22 and 25, 1969, two Iranian vessels, Ibn Sina and Aryafar, sailed under the Iranian flag through the Arvand River, escorted by an Iranian gunboat commanded by Commander Abbas Ramzi Atai and supported by the Iranian Air Force. They traveled approximately 90 miles along the waterway and reached the Persian Gulf without incident.

Commander Atai reportedly stated:

“I will stand on the deck, salute, and go all the way down the Arvand to see who will stop me.”

The Iraqis, despite their threats, ultimately took no action, and the ships safely passed through the Arvand River.

Commander Atai's courage during the operation, which became known as the Arvand Joint Operation, contributed to his subsequent advancement. Following the retirement of Admiral Farajollah Rasaei in October 1972, Atai was promoted two ranks to Rear Admiral and appointed commander of the Imperial Iranian Navy.

In an oral history interview conducted by Harvard University, Atai recalled that, while serving as chief of staff of the Imperial Navy Fleet, he volunteered for the operation after discussing it with General Gholam Ali Oveissi. Following the Shah's approval, he and a number of volunteers from the Navy proceeded through the Arvand River despite Iraqi threats.

He recalled that the volunteers were prepared either to sacrifice their lives for Iran or to establish the right of Iranian vessels to pass through the waterway under the Iranian flag. According to Atai, after the operation, ships bound for Iran continued to pass through the waterway with Iranian pilots and under the Iranian flag.

General Fathollah Minbashian, then commander of the Third Army, recalled meeting Atai before the operation. When Minbashian warned him that Iraqi forces might fire seven missiles at his vessel from the vicinity of Khosrowabad, Atai reportedly replied that the sacrifice of one Bayandor was worth a hundred men like him, referring to Admiral Gholam-Ali Bayandor and his brother Yadollah Bayandor.

== Financial corruption charges and conviction ==
Following his dismissal and arrest on charges of financial corruption in 1976, Atai was stripped of his military rank.

On February 21, 1976, a military court convicted him of bribery, abuse of authority, and fraud, stripped him of his rank, and sentenced him to imprisonment.

Atai was transferred to prison in the winter of 1976–77 to serve his sentence for bribery and financial corruption. He was released in the spring of 1978. Later that year, dissatisfied with the treatment he had received, he permanently emigrated to the United States.

In an interview with Shahla Haeri as part of the Harvard Iranian Oral History Project, Atai rejected the corruption allegations as baseless and attributed them to jealousy and secret plots by others.

Kamal Habibollahi, the last commander of the Imperial Iranian Navy during the Pahlavi era, gave a sharply different account. He claimed that Atai had advanced through the ranks through deception and, while serving in senior positions, had accepted large amounts of bribes with the cooperation of influential individuals.

Hassan Toufanian, however, stated that the Shah later told him that he had been mistaken about Atai and that the accusations against him were untrue. Toufanian also described Atai's financial condition in the United States as extremely poor, stating that he was struggling to afford basic living expenses and that his wife had divorced him.

== Atai's description of Mohammad Reza Pahlavi ==
Atai spoke highly of Mohammad Reza Pahlavi, describing him as exceptionally patriotic and deeply attached to Iran.

He stated that he had met many people throughout his life and had never seen such patriotism in anyone's eyes as he had seen in the Shah's. He also described the Shah as gentle and modest when speaking in private.

According to Atai, Mohammad Reza Pahlavi was receptive to logical arguments and would accept a position if it was demonstrated to him through reason.

Atai described him as:

“A very compassionate man, very devoted to his country, and very patriotic.”

Military offices
| Preceded by Farajollah Rasaei | Commander of the Imperial Iranian Navy; 5 October 1972–7 January 1976 | Succeeded by Kamal Habibollahi |
