= Danesh (science magazine) =

1882 Persian-language science magazine

Dāneš
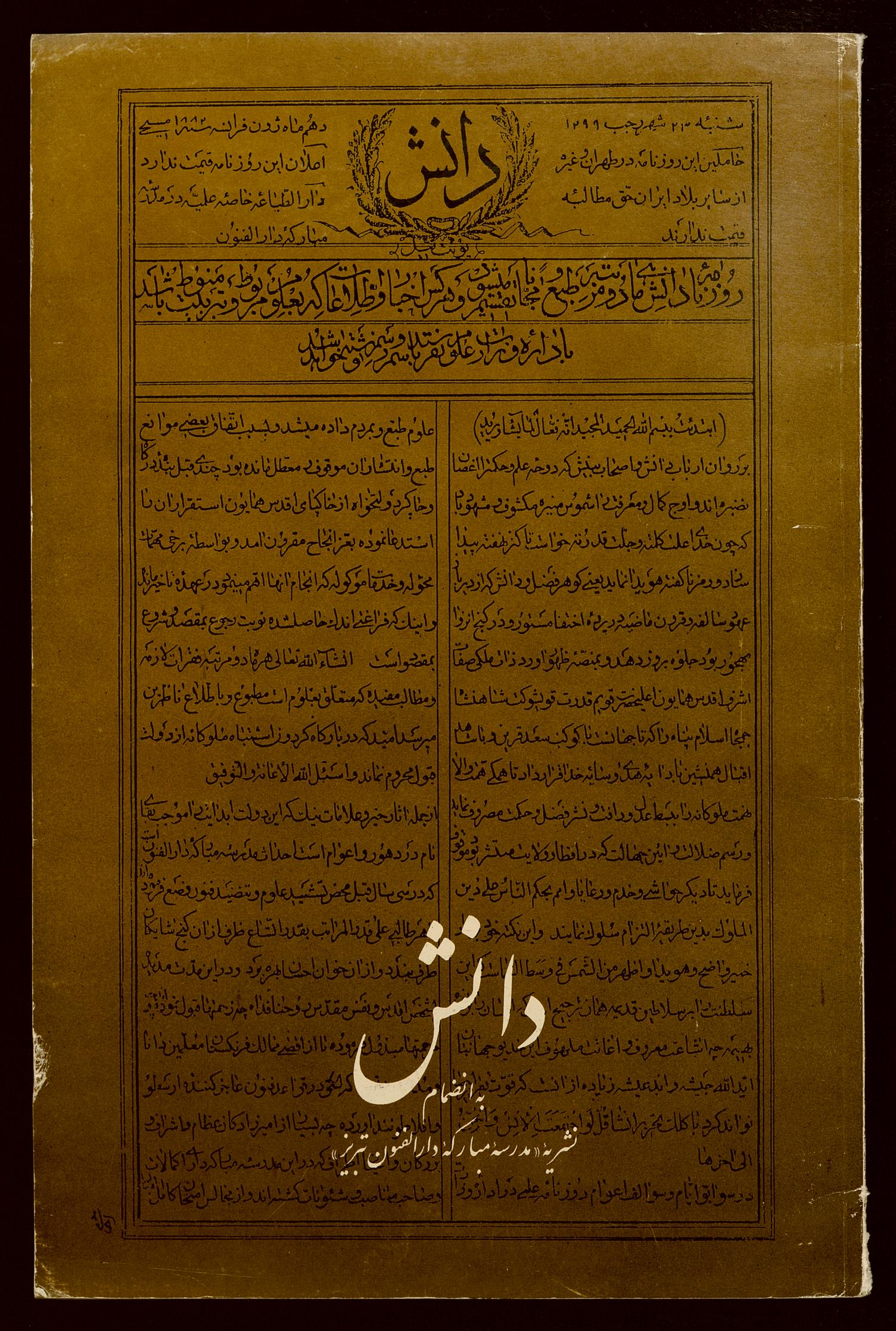
- Categories: Science
- Frequency: Biweekly
- Publisher: Dār al-fonūn
- Founded: 1882
- Country: Iran
- Based in: Tehran
- Language: Persian
- Website: Dāneš

Danesh (Persian: دانش; Deutsche Morgenländische Gesellschaft: Daneš; English: "knowledge") is the title of seven different Persian-language magazines published since 1882. This biweekly science magazine was the first one published in Tehran by the University of Dār al-fonūn in 1882.

By order of the Minister of Science 'Alīqolī Khan Moḵber-al-Dawla, who worked under Nāṣer-al-Dīn Shah (1264–1313 / 1848–96), a total of 14 issues were edited.

Dānesh was the first free-of-charge magazine in Iran which offered free advertising as well. The magazine probably aimed to close the gap caused by the closure of the well-known science magazine Rūz-nāma -ye'elmī. The leading editor was Moḥammad Kāẓem, a science teacher at Dār al-fonūn, who had studied in Europe. In addition to Kāẓem, other teachers also published articles on scientific and medical topics and their own opinions. Moreover, the magazine was considered to be a mouthpiece of the Ministry of Science.
