= Shamsi Hekmat =

Iranian Jewish reformist (1917–1997)

- Born: 1917; Tehran, Iran
- Died: July 2, 1997 (aged 79–80); Los Angeles, United States
- Other name: Šamsi Morādpur Hekmat
- Occupations: Social activist and founder of many socialist organizations for upliftment of women
- Known for: First Iranian Jewish women's organization (Sazman Banovan Yahud i Iran)

Shamsi Hekmat or Šamsi Morādpur Hekmat (1917 – July 2, 1997) was an Iranian woman who pioneered reforms in women's status in Iran. She founded the first Iranian Jewish women's organization (Sāzmān-e bānovān-e Yahud-e Irān) in 1947. She migrated to the United States and established the Iranian Jewish Women's Organization of Southern California to help poor families and students.

== Biography ==
Hekmat was born in Tehran in 1917. After her studies at the American School, she did her graduation from the Sage College in Tehran. She founded the Hekmat International School (1950–79) in Tehran, was its principal and owner. In 1947, Hekmat's student Parvin Hakim, who founded the Bashgah-e khaharan, had requested Hekmat to establish a Jewish women's organization to create awareness among Jewish women in specified disciplines. As a result, along with nine others, Hekmat founded the Jewish Ladies' Organization of Iran (Sāzmān-e bānovān-e Yahud-e Irān; 1947–79). Under the auspices of this organization five daycare centres became operational in poor Jewish settlements in various parts of the country; these centres provided free "education, clothing, food, and shelter" to poor children. The organization also promoted education of grown up people and their vocational training, and extended assistance during natural calamities. Hekmat called this organization as a "miracle or a revolution in the social life of Iranian Jewish women". As a member of central committee of the Women's Organization of Iran (WOI) (which had been established by Shah of Iran in 1966), she was instrumental in getting for Jewish women their inheritance rights in the community. She also spoke at the United States Jewish Association in USA. She also attended, as a representative of the Jewish community, the conference of the U.N. Commission on the Status of Women in Tehran.

Following the Iranian Revolution she migrated to the United States in 1979. She was not happy in leaving as she said "For the first two years in the United States I practically didn't leave the house. I was very unhappy. I had not wanted to leave". Nevertheless, she was grateful for the freedom that the U.S. provided. In fact, declassified documents reveal that she was the one woman among a delegation of 10 Iranians to the White House who facilitated a solution to stop President Carter's executive order to deport Iranians. In the US she established the Iranian Jewish Women's Organization of Southern California which provided financial assistance to poor people and students. Her other notable activities are related to: Starting of the "Persian Friends Chapter of the City of Hope" in 1981 as a fund raising movement to help the City of Hope Medical Center; creating the "Haifa Group" of the Beverly Hills Chapter of Hadassah in 1982. For these contributions, in 1989, she was awarded the Honorary Life President of Hadassah.

== See also ==
- List of Iranian women activists

== Sources ==
- Afary, Janet (9 April 2009). Sexual Politics in Modern Iran. Cambridge University Press. ISBN 978-1-107-39435-3.
- Chamanara, Sohrab (16 March 2015). 2020: The fall of Islamic States & the rise of a new political order. Ketab.com. ISBN 978-1-59584-500-9.
- Cowen, Ida (1971). Jews in Remote Corners of the World. Prentice-Hall. ISBN 978-0-13-509265-1.
- Las, Nelly (1996). Femmes Juives Dans Le Siècle. Hebrew University of Jerusalem, Avraham Harman Institute of Contemporary Jewry. ISBN 978-965-90054-1-3.
- Sarshar, Houman (2005). Esther's Children: A Portrait of Iranian Jews. Center for Iranian Jewish Oral History. ISBN 978-0-9661291-3-7.
- Steltzer, Ulli (October 1988). The new Americans: immigrant life in Southern California. NewSage Press. ISBN 978-0-939165-06-3.
