= Shamseddin Mojabi =

Iranian academic and politician (1939–2012)

Seyed Shamseddin Mojabi (1939 – 29 April 2012) was an Iranian academic, government adviser and political activist. Mojabi was arrested twice by SAVAK in 1963, and following his release left Iran to study and later work in France for 14 years. During the Iranian revolution he would return to Iran where he would work as a professor of civil engineering at the Amirkabir University of Technology (formerly Tehran Polytechnic).

== Early life and education ==
Mojabi was born in 1939 into a religious family in Qazvin. His father Seyed Ziaedin was a well-known merchant in the Caravanserai of Sa'd al-Saltaneh. In 1949, Mojabi's father moved the family to Tehran. The family's residence was in Baharestan Square which in the 1940s and 1950s was the epicentre of political activities. In those years Shamseddin began his political activity in the Third Force, and later in the neighbourhoods committee of the National Resistance Movement.

Mojabi studied at the Dar ul-Funun, where he gained a diploma in Mathematics. After gaining his diploma, he went to Teacher Training College, and in 1957 and 1958 was employed by the Ministry of Culture as an elementary school teacher. In 1959, Mojabi ranked first nationally in the Concours for civil engineering, and won a place at Tehran Polytechnic. At university, he met Dr. Abbas Sheibani and Morteza Hajizadeh and continued his political activities. In this period the Freedom Movement of Iranian Students became active, and his interest and familiarity with political issues led to him joining the movement's Political Committee, led by Rahim Ataei.

== Political activism and arrest ==
At Tehran Polytechnic, as Mojabi was the valedictorian certain teaching responsibilities were passed to him, and he would use university facilities to distribute Imam Khomeini's announcements. The Political Committee of the Freedom Movement, whose job was to check the news and political information, had a meeting on 22 May 1963. The meeting for the first time took place at the house of Ahmad Sayyed Javadi, who at that time was the Prosecutor of Tehran. Individuals including Saeed Mohsen, Mohammad Hanifnejad, and Mohammad Mehdi Jafari were present at the meeting. Jafari had contacts within the nomadic tribes of Southern Iran, and in March and April 1963, he visited southern Iran on various occasions. For SAVAK, who were observing him, this was suspicious. On the night of the meeting Jafari returned from the South, and SAVAK agents followed him. At midnight the house was sieged and all the participants were taken to SAVAK's detention centre in Tehran. 12 people were arrested, and Mojabi was amongst them.

While in prison Mojabi suffered from heart problems but owing to the presence of fellow inmates Dr. Sheibani and Dr. Azar, his friends ensured his health did not deteriorate. At the same time, John F. Kennedy was assassinated. Using this opportunity, Mojabi and others sent a protest letter to the police chiefs stating, "if we are to be executed, then execute us now, if you have no intentions with us, then free us so we can continue with our education". After some time the prisoners were released by the Tehran Prosecutor on the condition they did not leave the country. Some of the leaders of the Freedom Movement were released, but soon after were under arrest again. After his release he returned to Tehran Polytechnic and completed his studies. Upon graduation, with the intervention of Ali Akbar Moinfar, Mojabi was brought into the Engineering Ministry Program, later renamed the Ministry of Housing.

== Life in France ==
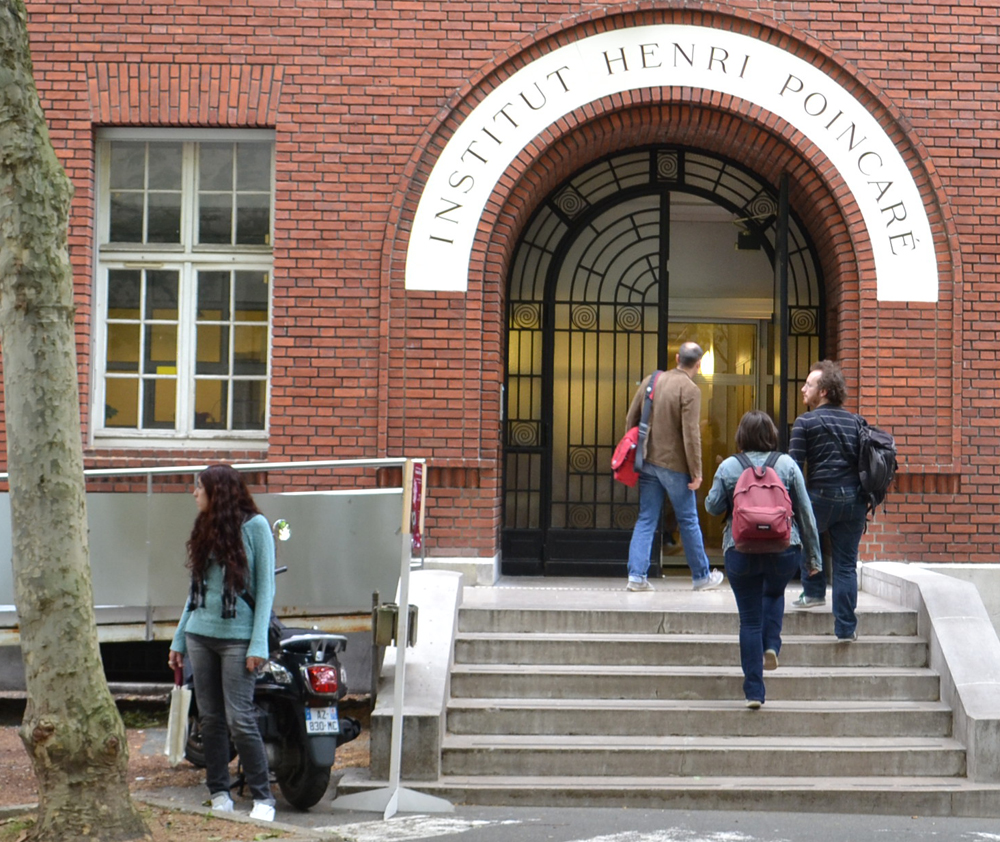
The Institut Henri Poincaré, where Mojabi studied as a postgraduate.

Mojabi initially travelled to London to have heart surgery, and to enroll at a university. There Mojabi managed to find a heart specialist who could carry out the operation, however as the operation in the UK was very costly, Mojabi travelled to Paris.

Mojabi enrolled at the Sorbonne in the Faculty of Sciences at the Institut Henri Poincaré, and became engrossed in his studies. In France he was able to use his previously unused insurance premiums for pay for his hospital costs. For 9 months, until August 1965 Mojabi remained in hospital. Whilst in hospital he studied and following his release passed two pre-doctorate diplomas in Applied Mechanics and Thermodynamics. This allowed Mojabi to enrol in the doctorate program. After 3 years, Mojabi completed a doctorate with a "Très honorable avec félicitations" distinction in 1967, with a PhD entitled "Buckling of reinforced concrete columns hinged at both ends".

During his studies, the Comité Euro-International du Béton (CEB), which his university professors had recommended him for, hired him. There the President of the organization, Professor Jacques-Ramsay Robinson, noticed his abilities and they began to work together.

In France, Mojabi was one of the leaders of the Union of Islamic Students Association in Europe – and was active in this group alongside Hassan Habibi, Sadeq Tabatabaei, Javad Ezhei, Karim Khodapanahi and Abolhassan Banisadr. Mojabi, in addition to Abolhassan Banisadr, Sadegh Ghotbzadeh, Mozaffar Firouz, Ahmad Ghazanfarpour were a group of Iranian residents in France who advised Khomeini.

== Return to Iran ==
With the return of Mojabi to Iran in 1978, a new chapter in his life commenced. In this period he returned to academia, and after 14 years away from his homeland became familiar once again with the political and social issues of Iran. In late May 1978 with the order of Abolhassan Banisadr and with the excuse of the Cultural Revolution universities in Iran were suspended and Mojabi returned to Paris with his wife and children and did not return until October 1979. After returning to Iran and the reopening of universities, and whilst working at the National Iranian Oil Company (NIOC), Mojabi continued teaching in the universities.

Following the revolution, Mojabi attempted to run for candidacy for the Qazvin seat of the 1980 Iranian legislative election, however as an Independent candidate lacked the institutional support of other candidates.

Later, during the Iran–Iraq War, Mojabi would play a vital role in working for the NIOC, and for the Ministry of Defence where under the direction of Akbar Torkan, Mojabi was involved in projects such as the design of underground hospitals and other defence structures or military buildings.
