= Moayed-ol Mamalek Fekri Ershad =

Iranian artist, journalist and playwright (1869–1916)

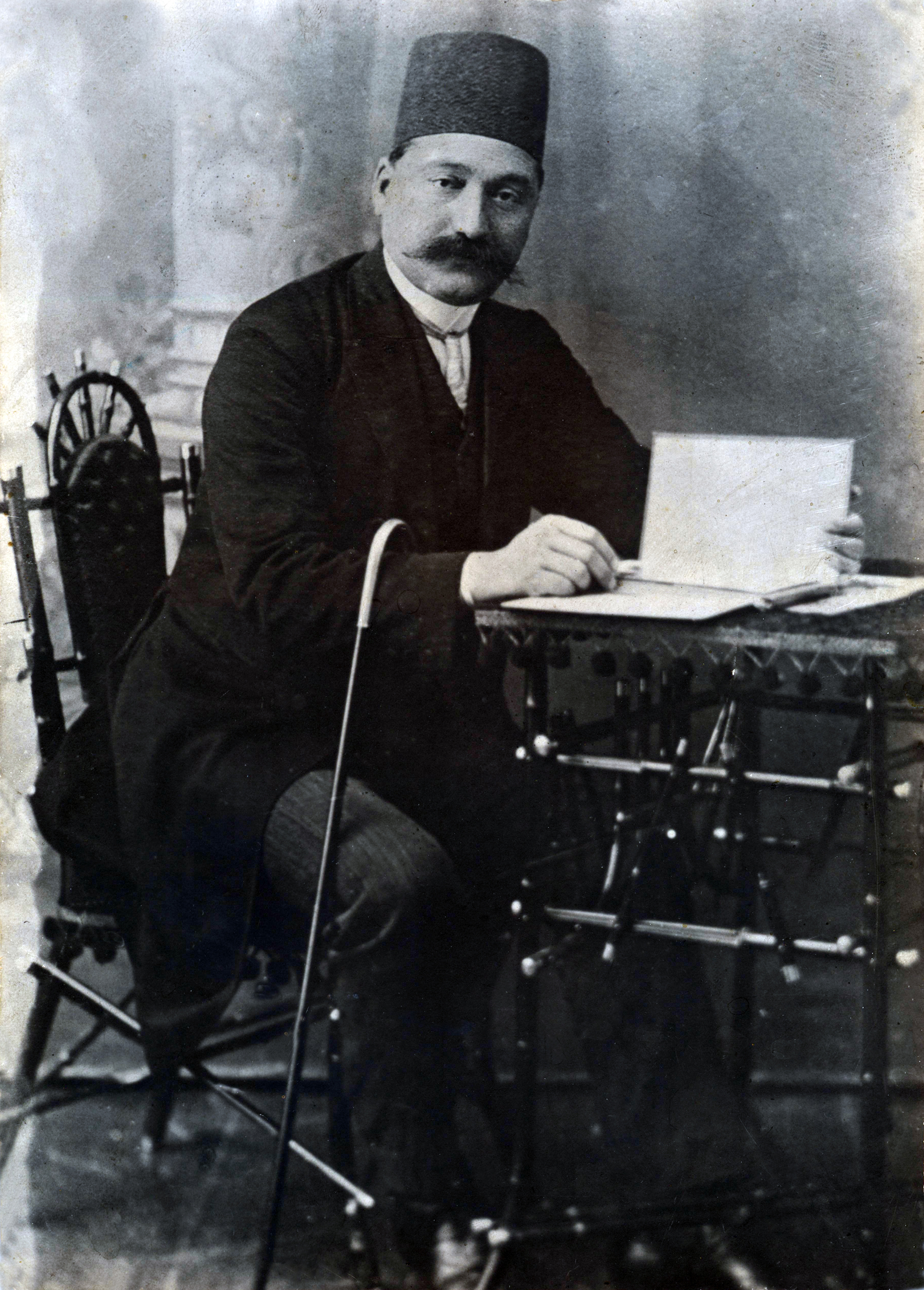
Moayed-ol Mamalek Fekri Ershad, Tehran

Moayed-ol Mamalek Fekri Ershad (Persian: مؤیدالممالک فکری ارشاد; 1869–1916) was an Iranian journalist and playwright. He was born in Tehran and studied in Dar ul-Funun. In the time of constitutional movement in Iran he was a supporter of this movement and when the Persian Constitutional Revolution happened, he was 37. In this time he was the editor of Sobhe Sadegh, a political and revolutionary newspaper. He was arrested in 1908 after the coup d'état of Mohammad Ali Shah Qajar. He was also a playwright and wrote several plays in which he criticized politicians of his time.

== Some of his plays ==
- Old Statesmen, New Statesmen
- The Story of a Journalist
- Love in the Old Age
