= Mohammad Mojabi =

Iranian environmentalist and politician (born 1965)

Seyed Mohammad Mojabi (Persian: سید محمد مجابی, born 10 July 1965 in Qazvin) is an Iranian environmentalist and politician who serves as chair of the Special Committee on the Environment of the Expediency Council and managing director of Agricultural Services Specialized Holding Company, a state-owned industrial group affiliated to Iran's Ministry of Agriculture.

Between 2017 and 2019, he served as Deputy Minister of Agriculture for Parliamentary Affairs. Earlier, he served on two occasions – between 1998 and 2004, and 2013 and 2017 – as deputy head of Iran's Department of Environment.

He holds a bachelor's degree in economics from the Allameh Tabataba'i University, a master's degree in environmental economics and a doctorate in environmental management, both from Tehran SRBIAU.
