= Abolhasan Khan Ardalan =

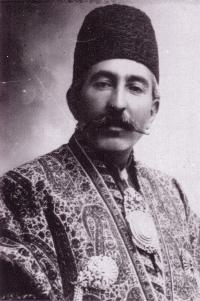
Photograph of Abolhasan Khan

Abolhasan Khan Ardalan (Persian: ابوالحسن‌ خان اردلان) also known as Hajj Fakhr ol-Molk (Persian: حاج فخرالملک; 1862/63 - 1926) was an Iranian government official during the late Qajar era.

In his youth Abolhasan Khan served in court as page. Later he became an attendant of Naser al-Din Shah and accompanied him in last journey to Europe in 1889. Abolhasan Khan held several military and administrative positions including the governorships of Hamadan between 1898 and 1899, and Arak for three times, later as ministry of commerce, between 1903 and 1904. He died in retirement on 1926.

== Sources ==
- Ardakani, Hosayn M. (1983). "Abu'l-Ḥasan Khan Ardalān". In Yarshater, Ehsan (ed.). Encyclopædia Iranica (Online ed.). Encyclopædia Iranica Foundation.
- Bamdad, Mehdi (1968). شرح حال رجال ایران در قرن ۱۲ و۱۳ و ۱۴ هجری [Biographies of the Dignitaries of Iran in the 12th, 13th, and 14th Centuries AH] (PDF) (in Persian). Vol. 1. Tehran: Zavvar.
