= Iran's Family Protection Law =

1967 Iranian legislation

In 1967, Iran adopted a set of progressive family laws, the Family Protection Act, which granted women family rights; these were expanded in the Family Protection Law of 1975. The act was annulled in 1979 after the Islamic Revolution when Sharia law was re-introduced, but it stands out for having been ahead of its time, particularly in a Muslim-majority country.

Today, parts of the acts have been reintroduced in Iran, while others are under consideration. For instance, the 1967 bill set up Special Courts for family matters. They were dissolved after the revolution, but Special Civil Courts were re-established in 1979 to adjudicate over matters relating to family law, succession and awqaf. Similarly, some legislative changes have moved family matters in a more progressive direction in the areas of minimum age of marriage, child custody and the grounds on which women can request divorce.

== History ==
=== Before 1975 ===
In 1906, the first constitution was promulgated in Iran. A series of laws were enacted in the following years, including in family law.

In the 1930s, there were twelve Shi'ite laws of marriage, divorce, legitimacy, and custody of children that were incorporated in the civil code (Qānūn-e madanī). These twelve laws were enacted and revised in the 1930s. Marriages and divorces had to be recorded in state registries following passage of the Marriage Act of 1931 (Article 1041).

In 1962, Iranian law regarded women as being in the same class as minors, criminals, and the insane: they could neither vote nor stand for public office, were not allowed the guardianship of their own children, could not work or marry without permission of their male "benefactors", could be divorced at any moment (with or without their prior knowledge, through the utterance of a simple sentence by the husband), and could be faced with the presence of a second, third, or fourth wife in their home at any moment-with no legal, financial, or emotional recourse. They could not become guardians of their children even after the father's death. They could not transfer their citizenship to their children; indeed their citizenship was in jeopardy if they married a non-Iranian. They inherited from a father's estate only half of what their brothers received and from a husband's estate only one-fourth when there were no children and one-eighth if there were children.

In 1967, two family protection bills were proposed. Majles representatives, including Mehrangiz Dowlatshahi, presented the bill which would later become law. Female Senator Mehrangiz Manouchehrian presented a more progressive bill which was signed by 15 senators. However, when some of the media presented an exaggerated take on the progressive bill, Manouchehrian had to leave Tehran until the publicity died down, and possible threats to her safety subsided. As a consequence, the family law articles on polygamy and child custody were not addressed until 1975. Nonetheless, the Family Protection Law abolished extrajudicial divorce, greatly limited polygyny, and established special Family Courts for dealing with matters relating to the new personal status legislation.

The conservative clergy were vehemently opposed to the Family Protection Act and its goals. The Act removed a whole set of juridical issues in family interaction from clerical jurisdiction and handed it to family courts to decide. The clergy therefore lost much power and authority.

The law curtailed men's unilateral prerogatives regarding divorce and polygamy. Husbands would have to apply to a court for a non-reconciliation certificate first, and then the court would negotiate between the two parties.

=== After 1979 ===
The Family Protection Act was abrogated immediately after the 1979 revolution. The marriage age reverted to 9 for girls. Restrictions on polygamy and temporary marriages were repealed. The mehrieh (marriage portion payable to the wife) was taxed above the level considered customary by the government.

In September 1979, a modified version of the Family Protection Law's divorce provisions were introduced and adopted on the 23rd of that month. It created special civil courts that went into effect in November of that year. It allowed divorce only after a judge attempted to reconcile a marriage between both parties, then the court would schedule to hear the case and make a decision. If both mutually consent to divorce, then they go to an Office of Marriage and Divorce Registration and register their divorce before two witnesses.

Also, the minimum age of marriage was moved from 9 to the onset of puberty. Child custody, no longer an inalienable right of fathers, is now up to the decision of Special Civil Courts. A 1992 law amended regulations on divorce, extending a wife's access to divorce and granting women more grounds for requesting a divorce.

== Key points ==
=== Marriage ===
The Family Protection Law of 1967 increased the minimum age of marriage to 15 for women and to 18 for men. The Family Protection Law of 1975 then raised the minimum age of marriage to 18 for women and to 20 for men.

=== Divorce ===
The right of divorce had initially belonged unconditionally to the husband and under certain circumstances for wife, but with the Family Protection Law, both men and women can ask the courts equally for divorce under specific circumstances.

There were seven circumstances in which either spouse could ask for divorce. One involves the refusal of the provision of tamkin, the duty, in Islam, to submit to a spouse's will. Traditionally, this has been applied to women, but Islam states that it must be reciprocated by both parties.

The other circumstances include:

- Mistreatment on part of the husband or the wife;
- Lack of provision of "maintenance" to the wife as well the lack of ability to satisfy other needs of the wife;
- An incurable disease (mental and physical) of either husband or wife;
- Any addiction that makes the continuation of marital life impossible;
- More than five years' imprisonment of either person;
- Infertility of either person.

=== Child custody and alimony ===
The courts determined whether it would be more beneficial for the child to live with the father or the mother.

The father was responsible for providing support unless he was deemed financially incapable of doing so in which case the mother would be held responsible. The father was responsible for managing the finances of the child. However, after the father's death, or in case of his inability to carry out his duties, the courts could appoint either the mother or the paternal grandfather as the child's guardian. In Islamic jurisprudence, the parents have the child custody until they live together. Nevertheless, there are different opinions about after their divorce. As stated by some jurists and also by the Iranian Civil Law, child custody (boy or girl) until the age seven is given to the mother and afterward to the father. Another group of jurists maintain that the custody of a girl until she is seven and the custody of a boy until he is two is given to the mother and then to the father.Needless to say, the parents have the child custody from the birth until the child becomes an adult, after which he/she is not a child to be taken care of.

=== Polygamy ===
Prior to the ratification of the 1975 Family Protection Law, a man could marry four wives and have temporary marriages. As a result of this the 1975 law, a man could marry a second wife only with permission of the courts (with a valid reason to obtain this permission) and after obtaining the express consent of his first wife.

== See also ==
- Iranian Women's Movement
- One Million Signatures campaign
