= Ata Mojabi =

Ata Mojabi in 2025

Ata Mojabi (Persian: عطا مجابی; born 1982 in Qazvin, Iran) is an Iranian screenwriter, film director and film producer. He is known for a number of short films that have been screened at international festivals and for his role in various selection and jury panels in Iranian and international short film festivals.

== Career ==
Mojabi began his career making experimental short films with intertextual references to film history and later produced black-and-white shorts blending noir elements with Iranian architecture. His films have been selected for festivals such as the Tehran Short Film Festival, In The Palace, L'Étrange Film Festival and the Seattle International Film Festival and won awards at prestigious film festivals such as Aix-en-Provence Tous Courts, and Tehran ISFF.

He wrote the web series Kashokhin (2019–2020), produced in partnership with the Filimo platform, which has also been shown on other streaming services such as tubi, filmin and indieflix.

Mojabi served for a while as the International Programs Director at the Iranian Youth Cinema Society and artistic director of the Tehran International Short Film Festival (the only Oscar Qualified festival in Iran). He has also been a member of selection and jury panels for several national and international film festivals.

== Selected filmography ==
The Man Who Wasn't Here (2017)— director, editor, writer. Nominated for the best short film at the Fajr Film Festival and Tehran Int Short Film Festival.

Kashokhin (2019, tv series)- writer. Iranian action thriller web television series produced in 2019. The series was directed by Keyvan Mohseni. It was released on the Iranian video-on-demand platform Filimo as an 11-episode first season.

In 2022, a six-episode international version of the series was produced and released on the streaming platforms Tubi, IndieFlix, and Filmin.

SineCide or No One Believes Me But The Police Are Chasing The Wrong Man (2019) — experimental short; nominated for the best experimental film at the Tehran Short Film Festival, and selected at the L'etrange Film Festival, Seattle Int Film Festival.

Psychicken (2023)— co-production Iran–Italy; winner of Best Adapted Screenplay at Tehran Int Short Film Festival, nominated for the best film at Fajr Film Festival and also selected at the IN THE PALACE, MAGMA.

Rekindle (2025) - short film co-produced by Iran, the Netherlands, and Russia. It won the first place award at the FILM7DAYS Filmmaking Camp in Kazan, and was selected for competition at several film festivals, including the 48th Grenzland Filmtage Selb30th Portobello Film Festival, and the 15th ISFA Academy Awards.

== Awards ==
His recent short Rekindle (2025), a co-production between the Netherlands, Russia and Iran) won the 1st prize at the Film7Days international event held in Kazan, Tatarestan and also won Audacity Award at the 43rd Tous Court film festival
