= Joint Operation Arvand =

Show of force operation conducted by Imperial Iranian Armed Forces

- Part of the Cold War
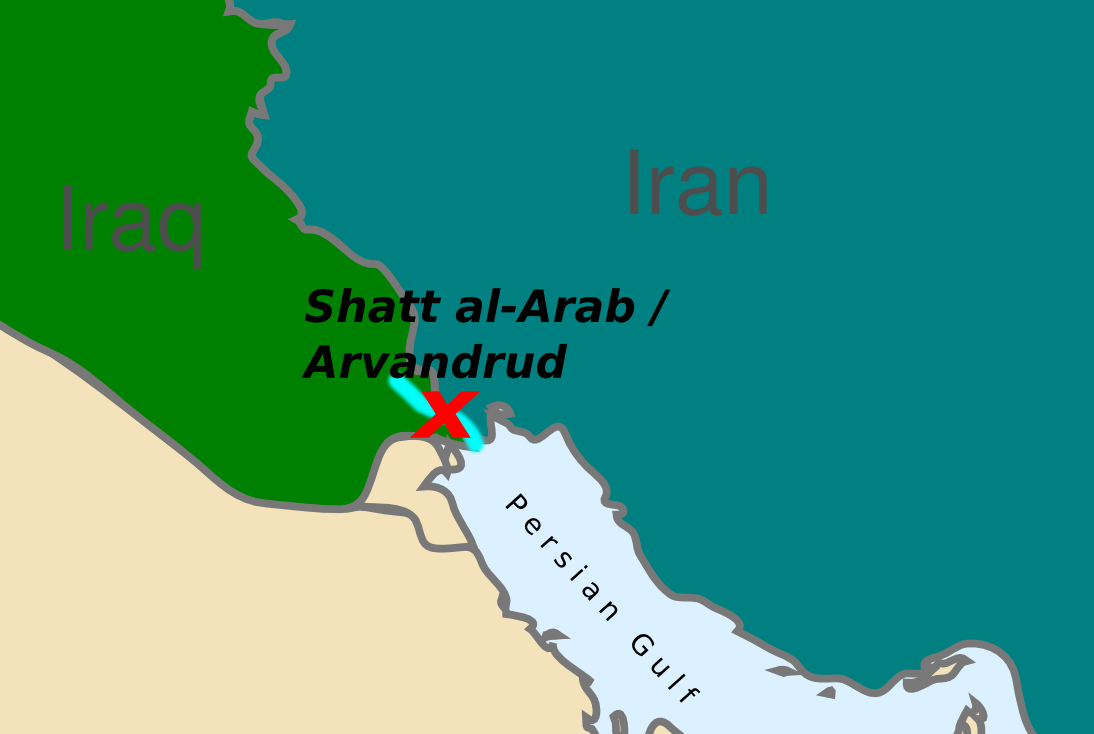
- Location: Shatt al-Arab river, Iran–Iraq border
- Objective: Escorting Iranian shipping
- Date: 22–25 April 1969
- Executed by: Iran: Imperial Iranian Navy: 2 ships; Imperial Iranian Air Force: a squadron of F4 Phantom; Imperial Iranian Army
- Outcome: Iranian tactical victory: Tensions continued between the two countries until 1975 Algiers Agreement
- Casualties: None

The Joint Operation Arvand (Persian: عملیات مشترک اروند, more known by its Persian acronym AMA, عما) was a show of force operation orchestrated in April 1969 by the Imperial Iranian Armed Forces following Iraqi claim for the sovereign right to Shatt al-Arab/Arvand Rud and threatening to block passage of vessels unless they fly the Iraqi flag.

Aware of Iraq's constrained position at the time—60,000 Iraqi troops were already deployed in Iraqi Kurdistan, and three Iraqi brigades were stationed in Jordan—on the orders of the Shah, the Iranian merchant ship Ebn-e-Sina (Avicenna), a 1,176-ton vessel carrying a cargo of steel beams and flying the Iranian flag, was escorted on April 22, 1969, by heavily armed Iranian naval vessels and jet fighters. The ship proceeded without lowering the Iranian flag through the river into the Persian Gulf, completing an 80-mile journey in approximately six hours. Despite its earlier pledges, the Iraqi forces did not attempt to intervene.

Both countries strengthened their land forces along the river bank, stationing artillery, tanks and anti-aircraft weapons. Iranian troops were positioned in the vicinity of Khorramshahr and Abadan, while Iraq put its forces in Basra on alert. Iranian freighter Arya Far passed through the river escorted by four gunboats three days later, with no disturbance. Although Iraq placed its army on high alert in nearby Basra, it was unable to threaten the Iranian vessel. Iran's deployment of heavy tanks, aircraft, and artillery deterred the Baath leadership from obstructing the waterway, delivering a significant setback to Baghdad. While Baghdad reported the issue to the UN Security Council, the Arvand Rud Crisis marked a significant triumph for Iran.

Iraq undertook retaliatory measures by mistreating and evicting Iranian residents within its borders; it expelled thousands of Iranian residents and pilgrims from its territory. Iraq also banned the import of Iranian goods, stating it was to "support the goals of the Arab nation." Additionally, it began supporting separatist movements in Khuzestan and Balochistan.
