= Sararud =

Sararud or Sara Rud or Sera Rud (Persian: سرارود), also rendered as Sararu, may refer to:

- Sara Rud, Gilan
- Sararud-e Olya, Kermanshah Province
- Sararud-e Sofla, Kermanshah Province
- Sararud, Markazi
