= Amirabad, Ashtian =

Village in Markazi province, Iran

Amirabad Persian: اميراباد
- Village
- Location within Iran
- Coordinates: 34°21′58″N 50°15′21″E
- Country: Iran
- Province: Markazi
- County: Ashtian
- District: Central
- Rural District: Mazraeh Now

Population (2016)
  - Total: 12
- Time zone: UTC+3:30 (IRST)

Amirabad (Persian: اميراباد) (Note: Also romanized as Amīrābād) is a village in Mazraeh Now Rural District of the Central District in Ashtian County, Markazi province, Iran.

== Demographics ==
=== Population ===
At the time of the 2006 National Census, the village's population was 24 in eight households. The following census in 2011 counted 18 people in seven households. The 2016 census measured the population of the village as 12 people in five households.
