= Naderabad, Markazi =

Village in Markazi province, Iran

Naderabad Persian: نادراباد
- Village
- Location within Iran
- Coordinates: 34°31′03″N 49°56′30″E
- Country: Iran
- Province: Markazi
- County: Ashtian
- District: Central
- Rural District: Garakan

Population (2016)
  - Total: 194
- Time zone: UTC+3:30 (IRST)

Naderabad (Persian: نادرآباد) (Note: Also romanized as Nāderābād; also known as Nādirābād and Qāderābād) is a village in Garakan Rural District of the Central District in Ashtian County, Markazi province, Iran.

== Demographics ==
=== Population ===
At the time of the 2006 National Census, the village's population was 508 in 135 households. The following census in 2011 counted 264 people in 120 households. The 2016 census measured the population of the village as 194 people in 85 households.
