= Seqer Juq =

Village in Markazi province, Iran

Seqer Juq Persian: سقرجوق
- Village
- Location within Iran
- Coordinates: 34°31′30″N 49°53′06″E
- Country: Iran
- Province: Markazi
- County: Ashtian
- District: Central
- Rural District: Garakan

Population (2016)
  - Total: 253
- Time zone: UTC+3:30 (IRST)

Seqer Juq (Persian: سقرجوق) (Note: Also romanized as Saqarjūq and Seqer Jūq; also known as Saghar Jokh and Saghar Joogh) is a village in Garakan Rural District of the Central District in Ashtian County, Markazi province, Iran.

== Demographics ==
=== Population ===
At the time of the 2006 National Census, the village's population was 260 in 92 households. The following census in 2011 counted 228 people in 101 households. The 2016 census measured the population of the village as 253 people in 104 households.
