= Varsan, Markazi =

Village in Markazi province, Iran

Varsan Persian: ورسان
- Village
- Location within Iran
- Coordinates: 34°30′06″N 50°08′17″E
- Country: Iran
- Province: Markazi
- County: Ashtian
- District: Central
- Rural District: Mazraeh Now

Population (2016)
  - Total: 112
- Time zone: UTC+3:30 (IRST)

Varsan (Persian: ورسان) (Note: Also romanized as Varsān) is a village in Mazraeh Now Rural District of the Central District in Ashtian County, Markazi province, Iran.

== Demographics ==
=== Population ===
At the time of the 2006 National Census, the village's population was 128 in 51 households. The following census in 2011 counted 62 people in 30 households. The 2016 census measured the population of the village as 112 people in 47 households.
