= Kushkak, Ashtian =

Village in Markazi province, Iran

Kushkak Persian: كوشكك
- Village
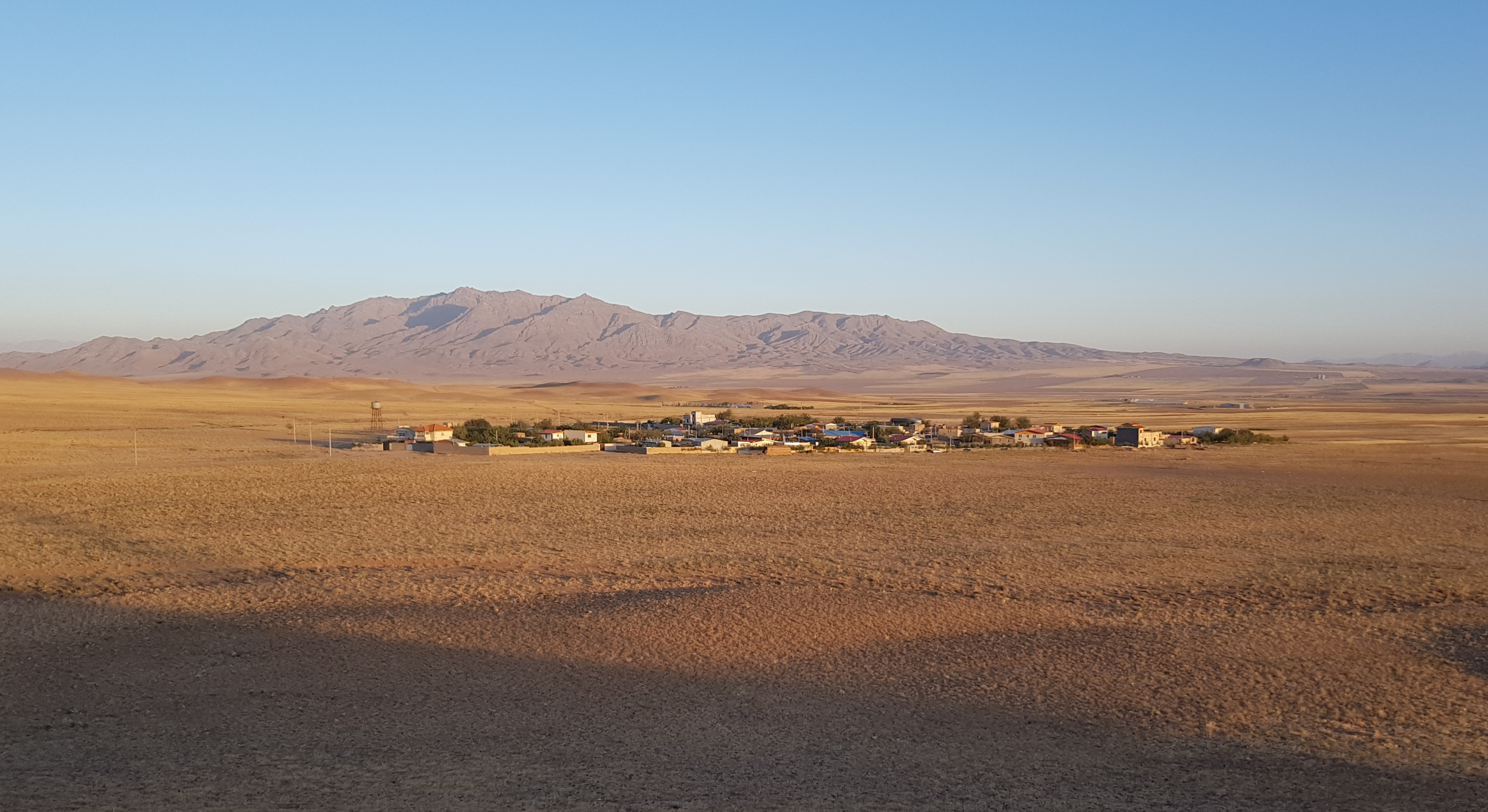
- The village of Kushkak

- Location within Iran
- Coordinates: 34°24′26″N 50°14′20″E
- Country: Iran
- Province: Markazi
- County: Ashtian
- District: Central
- Rural District: Mazraeh Now

Population (2016)
  - Total: 24
- Time zone: UTC+3:30 (IRST)

Kushkak (Persian: كوشكك) (Note: Also romanized as Kūshkak; also known as Gūshkalak and Kūsgak) is a village in Mazraeh Now Rural District of the Central District in Ashtian County, Markazi province, Iran.

== Demographics ==
=== Population ===
At the time of the 2006 National Census, the village's population was 43 in 18 households. The following census in 2011 counted 25 people in 11 households. The 2016 census measured the population of the village as 24 people in 11 households.
