= Saidabad, Markazi =

Village in Markazi province, Iran

Saidabad Persian: سعيداباد
- Village
- Location within Iran
- Country: Iran
- Province: Markazi
- County: Ashtian
- District: Central
- Rural District: Mazraeh Now

Population (2016)
  - Total: Below reporting threshold
- Time zone: UTC+3:30 (IRST)

Saidabad (Persian: سعيداباد) (Note: Also romanized as Saʿīdābād) is a village in Mazraeh Now Rural District of the Central District in Ashtian County, Markazi province, Iran.

== Demographics ==
=== Population ===
At the time of the 2006 National Census, the village's population was 20 in five households. The following censuses in 2011 and 2016 counted a population below the reporting threshold.
