= Zarnusheh =

Village in Markazi province, Iran

Zarnusheh Persian: زرنوشه
- Village
- Location within Iran
- Coordinates: 34°32′22″N 49°51′39″E
- Country: Iran
- Province: Markazi
- County: Ashtian
- District: Central
- Rural District: Garakan

Population (2016)
  - Total: 335
- Time zone: UTC+3:30 (IRST)

Zarnusheh (Persian: زرنوشه) (Note: Also romanized as Zarnūsheh; also known as Zanūsheh) is a village in Garakan Rural District of the Central District in Ashtian County, Markazi province, Iran.

== Demographics ==
=== Population ===
At the time of the 2006 National Census, the village's population was 687 in 163 households. The following census in 2011 counted 402 people in 124 households. The 2016 census measured the population of the village as 335 people in 113 households.
