= Khvorakabad =

Village in Markazi province, Iran

Khvorakabad Persian: خوراكاباد
- Village
- Location within Iran
- Coordinates: 34°26′31″N 50°04′54″E
- Country: Iran
- Province: Markazi
- County: Ashtian
- District: Central
- Rural District: Mazraeh Now

Population (2016)
  - Total: 52
- Time zone: UTC+3:30 (IRST)

Khvorakabad (Persian: خوراكاباد) (Note: Also romanized as Khowrākābād and Khvorākābād; also known as Kharkābād) is a village in Mazraeh Now Rural District of the Central District in Ashtian County, Markazi province, Iran.

== Demographics ==
=== Population ===
At the time of the 2006 National Census, the village's population was 72 in 23 households. The following census in 2011 counted 70 people in 22 households. The 2016 census measured the population of the village as 52 people in 20 households.
