= Ananjerd =

Village in Markazi province, Iran

Ananjerd Persian: انانجرد
- Village
- Location within Iran
- Coordinates: 34°22′27″N 50°17′39″E
- Country: Iran
- Province: Markazi
- County: Ashtian
- District: Central
- Rural District: Mazraeh Now

Population (2016)
  - Total: 171
- Time zone: UTC+3:30 (IRST)

Ananjerd (Persian: انانجرد) (Note: Also romanized as Anānjerd) is a village in Mazraeh Now Rural District of the Central District in Ashtian County, Markazi province, Iran.

== Demographics ==
=== Population ===
At the time of the 2006 National Census, the village's population was 177 in 63 households. The following census in 2011 counted 141 people in 55 households. The 2016 census measured the population of the village as 171 people in 75 households.
