= Sadabad, Markazi =

Village in Markazi province, Iran

Sadabad Persian: سعداباد
- Village
- Location within Iran
- Coordinates: 34°31′43″N 49°53′03″E
- Country: Iran
- Province: Markazi
- County: Ashtian
- District: Central
- Rural District: Garakan

Population (2016)
  - Total: 62
- Time zone: UTC+3:30 (IRST)

Sadabad (Persian: سعداباد) (Note: Also romanized as Sa‘dābād) is a village in Garakan Rural District of the Central District in Ashtian County, Markazi province, Iran.

== Demographics ==
=== Population ===
At the time of the 2006 National Census, the village's population was 65 in 15 households. The following census in 2011 counted 46 people in 13 households. The 2016 census measured the population of the village as 62 people in 23 households.
