= Dastjerdeh, Ashtian =

Village in Markazi province, Iran

Dastjerdeh Persian: دستجرده
- Village
- Location within Iran
- Coordinates: 34°23′41″N 49°57′02″E
- Country: Iran
- Province: Markazi
- County: Ashtian
- District: Central
- Rural District: Siyavashan

Population (2016)
  - Total: 177
- Time zone: UTC+3:30 (IRST)

Dastjerdeh (Persian: دستجرده) (Note: Also known as Dastjerd and Deskirdeh) is a village in Siyavashan Rural District of the Central District in Ashtian County, Markazi province, Iran.

== Demographics ==
=== Population ===
At the time of the 2006 National Census, the village's population was 271 in 100 households. The following census in 2011 counted 197 people in 86 households. The 2016 census measured the population of the village as 177 people in 72 households.
