= Feyzabad, Ashtian =

Village in Markazi province, Iran

Feyzabad Persian: فيض اباد
- Village
- Location within Iran
- Coordinates: 34°28′06″N 49°55′24″E
- Country: Iran
- Province: Markazi
- County: Ashtian
- District: Central
- Rural District: Siyavashan

Population (2016)
  - Total: 249
- Time zone: UTC+3:30 (IRST)

Feyzabad (Persian: فيض اباد) (Note: Also romanized as Feyzābād and Feyẕābād; also known as Faizābād) is a village in Siyavashan Rural District of the Central District in Ashtian County, Markazi province, Iran.

== Demographics ==
=== Population ===
At the time of the 2006 National Census, the village's population was 697 in 155 households. The following census in 2011 counted 284 people in 126 households. The 2016 census measured the population of the village as 249 people in 108 households.
