= Baharestan, Ashtian =

Village in Markazi province, Iran

Baharestan Persian: بهارستان
- Village
- Location within Iran
- Coordinates: 34°26′38″N 50°11′13″E
- Country: Iran
- Province: Markazi
- County: Ashtian
- District: Central
- Rural District: Mazraeh Now

Population (2016)
  - Total: 175
- Time zone: UTC+3:30 (IRST)

Baharestan (Persian: بهارستان) (Note: Also romanized as Bahārestān; also known as Kharāb and Kharrāb) is a village in Mazraeh Now Rural District of the Central District in Ashtian County, Markazi province, Iran.

== Demographics ==
=== Population ===
At the time of the 2006 National Census, the village's population was 253 in 87 households. The following census in 2011 counted 201 people in 84 households. The 2016 census measured the population of the village as 175 people in 73 households.
