= Siyavashan =

Village in Markazi province, Iran

Siyavashan Persian: سياوشان
- Village
- Location within Iran
- Coordinates: 34°26′48″N 49°59′30″E
- Country: Iran
- Province: Markazi
- County: Ashtian
- District: Central
- Rural District: Siyavashan

Population (2016)
  - Total: 686
- Time zone: UTC+3:30 (IRST)

Siyavashan (Persian: سياوشان) (Note: Also romanized as Seyāvashān, Sīāvashān, Sīāvoshān, and Sīyāvashān; also known as Sheoshān and Sīāh Vashān) is a village in, and the capital of, Siyavashan Rural District in the Central District of Ashtian County, Markazi province, Iran.

== Demographics ==
=== Population ===
At the time of the 2006 National Census, the village's population was 826 in 285 households. The following census in 2011 counted 753 people in 280 households. The 2016 census measured the population of the village as 686 people in 261 households, the most populous in its rural district.
