= Mazraeh Now =

Mazraeh Now or Mazraeh-ye Now or Mazraeh Nau or Mazaraeh Nau (Persian: مزرعه نو) may refer to:

- Mazraeh-ye Now, Fars
- Mazraeh Now, Sistan, Kuhpayeh County, Isfahan province
- Mazraeh Now, Ashtian, Markazi province
- Mazraeh-ye Now, Khomeyn, Markazi province
- Mazraeh-ye Now, Mehriz, Yazd province
- Mazraeh Now Rural District, in Markazi province
