= Garakan =

Village in Markazi province, Iran

Garakan Persian: گركان
- Village
- Location within Iran
- Coordinates: 34°33′05″N 49°57′42″E
- Country: Iran
- Province: Markazi
- County: Ashtian
- District: Central
- Rural District: Garakan

Population (2016)
  - Total: 660
- Time zone: UTC+3:30 (IRST)

Garakan (Persian: گركان) (Note: Also romanized as Garakān and Gerakān) is a village in, and the capital of, Garakan Rural District in the Central District of Ashtian County, Markazi province, Iran.

== Demographics ==
=== Population ===
At the time of the 2006 National Census, the village's population was 799 in 245 households. The following census in 2011 counted 692 people in 232 households. The 2016 census measured the population of the village as 660 people in 221 households, the most populous in its rural district.
