= Abolhassan E'tesami =

Iranian artist (1903–1978)

- ابوالحسن اعتصامی
- Born: Abolhassan Eʿteṣām-al-Molk; 1903; Sublime State of Iran
- Died: 1978 (aged 74–75); Imperial State of Iran
- Other name: Abolhassan E'tesami
- Father: Mīrzā Ebrāhīm Khan Mostawfī Eʿteṣām-al-Molk
- Relatives: Yussef E'tesami (brother); Parvin E'tesami (niece)

Abolhassan E'tesami (1903–1978), was an Iranian architect, calligrapher, painter, and novelist.

== Biography ==
E'tesami's father, Mīrzā Ebrāhīm Khan Mostawfī Eʿteṣām-al-Molk (or Ebrahim E'tesami), was from Ashtian and was the head of finance of the Iranian province of Azerbaijan. His brother, Yussef E'tesami, was the founder of the Bahar journal, and the father of the poet Parvin E'tesami.

Abolhassan E'tesami was educated in Tehran at the Aghdasieh School, the American School, and the Kamal-ol-molk School of Fine Arts. Then, he spent some years in Isfahan to learn architecture and decoration techniques, and later went to work at the University of Tehran.

E'tesami produced a series of architecture projects, detailed maquettes of which were made by himself. On the Iranian Ministry of Fine Arts' request, the maquettes were sent to Brussels' 1958 Universal Exhibition, where Abolhassan E'tesami was awarded the gold medal in the individual presentation category. The maquettes were later bought by the National Museum of Iran and included in the permanent collection of the Islamic arts division.

In addition to architecture projects, E'tesami left a series of oil on canvas paintings including Some ruins in Dowlat-Abad, A village home in Niavaran, and Pasteur's intercession for Napoleon, and some novels including The left alone man and The malicious Mohil-o-doleh.

== Gallery ==
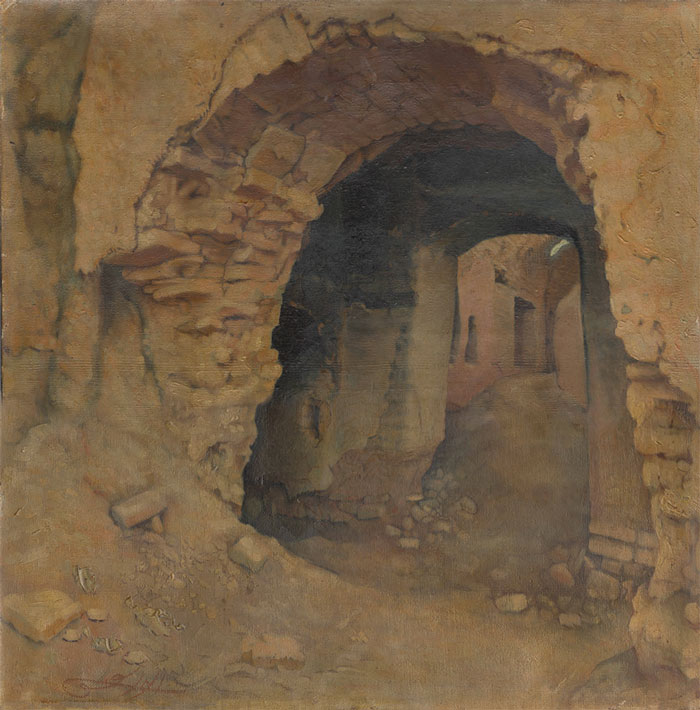
Some ruins in Dowlat-Abad, circa 1925

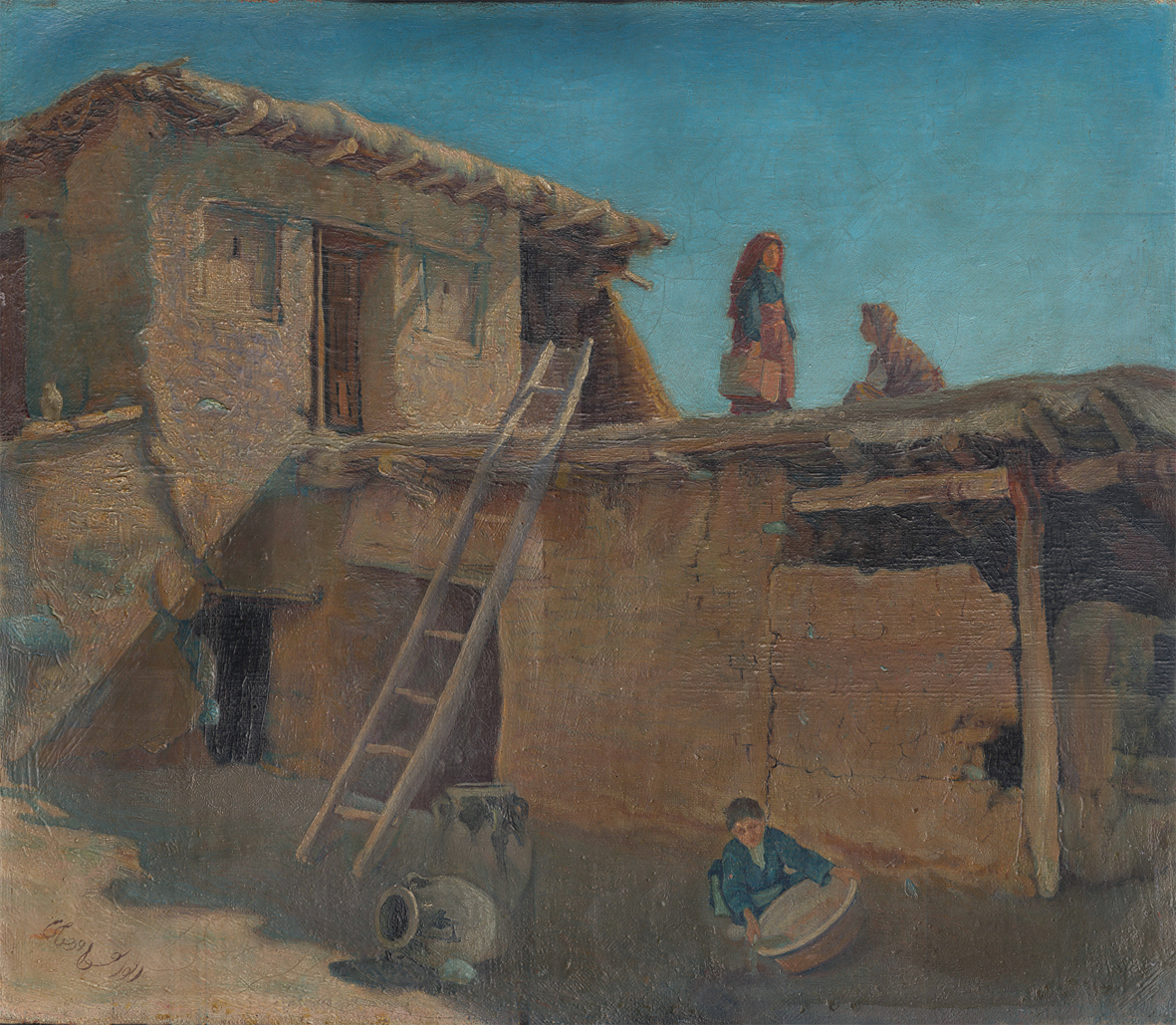
A village home in Niavaran, circa 1930
