= Cheshmeh-ye Allahverdi =

Village in Markazi province, Iran

Cheshmeh-ye Allahverdi Persian: چشمه اله وردي
- Village
- Location within Iran
- Country: Iran
- Province: Markazi
- County: Ashtian
- District: Central
- Rural District: Siyavashan

Population (2016)
  - Total: 69
- Time zone: UTC+3:30 (IRST)

Cheshmeh-ye Allahverdi (Persian: چشمه اله وردي) (Note: Also romanized as Cheshmeh-ye Allāhverdī; formerly known as Cheshmeh Khānverdī; also known as Cheshmeh) is a village in Siyavashan Rural District of the Central District in Ashtian County, Markazi province, Iran.

== Demographics ==
=== Population ===
At the time of the 2006 National Census, the village's population was 64 in 22 households. The following census in 2011 counted 48 people in 20 households. The 2016 census measured the population of the village as 69 people in 26 households.
