= Khvorcheh =

Village in Markazi province, Iran

Khvorcheh Persian: خورچه
- Village
- Location within Iran
- Coordinates: 34°30′41″N 49°51′38″E
- Country: Iran
- Province: Markazi
- County: Ashtian
- District: Central
- Rural District: Garakan

Population (2016)
  - Total: 193
- Time zone: UTC+3:30 (IRST)

Khvorcheh (Persian: خورچه) (Note: Also romanized as Khūrcheh) is a village in Garakan Rural District of the Central District in Ashtian County, Markazi province, Iran.

== Demographics ==
=== Population ===
At the time of the 2006 National Census, the village's population was 213 in 62 households. The following census in 2011 counted 191 people in 58 households. The 2016 census measured the population of the village as 193 people in 61 households.
