= Nowdeh, Ashtian =

Village in Markazi province, Iran

Nowdeh Persian: نوده
- Village
- Location within Iran
- Coordinates: 34°27′45″N 49°49′02″E
- Country: Iran
- Province: Markazi
- County: Ashtian
- District: Central
- Rural District: Siyavashan

Population (2016)
  - Total: 244
- Time zone: UTC+3:30 (IRST)

Nowdeh (Persian: نوده) (Note: Also romanized as Nūdeh; also known as Now Deh-e Najafābād) is a village in Siyavashan Rural District of the Central District in Ashtian County, Markazi province, Iran.

== Demographics ==
=== Population ===
At the time of the 2006 National Census, the village's population was 258 in 88 households. The following census in 2011 counted 251 people in 88 households. The 2016 census measured the population of the village as 244 people in 91 households.
