= Jafarabad, Ashtian =

Village in Markazi province, Iran

Jafarabad Persian: جعفراباد
- Village
- Location within Iran
- Coordinates: 34°23′07″N 49°54′14″E
- Country: Iran
- Province: Markazi
- County: Ashtian
- District: Central
- Rural District: Siyavashan

Population (2016)
  - Total: 117
- Time zone: UTC+3:30 (IRST)

Jafarabad (Persian: جعفراباد) (Note: Also romanized as Ja‘farābād) is a village in Siyavashan Rural District of the Central District in Ashtian County, Markazi province, Iran.

== Demographics ==
=== Population ===
At the time of the 2006 National Census, the village's population was 160 in 58 households. The following census in 2011 counted 139 people in 52 households. The 2016 census measured the population of the village as 117 people in 49 households.
