= Musaabad, Ashtian =

Village in Markazi province, Iran

Musaabad Persian: موسی‌آباد
- Village
- Location within Iran
- Coordinates: 34°32′43″N 49°55′29″E
- Country: Iran
- Province: Markazi
- County: Ashtian
- District: Central
- Rural District: Garakan

Population (2016)
  - Total: 90
- Time zone: UTC+3:30 (IRST)

Musaabad (Persian: موسی‌آباد) (Note: Also romanized as Musâ-Âbâd, Mūsáābād, Mūsīābād, and Mussiābād) is a village in Garakan Rural District of the Central District in Ashtian County, Markazi province, Iran.

== Demographics ==
=== Population ===
At the time of the 2006 National Census, the village's population was 336 in 82 households. The following census in 2011 counted 124 people in 49 households. The 2016 census measured the population of the village as 90 people in 38 households.
