= Mohsenabad, Ashtian =

Village in Markazi province, Iran

Mohsenabad Persian: محسن اباد
- Village
- Location within Iran
- Coordinates: 34°30′38″N 49°50′42″E
- Country: Iran
- Province: Markazi
- County: Ashtian
- District: Central
- Rural District: Garakan

Population (2016)
  - Total: 325
- Time zone: UTC+3:30 (IRST)

Mohsenabad (Persian: محسن اباد) (Note: Also romanized as Moḩsenābād; also known as Muhsinābād) is a village in Garakan Rural District of the Central District in Ashtian County, Markazi province, Iran.

== Demographics ==
=== Population ===
At the time of the 2006 National Census, the village's population was 545 in 121 households. The following census in 2011 counted 311 people in 107 households. The 2016 census measured the population of the village as 325 people in 117 households.
