= Bon Chenar =

Village in Markazi province, Iran

Bon Chenar Persian: بن چنار
- Village
- Location within Iran
- Coordinates: 34°34′05″N 49°55′46″E
- Country: Iran
- Province: Markazi
- County: Ashtian
- District: Central
- Rural District: Garakan

Population (2016)
  - Total: 186
- Time zone: UTC+3:30 (IRST)

Bon Chenar (Persian: بن چنار) (Note: Also romanized as Bon Chenār) is a village in Garakan Rural District of the Central District in Ashtian County, Markazi province, Iran.

== Demographics ==
=== Population ===
At the time of the 2006 National Census, the village's population was 413 in 98 households. The following census in 2011 counted 227 people in 84 households. The 2016 census measured the population of the village as 186 people in 71 households.
