= Salehabad, Ashtian =

Village in Markazi province, Iran

Salehabad Persian: صالح اباد
- Village
- Location within Iran
- Coordinates: 34°22′41″N 50°12′18″E
- Country: Iran
- Province: Markazi
- County: Ashtian
- District: Central
- Rural District: Mazraeh Now

Population (2016)
  - Total: 165
- Time zone: UTC+3:30 (IRST)

Salehabad (Persian: صالح اباد) (Note: Also romanized as Şāleḩābād and Sālhābād) is a village in Mazraeh Now Rural District of the Central District in Ashtian County, Markazi province, Iran.

== Demographics ==
=== Population ===
At the time of the 2006 National Census, the village's population was 359 in 104 households. The following census in 2011 counted 283 people in 93 households. The 2016 census measured the population of the village as 165 people in 69 households.
