= Shureh-ye Pain, Ashtian =

Village in Markazi province, Iran

Shureh-ye Pain Persian: شوره پايين
- Village
- Location within Iran
- Coordinates: 34°29′32″N 49°55′25″E
- Country: Iran
- Province: Markazi
- County: Ashtian
- District: Central
- Rural District: Garakan

Population (2016)
  - Total: Below reporting threshold
- Time zone: UTC+3:30 (IRST)

Shureh-ye Pain (Persian: شوره پايين) (Note: Also romanized as Shūreh-ye Pā’īn; also known as Shūrjeh Pā’īn and Shūrjeh-ye Soflá) is a village in Garakan Rural District of the Central District in Ashtian County, Markazi province, Iran.

== Demographics ==
=== Population ===
At the time of the 2006 National Census, the village's population was 13 in five households. The following censuses in 2011 and 2016 counted a population below the reporting threshold.
