= Ahu, Markazi =

Village in Markazi province, Iran

Ahu Persian: اهو
- Village
- Location within Iran
- Coordinates: 34°33′38″N 50°02′00″E
- Country: Iran
- Province: Markazi
- County: Ashtian
- District: Central
- Rural District: Garakan

Population (2016)
  - Total: 259
- Time zone: UTC+3:30 (IRST)

Ahu (Persian: اهو) (Note: Also romanized as Āhū) is a village in Garakan Rural District of the Central District in Ashtian County, Markazi province, Iran.

== Demographics ==
=== Population ===
At the time of the 2006 National Census, the village's population was 374 in 113 households. The following census in 2011 counted 223 people in 90 households. The 2016 census measured the population of the village as 259 people in 108 households.
