= Najafabad, Ashtian =

Village in Markazi province, Iran

Najafabad Persian: نجفاباد
- Village
- Location within Iran
- Coordinates: 34°27′01″N 49°48′04″E
- Country: Iran
- Province: Markazi
- County: Ashtian
- District: Central
- Rural District: Siyavashan

Population (2016)
  - Total: 197
- Time zone: UTC+3:30 (IRST)

Najafabad (Persian: نجفاباد) (Note: Also romanized as Najafābād; also known as Najīfābād) is a village in Siyavashan Rural District of the Central District in Ashtian County, Markazi province, Iran.

== Demographics ==
=== Population ===
At the time of the 2006 National Census, the village's population was 213 in 76 households. The following census in 2011 counted 198 people in 74 households. The 2016 census measured the population of the village as 197 people in 76 households.
