= Tajabad, Markazi =

Village in Markazi province, Iran

Tajabad Persian: تاج‌آباد
- Village
- Location within Iran
- Coordinates: 34°25′24″N 49°49′23″E
- Country: Iran
- Province: Markazi
- County: Ashtian
- District: Central
- Rural District: Siyavashan

Population (2016)
  - Total: 110
- Time zone: UTC+3:30 (IRST)

Tajabad (Persian: تاج‌آباد) (Note: Formerly Nurabad (نوراباد), also romanized as Nūrābād) is a village in Siyavashan Rural District of the Central District in Ashtian County, Markazi province, Iran.

== Demographics ==
=== Population ===
At the time of the 2006 National Census, the village's population was 121 in 42 households. The following census in 2011 counted 105 people in 37 households. The 2016 census measured the population of the village as 110 people in 39 households.
