= A Twig of a Wish =

1924 poem by Iranian poet Parvin E'tesami

A Twig of a Wish (Persian: نهال آرزو) is a 1924 poem by the Iranian poet Parvin E'tesami.

== History ==
Parvin E'tesami (1907–1941) grew up in an intellectual environment and under the supervision of her father, Yussef E'tesami, who himself had a literary background.

Etesami's poem “A Twig of a Wish” was written for her high school graduation ceremony from the Iran Bethel School in the spring of 1924. It was daring to assemble an audience at the girls’ school's ceremony, and for E'tesami to speak out directly about the importance of women's education and women's rights just before the beginning of the Pahlavi era. In “A Twig of a Wish,” Parvin E'tesami complains about the lack of respect and opportunities for women. She asserts women's importance by pointing out that women are in charge of nurturing and educating all children (both male and female) and therefore should have greater respect and an equal chance for education as men.

Her poem was written at a time when it was not unusual for women to be forced into marriages at a young age and be barred from attending school. Women's lives were very restricted during that time in Iran, and poetry was the only art in which a woman could express her thoughts and feelings. In such an atmosphere, E'tesami and other early modern women writers in Iran provided a strong feminist claim for women's rights.
