= Sarahrud =

Village in Markazi province, Iran

Sarahrud Persian: سرهرود
- Village
- Location within Iran
- Coordinates: 34°28′32″N 50°06′48″E
- Country: Iran
- Province: Markazi
- County: Ashtian
- District: Central
- Rural District: Mazraeh Now

Population (2016)
  - Total: 163
- Time zone: UTC+3:30 (IRST)

Sarahrud (Persian: سرهرود) (Note: Also romanized as Sarahrūd; also known as Sārārūd) is a village in Mazraeh Now Rural District of the Central District in Ashtian County, Markazi province, Iran.

== Demographics ==
=== Population ===
At the time of the 2006 National Census, the village's population was 286 in 73 households. The following census in 2011 counted 174 people in 60 households. The 2016 census measured the population of the village as 163 people in 54 households.
