= Hezarabad =

Village in Markazi province, Iran

Hezarabad Persian: هزاراباد
- Village
- Location within Iran
- Coordinates: 34°29′54″N 50°04′12″E
- Country: Iran
- Province: Markazi
- County: Ashtian
- District: Central
- Rural District: Mazraeh Now

Population (2016)
  - Total: 98
- Time zone: UTC+3:30 (IRST)

Hezarabad (Persian: هزاراباد) (Note: Also romanized as Hazārābād and Hezārābād; also known as Hizārābād) is a village in Mazraeh Now Rural District of the Central District in Ashtian County, Markazi province, Iran.

== Demographics ==
=== Population ===
At the time of the 2006 National Census, the village's population was 129 in 41 households. The following census in 2011 counted 120 people in 43 households. The 2016 census measured the population of the village as 98 people in 40 households.
