= Kardijan =

Village in Markazi province, Iran

Kardijan Persian: كرديجان
- Village
- Location within Iran
- Coordinates: 34°27′24″N 50°04′31″E
- Country: Iran
- Province: Markazi
- County: Ashtian
- District: Central
- Rural District: Mazraeh Now

Population (2016)
  - Total: 1,635
- Time zone: UTC+3:30 (IRST)

Kardijan (Persian: كرديجان) (Note: Also romanized as Kardījān and Kordījān; also known as Gardījān, Kardīān, and Qardīān) is a village in Mazraeh Now Rural District of the Central District in Ashtian County, Markazi province, Iran.

== Demographics ==
=== Population ===
At the time of the 2006 National Census, the village's population was 1,667 in 409 households. The following census in 2011 counted 1,646 people in 463 households. The 2016 census measured the population of the village as 1,635 people in 509 households, the most populous in its rural district.
