= Do Gush, Markazi =

Village in Markazi province, Iran

Do Gush Persian: دوگوش
- Village
- Location within Iran
- Coordinates: 34°19′59″N 50°15′34″E
- Country: Iran
- Province: Markazi
- County: Ashtian
- District: Central
- Rural District: Mazraeh Now

Population (2016)
  - Total: 5
- Time zone: UTC+3:30 (IRST)

Do Gush (Persian: دوگوش) (Note: Also romanized as Do Gūsh) is a village in Mazraeh Now Rural District of the Central District in Ashtian County, Markazi province, Iran.

== Demographics ==
=== Population ===
At the time of the 2006 National Census, the village's population was eight in four households. The following census in 2011 counted nine people in four households. The 2016 census measured the population of the village as five people in four households.
