= Doğuş =

Doğuş (pronounced [doˈuʃ]) is a Turkish name and may refer to:

- Doğuş Balbay, Turkish basketball player
- Doğuş Holding, one of the top three largest private-sector conglomerates in Turkey
- Doğuş University, private university in İstanbul

== See also ==
- Do Gush (disambiguation), places in Iran
