= Nalder =

Nalder is a surname of English origin. People with the surname include:

- Bill Nalder (born 1952), former Australian rules footballer
- Cambell Nalder (1937–1987), Australian politician, son of Crawford Nalder
- Crawford Nalder (1910–1994), Australian politician
- Dean Nalder (born 1966), Australian politician, grandson of Crawford Nalder and son of Cambell Nalder
- Eric Nalder, American journalist
- Leonard Fielding Nalder (1888–1958), British colonial administrator
- Reggie Nalder (1907–1991), actor
- Ron Nalder (born 1939), Australian rules footballer
