= Do Gush =

Do Gush or Dogush (Persian: دوگوش) may refer to:

- Do Gush, Behbahan, Khuzestan Province
- Do Gush, Markazi
