= Mazraeh Now, Ashtian =

Village in Markazi province, Iran

Mazraeh Now Persian: مزرعه نو
- Village
- Location within Iran
- Coordinates: 34°24′14″N 50°08′49″E
- Country: Iran
- Province: Markazi
- County: Ashtian
- District: Central
- Rural District: Mazraeh Now

Population (2016)
  - Total: 524
- Time zone: UTC+3:30 (IRST)

Mazraeh Now (Persian: مزرعه نو) (Note: Also romanized as Mazra‘eh Now and Mazra‘eh-ye Now; also known as Marzāno) is a village in, and the capital of, Mazraeh Now Rural District in the Central District of Ashtian County, Markazi province, Iran.

== Demographics ==
=== Population ===
At the time of the 2006 National Census, the village's population was 679 in 225 households. The following census in 2011 counted 623 people in 225 households. The 2016 census measured the population of the village as 524 people in 204 households.
