= Parvin E'tesami =

Iranian 20th-century Persian poet

- پروین اعتصامی
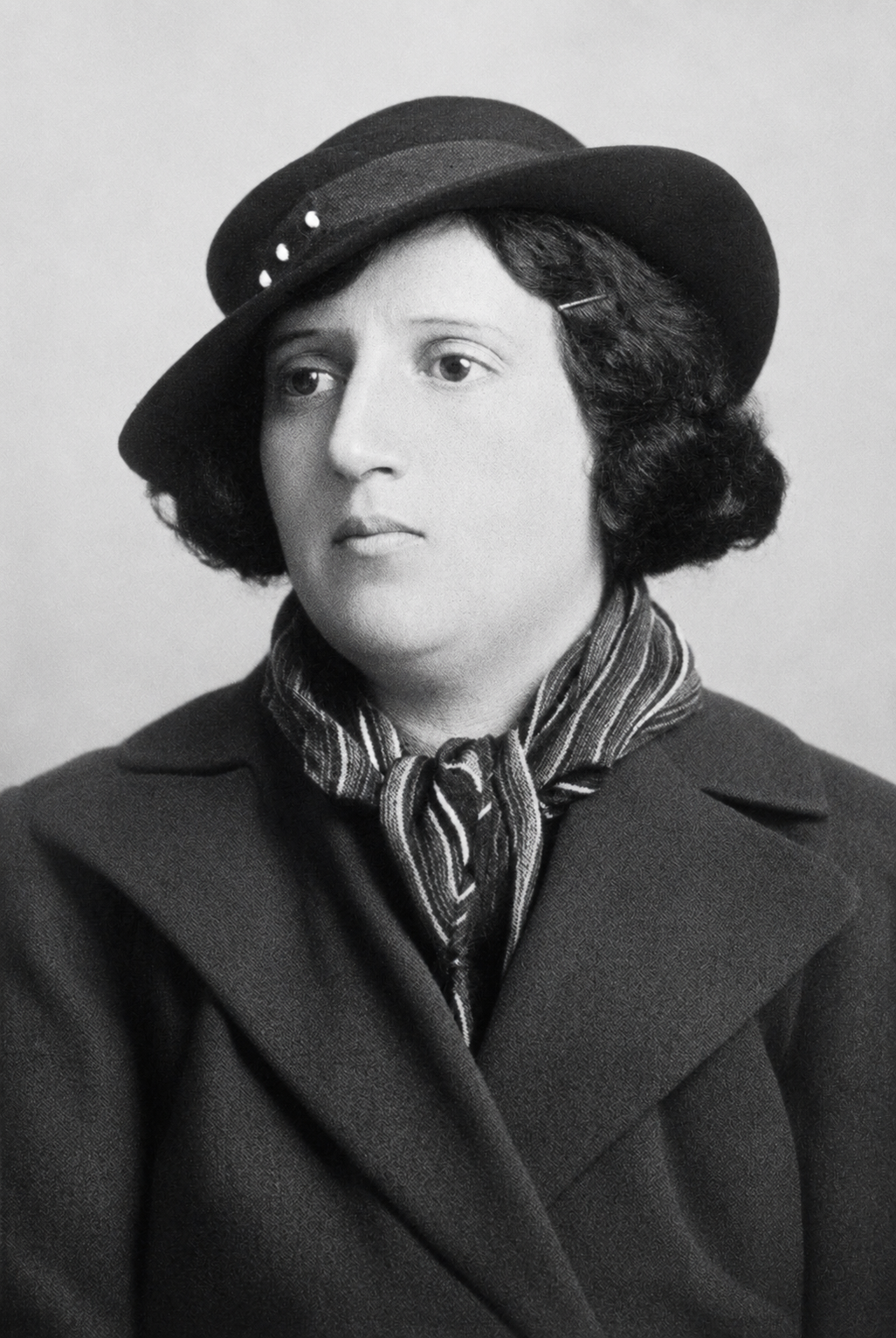
- Born: Rakhshandeh E'tesami; 17 March 1907; Tabriz, Sublime State of Iran
- Died: 4 April 1941 (aged 34); Qom, Imperial State of Iran
- Resting place: Fatima Masumeh Shrine
- Education: Iran Bethel School
- Occupation: Poet
- Spouse: Fazlollah E'tesami (1934–1935, separation)
- Father: Yussef E'tesami
- Relatives: Abolhassan E'tesami (uncle)

Rakhshandeh E'tesami (Note: Persian: رخشنده اعتصامی, IPA: [ɹæxʃænˈde ʔeʔtʰesɒːˈmiː]) (17 March 1907 – 4 April 1941), better known as Parvin E'tesami, (Note: پروین اعتصامی, IPA: [pʰæɹˈviːn ʔeʔtʰesɒːˈmiː]) was a 20th-century Iranian Persian-language poet.

== Biography ==
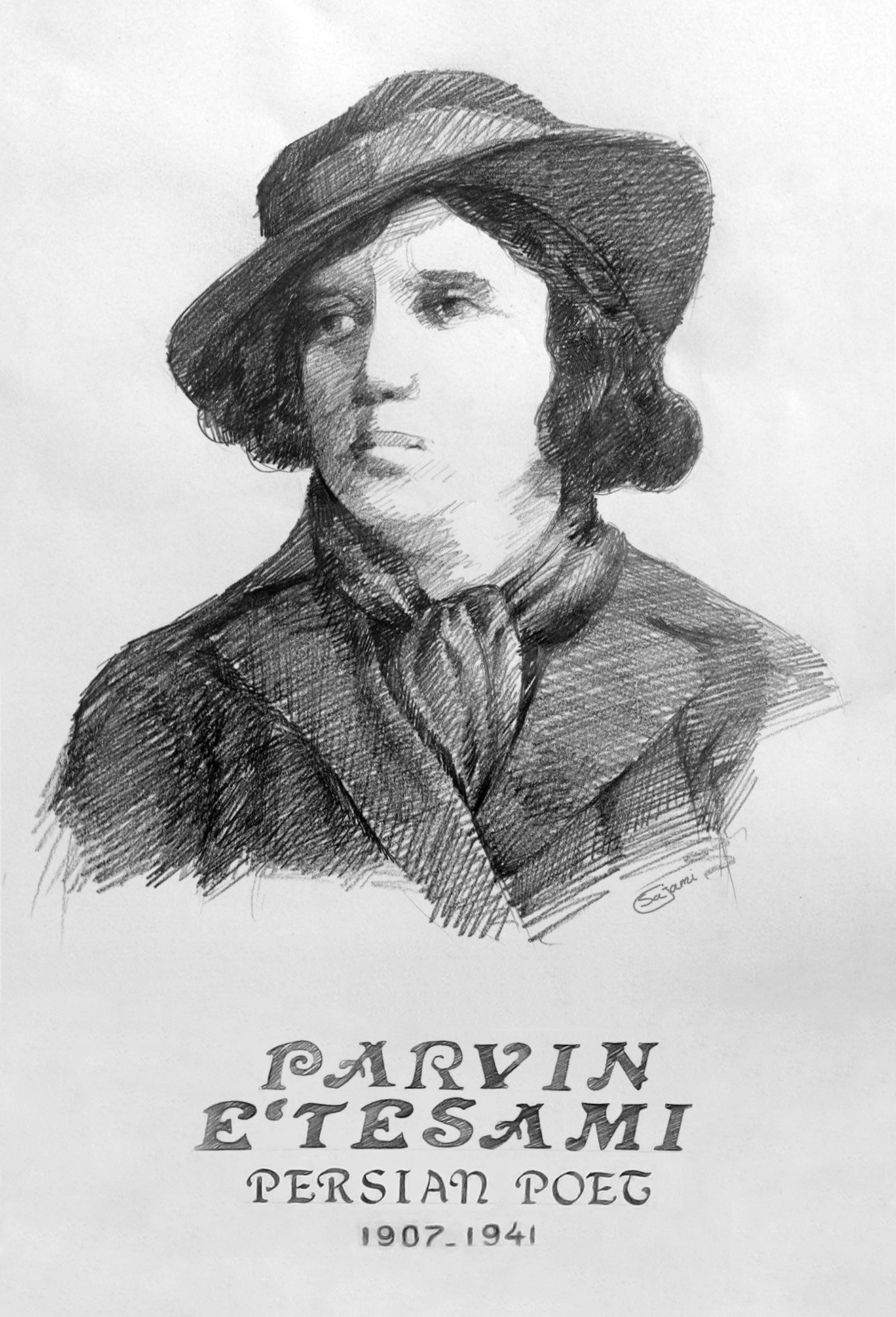
Sketch of Parvin E'tesami

Parvin E'tesami was born on 17 March 1907 in Tabriz to Mirza Yussef E'tesami Ashtiani (E'tesam-al-Molk). Her paternal grandfather was Mirza Ebrahim Khan Mostawfi Etesam-al-Molk. Her grandfather Mirza Ebrahim Khan Mostawfi Etesam-al-Molk was originally from Ashtiyan, but moved to Tabriz and was appointed financial controller of the province of Azerbaijan by the Qajar administration.

E'tesami had four brothers, her mother died in 1973. Her family moved to Tehran early in her life, and in addition to formal schooling, she obtained a solid understanding of Arabic and classical Persian literature from her father. At the age of 8 she started writing poems.

She studied at the Iran Bethel School in Tehran, an American high school for girls where she graduated in 1924. Afterwards, she taught for a while at that school. For her graduation she wrote the poem, A Twig of a Wish (1924) about the struggles facing Iranian women, their lack of opportunities, and the need for their education.

In 1926, she received an invitation to become the tutor of the Queen of the new Pahlavi court, but she refused.

On 10 July 1934, she was married to a cousin of her father, Fazlollah E'tesami, and they moved to the city of Kermanshah. The marriage lasted for only ten weeks and they separated due to differences of interests and personality and she returned to Tehran.

She was a member of the Kanoun-e-Banovan and supported the Kashf-e hijab reform against compulsory hijab (veiling).

In 1936, E'tesami was awarded by Reza Shah Pahlavi the third-degree Iran Medal of Art and Culture, but she declined.

Between 1938 and 1939, she worked for several months at the library of Danesh-Saraay-e 'Aali, (currently known as Tarbiat Moallem University) of Tehran.

Her father died in 1938, and she died three years later of typhoid fever. She was buried near her father in Qom, near the Fatima Masumeh Shrine.

Parvin E'tesami's house became an Iranian national heritage site on 19 October 2006.

=== Marriage ===
Parvin E'tesami married her father's cousin, Fazlollah E'tesami Ashtiani, on 10 July 1934, and four months after their engagement and marriage, they moved to Kermanshah. At the time of their marriage her husband was the head of the gendarmerie in Kermanshah. After living with her husband for nearly two months, Parvin returned to her father's house, and nine months later, on 5 August 1935, they separated. Abolfath E'tesami, Parvin's brother, cited the reason for the separation as mentality and ethical differences between the two, stating that her husband's military mindset was incompatible with Parvin's gentle and free-spirited nature.

Parvin never spoke about this unsuccessful marriage until the end of her life, and only composed a poem on the subject, the first three verses of which begin with these lines (translated from Persian):

Oh flower, in the company of the garden, what did you see?

Other than reproach and the bitterness of thorns, what did you see?

You went to the meadow but a cage became your fate,

Oh captive bird, besides the cage what did you see?

Oh radiant candle, with all this light,

Other than a petty buyer in the market, what did you see?

== Work ==
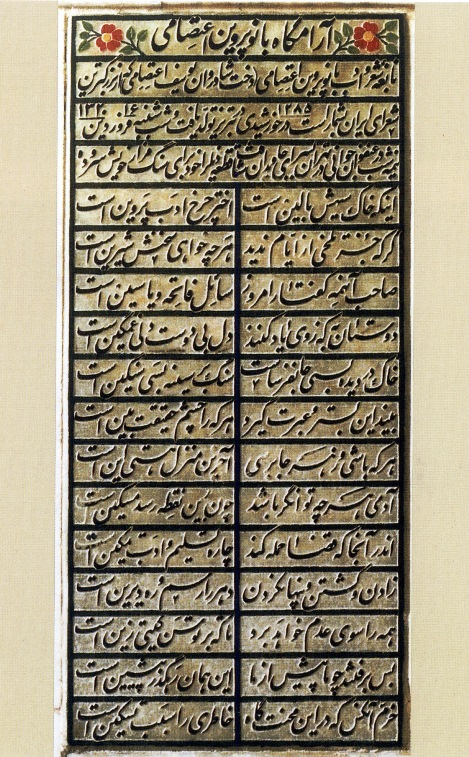
E'tesami's grave in Qom

E'tesami was around seven or eight years old when her poetic ability was revealed. Through her father's encouragement, she versified some literary pieces that were translated from Western sources, by him. From 1921 to 1922, some of her earliest known poems were published in the Persian magazine Bahar (Spring) when she was just a teenager. The first edition of her Divan (book of poetry) consisted of 156 poems and appeared in 1935. The poet and scholar Mohammad Taqi Bahar wrote an introduction to her work. The second edition of her book, edited by her brother Abu'l Fatha E'tesami, appeared shortly after she died in 1941. It consisted of 209 different compositions in Mathnawi, Qasida, Ghazal, and Qet'a (another form of Persian poetry), and stanzaic forms. It totaled 5606 distiches.

The poems "Gem and Stone", "Oh Bird", "Orphan's Tears", "Desired Child", "Our Lightning is the Oppression of Richness", "Effort and Action", and "Sorrow of Poverty" are among the most well-known poems she penned at a young age.

In her short life, she achieved great fame amongst Iranians. E'tesami's poetry follows the classical Persian tradition in its form and substance. She remained unaffected by or perhaps ignored the modernistic trends in Persian poetry. In the arrangement of her poetry book, there are approximately 42 untitled Qasidas and Qet'as. These works follow the didactic and philosophical styles of Sanai and Naser Khusraw. Several other Qasidas, particularly in the description of nature, show influences from the poet Manuchehri. There are also some Ghazals in her Divan.

According to Professor Heshmat Moayyad, her Safar-e ashk (Journey of a tear) counts among the finest lyrics ever written in Persian.

Another form of poetry, the monazara (debate), claims the largest portions of E'tesami's Divan. She composed approximately sixty-five poems in the style of monazara and seventy-five anecdotes, fables, and allegories. According to Moayyad: "Parvin wrote about men and women of different social backgrounds, a wide-ranging array of animals, birds, flowers, trees, cosmic and natural elements, objects of daily life, abstract concepts, all personified and symbolizing her wealth of ideas. Through these figures, she holds up a mirror to others showing them the abuses of society and their failure in moral commitment. Likewise, in these debates she eloquently expresses her basic thoughts about life and death, social justice, ethics, education, and the supreme importance of knowledge".

Throughout her life, E`tesami's work was a marriage of the traditional and modern; while her poetic style eschewed the new modernist styles and adhered closely to the forms and structures of classical Persian poetry.

== Parvin Etisami Literary Award ==
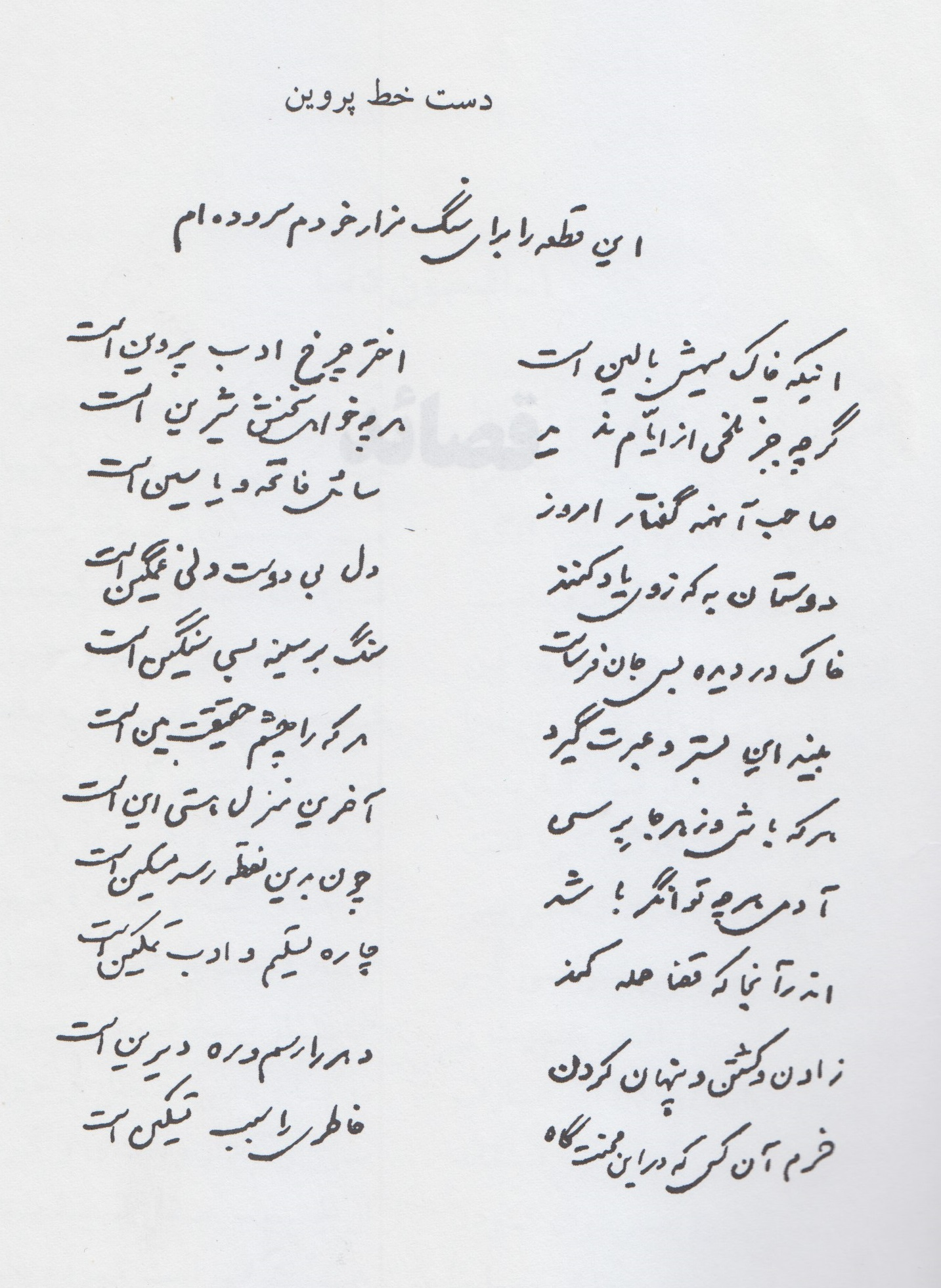
Parvin E'tesami's handwriting, the poem she composed for her tombstone

Parvin Etisami Literary Award was started in 2003 by the cultural assistant of the Ministry of Culture and Islamic Guidance, in the Office of Cultural Assemblies and Activities. It is held in different categories of poetry, fiction, dramatic literature, research literature, children's and adolescent poetry, and children's and adults' stories.

== Death ==
On 4 April 1941, Parvin Etesami died. On 19 October 2006, her home was designated as a national historic site in Iran.

Parvin E'tesami contracted typhoid in March 1941. Her brother, Abolfath E'tesami, was preparing her collected works for a second printing. However, Parvin’s deteriorating condition led to her being bedridden at home on 24 March 1941. It is said that negligence by her doctor in treating her illness led to her death. As her condition worsened significantly on the night of 3 April 1941, her family sent a carriage to fetch the doctor, but he did not come. Ultimately, Parvin E'tesami died on 4 April 1941 at the age of 34 in Tehran and was buried in the family mausoleum at Fatima Masumeh Shrine in Qom. She died in her mother's arms. After her death, a poem was found that she wrote for her own tombstone. The poem was inscribed on her tombstone. Some couplets of the poem are translated from Persian below:

This dark earth is now her pillow,
the star of the literary sky, Parvin [The Pleiades].

Though she saw nothing but bitterness from life,
Her words are sweet, as sweet as you desire.

The one who owned all those words,
Is now asking for a Fatiha and a Yasin [prayers for the dead].

The dust in the eyes is deeply tormenting,
The stone on the chest feels so heavy.

Whoever you are, wherever you come from,
This is the final destination of existence.

A person, no matter how wealthy,
When they reach this point, are but beggars.

Blessed is the one who, in this world of torment,
Becomes the cause of someone else's solace.

== See also ==
- Forough Farrokhzad
- Simin Behbahani
- Mina Assadi
- List of Iranian women writers and poets
