= Yussef E'tesami =

Iranian journalist, politician, publisher, translator and writer

- یوسف اعتصامی
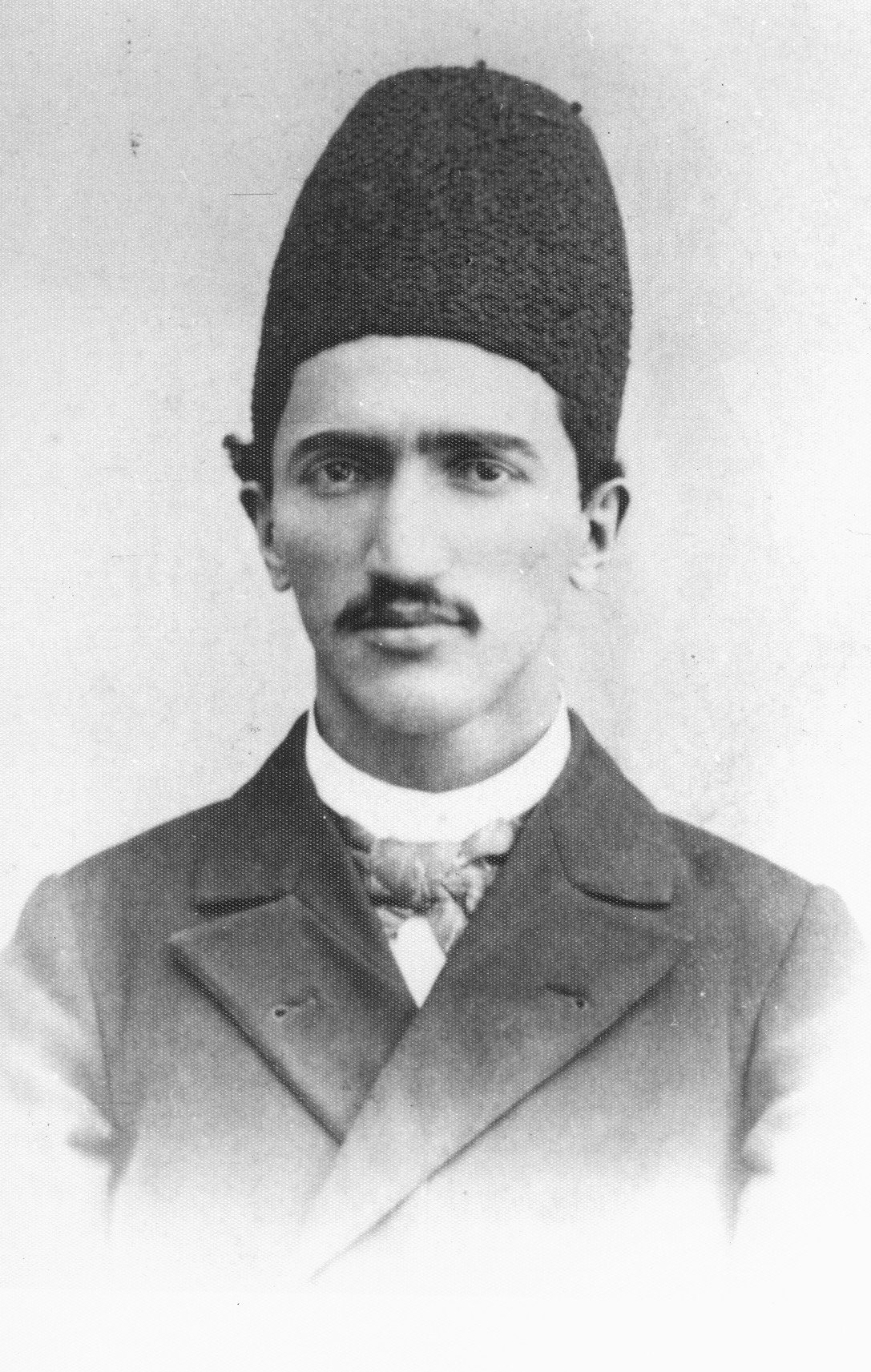
- Portrait of E'tesami, 19th century
- Born: Mirza Yusuf E'tesam-al-Molk; 1874; Tabriz, Sublime State of Iran
- Died: 2 January 1938 (aged 63–64); Tehran, Imperial State of Iran
- Resting place: Fatima Masumeh Shrine
- Other names: Mirza Yussef E'tesami E'tesam-al-Molk, Mirza Yusuf E'tesami Ashtiani, Yusuf E'tesami, Mirza Yusof Khan Ashtiani
- Known for: Bahar monthly journal, politician, publisher
- Children: Parvin E'tesami
- Father: Mīrzā Ebrāhīm Khan Mostawfī Eʿteṣām-al-Molk
- Relatives: Abolhassan E'tesami (brother)

Yussef E'tesami (Persian: یوسف اعتصامی; also known as E'tesam-al-Molk (اعتصام‌الملک), Mirza Yusuf E'tesami Ashtiani (میرزا یوسف اعتصامی آشتیانی); 1874–1938), was an Iranian journalist, politician, publisher, translator, and writer. He was a member of the second Majles (from 1909 to 1912). His daughter was poet Parvin E'tesami.

== Biography ==
Yussef E'tesami was born in 1874. His father, Mīrzā Ebrāhīm Khan Mostawfī Eʿteṣām-al-Molk was from Ashtian and the head of finance of the Iranian province of Azerbaijan. He was the elder brother of the architect and painter Abolhassan E'tesami, and the father of the poet Parvin E'tesami.

In the 1890s, Yussef E'tesami established the first typographical printing house in Tabriz. He was a member of the Iranian Parliament or Majles in 1909–12, and founded the Bahar journal in 1910. At various junctures, he served in the Ministry of Education and headed the Royal and Majles Libraries.

The Bahar journal was a sixty-four-page monthly published in two periods; from April 1910– October 1911 and from April 1921–December 1922. As noted in the first issue, the purpose of Bahar was “to provide a … forum for various significant topics of scientific, literary, ethical, historical, and artistic interest to people of understanding, and to acquaint the public with valuable information.” Most of the journal's material was written or translated by Yussef E'tesami, and a large part devoted to Western culture. To Edward Granville Browne (1928, 489) Bahar appeared "very modern and European in tone;" and in Encyclopaedia Iranica, Heshmat Moayyad points out its "liberal and humanistic" orientation.

In addition to his contributions to Bahar, Yussef E'tesami's produced about forty volumes of translations, in particular some Persian translations of Qasim Amin's Tahrir al-Mara, Victor Hugo's Les Misérables, vol. 1, and Friedrich Schiller's Kabale und Liebe. He is the author also of a commentary in Arabic of Abolqassem al-Zamakhshari's Atwaq ad-Dahab, a three-volume catalog of manuscripts in the Majles Library.

He died on 2 January 1938 in Tehran.

== Sources ==
- Browne, Edward G. 1928. A literary history of Persia, vol. 4. Cambridge: Cambridge University Press.
- Dehkhoda, Ali-Akbar. 1977. Biographical note. In Poems of Parvin Etessami, ed. Abolfath Etessami, p. 342. Tehran: Abolfath Etessami.
- E'tesami, Abolhassan. 1958. Biographical note. Tehran University News Bulletin 374, pp. 34–7.
