= Abbas Khalili =

Iraqi-born Iranian newspaper publisher, novelist, and diplomat

- عباس الخليلي
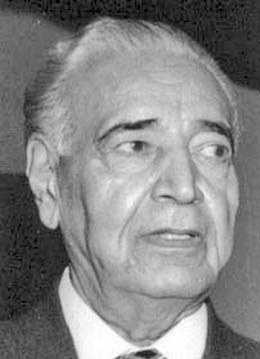
- Khalili in the 1960s
- Born: Abbas ibn Asadullah bin Ali al-Khalili al-Najaf c. 1895; Najaf, Ottoman Empire (present-day Najaf, Iraq)
- Died: 10 February 1972 (aged 76–77); Tehran, Imperial State of Iran
- Burial place: Behesht-e Zahra
- Other names: Abbas al-Khalili, Abbas Khalīlī, Abbās Khalili, Ali Fatiy-al-Eslām, Ḵalili-e Arab
- Occupations: diplomat, newspaper publisher, poet, novelist
- Political party: National Front (Iran)
- Spouses: Fakhr-Ozma Arghun, Māhmoneer Moeini-Azad
- Children: 6, including Simin Behbahani Mahyār Khalili
- Military career
- Allegiance: Jam'iya al-Nahda al-Islamiya
- Conflicts: World War I; Siege of Najaf (1918)

Abbas ibn Asadullah bin Ali al-Khalili al-Najafi, also known as Abbas al-Khalili, and Abbas Khalili (Persian: عباس الخلیلی، عباس خلیلی; 1895 or 1896 – 10 February 1972) was an Iraqi-born Iranian diplomat, newspaper publisher, poet and novelist. He was a pillar of the Najaf revolt over the British Mandate in 1918, and was sentenced to death, eventually fleeing to Iran, where spent the rest of his life. The Iranian government's criticism of his newspaper and writing intensified. By 1949, the Iranian government sent him as the Iranian Emperor's ambassador to the Ethiopian Empire and Yemen.

== Early life and family ==
Abbas Khalili was born in Najaf, Iraq on either 1895 or 1896. His family was religious and his father was Islamic cleric Sheikh Asad-Allāh. His brother was poet Jaafar al-Khalili. His uncle was Islamic scholar Mirza Hossein Khalili Tehrani.

During World War I (in 1918), the British occupied Iraq, which eventually lead to a resistance movement. Khalili was one of the twelve leaders of the Siege of Najaf (1918) in a group called the Society for Islamic Movement (Farsi: Jamʿiyat-e nahżat-e eslāmi; also known as The League of the Islamic Awakening in British publications). After the defeat of this uprising, he was sentenced to death by the British occupying forces, but after an adventurous trip, he managed to escape to Iran. For three years he was living in Rasht, and using the pseudonym Ali Fatiy-al-Eslām. Because of his accent speaking Farsi, he was nicknamed by locals Ḵalili-e Arab (English: Kalili the Arab).

== Career ==
=== Government work, politics ===
From 1922 until 1929, Ḵalili worked as a translator in the Iranian Legal Office of the Ministry of Justice (Edāra-ye ḥoquqi-e Wezārat-e ʿadliya).

Khalili served several government roles and he was appointed in 1949 as the Iranian Embassy in Yemen and Ethiopian Empire. He was active in the formation of the Iranian political party National Front (during the second front) in November 1958.

=== Newspaper publishing, editing, writing ===
He was a newspaper editor and publisher; he worked as an Arabic translator for Raad Emrooz, and he founded Eqdām newspaper. The Eqdām newspaper was considered an extremist and critical, which upset some and by 1927 the paper was suspended. He was also involved in working for the Iranian Baladiya newspaper, and Bahār monthly literary journal.

Khalili wrote poetry in both Persian and Arabic and has translated about 1100 verses of Ferdowsi's Shahnameh into Arabic and also published several novels. His novels all featured narration, often with the narrator being a woman telling a sad story.

== Personal life ==
Khalili was married four times, his first wife was Fakhr-Ozma Arghun (née Khalatbari) in 1924, which ended in divorce by 1931. His second wife was Māhmoneer Moeini-Azad. He had four sons, Mahyar, Shahyar, Kamyab, Faryar and two daughters, including poet Simin Behbahani in 1927.

He died on 25 February 1972 from a stroke in Tehran, Iran.

== Bibliography ==
=== Short stories, articles ===
- Khalili, Abbas (October 1921). Ruzgār-e siāh (in Persian).
- Khalili, Abbas (1925). Enteqām [Revenge]. Eqdām (in Persian). Tehran, Iran.
- Khalili, Abbas (1926). Asrār-e šab [Mysteries of the Night]. Eqdām (in Persian). Tehran, Iran.
- Khalili, Abbas (1931). Dāstān-e emruz [Today's Story]. Eqdām (in Persian). Tehran, Iran.
- Khalili, Abbas (1931). Šārlot [Charlotte]. Eqdām (in Persian). Tehran, Iran.
- Khalili, Abbas (1931). Čāl-e gāv [The Pit of a Cow]. Eqdām (in Persian). Tehran, Iran.
- Khalili, Abbas (1932). Fajāyeʾ [Tragedies]. Eqdām (in Persian). Tehran, Iran.

=== Novels, books ===
- Khalili, Abbas (1930). Ḵiālāt [Illusions] (collection of short stories) (in Persian). Tehran, Iran.
- Khalili, Abbas (1922). Pir-Čāk-e Irāni [Iranian Pir-Chak] (in Persian). Tehran, Iran.
- Khalili, Abbas (1927). Pir-Čāk-e Hendi [Indian Pir-Chak] (in Persian). Tehran, Iran.
- Khalili, Abbas (1925). Ensān [Mankind] (in Persian). Tehran, Iran.
