= Abbas Eqbal Ashtiani =

Iranian literary scholar, historian, translator and man of letters

Abbas Eqbal Ashtiani عباس اقبال آشتیانی
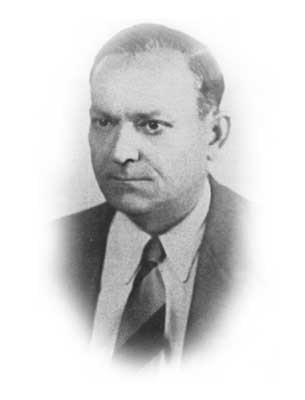
- Born: 1896/97; Ashtian, Qajar Iran
- Died: 10 February 1956; Rome, Italy
- Resting place: Shah-Abdol-Azim shrine
- Occupations: Literary Scholar, Historian, Translator and Man of letters
- Organization: member of the Academy of Persian Language and Literature

Abbas Eqbal Ashtiani (Persian: عباس اقبال آشتیانی; 1896/97 – 10 February 1956) was an Iranian literary scholar, historian, translator, and man of letters.

Eqbal Ashtiani was born in Ashtian. He was educated at Dar ul-Funun (House of Sciences) in Tehran and University of Paris. In 1944, Eqbal founded the monthly periodical Yādgār. Eqbal Ashtiani died in Rome, Italy and was buried at the Shah-Abdol-Azim shrine in Rey, Iran.

== Works ==
=== Studies ===
- Qābūs-e Vošmgīr-e Zīārī, Berlin, 1342/1923
- Šarḥ-e ḥāl-e ʿAbd-Allāh b. Moqaffaʿ, Berlin, 1306 Š./1927
- Ḵānadān-e Nowbaḵtī, Tehran, 1311 Š./1932
- Tārīḵ-e mofaṣṣal-e Īrān az estīlā-ye Mōḡol tā eʿlān-e Mašrūṭīyat I: Az ḥamla-ye Čengīz tā taškīl-e dawlat-e tīmūrī, Tehran, 1312 Š./1933, repr. Tehran, 1341 Š./1962
- Tārīḵ-e ektešāfāt-e jōḡrāfīāʾī wa tārīḵ-e ʿelm-e jōḡrāfīā, Tehran, 1314 Š./1935
- Moṭālaʿāt-ī dar bāra-ye Baḥrayn wa jazāyer wa sawāḥel-e Ḵalīj-e Fārs, Tehran, 1328 Š./1949
- Wezārat dar ʿahd-e salāṭīn-e bozorg-e saljūqī, ed. M.-T. Danešpažūh and Y. Ḏokāʾ, Tehran, 1338 Š./1959
- Mīrzā Taqī Ḵān Amīr-e Kabīr, ed. Ī. Afšār, Tehran, 1340 Š./1961
- Tārīḵ-e jawāher dar Īrān, in FIZ 9, 1340 Š./1961, pp. 5–45.

=== Texts edited ===
- Ebn Moʿtazz, Ṭabaqāt al-šoʿarāʾ al- moḥaddeṯīn (Arabic), facs. ed. with notes and variants, GMS 13, London, 1929
- Rašīd Vaṭvāṭ, Ḥadāʾeq al-seḥr fī daqāʾeq al-šeʿr, Tehran, 1309 Š./1930
- Abu’l-Maʿālī Moḥammad al-Ḥosaynī, Bayān al-adyān, Tehran, 1312 Š./1933
- Ebn Šahrāšūb, Maʿālem al-ʿolamāʾ, Tehran, 1313 Š./1934
- Mortażā b. Dāʿī Rāzī, Tabṣerat al-ʿawāmm fī maʿrefa maqālāt al-anām, Tehran, 1313 Š./1934
- Hendūšāh b. Sanjar Naḵjavānī, Tajāreb al-salaf, Tehran, 1313 Š./1934
- Abū Manṣūr Ṯaʿālebī, Tatemma al-yatīma, Tehran, /1934 (Arabic)
- Šāh-nāma (Borūḵīm ed.), vols. 2–6, Tehran, 1314 Š./1935
- Amīr Moʿezzī, Dīvān, Tehran, 1319 Š./1940
- Lōḡat-e fors, Tehran, 1320 Š./1941
- (selection of) Neẓām-al-Molk, Sīāsat-nāma, Tehran, 1320 Š./1941
- Ebn Esfandīār, Tārīḵ-e Ṭabarestān, Tehran, 1320 Š./1941
- Obayd Zākānī, Kolīyāt, Tehran, 1321 Š./1942
- Mīrzā Moḥammad Kalantar, Rūz-nāma-ye Mīrzā Moḥammad Kalāntar-e Fārs, Tehran, 1325 Š./1946
- Šaraf-al-Dīn Rāmī, Anīs al-ʿoššāq, Tehran, 1325 Š./1946
- Jahāngīr Mīrzā, Tārīḵ-e now, Tehran, 1327 Š./1948
- Moʿīn-al-Dīn Šīrāzī, Šadd al-ezār fī ḥaṭṭ al-awzār ʿan zowwār al-mazār (Arabic), Tehran, 1328 Š./1949 (with M. Qazvīnī)
- Nāṣer-al-Dīn Kermānī, Semṭ al-ʿolā le’l-ḥażra al-ʿolyā, Tehran, 1328 Š./1949
- Mīrzā Moḥammad-Ḵalīl Marʿašī Ṣafawī, Majmaʿ al-tawārīkò, Tehran, 1328 Š./1949
- Ḥosayn b. Abi’l-Reżā Āvī, Tarjama-ye Maḥāsen Eṣfaḥān-e Māfarrūḵī, Tehran, 1328 Š./1949
- Montajab-al-Dīn Jovaynī, ʿAtabat al-kataba, Tehran, 1329 Š./1950 (with M. Qazvīnī)
- Ḥamīd-al-Dīn Aḥmad b. Ḥāmed Kermānī, al-Możāf elā badāyeʿ al-azmān fī waqāyeʿ Kermān, Tehran, 1331 Š./1952
- Moḥammad Ḡazālī, Fażāʾel al-anām men rasāʾel Ḥojjat-al-Eslām, Tehran, 1333 Š./1954
- Šarḥ-e qaṣīda-ye ʿaynīya-e Ebn Sīnā, in MDAT 1/4, 1333 Š/1954
- Ḥakīm Awḥad-al-Dīn Ṭabīb Rāzī, Ḏayl-e Sayr al-ʿebād-e Sanāʾī, Tehran, 1334 Š./1955
- Abū Manṣūr Ṯaʿālebī, Tatemma al-yatīma, Tehran, 1313 Š./1934 (Arabic)

=== Translations ===
- “Une notice sur le Ghilan et le Mazandaran par M. le Colonel Trézel” (publ. with P. Jaubert, Voyage en Arménie et en Perse, Paris 1821) as Yāddāšthā-ye ženerāl Terezel ferestāda-ye Nāpelʾon be samt-e Hend, Tehran, 1308 Š./1929
- Alfred de Gardane, Mission du Général Gardane en Perse sous le Premiér Empire: Documents historiques publiés par son fils as Maʾmūrīyat-e Ženerāl Gārdān dar Īrān, Tehran, 1310 Š./1931
- R. S. Poole, The Coins of the Shahs of Persia, London, 1887 as Ṭabaqāt-e salāṭīn-e Eslām, Tehran, 1312 Š./1933
- Moḥammat b. Zakarīyāʾ Rāzī, al-Sīrat al-falsafīya as Sīrat-e falsafī-e Rāzī, Tehran, 1315 Š./1936
- Jean Baptiste Feuvrier, Trois ans à la cour de Perse, as Se sāl dar darbār-e Īrān, Tehran, 1326 Š./1947
