= Farzaneh Milani =

Iranian-American scholar and author (born 1947)

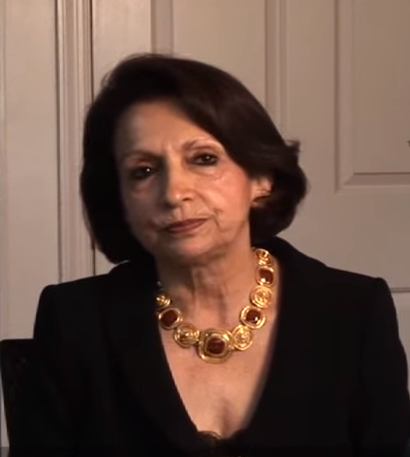
- Born: c. 1947; Tehran, Iran
- Education: California State University, East Bay, University of California, Los Angeles
- Occupations: Scholar, author, poet, translator, educator

Farzaneh Milani (Persian: فرزانه میلانی; born c. 1947) is an Iranian-born American scholar, author, poet, translator, and educator. Milani teaches Persian literature and women's studies at the University of Virginia; and serves as the Chair of the Department of Middle Eastern and South Asian Languages and Cultures. She is also a poet, award-winning translator, and a recipient of the Carnegie Fellowship and the National Endowment for the Humanities. Milani's 1992 book Veils and Words: the Emerging Voices of Iranian Women Writers (Syracuse, 1992), has seen its 16th printing.

== Biography ==
Milani was born in Tehran, Iran in about 1947, she was the only daughter in a family of five children. Milani had attended Catholic co-educational French schools before relocating to the United States.

She, her husband, and her unborn son arrived in America in December 1967. There, she attended the California State University, East Bay (formally California State University, Hayward), graduating with a BA degree in French Literature in 1970; and the University of California, Los Angeles, obtaining a PhD in Comparative Literature in 1979.

In 1986, after a four-year stint at her alma mater as an instructor of Persian Language and Literature, she took a position at the University of Virginia. At the University of Virginia, she has been the recipient of several awards, including the "All University Teaching Award" in 1998, and a "University Seminar's Teaching Award" in 2001. She received a Storr's Fellowship in 2001; a National Endowment for the Humanities grant in 2002–2003; and was a Carnegie Fellow from 2006 to 2007 for a project entitled "Remapping the Cultural Geography of Iran: Islam, Women, and Mobility." Her translation (with Kaveh Safa) of A Cup of Sin: Selected Poems of Simin Behbahani won the Lois Roth Literary Award in Translation.

Milani is the author of over 100 articles, op-eds, prologues, epilogues, forewords and afterwords in both Persian and English. She has guest edited two issues of Nimeye-Digar, a Persian-language feminist journal, IranNameh, and Iranian Studies: A Journal of the International Society for Iranian Studies. Her work has appeared in The New York Times, The Washington Post, Ms., Reader's Digest, USA Today, The Christian Science Monitor, and NPR's All Things Considered. She has presented more than 150 lectures in the United States and around the world.

From 1994 to 1996, Milani served as president of the Association of Middle Eastern Women Studies in America. In addition, she has served as executive officer of the American Association of Persian Teachers (1990 to 1993), on the board of executive directors of Middle East Studies Association of North America (1991-1994), on the editorial board of the Virginia Quarterly Review (2002 to 2005), on the advisory editorial board for The Encyclopedia of Women in Islamic Cultures (Brill Academic Publishers), and on Governor Warner's Council on the Status of Women in Virginia (2002 to 2005).

Her husband died in 2007. She published Words, Not Swords: Iranian Women Writers and the Freedom of Movement in 2011. In 2012 Milani was voted "Woman of the Year" by the Iranian Women Studies Foundation (IWSF).

== Bibliography ==
- Milani, Farzaneh. Forugh Farrokhzad (2016(: A Literary Biography with Unpublished Letters. This book is in Persian. PersianCircle; First Edition ISBN 978-0991896417
- Milani, Farzaneh (1992). Veils and Words: The Emerging Voices of Iranian Women Writers. Contemporary Issues in the Middle East. Syracuse University Press. ISBN 9780815625575.
- Behbahani, Simin (1999). Milani, Farzaneh; Safa, Kaveh (eds.). A Cup of Sin: Selected Poems. Middle East Literature In Translation. Farzaneh Milani (Translator), Kaveh Safa (Translator). ISBN 9780815605546.
- 2011: Words not Swords: Iranian Women and the Freedom of Movement
- Selected poems published in "Nimeye Digar", "Par", "Barrayand", "Daneshju", "Omid", and "Avaye Portland"
- 2016: Forugh Farrokhzad: A Literary Biography With Unpublished Letters, Persian Circle ISBN 978-0991896417
