= Siege of Najaf (1918) =

World War 1 Siege

- Part of the Mesopotamian campaign of World War I and the prelude of the 1920 Iraqi Revolt (Note: British Historiography sees this engagement primarily as an episode of World War I, whereas Iraqi Historiography sees this primarily as a prelude to the 1920 Iraqi Revolt.)
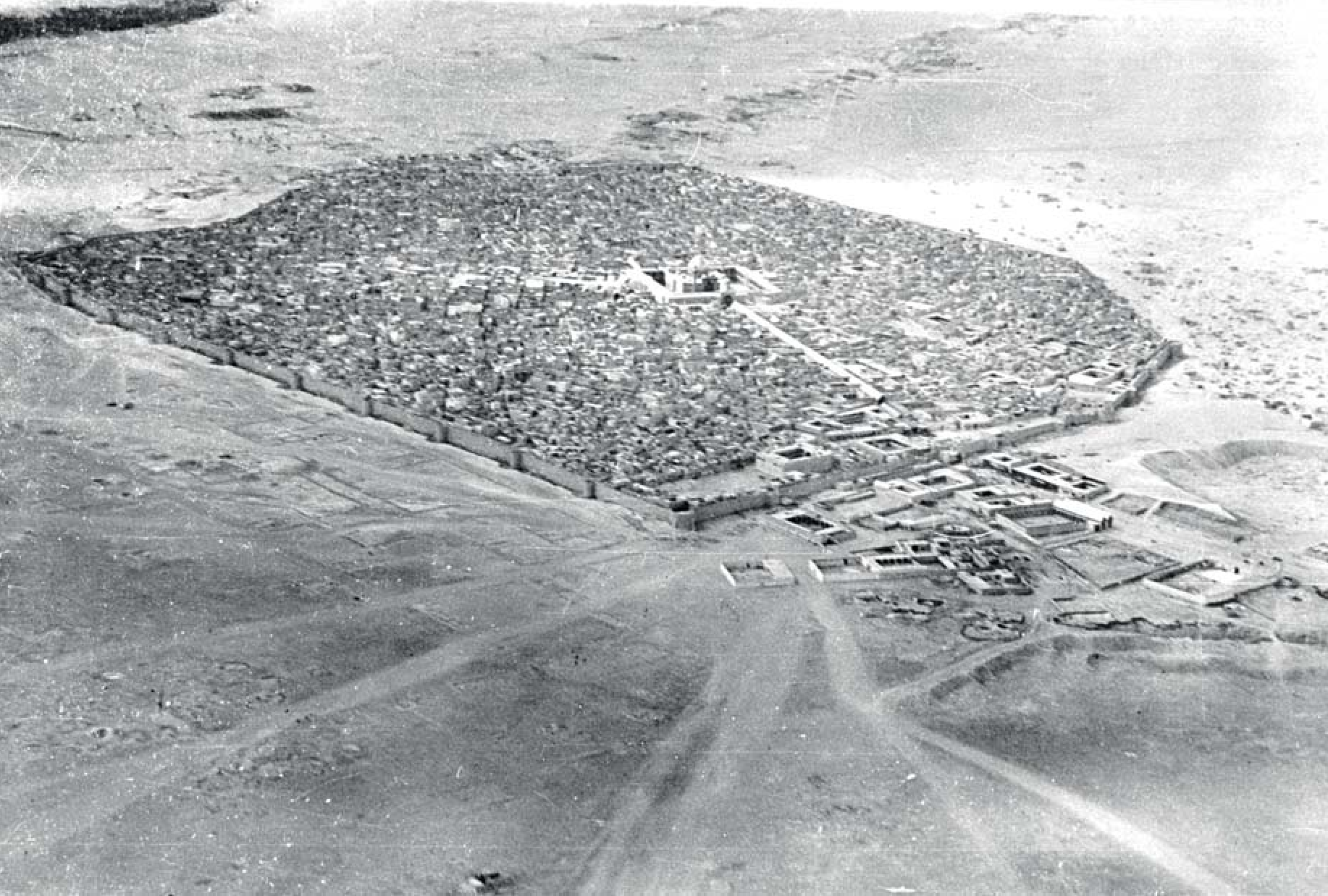
- Aerial view of Najaf, 1918
Date	23 March – 4 May 1918 (1 month, 1 week and 4 days)
Location	Najaf, Ottoman Iraq 32°N 44.33°E
Result	British victory

Belligerents
British Empire; Pro-British sheikhs: Saiyid Mahdi al Saivid Salman	Jam'iya al-Nahda al-Islamiya; Anti-British sheikhs: Haji 'Atiyah Abu Qulal; Kadhim Subhi; Haji Sa'ad ibn Haji Radhi

Commanders and leaders
(British Empire) Francis Balfour (British Empire) William M. Marshall †	Najm al-Baqqal (executed)... and others

Strength
1 brigade	~30,000 citizens
- Location within Iraq

The siege of Najaf was an engagement between the British Army and Iraqi rebels in the city of Najaf during the First World War. The city had fallen under the control of four sheikhs in 1915 after an anti-Ottoman uprising, and was put under British control in 1917. In 1918, as it became clear that the British were aiming to occupy rather than liberate Iraq, an anti-British movement named Jam'iya al-Nahda al-Islamiya was formed in Najaf to oppose British rule. The uprising began on 19 March when a British officer, William M. Marshall was assassinated in the citadel of Najaf. The British subsequently laid siege to the city on 23 March, cutting all supply routes to the city before it ultimately surrendered on 4 May 1918. Rebel leaders were sentenced to death on 25 May. The siege is often seen as a precursor to the 1920 Iraqi Revolt. The extent of the rebellion's impact on the development of Iraqi nationalism is disputed.

== Background ==
Following the Ottoman defeat in the Battle of Shaiba in mid-April 1915, the Ottoman authority in the eyes of Mesopotamian Arabs had been discredited. In the city of Najaf, locals felt confident enough to begin directly challenging local Ottoman authority, and were ready for an open revolt. There are 2 different accounts as to how the revolt began: According to the first account, after Ottoman troops forced women to lower their veils while turning over every last rock in pursuit of the absent men, resentments finally boiled over on 22 May as rebels laid siege to government buildings and the army barracks, erected checkpoints, and even tore up the telegraph poles for several miles to prevent any relief from reaching the garrison. After a 3-day long gun battle, the Ottoman governor in Baghdad negotiated the safe withdrawal of the soldiers stationed in the city. According to the second account, a survivor of the Battle of Shaiba, Karim al Haji Sa'ad, entered the town, which was under martial law at the time, with 30 men through a hole in the wall and resisted Ottoman attempts to retake Najaf for 24 hours, before help allowed him to secure the city, leading the Ottoman troops present to withdraw. Charles R. H. Tripp notes that although the revolt was anti-Ottoman in a broad sense, the uprising was not in support of the British war effort and instead intended to grant the city higher administrative autonomy.

In either case, the rebels had secured for themselves an independent city under the rule of 4 different sheikhs of the Zuqurt and Shumurt: Saiyid Mahdi al Saivid Salman, Haji 'Atiyah Abu Qulal, Kadhim Subhi and Haji Sa'ad ibn Haji Radhi. The sheikhs regularly looted from the citizens of Najaf under the justification of taxation. Najaf continued to trade with the Ottoman Empire while simultaneously strengthening its relations with Britain. All sources agree that the British captured Najaf in 1917, but disagree on the details: According to Abbas Kadhim, Najaf's independence ended in July 1917 when the British appointed captain Francis Balfour as political officer for Shamiyya and Najaf. According to British government documents, British rule began in August 1917 when Hamid Khan was appointed as the first government agent. According to Keiko Sakai, the pro-British Anaza tribe migrated to the vicinity of Najaf in October 1917, and when they were attacked by the Najafis for refusing to pay taxes, the British sent a force to directly assume control.

In early January 1918, a small number of British troops arrived in Kufa, which likely led the Najafi sheikhs to believe they were hard-pressed in other fronts. In mid-January, a British cavalry patrol was fired on by Najafis, and when the British demanded an explanation on 14 January, the Najafi sheikhs instead began attacking British posts and troops in Najaf, marking the start of an open revolt. Since the sheikhs were unable to mobilize popular support in Najaf, the British were able to swiftly recapture the city on 19 January, ending the first revolt. Najaf was given a fine of 50,000 rs and 500 rifles, which the sheikhs paid by looting from the citizens. However, tensions between Arabs and the British rose as it became increasingly clear that the British were aiming to occupy rather than liberate Iraq. This was clear from the new taxation system and the appointment of political officers to each area. In that year an anti-British organization in Najaf named Jam'iya al-Nahda al-Islamiya was established.

The leadership of Jam'iya al-Nahda al-Islamiya at this time were divided of whether or not to launch a revolt. A bazaar trader named Haji Najm al-Baqqal, who was a major member of the organization, hoped that a daring act of violence would provoke the entire city, or possibly even the entire country into an open revolt against Britain.

German agents had also been involved in encouraging the revolt, fostering the conspirators with gold.

William R. Marshall, British commander-in-chief of Mesopotamia, stated in a report to London that the political officer in Najaf, William M. Marshall, was popular among the local inhabitants at the time of the uprising, and attributed the uprising to enemy agents.

== Uprising and siege ==
In the morning of 19 March 1918, a number of Najafis led by Haji Najm al-Baqqal disguised as Shabanah, the British-employed Arab police, entered the citadel of Najaf where they assassinated Captain William M. Marshall, who had been stationed in the city since 1 February 1918. They were subsequently driven out of the citadel by members of the Punjabi guard, who then found themselves besieged by members of Jam'iya al-Nahda al-Islamiya. The initial revolt was co-led by Najaf's chief sheikh, Abu Qulal. The uprising was also supported by Kadhim Subhi, sheikh of Buraq, and Sa'ad ibn Haji Radhi, sheikh of Mushraq. Only the sheikh of Huwaysh, Saivid Salman, opposed the uprising, due to his personal rivalry with Abu Qulal. British captain Francis Balfour, stationed in Kufah, responded by evacuating half the police, while the other half sought refuge in al Saivid Salman's house. The rebels presented a set of demands to the British, voicing a desire to govern themselves without British interference.

It was not desired to treat the city, which contains one of the most holy shrines of the Shiahs and is surrounded by a very high wall, in an ordinary way, i.e., by shelling or by direct assault. A strict blockade was, therefore, ordered [...] The firmness with which the situation was handled, the fairness with which the law-abiding inhabitants were treated and the scrupulous care which was taken to avoid damage to holy persons and places, created a most favourable impression on all the surrounding tribes and contributed in no small degree to the subsequent establishment of friendly relations.

— William R. Marshall, (1 October 1918) reflecting on the uprising.

On 23 March, 4 days after the uprising began, the British began to besiege the city, surrounding the city with barbed wire. All supply lines to the city were cut off, leading to shortages in food and water. The Najafis took possession of a group of mounds, collectively known as Tel Huwaysh, and manned the city walls and bastions with troops armed mainly with abandoned Turkish rifles.

The British put forth 4 demands:

- The unconditional surrender of certain persons known to be the ringleaders and supposed to be among the attacking party.
- A fine of 1,000 rifles
- A fine of Rs. 50,000
- Deportation of 100 persons to India as prisoners of war
  - Until the above conditions are fulfilled the town will be blockaded and the food and water supply will be cut off

Over the next 2 weeks, sporadic rifle fire was exchanged between the British and Najafi forces while the siege was increasingly tightened. The Najafis tried to seek help from the tribes, but their messenger was caught crossing British lines, and executed.

On 7 April, the British launched a large artillery barrage and captured the Huwaish mounds dominating the town with 2 Indian battalions and evacuated officials. Unable to endure the siege, the rebels finally surrendered on 4 May and the blockade was declared at an end. Rebel leaders were sentenced to death on 25 May.

== Aftermath ==
After the failure of the revolt, one of the uprising's ringleaders wrote the following poem prior to facing execution:

[...] We [rebelled] with the strongest of determination,
Forbidding us from fearing death or from compromising.
And with the highest of zeal,
Did not accept compromise despite our loved ones.
We used it to guard the Prophet's way,
The Prophet of enlightenment and the book of revelation.
And we preserved the pride of the Iraqi people,
And we were to their noblest a sturdy rampart.
And we waged battles and it was death,
In defence of the Muslims' scholars.
And the formations of our enemies the English,
Fill the landscape in its entirety.
They attack the people of Ya'rib [one of the 'fathers' of the Arabs],
To cure their [the British] resentment and bitterness.
And their planes fill the sky,
Dropping bombs like a deadly rain.
[...] We saw storms of death,
But what we saw was easy for us.
When we were captives in the enemy's hands,
We suffered a deep and growing pain.
And the injustices against the holy city [Najaf] and all Iraq,
The lion [the rebels] left his den.
But we coped with the sadness,
And we wait for death from one moment to the next.

— Mohammad Jawad al Jaza'iri

The uprising in Najaf was limited, local and short-lived. But the Iraqis had learned an important lesson: they could not successfully overthrow the British authorities without involvement of the tribes. A new uprising in 1920 would be much larger in scope and duration, but would nonetheless still be ultimately suppressed by the British.

In 2015, a basic historical outline of the Najaf revolt entered the Iraqi educational curriculum, becoming part of the national history textbook for twelfth graders.

== Leading figures ==
=== British army ===
- Francis Cecil Campbell Balfour (8 December 1884 – 16 April 1965) was a British military officer and colonial administrator of Shamiyya. He organized the siege of the city. After the siege, he was thanked by the killidar of Najaf, suggesting that the rebels may have been attempting to curb the power of the clergy while in power.
- William Macandrew Marshall (6 February 1889 – 19 March 1918) was a British Indian Army captain. He had performed military service since 1908. By 1915, during World War I, he served as the captain of the 37th Dogras regiment, serving in Mesopotamia. He fought in the Siege of Kut and partook in the conquest of Baghdad. On 1 February 1918, Marshall was stationed in Najaf, a city he would come to administer over the following weeks. Lieutenant General Sir William R. Marshall, British commander-in-chief of Mesopotamia, said he was popular among local inhabitants. In the morning of 19 March 1918, a number of Najafis led by Haji Najm al-Baqqal disguised as Shabanah, the British-employed Arab police, entered the citadel of Najaf where they assassinated Marshall.

=== Rebels ===
There were 12 ringleaders in total.

- Haji Najm al-Baqqal (d. 25 May 1918) was a rebel ringleader. Prior to the uprising, he was a bazaar trader. He initiated the uprising by assassinating William M. Marshall on 19 March 1919. Several of al-Baqqal's associates recounted that he assassinated Marshall because he wanted to atone for deserting the Ottoman army in 1915.
- Abbas Khalili (1895 or 1896 – 10 February 1972) was a rebel ringleader. He was born in Najaf. He evaded execution by fleeing to Iran, where he spent the rest of his life and became a diplomat, newspaper publisher, poet and novelist.
- Mohammad Jawad al Jaza'iri (d. 25 May 1918) was a rebel ringleader and poet.

== Historiography ==
Traditional Iraqi historiography sees the 1918 uprising in Najaf as a "test-run" of the later Iraqi revolt against the British. This is part of a nationalist narrative of early-modern Iraqi history that seeks to place major events under an all-encompassing drive towards Iraqi independence. However, this view is contested by Haddad (2012), who states that the "Najafi rebellion was a localized affair that fed off the anti British sentiments of the jihad movement. In other words, what ideological motivation that accompanied the rebellion still revolved around the Muslim– infidel dichotomy." and that they fought as "Arab Muslims or Najafi Muslims but not yet as primarily Iraqi Muslims". To support his view, he notes that the initial Najafi demands to the British did not contain any mention of Iraq. However, he does not believe that the rebellion was completely unrelated to the formation of Iraqi nationalism, saying that the rebellion "strengthened anti-British sentiment and added to a sense of collective grievance against the British".

Harba (2020) provides a more in-depth examination of the evolving British and Iraqi historiographies on the Najafi uprising.
