= Fakhr-Ozma Arghun =

Iranian teacher, journalist and poet

Fakhr-Ozma Arghun (1898–1966) was an early feminist in Iran who focused on girls’ education and women's rights. She advocated for more women to enter educational and intellectual spaces during the late Qajar and early Pahlavi eras. Arghun was born into a politically active and highly educated family. She became a teacher, writer, and journalist. Her feminist activism focused on highlighting women's strength and on opposing conformity to women's traditional roles inside the home.

== Early life and background ==
Fakhr-Ozma Arghoun was born in 1898 in Tehran. Her father was Colonel Mohammed Ali Khan Arghoun, who served in the Iranian military. Her mother was Qamar Khanom Azmat ol-Saltaneh, who came from a very prominent political family that supported their daughter's education. The majority of Iranian girls at the time did not receive much education. Arghoun's parents believed their daughter deserved the same education as their sons, and they were all taught at home by private tutors. Arghoun was educated in Persian literature, Arabic, French, religious subjects, and modern science. She graduated from the Jean d’Arc French School for Girls in Tehran. Arghoun also studied at the Iran Bethel School where she learned Persian music. Later, Arghoun became one of the first women to accept a teaching position at the Namus School, founded in 1907 by Tuba Azmudeh, the first Iranian school for girls in Iran. Although we do not know exactly when Arghoun worked there, she taught French and Persian literature. Her teaching experiences led her to be more interested in advocating for women's access to education and opportunities in public life.

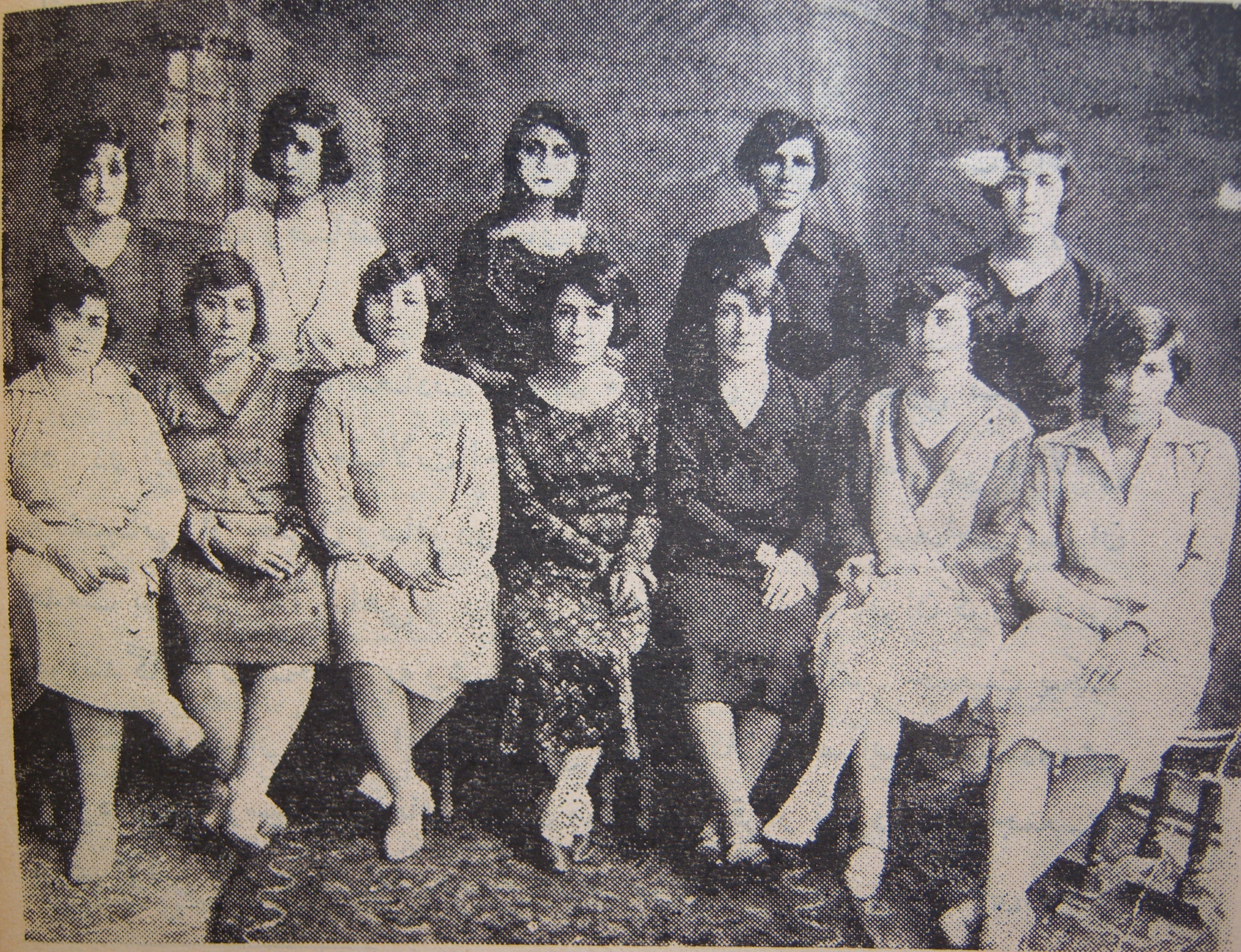
The board of directors of Jam'iyat-e Nesvan-e Vatankhah, a women's right association in Tehran active from 1922 to 1933, sits for a group photograph.

== Teaching and women's rights activism ==
Arghoun worked as a teacher in girls’ schools in Tehran, where she taught French and Persian literature. As a teacher, Arghoun saw firsthand how limited the access to education was for girls. This shaped her commitment to fight for women's rights. She believed that girls deserved the same education as boys, and this belief appears often in her poems.

In 1922, she helped establish the Jam'iyat-e Nesvan-e Vatankhah, also known as the Patriotic Women's League of Iran. The league, active from 1922 to 1933, was one of Iran's first women's rights groups. They fought for women's rights and social reform, focusing on promoting education for women and combating patriarchal views on women's place in society. She also later took part in Kanun e Banovan, an Iranian women's rights organization, giving speeches that emphasized women's rights and the need for public participation. Arghoun used her writing to forward her feminist work by magnifying women's voices.

== Early publications and literary career ==
Although Fakhr-Ozma Arghoun did not publish a poetry book during her lifetime, she wrote poems extensively in newspapers and magazines, some of the few forums available to women writers at the time. Her first public recognition came when she sent a patriotic poem to the newspaper Eghdam, and the editor, Abbas Khalili, published it. That first poem led to a long working relationship, and the two later married.

Arghoun helped launch Majaleh Banovan (Women's Magazine), after the 1936 unveiling decree also known as the Kashf-e hijab. This decree banned women from wearing a veil in public as a part of an effort to modernize and Westernize. She helped launch Majaleh Banovan to create a space for women to participate in social discussions surrounding the unveiling degree, and was a voice of support for the Kashf-e hijab. She later wrote for the newspaper Ayandeh Iran (Future of Iran). Her role in that publication as a leading figure was unusual, since most newspapers were run and edited by men. She used these magazines and papers to write about women's education, social change, and national issues.

Arghoun's poetry was often political, especially during the foreign occupation of Iran during World War II. She criticized this in her poems by writing: "Fill the country with tulips grown in the blood of traitors a river of blood must flow from every side of the country." She also addressed claims that women were less capable than men, famously asking: "If weakling be me, then why on my shoulder lies the task of nurturing robust men?" Across her life, her poems blend social criticism and support for women's rights.

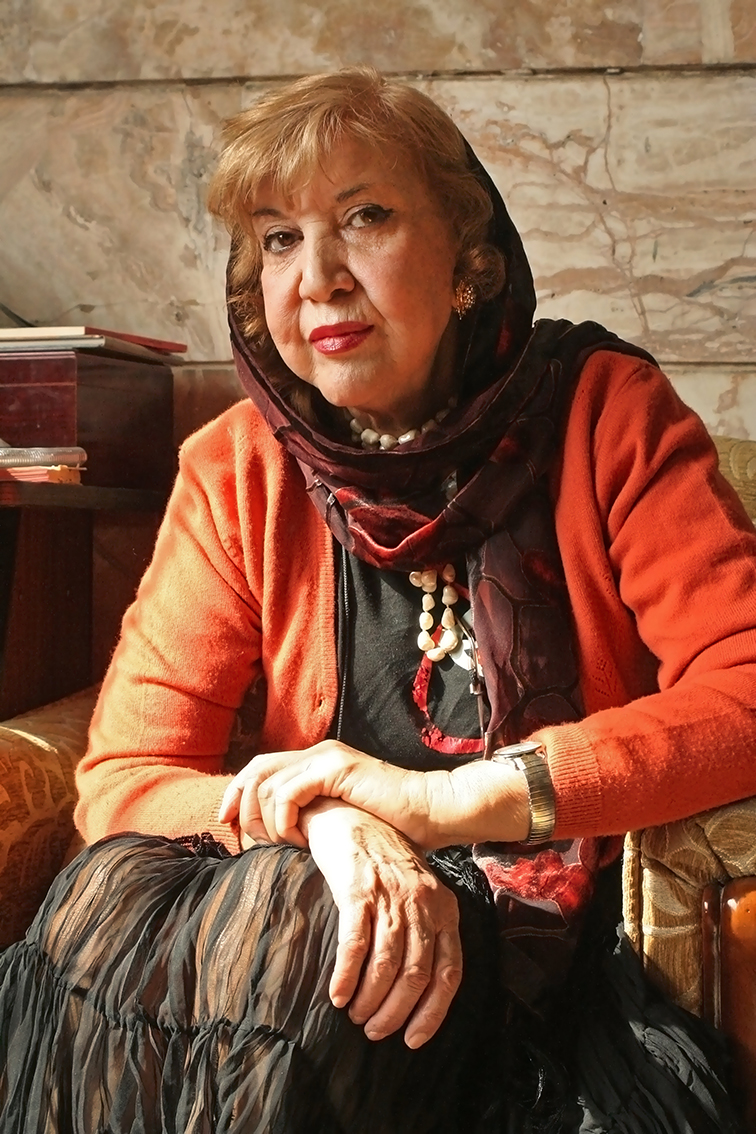
Simin Behbahani sits for a portrait on February 10th, 2007.

== Family ==
Arghoun married journalist, novelist, translator, poet, and politician Abbas Khalili in 1924. Arghoun first became close with Khalili through a shared love of poetry. Khalili often used his writings to criticize political corruption and promoted literacy for all. Arghoun and Khalili had a daughter, their only child, Simin Behbahani, who later became one of Iran's most famous poets. Arghoun greatly influenced her daughter, Simin Behbahani’s literary development and interest in women's rights. Arghoun introduced Behbahani to poetry, writing, and her dedication to art inspired her daughter to take a similar path. Behbahani wrote more than six hundred poems in twenty books and was widely known for her public opposition to gender injustice. She was nominated twice for a Nobel Prize in Literature.

== Preservation of work and legacy ==
Arghoun's works are scattered in newspapers and magazines. She is often cited in academic research surrounding gender and society. Her poems were often printed in periodicals, rather than in a single published volume. Arghoun is remembered as a poet, teacher, editor, and early voice for women's rights in Iran. Arghoun's influence lives on today through her feminist literature in discussions forums and as a source of inspiration for other Iranian feminists who often quote her writing.
