= Simin Behbahani =

Persian poet (1927–2014)

- سیمین بهبهانی
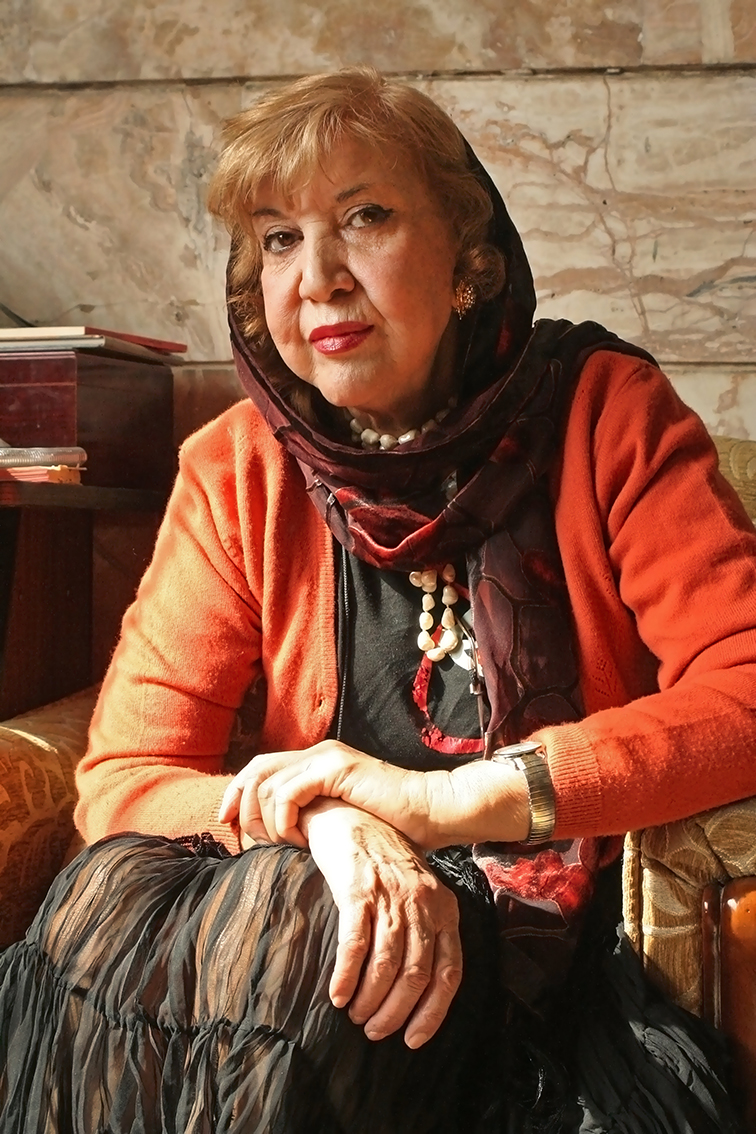
- Simin Behbahani in 2007
- Born: 20 July 1927; Tehran, Imperial State of Persia
- Died: 19 August 2014 (aged 87); Tehran, Iran
- Burial place: Behesht-e Zahra
- Other names: Simin Bihbahani, Simin Khalili
- Education: University of Tehran
- Occupations: Poet, lyricist, writer
- Spouses: Hassan Behbahani (m. 1946; div. 1970) Manouchehr Koshyar (m. 1971; died 1984)
- Parents: Abbas Khalili (father); Fahr-Ozma Arghun (mother)

Simin Behbahani (also spelled Bihbahani; née Siminbar Khalili; Persian: سیمین بهبهانی; 20 July 1927 – 19 August 2014) was an Iranian poet, lyricist, and activist. Renowned for her mastery of the ghazal, a traditional poetic form, she became an icon of modern Persian poetry. The Iranian intelligentsia and literati affectionately referred to her as the "Lioness of Iran."

In the course of her career, Behbahani was twice nominated for the Nobel Prize in Literature and received numerous literary accolades from around the world. Her work not only enriched Persian literature but also highlighted her role as a significant cultural and intellectual figure in Iran.

== Early life and family ==
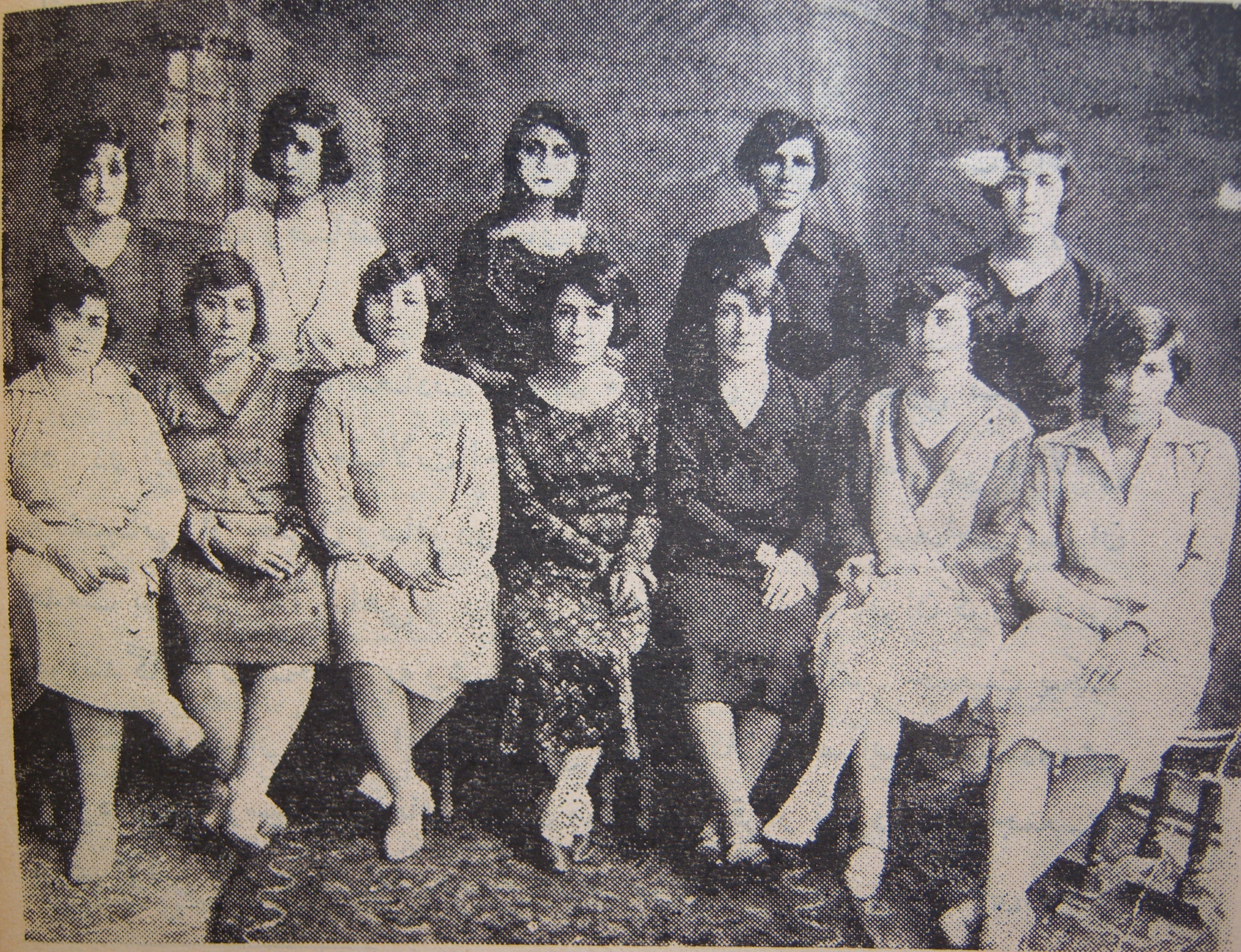
Board of governors of Association of Patriotic Women, Tehran, 1922

Simin Behbahani, whose name at birth was Siminbar Khalili (Persian: سیمین بر خلیلی) (سيمين بر خليلی), was the daughter of Abbas Khalili, a poet, diplomat, newspaper publisher, and editor of the Aghdam (English: action) newspaper, and Fakhr-Ozma Arghun, a poet and teacher of the French language. Abbās Khalili wrote poetry in both Persian and Arabic and he translated some 1,100 verses of Ferdowsi's Shahnameh into Arabic. Fakhr-Ozma Arghun was one of the progressive women of her time and a member of Kānun-e Nesvān-e Vatan'khāh (Association of Patriotic Women) between 1925 and 1929. In addition to her membership of Hezb-e Democrāt (Democratic Party) and Kānun-e Zanān (Women's Association), she was for a time (1932) editor of the Āyandeh-ye Iran (Future of Iran) newspaper. She taught French at the Nāmus, Dār ol-Mo'allemāt and No'bāvegān secondary schools in Tehran.

== Career ==
Simin Behbahani started writing poetry at twelve and published her first poem at the age of fourteen. She used the "Char Pareh" style of Nima Yooshij and subsequently turned to ghazal. Behbahani contributed to a historic development by adding theatrical subjects and daily events and conversations to poetry using the ghazal style of poetry. She has expanded the range of traditional Persian verse forms and has produced some of the most significant works of Persian literature in the 20th century.

She was President of the Iranian Writers' Association and was nominated for the Nobel Prize in Literature in 1999 and 2002. In 2013, she was awarded the Janus Pannonius Grand Prize for Poetry.

In early March 2010, she could not leave the country due to official prohibitions. As she was about to board a plane to Paris, police detained her and interrogated her "all night long". She was released but without her passport. Her English translator, Farzaneh Milani, expressed surprise at the arrest and detention, as Behbahani was then 82 and nearly blind, "we all thought that she was untouchable."

== Social activities ==
In 1988, during the mass execution of Iranian political and ideological prisoners, Simin Behbahani composed a poem titled "O Mothers". During a protest gathering of the Iranian women's movement in Daneshjoo Park, Simin Behbahani was attacked by police officers. She filed a complaint with the Judiciary of the Islamic Republic of Iran against the officer who had assaulted her, but according to her lawyer, Nasrin Sotoudeh, "the case was closed in the end." On 1 September 2008, Behbahani, along with a group of women's rights activists, appeared at the Islamic Consultative Assembly (Parliament of Iran) to protest the proposed Family Protection Bill. Addressing a member of parliament, she said: "Sir, I did not vote for you, because I do not even recognize your parliament, but I came here to tell you not to betray the people who voted for you. Do not allow a bill to pass that is against the women of Iran."

"You are not dead, nor will you die you will always live on, you have eternal life, you are the call of the Iranian people."— Simin Behbahani, in praise of Neda Agha-Soltan.

On 8 March 2010, when Behbahani was about to travel to Paris for medical treatment and to deliver a speech on International Women's Day, she was stopped by security agents. Her passport was confiscated at the airport, and she was informed that she was “banned from leaving the country.”

Behbahani’s English translator, Farzaneh Milani, expressed astonishment at her arrest and several hours of interrogation at the age of 82, when she was almost completely blind.

Until her death, Simin Behbahani served as the honorary chair of the board of trustees of the Sedigheh Dowlatabadi Library.

== Personal life ==
She had two marriages, the first was to Hassan Behbahani and it ended in divorce. She had three children from her first marriage, one daughter and two sons. Her second marriage was to Manuchehr Koushyar and it ended when he died in 1984.

== Death ==
Behbahani was hospitalized on 6 August 2014. She remained in a coma from 6 August until her death on 19 August 2014, and died in Tehran's Pars Hospital of pulmonary heart disease at the age of 87. Her funeral, attended by thousands, was held on 22 August in Vahdat Hall, and her body was buried at Behesht-e Zahra.

== Works ==
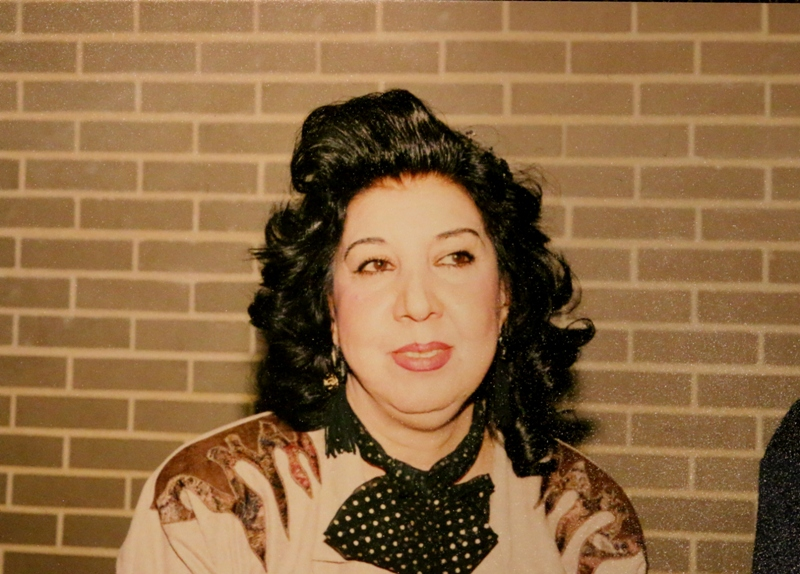
Simin Behbahani in Washington DC, ca. 1990.

- The Broken Lute [Seh-tar-e Shekasteh, 1951]
- Footprint [Ja-ye Pa, 1954]
- Chandelier [Chelcheragh, 1955]
- Marble [Marmar 1961]
- Resurrection [Rastakhiz, 1971]
- A Line of Speed and Fire [Khatti ze Sor'at va Atash, 1980]
- Arzhan Plain [Dasht-e Arzhan, 1983]
- Paper Dress [Kaghazin Jameh, 1992]
- A Window of freedom [Yek Daricheh Azadi, 1995]
- Collected Poems [Tehran 2003]
- Maybe It's the Messiah [Shayad ke Masihast, Tehran 2003] Selected Poems, translated by Ali Salami
- A Cup of Sin, Selected poems, translated by Farzaneh Milani and Kaveh Safa

== Awards and honours ==
- 1998 – Human Rights Watch Hellman-Hammet Grant
- 1999 – Carl von Ossietzky Medal
- 2006 – Norwegian Authors' Union Freedom of Expression Prize
- 2009 – mtvU Poet Laureate
- 2013 – Janus Pannonius Poetry Prize, from the Hungarian PEN Club

== English translations ==
- A Cup of Sin: Selected Poems, translated by Farzaneh Milani and Kaveh Safa (Syracuse University Press, 1999) ISBN 978-0815605546

== See also ==
- Mina Assadi
- Parvin E'tesami
- Forugh Farrokhzad
- Leila Kasra
- Sholeh Wolpé
- List of Iranian women writers and poets
