= Siyavashan Rural District =

Rural district in Markazi province, Iran

Siyavashan Rural District Persian: دهستان سياوشان
- Rural District
- Location within Iran
- Coordinates: 34°26′N 49°56′E
- Country: Iran
- Province: Markazi
- County: Ashtian
- District: Central
- Established: 1987
- Capital: Siyavashan

Population (2016)
  - Total: 1,849
- Time zone: UTC+3:30 (IRST)

Siyavashan Rural District (Persian: دهستان سياوشان) is in the Central District of Ashtian County, Markazi province, Iran. Its capital is the village of Siyavashan.

== Demographics ==
=== Population ===
At the time of the 2006 National Census, the rural district's population was 2,610 in 826 households. There were 1,975 inhabitants in 763 households at the following census of 2011. The 2016 census measured the population of the rural district as 1,849 in 722 households. The most populous of its 14 villages was Siyavashan, with 686 people.

=== Other villages in the rural district ===
- Cheshmeh-ye Allahverdi
- Dastjerdeh
- Feyzabad
- Jafarabad
- Najafabad
- Nowdeh
- Tajabad
