= Garakan Rural District =

Rural district in Markazi province, Iran

Garakan Rural District Persian: دهستان گركان
- Rural District
- Location within Iran
- Coordinates: 34°33′N 49°56′E
- Country: Iran
- Province: Markazi
- County: Ashtian
- District: Central
- Established: 1987
- Capital: Garakan

Population (2016)
  - Total: 2,603
- Time zone: UTC+3:30 (IRST)

Garakan Rural District (Persian: دهستان گركان) is in the Central District of Ashtian County, Markazi province, Iran. Its capital is the village of Garakan.

== Demographics ==
=== Population ===
At the time of the 2006 National Census, the rural district's population was 4,224 in 1,134 households. There were 2,773 inhabitants in 989 households at the following census of 2011. The 2016 census measured the population of the rural district as 2,603 in 959 households. The most populous of its 13 villages was Garakan, with 660 people.

=== Other villages in the rural district ===
- Ahu
- Bon Chenar
- Khvorcheh
- Mohsenabad
- Musaabad
- Naderabad
- Sadabad
- Seqer Juq
- Shureh-ye Pain
- Zarnusheh
