= Do Gush, Behbahan =

Do Gush دوگوش
- Village
- Location within Iran
- Coordinates: 30°30′37″N 50°13′03″E
- Country: Iran
- Province: Khuzestan
- County: Behbahan
- Bakhsh: Central
- Rural District: Howmeh

Population (2006)
  - Total: 11
- Time zone: UTC+3:30 (IRST)
  - Summer (DST): UTC+4:30 (IRDT)

Do Gush (Persian: دوگوش, also Romanized as Do Gūsh) is a village in Howmeh Rural District, in the Central District of Behbahan County, Khuzestan Province, Iran. At the 2006 census, its population was 11, in 5 families.
