= Sararud-e Sofla =

Sararud-e Sofla سرارودسفلي
- Village
- Location within Iran
- Coordinates: 34°20′08″N 47°19′25″E
- Country: Iran
- Province: Kermanshah
- County: Kermanshah
- Bakhsh: Central
- Rural District: Dorudfaraman

Population (2006)
  - Total: 505
- Time zone: UTC+3:30 (IRST)
  - Summer (DST): UTC+4:30 (IRDT)

Sararud-e Sofla (Persian: سرارودسفلي, also Romanized as Sarārūd-e Soflá; also known as Sarārū, Sarārūd, Sarārūd-e Pā‘īn, and Sararūd-e Pā’īn) is a village in Dorudfaraman Rural District, in the Central District of Kermanshah County, Kermanshah Province, Iran. At the 2006 census, its population was 505, in 129 families.
