= Sara Rud, Gilan =

Sara Rud سرارود
- Village
- Location within Iran
- Coordinates: 37°07′07″N 49°56′24″E
- Country: Iran
- Province: Gilan
- County: Siahkal
- Bakhsh: Central
- Rural District: Malfejan

Population (2006)
  - Total: 47
- Time zone: UTC+3:30 (IRST)

Sara Rud (Persian: سرارود, also Romanized as Sarā Rūd) is a village in Malfejan Rural District, in the Central District of Siahkal County, Gilan Province, Iran. At the 2016 census, its population was 33, in 11 families. Down from 47 in 2006.
