= Ashtian =

City in Markazi province, Iran

Ashtian Persian: آشتيان
- City
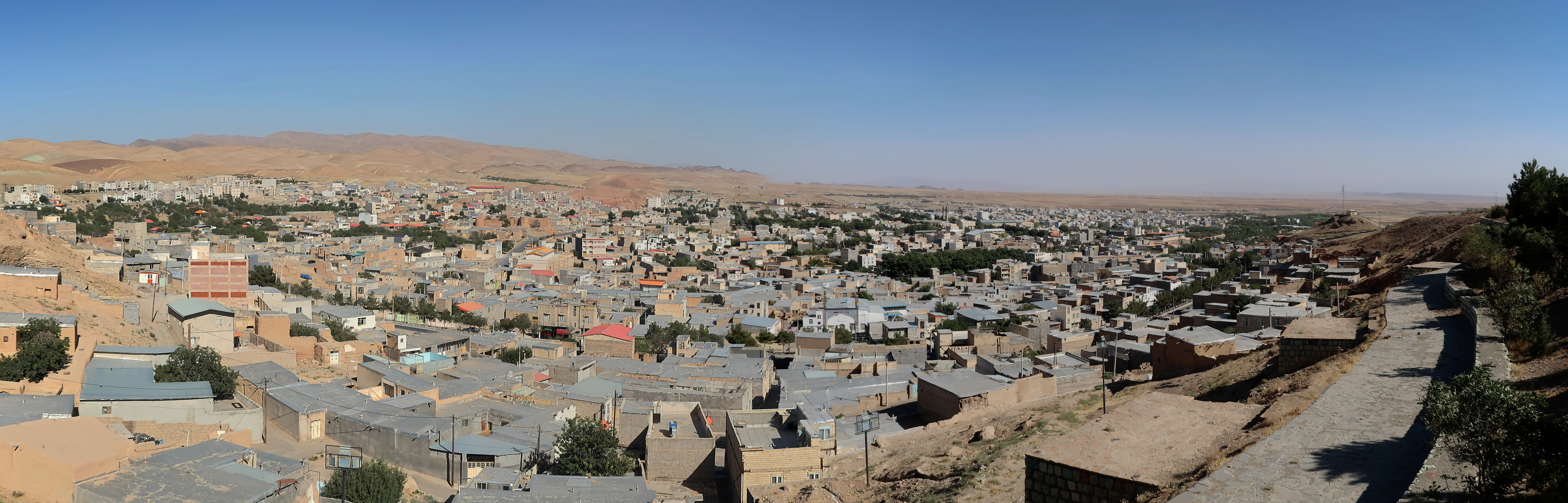

- Location within Iran
- Coordinates: 34°31′20″N 50°00′25″E
- Country: Iran
- Province: Markazi
- County: Ashtian
- District: Central

Population (2016)
  - Total: 8,763
- Time zone: UTC+3:30 (IRST)

Ashtian (Persian: آشتيان) (Note: Also romanized as Āshtīān and Ashtīyan) is a city in the Central District of Ashtian County, Markazi province, Iran, serving as capital of both the county and the district.

== Demographics ==
=== Language and religion ===
The people of Ashtian speak a peculiar Persian dialect known as Ashtiani. They follow the Shia branch of Islam.

=== Population ===
At the time of the 2006 National Census, the city's population was 8,324 in 2,597 households. The following census in 2011 counted 9,015 people in 2,704 households. The 2016 census measured the population of the city as 8,763 people in 2,788 households.

== Overview ==
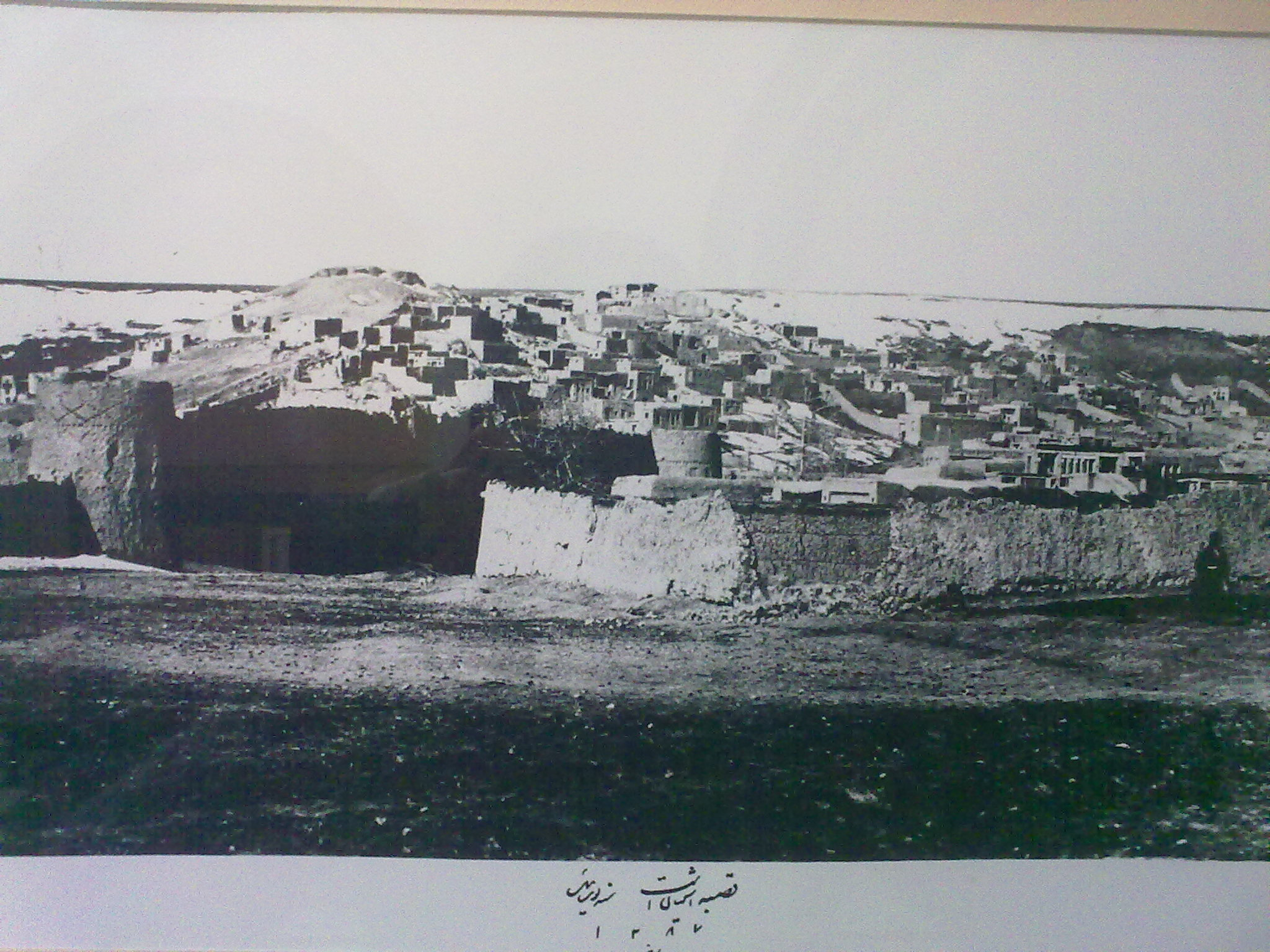
Ashtian

Ashtian lies in a fertile agricultural district, watered by surface streams and qanats. The region, which traditionally belonged to Tafresh County is a famous one for carpet-weaving. Among its historical monuments is the remains of a fortress and a Safavid era caravanserai.

In the past, a large number of Iranian courtiers and calligraphers were from the Tafresh and Ashtian regions. Several learned men and religious figures have stemmed from Ashtian. The Mostowfi family of Ashtian occupied several roles within the Qajar and Pahlavi administrative system. Abbās Eqbāl Āshtiyāni (عباس اقبال آشتیانی), a celebrated Iranian literary figure, and Abdolkarim Gharib, founder of geological research in Iran, were born in Ashtian. Father of Dr Mohammad Gharib, founder of modern Paediatrics in Iran, was also a native of Ashtian.

== Ashtian Earth Dam ==
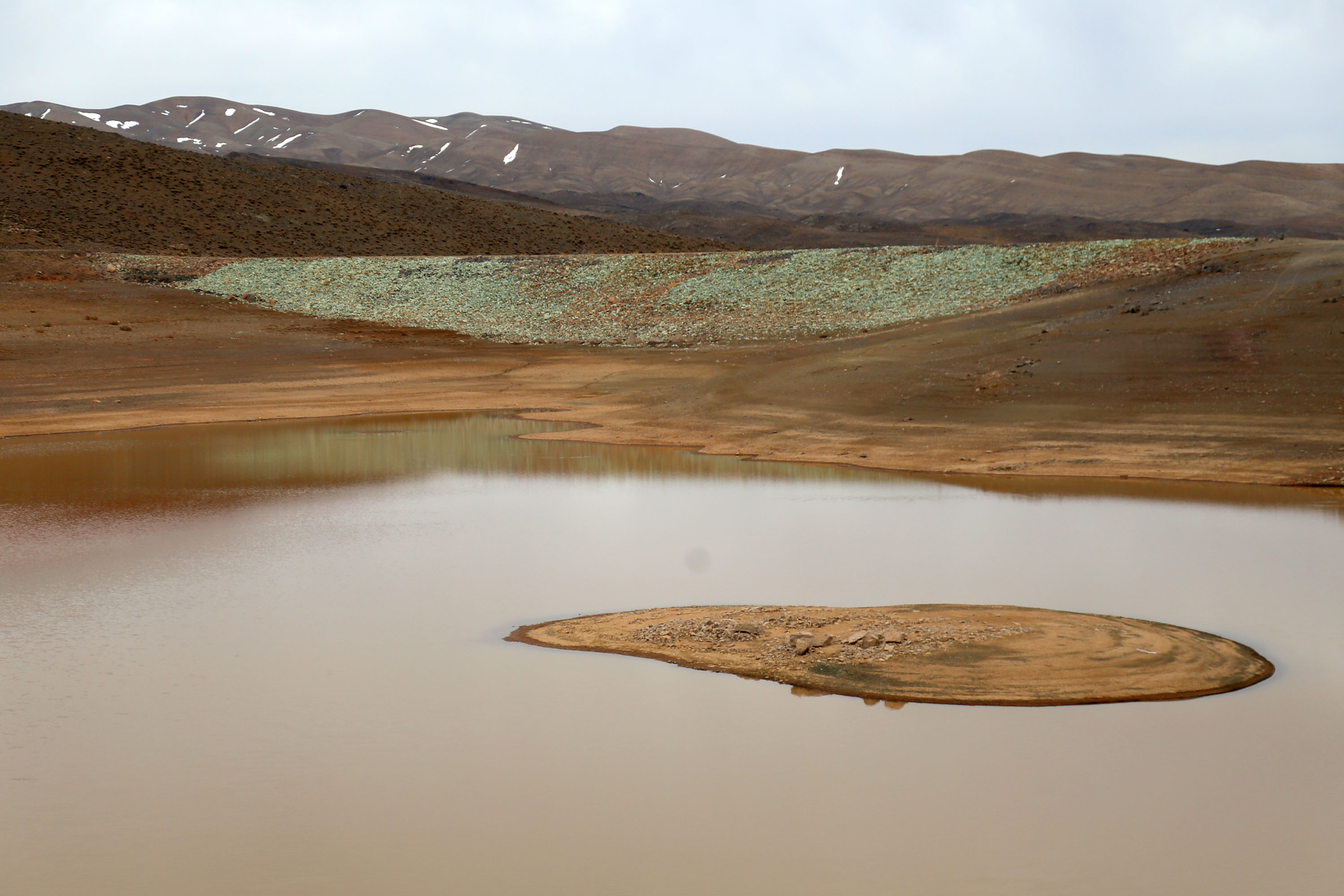
Ashtian Earth Dam

Ashtian Earth Dam (some locals say: Band-e-Naghi Beyk) at the elevation of 2224m above sea level is one of the tourism attraction areas near Ashtian city after Kardijan and Hezarabad villages. The amount of water stored has reduced in recent years. In March, it is still cold and the water temperature is about 13 °C. Some interesting birds, foxes, and other species of wildlife, insects, plants, etc., are in this area.

== See also ==
- Ashtiyani dialect
