= Sararud-e Olya =

Sararud-e Olya سرارودعليا
- Village
- Location within Iran
- Coordinates: 34°19′16″N 47°20′24″E
- Country: Iran
- Province: Kermanshah
- County: Kermanshah
- Bakhsh: Central
- Rural District: Dorudfaraman

Population (2006)
  - Total: 54
- Time zone: UTC+3:30 (IRST)
  - Summer (DST): UTC+4:30 (IRDT)

Sararud-e Olya (Persian: سرارودعليا, also Romanized as Sarārūd-e ‘Olyā, Sarā Rūd-e ‘Olyā, and Serā Rūd-e ‘Olyā; also known as Sarādūd-e Bālā, Sarārū, and Sarārūd-e Bālā) is a village in Dorudfaraman Rural District, in the Central District of Kermanshah County, Kermanshah Province, Iran. At the 2006 census, its population was 54, in 12 families.
