= Leonard Fielding Nalder =

Governor of Fung Province
- In office 1927–1930

Governor of Mongalla Province
- In office 5 December 1930 – 1936
- Preceded by: Francis Balfour

Personal details
- Born: 1888 Alexandria, Ottoman Empire (present-day Egypt)
- Died: 1958 (aged 69–70)

Leonard Fielding Nalder CMG CIE CBE (1888–1958) was a British colonial administrator who was Governor in turn of Fung Province (1927–1930) and Mongalla province (1930–1936) in the Anglo-Egyptian Sudan.

Fielding was born in 1888 and educated at Rugby School and Corpus Christi College, Oxford. He joined the Sudan Political Service and was posted to Khartoum in 1912, then to the Red Sea Province from 1913 to 1917. He was temporarily transferred to serve in Mesopotamia and Iraq between 1917 and 1922. Between 1923 and 1926 he served in Kordofan and Khartoum. In 1927 he was a member of the Turko-Iraq Frontier Delimitation Commission. In 1927 he was appointed Governor of Fung Province, and in 1930 Governor of Mongalla province, serving in this position until his retirement in 1936.

Nalder was appointed a Companion of the Order of the Indian Empire (CIE) in the 1919 Birthday Honours in connection with military operations in Mesopotamia, a Commander of the Order of the British Empire (CBE) in 1921 again in connection with military operations in Mesopotamia and NW Persia, and a Companion of the Order of St Michael and St George (CMG) in the 1928 Birthday Honours for service as the Anglo-Iraq delegate on the Turco-Iraq Frontier Delimitation Commission.
