= Mazraeh Now Rural District =

Rural district in Markazi province, Iran

Mazraeh Now Rural District Persian: دهستان مزرعه نو
- Rural District
- Location within Iran
- Coordinates: 34°25′N 50°12′E
- Country: Iran
- Province: Markazi
- County: Ashtian
- District: Central
- Established: 1987
- Capital: Mazraeh Now

Population (2016)
  - Total: 3,142
- Time zone: UTC+3:30 (IRST)

Mazraeh Now Rural District (Persian: دهستان مزرعه نو) is in the Central District of Ashtian County, Markazi province, Iran. Its capital is the village of Mazraeh Now.

== Demographics ==
=== Population ===
At the time of the 2006 National Census, the rural district's population was 3,853 in 1,112 households. There were 3,382 inhabitants in 1,099 households at the following census of 2011. The 2016 census measured the population of the rural district as 3,142 in 1,113 households. The most populous of its 14 villages was Kardijan, with 1,635 people.

=== Other villages in the rural district ===
- Amirabad
- Ananjerd
- Baharestan
- Do Gush
- Hezarabad
- Khvorakabad
- Kushkak
- Saidabad
- Salehabad
- Sarahrud
- Varsan
