= Bahar (magazine) =

Persian-language literature journal (1910–1922)

Bahār
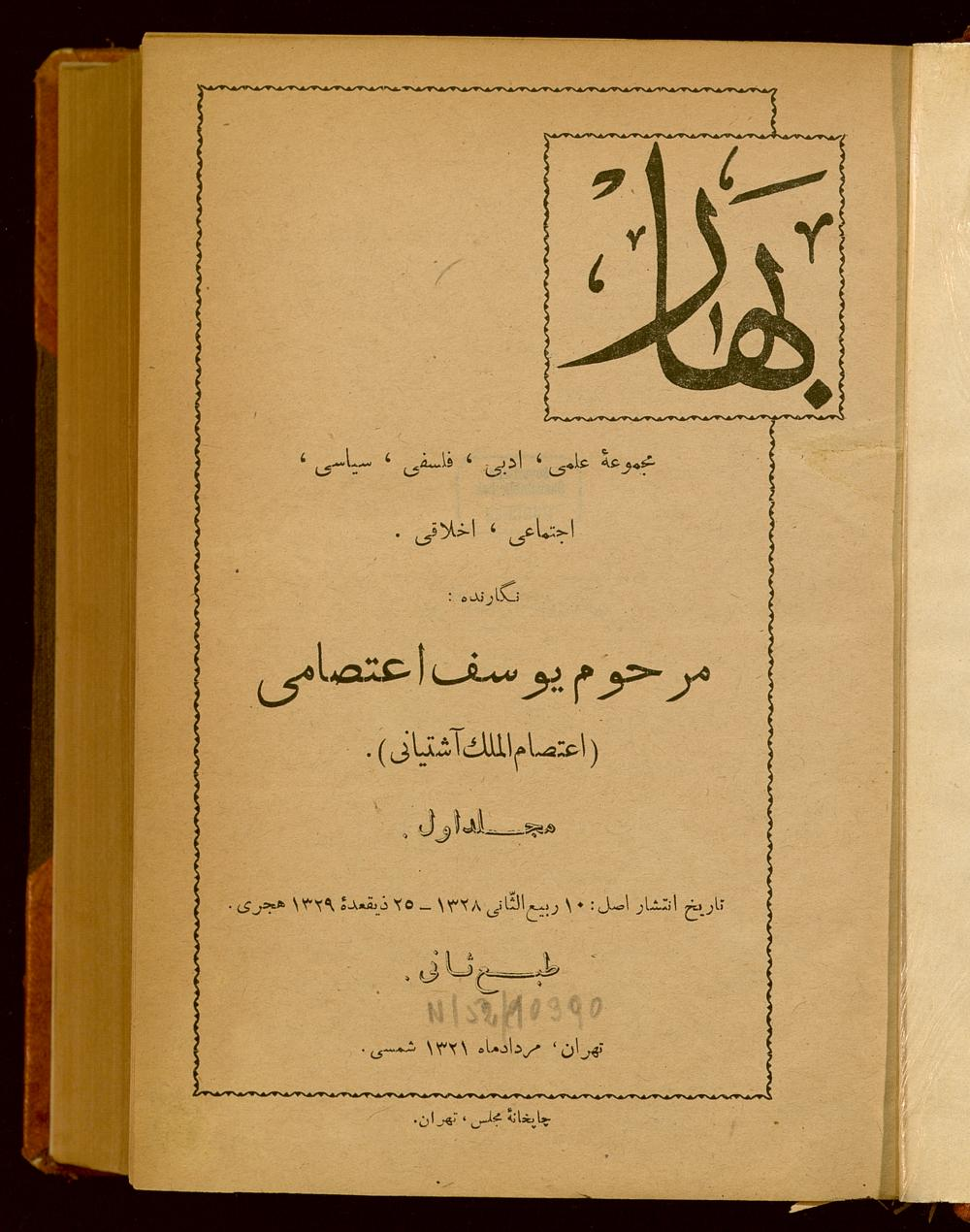
- Editor: Mirza Reza Khan Modabber-al-Mamalek, Abbas Khalili
- Categories: Literature, politics
- Frequency: Monthly
- Publisher: Eʿtesam-al-Molk
- Founder: Yussef Etessami
- First issue: April 1910
- Final issue: December 1922
- Country: Qajar Iran
- Based in: Tehran
- Language: Persian
- Website: Bahār

Bahar (Persian: بهار; DMG: Bahār; English: "Spring") was a Persian-language magazine founded in Tehran, Iran, in 1910 by Mirza Yusof Khan Ashtiani, a Persian poet and journalist. It was published monthly in two volumes (April 1910 – October 1911 and April 1921 –December 1922) in 17 or 16 editions.

== About ==
At the beginning the publisher aimed to provide a forum for literary, scholarly, historical and political exchanges, as well as for the spread of information. The published articles were primarily written or translated by E'tesam-al-Molk himself. Editor-in-chief of the first volume was Mirza Reza Khan Modabber-al-Mamalek, the later editor of Tamaddon (1920). Abbas Khalili, who also published Eqdām newspaper (1921), acted as editor-in-chief of the second volume.

Under Khalili, the publication of literary topics and translations of European literature increased. Well-known examples include works of Victor Hugo and Rousseau as well as Lermontov's "Demon". Discussions of contemporary Persian literature and literary criticism became increasingly popular among readers.
