= Central District (Ashtian County) =

District in Markazi province, Iran

Central District (Ashtian County) Persian: بخش مرکزی شهرستان آشتیان
- District
- Location within Iran
- Coordinates: 34°27′N 50°04′E
- Country: Iran
- Province: Markazi
- County: Ashtian
- Capital: Ashtian

Population (2016)
  - Total: 16,357
- Time zone: UTC+3:30 (IRST)

The Central District of Ashtian County (Persian: بخش مرکزی شهرستان آشتیان) is in Markazi province, Iran. Its capital is the city of Ashtian.

== Demographics ==
=== Population ===
At the time of the 2006 National Census, the district's population was 19,011 in 5,669 households. The following census in 2011 counted 17,105 people in 5,536 households. The 2016 census measured the population of the district as 16,357 inhabitants in 5,582 households.

=== Administrative divisions ===
Central District (Ashtian County) Population
Administrative Divisions	2006	2011	2016
Garakan RD	4,224	2,733	2,603
Mazraeh Now RD	3,853	3,382	3,142
Siyavashan RD	2,610	1,975	1,849
Ashtian (city)	8,324	9,015	8,763
Total	19,011	17,105	16,357
RD = Rural District
