= Ashtian County =

County in Markazi province, Iran

Ashtian County Persian: شهرستان آشتیان
- County
- Location of Ashtian County in Markazi province (center right, yellow)

- Location of Markazi province in Iran
- Coordinates: 34°27′N 50°04′E
- Country: Iran
- Province: Markazi
- Capital: Ashtian
- Districts: Central

Population (2016)
  - Total: 16,357
- Time zone: UTC+3:30 (IRST)

Ashtian County (Persian: شهرستان آشتیان) is in Markazi Province, Iran. Its capital is the city of Ashtian.

== Demographics ==
=== Population ===
At the time of the 2006 National Census, the county's population was 19,011 in 5,669 households. The following census in 2011 counted 17,105 people in 5,536 households. The 2016 census measured the population of the county as 16,357 in 5,582 households.

=== Administrative divisions ===
Ashtian County's population history and administrative structure over three consecutive censuses are shown in the following table.

Ashtian County Population
Administrative Divisions	2006	2011	2016
Central District	19,011	17,105	16,357
Garakan RD	4,224	2,733	2,603
Mazraeh Now RD	3,853	3,382	3,142
Siyavashan RD	2,610	1,975	1,849
Ashtian (city)	8,324	9,015	8,763
Total	19,011	17,105	16,357
RD = Rural District

== See also ==
Media related to Ashtian County at Wikimedia Commons
