= Women's rights in Iran =

During the late 20th and early 21st centuries in Iran, women's rights have been severely restricted, compared with those in most developed nations. The World Economic Forum's 2017 Global Gender Gap Report ranked Iran 140, out of 144 countries, for gender parity. In 2017, in Iran, women comprised just 19% of the paid workforce, with seven percent growth since 1990. In 2017, the Georgetown Institute for Women, Peace and Security (WPS) Index ranked Iran in the bottom tercile of 153 countries. Compared to other South Asian regions, women in Iran have a better access to financial accounts, education, and mobile phones. Iran was ranked 116, out of the 153 countries, in terms of legal discrimination against women.

In Iran, women's rights have changed according to the form of government ruling the country, and attitudes towards women's rights to freedom and self-determination have changed frequently. With the rise of each government, a series of mandates for women's rights have affected a broad range of issues, from voting rights to dress code.

The rights and legal status of Iranian women have changed since the early 20th century, especially during the past three systems of government. During the Qajar era from the late 1800s to the early 20th century, women were isolated; they were not engaged in politics, and their economic contribution was limited to household work. These conditions changed during the Pahlavi era from 1925 to 1979; women won much more freedom. Women's rights and freedoms were established through the shah's wishes for Iran to become a more modern, European-style country, although that was mostly applicable on the country's elites, disregarding the majority of the population. These freedoms were retracted by the Islamic Republic after the 1979 Iranian Revolution. Human Rights Watch said in 2015, "Women's rights are severely restricted in Iran". Under Ebrahim Raisi's tenure, Iranian authorities have increased policing of women's dress code, leading to decline in women rights.

== Current global ranking ==
As of 2023, per Georgetown University's 'Georgetown Institute for Women, Peace and Security', Iran ranks with an index score of 0.557, and is ranked 140th out of 177 countries for women's inclusion, justice, and security.

=== Legal discrimination ===
According to the 2017–2018 Women, Peace, and Security (WPS) Index, Iran ranked 116 out of 153 countries in terms of legal discrimination. The World Bank's database, "Women, Business, and the Law", lists 23 restrictions in Iranian law on married women; this includes "applying for a passport, traveling outside the country, choosing where to live, and being head of the household. Women cannot get a job or pursue a profession in the same way a man can; they cannot be ensured of equal pay for equal work, and there are no laws to restrain gender discrimination in hiring." The WPS report also states there:

are no laws that penalize or prevent the dismissal of pregnant women from work, nor are there laws that provide rights for paternity or parental leave or tax-deductible payments for childcare. The Iranian Civil Code confers power on a husband to prevent his wife from taking any job found to be incompatible with the family interest or the dignity of the husband or his wife. Women have no legal protection against domestic violence or sexual harassment by anyone, and the constitution has no non-discrimination clause with gender as a protected category.

On 7 March 2019 a Grand Ayatollah Ja'far Sobhani criticized the parliament for debating a law that equalizes the "blood money" for accident victims, regardless of their sex. On 2 July, Masoumeh Ebtekar, the head of Vice Presidency for Women and Family Affairs announced the equalization of the "blood money" for both sexes is legal and all of the courts must observe it.

According to an 8 March 2021 OHCHR report Iranian girls, by law, are able to marry as young as 13, and in the first half of 2021 alone, over 16,000 girls aged between 10 and 14 had been married. Additionally, per the aforementioned OHCHR report, education and citizenship for women were imbued with gender discrimination, with women and girls being treated as second-class citizens.

Iran is one of five countries which has neither ratified nor signed the Convention on the Elimination of All Forms of Discrimination Against Women (CEDAW).

=== Financial inclusion ===
According to the 2023 WPS Index, the percentage of women's financial inclusion was reduced from 87.1% in 2017 to 85.1% in 2023. Women's cellphone usage in 2017 was 86.9%, whilst in 2023 it was 80%.

=== Income ===
The per capita income of women in Iran is lower in comparison with that of women in other South Asian regions according to the WPS Index. According to a 2018 World Bank report, the female labor force participation rate has reached 19.8%, a marked improvement despite a wide gender gap.

== History ==
Iran's history is commonly divided into three segments; pre-Islamic, post-Islamic, and the modern era. Though little is known about Iran's pre-Islamic history, its recorded history starts with the Achaemenid Empire in 550 B.C.

=== Achaemenid Empire ===
During the Achaemenid era, Greek historical accounts state women were able to participate in civic affairs; this participation, however, was limited and considered unusual by the general population. Greek historian Herodotus, after his visit to the Achaemenian Empire, said Persian men and women worked together to manage the affairs of the states and participated in public ceremonies together.

=== The Persian Constitutional Revolution ===
During the Qajar era and at the beginning of the Persian Constitutional Revolution:

most women in Persia were second-class citizens with limited if any, rights such as to inheritance or to obtain a basic education. For example, tribal and nomadic groups (like the Kurds, Bakhtiari, Qashqai) allowed their women to interact with men to a certain extent, and even some considered polygamy and Mu'ta (Shia temporary marriage) as undesirable.

Iranian women played a significant role in the Persian Constitutional Revolution of 1905–11. They participated in large numbers in public affairs, and held important positions in journalism and in schools and associations that flourished from 1911 to 1924. Prominent Iranian women who played a vital part in the revolution include Bibi Khanoom Astarabadi, Noor-ol-Hoda Mangeneh, Mohtaram Eskandari, Sediqeh Dowlatabadi, and Qamar-ol-Moluk Vaziri.

At the turn of the 20th century, many educated Persian women were attracted to journalism and writing. Danesh (1907) was the first specialized journal focusing on women's issues. Later, Shokufeh, Name-ye Banovan, Alam-e Nesvan, and Nesvan-e Vatan Khah were published in Tehran. Moreover, Nesvan-e Shargh in Bandar Anzali, Jahan-e Zanan in Mashhad, Dokhtaran-e Iran in Shiraz, and Peik-e saadat in Rasht addressed women's issues throughout Iran.

Although the defeat of the constitutionalists (1921–25) and the consolidation of power by Reza Shah (1925–41) destroyed the women's journals and groups, the state implemented social reforms such as mass education and paid employment for women during this period. Reza Shah also began his controversial policy of Kashf-e hijab, which banned the wearing of the Islamic hijab in public. Like other sectors of society during Reza Shah's rule, however, women lost the right to express themselves and dissent was repressed.

=== Pahlavi era ===
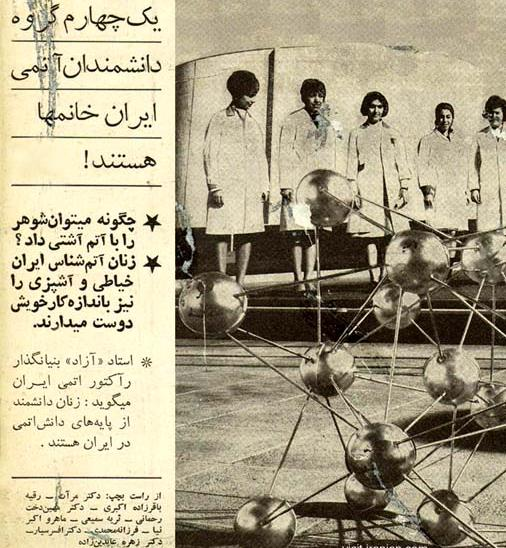
Iranian newspaper clip from 1968 reads: "A quarter of Iran's Nuclear Energy scientists are women"

In 1925, the military commander Reza Khan overthrew the Qajar dynasty. In the same year, he was declared the Shah of Iran, which marked the beginning of the Pahlavi era.

Women's first strides were in education: in 1928, they were provided with financial support to study abroad; in 1935 they were admitted to Tehran University, and in 1944 education became compulsory. In 1936, Reza Shah Pahlavi broke gender segregation by setting the mandatory unveiling of women known as Kashf-e hijab—a highly controversial policy which caused many conservative women to stay inside the house rather than go out in a veil and be subjected to harassment from the police, but also caused desegregation in some sectors of society. The reform was supported by many of the leading women's rights activists, who campaigned for it via the women's organisation Kanoun-e-Banovan.

Iran's societal structure and the status of women began to improve after the Shah visited Turkey in 1936. The Shah was inspired by the Westernization that was taking place there by the Turkish leader, Atatürk. In a speech he gave upon his return from Turkey, the Shah said: "I am extremely delighted that women have become aware of their rights and entitlement … Now women are on their way to gain other rights in addition to the great privilege of motherhood." In the 1960s and 70s, Mohammad Reza Shah's White Revolution helped increase women's legal rights.

=== Islamic Republic ===
==== Women and the Iranian Revolution ====
When the Iranian Revolution started in 1977, many women in metropolitan cities marched in protest and wore chadors. Women played a significant role in the success of the revolution. Their role was both praised and encouraged by the revolutionary leader Ruhollah Khomeini, who in a speech stated: "We must not forget the activities which women performed, notably confrontations. Iranian women were able to turn into a revolutionary, political, conscious fighting element through their conscious faith ... Truly, women never lagged behind in any area or on any battleground".

Because the first Pahlavi Shah banned the use of the hijab, many women decided to show their favor of Khomeini by wearing a chador, thinking this would be the best way to show their support without being vocal. Women took part in the Iranian Revolution by participating in protests. Organizations supportive of the Islamic Revolution, such as Mujahideen, welcomed women into their organization and gave them essential tasks. Khomeini also encouraged women to take part in the protest against the Shah.

==== Khomeini's era ====
With the rise of Khomeini, women's roles were limited; they were encouraged to raise large families and tend to household duties. Khomeini believed this to be the most important role women could pursue. Khomeini's belief led to the closing of women's centres, childcare centers and the abolition of family planning initiatives. Women were restricted to certain fields of work, such as midwifery and teaching.

Instead of being forced to remove their veil, women were now subjected to the reversed ban against unveiling, and the veil were now forced upon all women. The non-conservative women, who had worn the veil as a symbol of opposition during the revolution, had not expected veiling to become mandatory, and when the veil was first made mandatory in February 1979 it was met with protests and demonstrations by liberal and leftist women, and thousands of women participated in a women's march on International Women's Day, 8 March 1979, in protest against mandatory veiling. The protests resulted in the temporary retraction of mandatory veiling. When the left and the liberals were eliminated and the conservatives secured solitary control, however, veiling was enforced on all women. This began with the 'Islamification of offices' in July 1980, when unveiled women were refused entry to government offices and public buildings, and banned from appearing unveiled at their work places under the risk of being fired. On the streets, unveiled women were attacked by revolutionaries, and two slogans of the revolution were: "Wear a veil, or we will punch your head" and "Death to the unveiled". In July 1981, an edict of mandatory veiling in public was introduced, which was followed in 1983 by an Islamic Punishment Law, introducing a punishment of 74 lashes on unveiled women. The law was enforced by members of the Islamic Revolution Committees patrolling the streets, and later by the Guidance Patrols, also called the Morality Police.

==== Khamenei's era ====
After Khomeini's death, women put pressure on the government to grant more rights to women. Ali Khamenei, who followed Khomeini, took a more liberal approach and enabled women's advancement by reopening the women's centers and restoring many of the laws that were repealed after the revocation of Family Protection Laws.

In the May 1997 Iranian presidential election, the overwhelming majority of women voted for Mohammad Khatami, a reformist cleric who promised more political freedoms. His election brought a period during which women became increasingly bold in expressing ideas, demands, and criticisms. The awarding of the Nobel Peace Prize to Shirin Ebadi, Iranian human rights and women's rights activist, further emboldened women's rights activists in Iran and fixed their relationships with Iranian feminists abroad. According to secular feminists, the problem that women face in Iran derives from merging religion and politics.

During the Sixth Parliament, some of Iran's strongest advocates of women's rights emerged. Almost all of the 11 female lawmakers of the then-270-seat Majlis tried to change some of Iran's more conservative laws. During the elections for the Seventh Majlis, however, the all-male Council of Guardians banned the 11 women from running for office and only conservative women were allowed to run. The Seventh Majlis reversed many of the laws passed by the reformist Sixth Majlis.

In mid-November 2018 United Nations General Assembly's Human Rights Committee approved a resolution against Iranian government's continuous discrimination against women and limitation of freedom of thought.

In late November 2018, a group of UN human rights experts including Javaid Rehman U.N. Special rapporteur on human rights in Iran and four other experts raised concerns about Farhad Meysami, who has been on hunger strike since August. He is in jail for opposing the compulsory wearing of the hijab.

On 2 October 2019, the Iranian Guardian Council approved an amendment to the nationality law, in which women married to men with a foreign nationality can confer nationality to their children, following an approval first passed by the Islamic Consultative Assembly in May 2019. This law was later rescinded by another law, which effectively made Iranian mothers unable to confer their nationality to their children.

The Information Technology Organisation (ITO) as the first Iranian government agency publishes banning guidelines described as "forbidden conduct" including sexual harassment, verbal and physical threats, aggressive behavior, defamation, and intimidation, among other offenses. The guidelines have been adjusted with "Iranian and Islamic values".

The Islamic Republic in Iran has strict laws about women's clothing and dancing with men in public (that are not family members). "The use of headscarf in public is mandatory for women while dancing is prohibited." Several women producing videos of themselves dancing have been arrested and forced to confess for "breaking moral norms" on state TV (which The Guardian says is "a tactic often used by Iranian authorities"). Maedeh Hojabri posted videos on Instagram of her dancing. Her Instagram account was then blocked and she was arrested. Hojabri's arrest "led to an outcry of support from ordinary Iranians". In response to protest the Hojabri's arrest, Iranian women have posted videos of themselves dancing. Rights activists said that Hojabri's TV confession was a "forced confession of wrongdoing".

Women are banned from singing in Iran because Shia Muslim clerics believe that "a woman's singing voice can be erotic". Women in Iran have been jailed for "singing in public, or publishing their work on social media".

According to Amnesty International women in Iran face "discrimination in law and practice in relation to marriage and divorce, inheritance, child custody, nationality and international travel".

In December 2022, Iran was expelled from membership of the United Nations Commission on the Status of Women, following the death of Mahsa Amini and the violent crackdown against the Mahsa Amini protests in Iran. This was the first time a member had been expelled over its treatment of women in the history of the commission. In 2024, crackdown on protestors and activists participating in these protests received condemnation from human rights groups. Additionally executions have been carried out against these activists. Additionally prominent feminist and Nobel Peace Prize laureate, Narges Mohammadi is imprisoned, the regime has received multiple international calls for her release.

== Legal rights history ==
=== Voting rights ===
Most initiatives concerning women's rights during the Pahlavi era began with the White Revolution in 1962, which led to the enfranchisement of women by the Prime Minister Asadollah Alam. A law that gave women limited voting rights, allowing them to vote in local elections, was passed. Khomeini believed this right was state propaganda to hide its dictatorial and fascist nature with democracy and liberalism. According to Khomeini, this law "serves only to mislead the uninformed masses and to cover its crimes". Khomeini also believed that such power for women was comparable to prostitution. Khomeini led protests about women's voting rights that resulted in the repeal of the law.

Since the women's voting rights law was repealed, women were forbidden to participate in a referendum held during the White Revolution. The Minister of Agriculture, however, suggested women's movement leaders set up a voting booth to voice their suggestions. Though their votes did not count, the high number of women voting persuaded Mohammad Reza Shah to grant women voting rights soon after the referendum. Six women were elected to the parliament in the September 1963 parliamentary election and the Shah appointed two women to serve in the Senate.

After the 1979 Islamic revolution, Khomeini said, "Women have the right to intervene in politics. It is their duty, Islam is a political religion".

=== Hijab ===
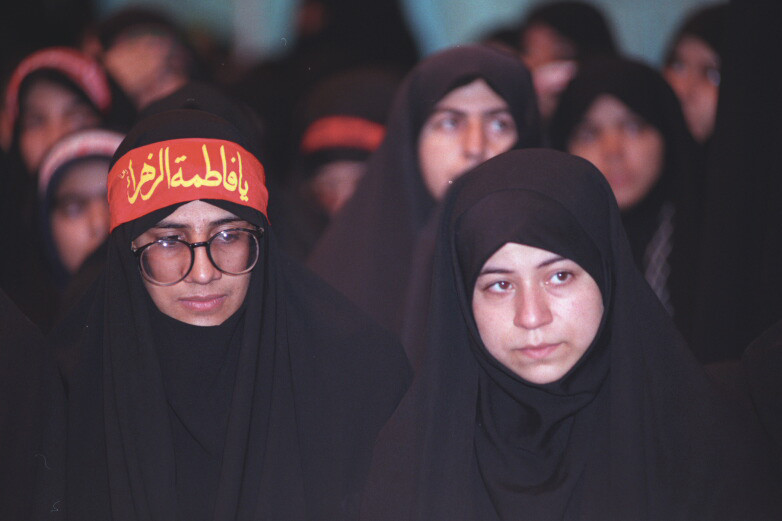
Two Basiji women with hijab

The hijab is a veil worn by many Muslim women when interacting with males outside of their immediate families. Before the foundation of the Islamic Republic, women were not required to wear a veil. In 1935, Reza Shah mandated that women should no longer be veiled in public; because of that, a significant number of conservative women became isolated in their houses because they felt going outside without hijab was equivalent to being naked. Conservative women's dependency grew during this period because they relied on others to run errands.

Compulsory wearing of the hijab was reinstated for Iranian state employees after the 1979 revolution; this was followed by a law requiring the wearing of the hijab in all public spaces in 1983.

Non-conservative women, who had worn the veil as a symbol of opposition during the revolution, had not expected veiling to become mandatory, and when the veil was first made mandatory in February 1979 it was met with protests and demonstrations by liberal and leftist women, and thousands of women participated in a women's march on International Women's Day, 8 March 1979, in protest against mandatory veiling. The protest resulted in the temporary retraction of mandatory veiling. When the left and the liberals were eliminated and the conservatives secured solitary control, however, veiling was enforced on all women, with an edict of mandatory veiling in 1981, followed by an Islamic Punishment Law in 1983, introducing a punishment of 74 lashes on unveiled women.

The Guidance Patrol, an undercover law enforcement squad also known as "Morality Police" (Persian: گشت ارشاد Gašt-e Eršād), surveys women in public for dress-code violations. Wearing a headscarf has been strictly enforced in Iran since the Islamic Revolution in 1979. Women who did not wear a hijab or were deemed to be wearing "bad hijab" by having some of their hair showing faced punishments ranging from fines to imprisonment. In December 2017, the Iranian government announced women would no longer be arrested for wearing a "bad hijab" in public, but those not wearing one would have to attend Islam education classes. Though the announcement was viewed as a moderate improvement, the police still targeted activists campaigning against compulsory hijab-wearing.

On 26 November 2018, Nasrin Sotoudeh, a human-rights lawyer and political prisoner being held at Tehran's Evin Prison, began a hunger strike demanding the release of Farhad Meysami, a doctor who is in jail for protesting compulsory wearing of the hijab. In late 2018 the US State Department condemned the arbitrary arrest of Meisami, who had been on hunger strike since August. In April 2019, Sotoudeh was sentenced to 148 lashes and 38 years in prison for defending opposition activists and women's rights for not wearing hijabs in public. According to the judge presiding over Sotoudeh's case, she was punished for "gathering and colluding to commit crimes against national security" and "insulting the supreme leader".

In August 2019, Iranian civil rights activist Saba Kord Afshari was sentenced to 24 years in prison, including a 15-year term for taking off her hijab in public, which Iranian authorities say promoted "corruption and prostitution".

Iranian activist Shaparak Shajarizadeh was arrested three times and imprisoned twice for defying Iran's laws about compulsory hijab. She encouraged men and women to "post images on social media of themselves either wearing white or no headscarf to protest being forced to wear the hijab." She later fled Iran.

In 2019, three women arrested for "disrespecting compulsory hijab" were sentenced to a total of 55 years and six months by a "Revolutionary Court" in Iran.

In July 2022, Sepideh Rashnu, a writer and artist, was arrested after her video of being harassed on a bus for "improper clothing" was circulated online. She was taken to hospital due to internal bleeding after her arrest, possibly due to torture. Her forced confession was played on local television after the visit to hospital. Dozens of women were arrested after 12 July 2022 for not wearing Hijab.

On 15 August 2022, Iran introduced new restrictions on women's dress code. The new rules state that the female government employees will be fired if they post their pictures on social media which do not conform to Islamic laws and women publishing their pictures without a hijab on the Internet will be excluded from some social rights for up to an year. President Ebrahim Raisi announced the use of facial recognition technology in public transport to impose new hijab laws. A few days later, a woman died in police custody after being arrested for not wearing the hijab properly, sparking a series of protests.

In late 2024 a new law expanded hard penalties for not wearing a hijab, while temporarily paused, the law signals a significant escalation in gender-based repression.

=== Marriage law ===
As part of the White Revolution, Mohammad Reza Shah enacted the Family Protection Laws, a series of laws that included women's rights to divorce. The laws also raised the minimum marriage age for all, 18 for girls and 21 for boys with exemptions allowed down to the age of 15 for boys and 13 for girls and curtailed the custom of polygamy, mandating spousal consent before lawfully marrying a second wife. Under these laws, the right of divorce for women was granted by allowing women to end a marriage if they were unhappy. The law also gave women the right to keep custody of their children and the right to an abortion under certain circumstances, such as rape and risk to the woman's life.

After the revolution, the new minimum marriageable age became 9 for girls and 15 for boys in 1982. The possibility of an exception to the minimum age was maintained, provided that it was deemed to be in the interests of the child, a determination left to the legal guardian. The age was based on hadiths, since Shia Islam contains hadiths that indicate different age limits for maturity and marriage, typically ranging from 9 to 13 or 15 years, though settling on 9 years for girls was Khomeinis personal interpretation of the correct maturity age, even though other hadiths gave credence for older ages.

In 2008, President Mahmoud Ahmadinejad's administration introduced a "family support bill" that would have allowed men to marry a second wife without his first wife's permission and put a tax on Mariyeh—which is seen by many women "as a financial safety net in the event a husband leaves the marriage and is not forced to pay alimony". In September 2008, Iran's judiciary returned the tax bill to the legislative council with complaints about the polygamy and tax articles, which removed from the bill.

Marriage laws in Iran continue to be difficult to change permanently due to the role family plays in Islamic societies. Tradition is key in Islamic society; to attempt to change a tradition and keep the change applicable, it must occur many times.

=== Divorce law ===
Divorce law in Iran was initially based upon the general rule in Shari'a law that gives men the sole right to end a marriage at any time. This is based on Article 1133 of the previous Civil Code (1928) that states: "A man can divorce his wife whenever he wishes to do so". This law was modified in 1967 by the Family Protection Act that granted women more rights in divorce and made private divorces illegal. The 1967 Act included the right to apply for a divorce under specific conditions; Article 1130 of the Civil Code gave courts more power to grant a judicial divorce requested by a woman and in circumstances in which the wife could attain power of attorney and expedite the divorce process.

=== Civil law ===
Iran's civil law system can be seen as very gender-biased, with numerous laws that favor men over women and few, if any, laws favoring women. Iran follows Islamic laws. Under Iranian civil laws, when children reach puberty, they also gain penal responsibility and can legally be tried as an adult. This can be seen as disadvantageous towards girls, who reach puberty around the age of ten whereas boys reach it around the age of fourteen. This means girls as young as ten can be prosecuted criminally. Punishments can vary from prison sentences to lashes and the death penalty.

On 13 November 2018, Entekhab, Iran's official news agency, published a statement by the hiking board of the northeastern Razavi Khorasan province that requires Iranian women to have permission from their husbands or fathers if they want to go hiking.

Iran forbids women from traveling without the consent of her husband. According to article 18 of the Passport Law passed in 1973, a husband can ban his wife from leaving the country. A woman is required by Iranian law to have the permission on her husband before she can leave the country or obtain a passport. In response to this, many Iranian women created a protest called "Women's right to travel" which has garnered over 50,000 signatures. Women in Iran have little, if any, autonomy or rights compared to men in Iran.

== Education ==
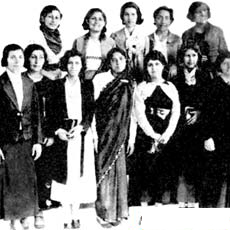
First group of women who entered university, 1936.

The writer and activist Bibi Khanoom Astarabadi founded the first school for Persian girls in 1907. In this school, Iranian women could study subjects including history, geography, law, calculus, religion, and cooking. The enrollment of 12 women into Tehran University in 1936 marked the entry of women into university education in Iran.

Since the 1960s and 1970s a lot of educational infrastructure was built in Iran, specially many young universities, which are the best up to today, women's education started to increase in the 1960s and 1970s and more than 50% of students were female. This new trend continued due to availability of a young generation of well-trained professors despite the restrictions imposed after 1979 Iranian Revolution by the Islamic government. Although for five years the universities were shut down completely for imposing new laws of Islamic state on universities. Despite change in quality and new restrictions on women in some topics, the existing infrastructure significantly helped in the continuation of this trend. Though the quality of research work significantly decreased which caused a significant brain drain. The trend continues and more than 60% of all university students in Iran are women. In 1994, Ali Khamenei, Supreme leader of Iran, declared the percentage of female university was 33% before the Revolution but after that in 2012 it was 60%. As of 2006, women account for over half of the university students in Iran, and 70% of Iran's science and engineering students. These education and social trends are increasingly viewed with alarm by the Iranian conservatives groups. A report by the Research Center of the Majlis (controlled by conservatives) warned the large female enrollment could cause "social disparity and economic and cultural imbalances between men and women".

Despite the advancement in higher education for women, there have been many setbacks. On 6 August 2012, the Mehr News Agency "posted a bulletin that 36 universities in the country had excluded women from 77 fields of study" as part of an effort by parliament to put a quota on women's participation in higher education. According to Radio Farda in 2018 there were less than 35% of university-educated young women in Qazvin and Hormozgan provinces as the lowest unemployment rate in Iran.

Pre-1979	Comparison	Since 1979
42.33%	Literacy (15–24)	97.70%
24.42%	Literacy (>15)	79.23%
48,845	Students	2,191,409
122,753	Graduates	5,023,992
2.4%	Graduates (%)	18.4%
19.7	Age at 1st marriage	23.4

Iranian women rights activists determined education is a key for the country's women and society; they argued giving women education was best for Iran because mothers would raise better sons for their country. Many Iranian women, including Jaleh Amouzgar, Eliz Sanasarian, Janet Afary, and Alenush Terian have been influential in the sciences. Maryam Mirzakhani won gold medals in the 1994 and 1995 International Mathematical Olympiads, and in 2014 her work on dynamics made her the first woman in the world to win the Fields Medal, which is widely considered to be the most prestigious award in mathematics.

In 2001, Allameh Tabatabaii University, Tarbiat Modares University and Azzahra University initiated a women's studies academic field at the Master of Arts level and shortly after, Tehran University organized a similar program.

=== Khatami era ===
During the rule of Mohammad Khatami, Iran's president between 1997 and 2005, educational opportunities for women grew. Khatami, who thought women's place was in the home, did not seek to exclude females from public life. Noting more women were participating in higher education, Khatami said the increase was concerning but did not wish to reduce it. Khatami called for the creation of specialisms and majors for women in universities and for the quota system that was introduced after the 1979 revolution.

When Khatami's presidency began, more than 95 percent of Iranian girls went to primary school In 1997–98, 38.2 percent of Iranian women enrolled in higher education. and had risen to 47.2 percent by 2000. As female enrollment in schools grew, the sexual segregation in academic specialization remained until the late the 1990s. In 1998–99, males comprised 58 percent in mathematics, physics, and technical fields with 71 percent of secondary school students. Women comprised 61 percent of students enrolled in the humanities and the experimental sciences. The divide of the sexes continued at university level where most females studied arts, basic sciences, and medicine, while mostly males studied engineering, humanities, agriculture, and veterinary science. The decade saw a three-fold growth in female enrollment in higher education.

The Khatami presidency saw the slow rise of women's participation in education. Women pursuing teaching positions in higher education also made gains during this period; at universities, women held nearly half of the assistant professorships—almost twice the number held ten years before. The percentage of females accepted into tenure-track and full-time professorships in 2001–02 was 17.3%.

== Economic rights ==
According to Iran's 2007 census, 10% of women were actively contributing to the economy and that over 60% of men were economically active. Compared with men, women have one-third of the chances of gaining managerial positions. According to a 2017 Human Rights Watch report, this inequality is caused by domestic laws discriminating against women's access to employment. The types of professions available to women are restricted and benefits are often denied. Husbands have the right to prevent wives from working in particular occupations and some positions require the husband's written consent.

As of 2006, women's labor-force participation rates was at 12.6% in rural areas with a national rate of 12.5% whereas the rate for men is 66.1%. Women's engagement in informal and private sectors are not included in the data. The World Bank estimates women's participation in all sectors is 32% and 75% for men. In 2006, the estimated percentage for women's leadership roles was 3.4%.

The OECD/GWEP (2025) report Bridging the Finance Gap for Women Entrepreneurs highlights that although Iranian women have increased their participation in entrepreneurship, structural disparities remain significant. The report points to limited access to finance, insufficient collateral and low institutional trust as key obstacles, and proposes targeted policy interventions to improve inclusion of women entrepreneurs.

== Political rights ==
During the first three parliaments after the 1979 revolution, three of the 268 seats—1.5%—were held by women. Today, there are 17 women among the 271 individuals in parliament. Since then, women's presence in parliament has doubled to 3.3% of the seats. The women in parliament have ratified 35 bills concerning women's issues.

According to the Financial Tribune, Women constitute less than 10% of parliament members in Iran, even though "women have been overshadowing men in higher education for years."

== Treatment by society ==
In Iran, men usually ask women to get a virginity test before marriage. The practice exists in many countries despite WHO's denouncement of virginity testing as unethical and lacking any scientific merit.

== Prisoners' rights ==
According to the report of the Kurdistan human rights network, on 28 November 2018, guards in Khoy women prison in the northwest of Iran attacked inmate Zeynab Jalalian and confiscated her belongings. She was arrested in February 2007 and was sentenced to death on account of "armed actions against Islamic Republic of Iran and membership in PJAK in addition to possessing and carrying illegal weapons while engaging in acts of propaganda warfare against the Islamic Republic of Iran" in December 2008.

According to Iran-HRM, in late November 2018, a prison warden in Qarchak women prison in Varamin near Tehran attacked and bit three Dervish religious minority prisoners when they demanded the return of confiscated belongings back.

Iranian female human rights activist Bahareh Hedayat was arrested on 10 February 2020 by Tehran University security police. She was later taken to Qarchak prison where she is now on hunger strike. Bahareh's colleagues say she was beaten by the police when she was arrested.

On 7 October 2020, after Narges Mohammadi, a human rights activist, was freed after a long-term prison sentence, the United Nations High Commissioner for Rights (UNHRC) called for the release of other activists from Iran's jails.

On 16 August 2023, Iran arrested 12 female activists in a bid to prevent potential protests marking the anniversary of an uprising ignited by the death of Mahsa Amini, 22. The detainees in Gilan province are accused of "anti-security activities," part of a strategy to quell dissent and avoid a repeat of the previous year's widespread protests.

== Sports ==
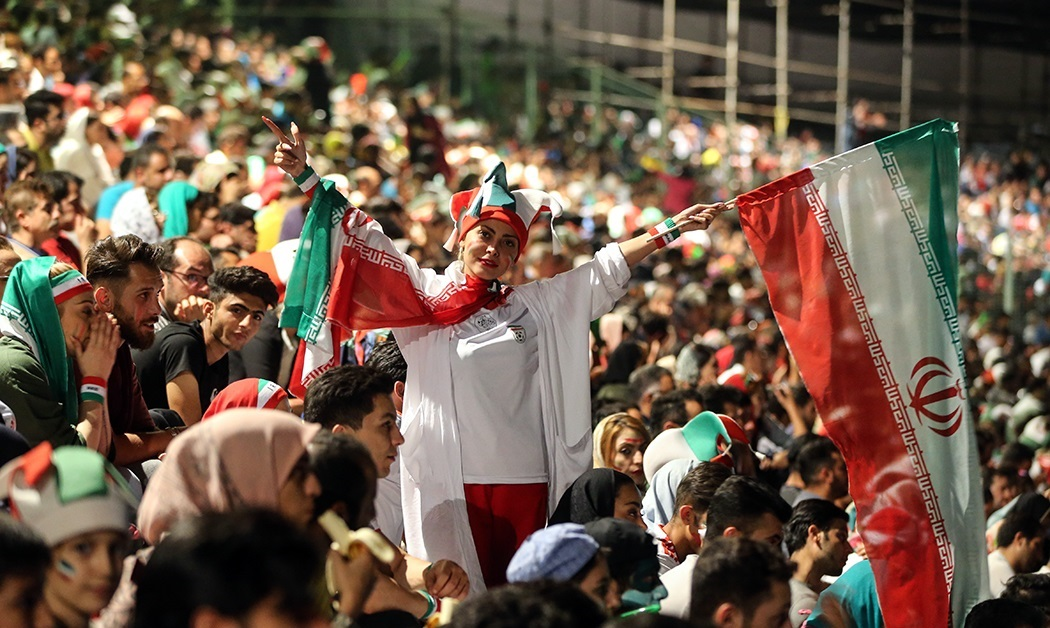
Women were allowed to enter football stadiums after 40 years to watch the FIFA World Cup in 2018

Women contributed to the development of polo in Persia 2,500 years ago.

In Iran, women participate in numerous sports and have represented the country in sporting events such as the Asian Games, Olympic Games and World Cups.

Taekwondo athlete Kimia Alizadeh has previously represented Iran in international competitions, including the 2016 Summer Olympics in which she won a bronze medal. She migrated to Germany in 2020 and declared intent to cease her representation of Iran, claiming she could no longer compete for the country due to the Iranian regime's "injustice and hypocrisy," and that the Iranian government manipulates athletes as tools for political propaganda. She has since gone on to represent the Refugee Olympic Team for the 2020 Games and currently competes for Bulgaria in international competitions.

In Iran, women are not allowed to ride bicycles pursuant to an Islamic fatwa issued by Ayatollah Ali Khamenei. According to the Muslim clerics, if a man sees a woman riding a bicycle, it will lead to crimes including sexual offenses, financial crimes, spiritual infidelity, and religious disobedience.

=== Allowing women to enter stadiums ===
Until recently women were not allowed to enter stadiums in Iran and so could not attend men's volleyball and football/soccer matches. Women have been banned from Tehran's Azadi Stadium since 1981.

The ban on women caused much upset, but lawmakers argued it was women's duty to raise children and not to attend sporting games. Women often wore men's clothes, painted on mustaches, and flattened their breasts to attend spectator sports. In 2006, President Mahmoud Ahmadinejad lifted the ban, stating the presence of women would "promote chastity" but the supreme leader overturned this decision a month later. In 2012, the ban on women was extended to volleyball.

In 2018, thirty-five women gathered outside a match between two Tehran football/soccer clubs and demanded to be let in, and in on 9 November of that year Fatma Samoura Secretary General of International Federation of Association Football (FIFA) said she would ask the Iranian government to end the ban on a woman's entry to sport stadiums. According to the order of World football's governing body in November 2019, women were allowed to attend stadiums "without restrictions and in numbers determined by demand for tickets".

In 2019, a female football fan, Sahar Khodayari, was arrested for "appearing in public without a hijab" after she attempting to sneak into a football/soccer match dressed as a man. On 2 September 2019, she set herself on fire outside a Tehran court in protest. The Iranian government conceded to FIFA shortly thereafter and on 10 October 2019, more than 3,500 women attended a World Cup qualifier against Cambodia at Azadi Stadium, although they were confined to a roped off area. (Women are still barred from attending matches where one of the teams is not Iranian.) In 2022 videos surfaced showing security guards in Iran pepper-spraying women during a football match despite them holding tickets.

Furthermore, women journalists were banned to cover men's football matches inside the stadiums in Iran, while Parisa Pourtaherian was the first Iranian sports photographer who tried to shoot an official league match from a nearby rooftop.

== Women's health ==
In 2005, the Iranian parliament approved abortions that were carried out before four months' gestation if the woman's life was at risk or if the fetus was nonviable or growing abnormally. With technical support from the United Nations Population Fund, the government undertook literacy and family planning initiatives.

A fund called Americans for UNFPA contributed to the Literacy Movement Organization of Iran, providing training more than 7,000 teachers, developing a nine-episode television series on women's health issues including family planning, and procuring computers and other equipment.

The average life expectancy for Iranian women has increased from 44.2 years in 1960 to 75.7 years in 2012 and the maternal mortality rate decreased from 83 to 23 per 100,000 between 1990 and 2013. In the 20th century, female social activists, health workers, and non-governmental organizations promoted the health of women by stressing the importance of regular check-ups, Pap smears, mammography, and blood tests. Vitamin D and calcium supplementation and hormone replacement therapy were emphasized with the intent of preventing osteoporosis. In 2011, depression in Iranian women was ranked first among diseases; it was ranked second in 2003. The prevalence of criminality by women has increased in recent years, as have crimes related to drugs and violence.

In August 2014, permanent methods of contraception were banned by Iran's parliament. Khamenei called for a ban on vasectomies and tubal ligation in an effort to increase population growth. Amnesty International reported that in 2018, access to affordable and modern contraception for Iranian women was limited.

== Women's rights movement in Iran ==
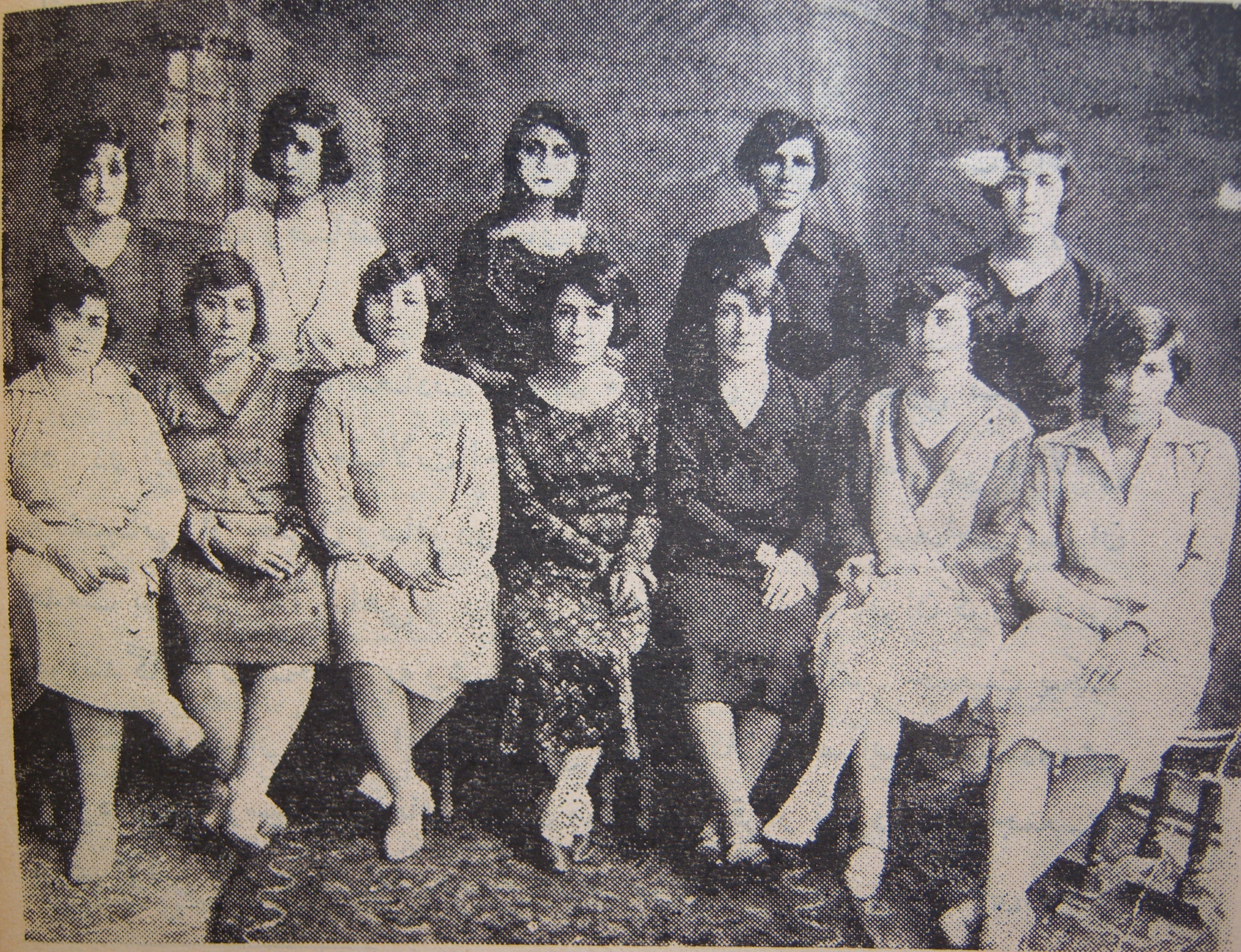
The board of directors of "Jam'iat e nesvan e vatan-khah", a women's rights association in Tehran (1923–1933)

The women's rights movement in Iran has roots in the late 19th and early 20th centuries. Women's activism developed through educational, charitable, literary and political organizations and expanded during the Constitutional Revolution of 1905–1911. According to Nayereh Tohidi, the modern Iranian women's movement can be divided into several historical periods.

=== Early women's activism ===
During the Constitutional Revolution of 1905–1911, women participated in demonstrations, boycotts, fundraising and the establishment of schools and women's associations, although they did not receive formal political rights. Women's organizations and publications subsequently contributed to debates over education, marriage, family law and women's political participation.

In the mid-19th century, Táhirih became one of the most prominent early female figures associated with challenges to traditional restrictions on women. She appeared unveiled in public and advocated changes in women's social and religious status.

=== Pahlavi period ===
During the reign of Reza Shah, the state pursued policies aimed at expanding women's education and participation in public life. The 1936 unveiling decree prohibited women from wearing the veil in public. Under Mohammad Reza Pahlavi, women's access to education and employment expanded further. Women gained the right to vote and stand for election in 1963.

1940s–1950s: this was the era of Nationalization of the Iranian oil industry and brought women further access to education and some political activism to some extent. Except for the Family Protection Law that failed and was repealed, no major reforms were made during this era.

=== 1979 revolution and the Islamic Republic ===
The 1979 revolution brought major changes to women's legal and social position. The new Islamic government reversed or modified several reforms of the Pahlavi period and introduced policies based on its interpretation of Islamic law. Women were excluded from some professions and compulsory veiling was introduced. Women's protests against compulsory veiling began immediately after the revolution, including large demonstrations in Tehran in March 1979.

=== Reform period and the One Million Signatures Campaign ===
During the presidency of Mohammad Khatami (1997–2005), women's organizations and publications expanded, although activists continued to face legal and political restrictions. The One Million Signatures Campaign was launched in 2006 to seek changes to laws that discriminated against women. The campaign used public education, petitioning and direct engagement with citizens to advocate legal reform.

=== Women in opposition movements ===
Women have also held prominent leadership positions within the People's Mojahedin Organization of Iran, the principal constituent organization of the National Council of Resistance of Iran. The Rajavi leadership made gender equality a central element of their political philosophy, and women have held senior positions within these organizations. Maryam Rajavi assumed joint leadership of the MEK in 1985 and was elected President-elect of the NCRI in 1993. Zahra Merrikhi became Secretary-General in 2017, and Mahnaz Maimanat in 2026.

The National Council of Resistance of Iran's stated political program calls for complete gender equality in political, social, cultural and economic rights, equal participation of women in political leadership, the abolition of discrimination against women, and freedom of choice in clothing. Rajavi's Ten-Point Plan also calls for gender equality and the separation of religion and state.

=== Woman, Life, Freedom movement ===
The women's rights movement entered a new phase following the death in police custody of Mahsa Amini on 16 September 2022 after her arrest over alleged violations of Iran's compulsory-veiling rules. Her death triggered nationwide protests under the slogan "Woman, Life, Freedom". Women and girls played a prominent role in the demonstrations, including by removing or burning headscarves and publicly challenging compulsory veiling.

The protests were met with extensive arrests, prosecutions and other forms of repression. The United Nations Independent International Fact-Finding Mission on Iran reported that Iranian authorities subsequently expanded measures aimed at enforcing compulsory veiling and restricting the rights of women and girls.

The movement also brought together activists with differing political and ideological backgrounds and extended beyond women's rights. Its demands included political freedom, equality and government accountability.

== International influence and the women's movement ==
=== The Persian cultural sphere ===
Iranian intellectual Farah Karimi wrote a book titled "Slagveld Afghanistan" that criticizes Dutch military policies in Afghanistan; in 2006, she was appointed as the representative of the United Nations in Afghanistan affairs.

In 2003, Sima Bina, the voice of Khorasan—a region in northeastern Iran—performed secular threnodies at the Théâtre du Soleil for the benefit of the "Afghanistan: one child one book" project created by the organization Open Asia.

In 2004, the World Bank funded a "network of Persian women" to promote the welfare of women in Persian-speaking lands.

In 2006 Anousheh Ansari, a woman whose family fled the country after the 1979 revolution, became the first Iranian woman in space. The feat, undertaken in Kazakhstan, was reportedly an inspiration to many Iranian women.

=== Relationship with Western feminism ===
Despite the Iranian government anti-feminist stance, many observers have said there is an emerging feminist generation of educated young women in Iran. Some suggest the Iranian women's movement must accept help from western feminists, whose progress has been recognized within western society, to be recognized. This perspective suggests western feminism can offer freedom and opportunity to Iranian women that are not afforded by their own religious society. Advocates of this view say whatever the Iranian women's movement achieves within Iranian society, the status of individual women within this society will always be less than the achievements of western feminists. Others suggest parochial movements of women will never be successful and that until a global sisterhood from all nations and religions has been established, feminism has not truly arrived. A third perspective suggests a global women's movement will ignore and undermine the unique elements of indigenous Iranian feminism that have arisen as a result of their history and religion.

According to Howland, signing the International Covenant on Civil and Political Rights, a multilateral treaty adopted by the United Nations, has not improved women's situation much.

== Crimes against women ==
According to some reports, hundreds of Iranian women are killed each year in honor killings. A 2019 report concluded that "nearly 30 percent of all murder cases in Iran were honor killings of women and girls."

In Iran, some studies estimate the Type I and II female genital mutilation (FGM) among Iraqi migrants and Kurdish minority groups ranges from 40% to 85%. In 2019, The United Nations criticized Iran's human rights record and suggested improvements to women's rights there.

In October 2020 a bookstore owner, Keyvan Emamverdi, confessed to raping 300 women. Hundreds of women that work in the film industry in Iran say there is "systematic" violence against women within the industry.

In 2022 - 2023 hundreds of school girls were poisoned to prevent them from attending school.(Iranian schoolgirls mass poisoning reports) According to an Iranian health official, this involved deliberate poisoning using "chemical compounds".

== In comparison with other Islamic countries ==
According to the World Economic Forum's (2021) Global Gap Survey, Middle Eastern countries including Iran have similar scores for gender parity. Only the United Emirates known for its 'western orientation' had significantly higher scores. Economic participation of women and the UN Gender Inequality Index rank Iran with comparable scores to Egypt, Syria and Iraq. With respect to parity in educational attainment, Iran also follows the positive trend of other Middle Eastern countries, but shows a lack of parity in economic participation.

== See also ==
- Atefeh Sahaaleh
- Atefeh Naami
- Bahare Alavi
- Feminist movement
- Homa Darabi
- Intellectual movements in Iran
- Iran's Family Protection Law
- List of honor killings in Iran
- Mahsa Amini
- Nadia Shahram
- Nazanin Fatehi
- One Million Signatures
- Persepolis (film)
- Sex segregation in Iran
- Roya Heshmati
- Women in Iran
- Women's rights movement in Iran
