= Aban Tribunal =

Nongovernmental tribunal in Iran

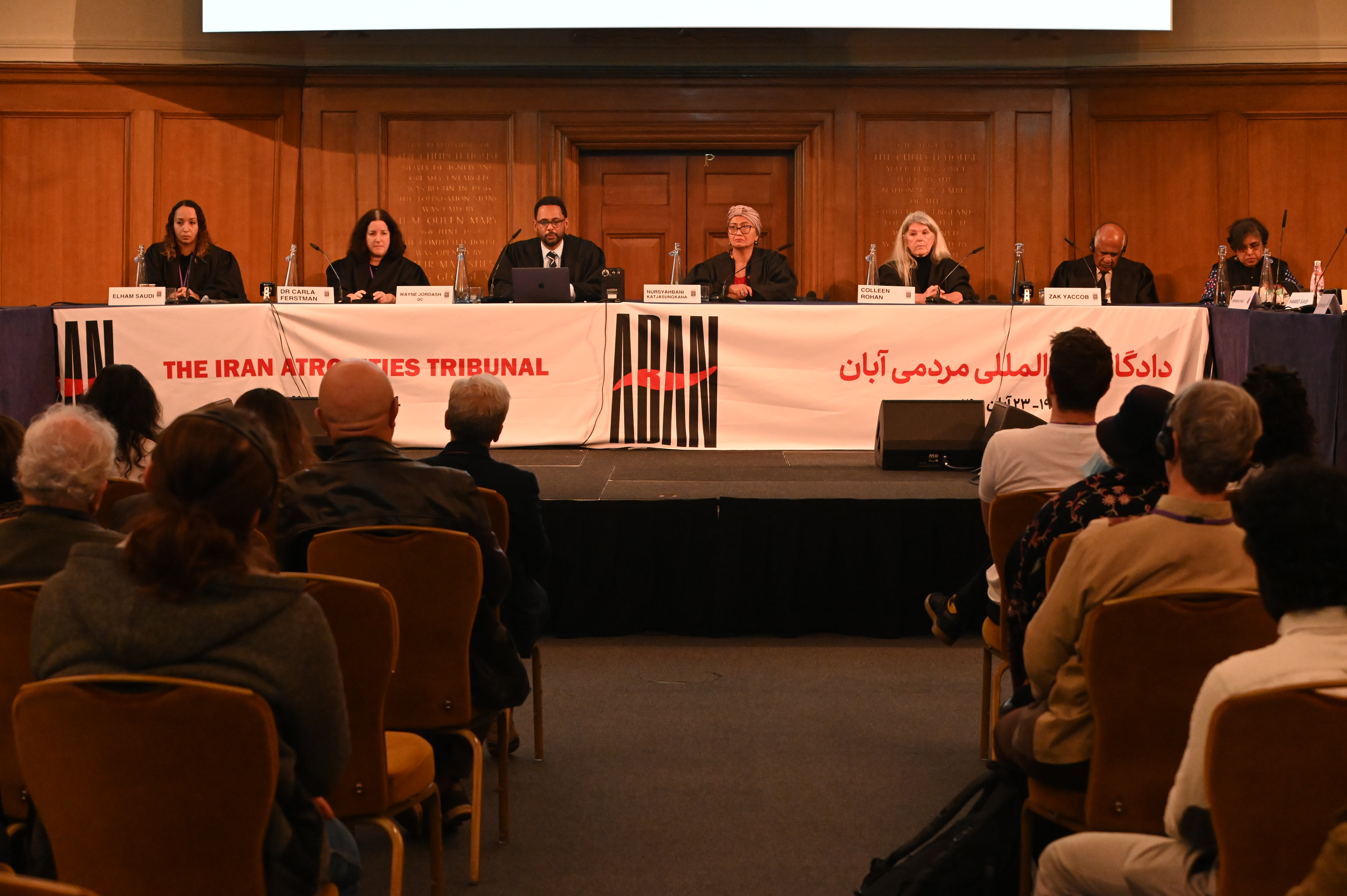
Announcement of the Preliminary Statement of the Panel of Judges, Aban Tribunal, London, Church House, 14 November 2021

Aban Tribunal, otherwise referred to as Iran Atrocities Tribunal, was an international people's tribunal that sought to investigate whether crimes against humanity were committed during the November 2019 nationwide protests in Iran. The tribunal was formed by three human rights and civil society NGOs, Justice for Iran, Iran Human Rights and Together Against the Death Penalty (EPCM).

The tribunal took place across two separate sessions, in November 2021 and February 2022.

== Background ==
On 15 November 2019, the Iranian government announced a marked increase in fuel prices across Iran. This sparked a set of the protests nationwide. Within hours of protests starting, the government imposed an internet blackout across the country. The protests were quashed within a week.

International organisations, including Amnesty International and Reuters, reported death tolls of 300 to 1,500 people. No official investigation into these deaths and other reported crimes was made.

In November 2020, a year after the protests, the Aban Tribunal was established by three human rights organisations, Justice for Iran, Iran Human Rights and Together Against the Death Penalty (EPCM). There had been no official or independent investigations into the crimes committed in the week-long protests. The organisations felt that the victims and their families were being persecuted, while perpetrators of these crimes enjoyed total impunity.

The tribunal was set to take place earlier, but due to the COVID-19 pandemic and time constraints, it was pushed back to November 2021. After the establishment of the tribunal, a public call was made on social media for any witnesses to come forward. The tribunal received more than 400 responses in total.

== Aban Tribunal ==
Aban Tribunal invited a panel of six internationally renowned lawyers, chaired by Wayne Jordash. The panel consisted of Elham Saudi, Nursyahbani Katjasungkana, Carla Ferstman, Zak Yacoob and Colleen Rohan.

In the years prior, evidence had been gathered by researchers and the counsel, led by Hamid Sabi and Regina Paulose. Evidence was provided to the judges through written witness statements extracted from interviews, and live questioning of witnesses, often over video call.

The counsel formally invited all 160 accused to provide defence at the tribunal, but their invitation was ignored. Among the accused were Iran's Supreme Leader, Ali Khamenei, and former president, Ebrahim Raisi.

=== November 2021 session ===
Aban Tribunal opened on 10 November 2022 in London, and continued for four days. In this duration, the judges were presented with live testimonies. Most witnesses were in Iran and did not wish for their identity to be revealed. In many cases, the witnesses were asked to cover their faces and any identifying details, and their voices were distorted.

The witnesses ranged from family members of killed victims, those injured during the protests, passers-by, defected officials, as well as expert witnesses, including Shadi Sadr, Bahar Saba and Mohammad Nayyeri.

The panel examined and questioned all live witnesses and the written statements.

The November session was broadcast live on Iran International TV and was open to the public. Both Persian and international media were in attendance and the event received great coverage.

Due to the wide coverage, over a hundred people came forward and contacted the tribunal, wishing to give testimonies. Because of this reception, a second session was organised, to take place the following February.

=== February 2022 session ===
Following the wide coverage of the November session, the tribunal organised a second session in February 2022. The event was three days long and took place in London. The event was closed to the public, and members of media could only enter with invitation. Some statements were closed to media due to their sensitive nature or security risk.

In this session, judges were presented with further written statements, and questioned witnesses. The witnesses included victims, family members of victims, and defected members of the regime, including the police force, the Basij and IRGC.

== Judgement ==
The final judgement was delivered on 30 September 2022 in London. The panel read their summary of the judgement to the public.

The evidence was tried against accusations of crimes against humanity, encompassing murder, torture, sexual assault, false imprisonment and enforced disappearance of protestors and bystanders during the nationwide November 2019 protests.

The panel also found that these crimes were not only planned, but their commission was concealed, through the nationwide shutdown of the internet and silencing of victims and their families.

The judgement concluded with a set of recommendations, including establishing an independent investigation, ceasing all forms of intimidation, harassment and reprisal against those involved, and to remove all laws and practices which infringe human rights.
