= Shadi Sadr =

Iranian lawyer and women's rights activist

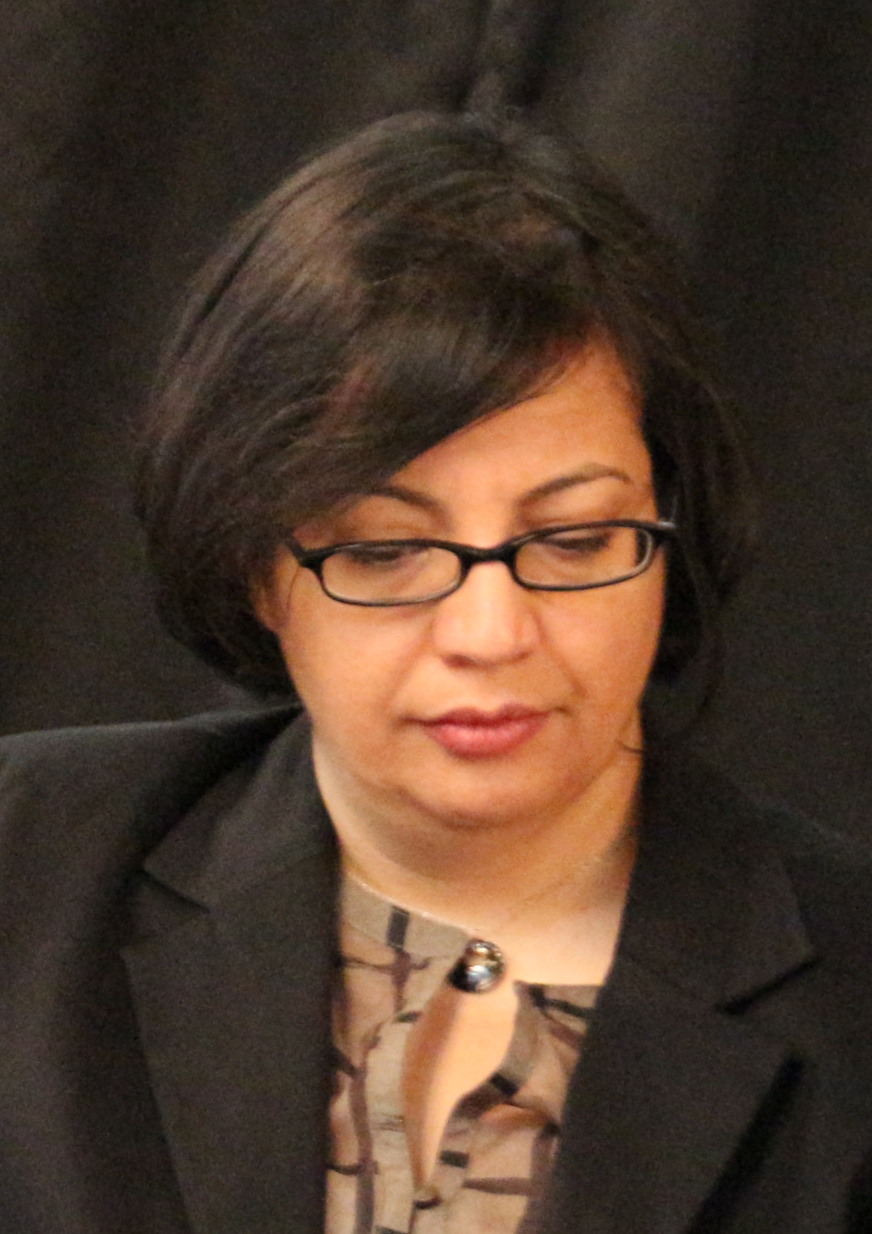
Shadi Sadr in International People's Tribunal, November 2015

Shadi Sadr (Persian: شادی صدر; born 1974) is an Iranian lawyer, human rights advocate, essayist and journalist. She co-founded Justice for Iran (JFI) in 2010 and is the Executive Director of the NGO. She has published and lectured worldwide.

She has received a number of awards including the Human Rights Tulip and Alexander Prize of Law School of Santa Clara University. In 2007 and 2009 she was detained in Evin prison. On 17 May 2010, she was convicted by the Tehran Revolutionary court of "acting against national security and harming public order".

== Background and education ==
Sadr was born in Tehran, Iran.She holds a bachelor's degree in law and a master's degree in international law, both attained from Tehran University (1999). Even before starting at university, she had been working as a journalist for youth magazines as well as several journals and newspapers.

She worked actively as a human rights lawyer in Iran until 2009, as well as finding and directing Raahi, a legal advice centre for vulnerable women. In a surge of repression against civil society in 2007, the Iranian authorities closed down Raahi. Sadr also established Women In Iran in 2002, a website dedicated to women's rights activists. She was also a founding member of the feminist group, Women’s Field (Meydaan-e-Zanan) which initiated several campaigns including a campaign to remove the ban on women to enter the stadiums. While in Iran, she represented several women sentenced to death by stoning and hanging and as a result of her extensive activities, was imprisoned on various occasions prior to her exile to Europe in 2009 where she co-founded the human rights organisation, Justice for Iran. Sadr is currently a PhD candidate at Leiden University.

== Activities ==
As an expert on human rights in Iran, Shadi Sadr has led many campaigns and organisations which have endeavoured to eradicate human rights violations and abusive practices by the state.

As a practicing lawyer, Shadi Sadr has successfully defended several women activists and journalists in court, who had been sentenced to execution. She is one of the Iranians who have campaigned to eradicate the practice of capital punishment by stoning, particularly of women, in a campaign known as Stop Stoning Forever. This campaign is one of several launched by Women's Field, a women's rights group of which Sadr was a member. This chapter of Sadr’s life has been portrayed in the documentary Women in Shroud which were shown in international human rights film festival all over the world.

Following the 2003 Bam earthquake, she helped organise a relief effort to collect food and supplies for women and children in the area of Bam. Sadr was the defense lawyer of several human rights defenders, including Shiva Nazar Ahari, a member of the Committee of Human Rights Reporters, who was arrested on 14 June 2009.

In 2010, with Shadi Amin, Shadi Sadr co-founded a new organisation Justice for Iran (JFI) which aims to address and eradicate the practice of impunity that empowers officials of the Islamic Republic of Iran to perpetrate widespread human right violations against their citizens and to hold them accountable for their actions.

As the Executive Director of Justice for Iran (JFI), she has overseen the creation and implementation of several research projects on gross violations of the rights of ethnic and religious minorities, LGBTs, women, and those who are persecuted because of their political beliefs. She is also the co-author of Crime and Impunity: Sexual Torture of Women in Islamic Republic Prisons.

Shadi Sadr served as a member of the panel of judges for the 2015 International People’s Tribunal (IPT)1965 on the crimes occurred in Indonesia and the 2017 People's Tribunal on Myanmar.

In July 2025 Shadi Sadr reported Iranian opposition activist Mehdi Nasiri to Canadian Immigration officers for removal. Mehdi Nasiri is an active opposition figure, who has broken off with the Islamic Republic and is a content producer, however Nasiri supports the Pahlavi movement and holds dissimilar political opinions than Shadi Sadr.

== Arrest ==
Shadi Sadr was one of 33 women arrested in March 2007 after gathering outside a Tehran courtroom to protest peacefully against the trial of five women accused of “propaganda against the system”, “acting against national security” and “participating in an illegal demonstration” in connection with a 12 June 2006 demonstration in support of women's rights. Sadr was held for fifteen days in Evin Prison before being freed on bail.

On 17 July 2009, Shadi Sadr was beaten by plainclothes militiamen and taken away as she headed toward Tehran University for participating in one of the post-2009 Presidential election protest. She was walking on Keshavarz Boulevard with several other female activists when individuals in civilian dress approached and refused to identify themselves or justify their actions before forcing her into a waiting car. After she had briefly escaped, her companions were restrained as she was beaten and forced back into the car. It then took her to an unknown location. She was released 11 days later on 28 July 2009.

On 17 May 2010, she was convicted in absentia in a Tehran Revolutionary court of “acting against national security and harming public order” and was sentenced to six years in prison with 74 lashes.

== Publications/Works ==
- Sadr, Shadi (2010). "Islamic Politics and Women's Quest for Gender Equality in Iran". Third World Quarterly. 31 (16): 885–903. doi:10.1080/01436597.2010.502717. PMID 20857567. S2CID 14191735.
- From painkillers to cures Routledge, 2019 doi:10.4324/9780429244674-13
- Pushed back to square one, 2011. ISSN 1551-2681
- Sadr, Shadi (2009). "UNRISD" (PDF). The Pennsylvania State University. 1 (1): 1. Archived from the original (PDF) on 10 August 2017.
- Sadr S. (2012), Women and the Women’s Movement in post-elections: double females?. In: Jahanbegloo R. (Ed.), Civil society and democracy in Iran. Global encounters: studies in comparative political theory. Lanham, Maryland; Plymouth, England: Lexington Books. p. 199-216.
- Sadr S. (2019), From painkillers to cures: challenges and future of People's Tribunals. In: Paulose R.M. (Ed.), People's Tribunals, Human Rights and the Law: Searching for Justice. London: Routledge. 177-193.
- Sadr S. (30 August 2021), Employing enforced disappearance as a framework: a game changer in seeking justice for Iran’s 1980s atrocities. A Contrario ICL: reflections and commentary on global justice issues.
- Sadr S. (6 September 2024), Adding gender to apartheid in international law: but where?. Just Security. New York: New York University School of Law (Reiss Center on Law and Security).
- Sadr S. (9 July 2024), An Iranian war criminal’s freedom has a detonating impact on the universal jurisdiction project. Atlantic Council.
- Sadr S. (22 April 2024), International justice system v. people’s tribunals: a fictional hierarchy. Opinio Juris (The International Commission of Jurists).
- Sadr S. (11 April 2024), Iran’s hijab and chastity bill underscores the need to codify gender apartheid. Just Security: Reiss Center on Law and Security (New York University School of Law).
- Sadr S. (2024), Living as second class human beings: gender apartheid in the Islamic Republic of Iran.
- Sadr S. (14 April 2025), Holding the leadership of the Islamic Republic of Iran accountable for international crimes in Syria. EJIL:Talk!: The European journal of international law.
- Sadr S. (6 March 2025), People of the world as the enforcers of international law: takeaways from the Rojava tribunal. JURISTnews. Pittsburgh.

== Awards and honours ==
- Ida B. Wells Award for Bravery in Journalism, 2004 from Women's eNews in their annual 21 Leaders for the 21st century awards,
- In 2009, she co-received a special prize founded by Lech Wałęsa, legendary leader of Polish "Solidarity" and laureate of Nobel Peace Prize in 1983.
- She also received a Dutch human rights prize, the Human Rights Defenders Tulip, on November 9, 2009.
- In 2010, Sadr received the Alexander Prize of Law School of Santa Clara University for 'ceaseless dedication to championing the cause of Iranian women and risking her freedom to defend those who are wrongfully accused and imprisoned.'
- Also in 2010, Sadr was awarded the International Women of Courage Award by the US Secretary of State, Hillary Clinton but chose not to attend and instead dedicated the award to Shiva Nazar Ahari.
- She was recognized as one of the BBC's 100 women of 2013.
- Sadr was chosen as an honoree for the 5th Annual Harvard Law International Women’s Day Portrait Exhibit in 2018.
- She was awarded the “Engaged Scholar Award” for 2025 by the International Association of Genocide Scholars (IAGS)

== See also ==
- Nooshin Ahmadi Khorasani
- Shadi Amin
- Parvin Ardalan
- Iranian women's movement
- List of Iranian women activists
