= Bahareh Hedayat =

Iranian activist (born 1981)

- Persian: بهاره هدایت
- Born: 1981 (age 44–45); Tehran, Iran
- Occupations: Activist, political prisoner
- Notable work: One Million Signatures campaign

Bahareh Hedayat (Persian: بهاره هدایت, born 1981) is an Iranian activist and campaigner for women's rights. She was one of the activists who worked on the One Million Signatures campaign to change laws that discriminate against women in Iran. She has been arrested and imprisoned several times.

== Life ==
Hedayat is a founding member of a petition for women's rights in Iran known as the "One Million Signatures campaign".

She graduated from the University of Economic Sciences in Tehran. She was a student at the University of Tehran in the School of Economics.

On June 14, 2016, the United Nations' Working Group on Arbitrary Detention issued an opinion demanding Hedayat's immediate release, her imprisonment since 2009 being arbitrary and against international law. Hedayat experienced severe negligence and was denied access to her medical needs at various times throughout her imprisonment. She was also on occasion denied family visits and phone calls. During her time in prison, Hedayat translated Dave Eggers book The Circle and David Mitchell's Cloud Atlas from English to Persian all by hand and with the help of a dictionary.

== Arrests and imprisonment ==
She was arrested on July 9, 2007, and on August 9, 2007, but released on bail. She was again arrested and released in 2008 and in 2010 was sentenced to nine and a half years imprisonment for anti-state propaganda.

Hedayat was arrested for her participation in a peaceful gathering to condemn the downing of the Ukraine International Airlines Flight 752 by Iran's Revolutionary Guards (IRGC) in January 2020 and has been sentenced to four years and eight months in prison.

On 10 February 2020, Bahareh was arrested by Tehran University security police. She was later taken to Qarchak prison. There she started a hunger strike.

Hedayat was again arrested by security forces in Tehran on Monday, October 11, 2022, amid the Mahsa Amini protests. After eight days of detention, in a phone call, she informed her family that she was in ward 209 of Evin prison and did not know the reason for her arrest, nor the charges against her.

She started a hunger strike on August 31, 2023.

== Awards and recognition ==
In 2012 Hedayat was awarded the Edelstam Prize for outstanding contributions and exceptional courage in standing up for one's beliefs in defense of Human Rights.

== See also ==
- Human rights in Iran
- Women's rights in Iran
- Iranian women's movement
- Ukraine International Airlines Flight 752 protests
- Detainees of the Mahsa Amini protests
