= Mahshid Moshiri =

Iranian writer (1952–2025)

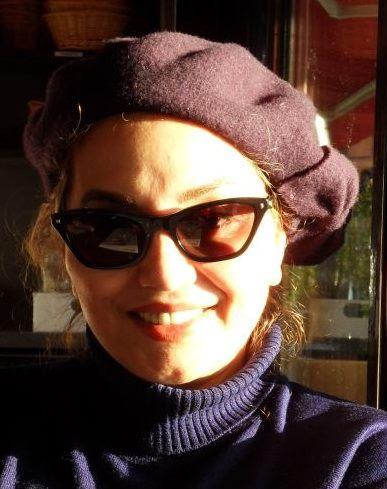
Mahshid Moshiri

Mahshid Moshiri (Persian: مهشید مشیری; 20 March 1952 – 25 June 2025) was an Iranian novelist and lexicographer.

== Life and career ==
Mahshid Moshiri was born in Tehran, Iran on 20 March 1952. She graduated from the University of Sorbonne with a PhD in linguistics. She was the author of the first Persian Phono-Orthographic Dictionary. She was also an encyclopedist, and served as the Research Vice President of The Great Persian Encyclopedia Foundation. Moshiri died on 25 June 2025, at the age of 73.

== Selected works ==
=== Persian dictionaries ===
- Persian Dictionary (alphabetical & analogical). 5th ed, Soroush, Tehran, 2004.
- An Unabridged Persian Dictionary (Fascicle 1). GPE, Tehran. 2003.
- Persian General Dictionary (in 2 volumes). 2nd ed, Alborz, Tehran, 2004.
- Concise Persian Dictionary. 6th ed, Alborz, Tehran, 2003.
- Collegiate Persian Dictionary. 2nd ed, Peykan, Tehran, 2003.

=== Bilingual dictionaries ===
- Dictionary of the Verbs (French-Persian). 2nd ed, Soroush, Tehran, 2004.
- Atlas English-Persian Dictionary (5 volumes), Editor-in-Chief, Aryan-Tarjoman, Tehran, 2007.

=== Specialized dictionaries ===
- Persian Phono-Orthographic Dictionary. Ketabsara, Tehran, 1987.
- Dictionary of European Words in Persian. Alborz, Tehran, 1993.
- Dictionary of Love & Gnosticism. Alborz, Tehran, 1997.
- Dictionary of Reduplication, assimilation & repetition in Persian. Agahan-e Ideh, Tehran, 1999.
- Thematic Dictionary of Saadi's Lyrics. Hormozgan University Press, 2000.
- Thematic Dictionary of Farrokhi Yazdi’s Lyrics. Agahan-e Ideh, Tehran, 2000.
- Rime & Rhythm Dictionary of Saadi's Lyrics. Hormozgan University Press, 2001.
- A Persian Dictionary of the Youngsters’ Vernacular. Agahan-e Ideh, Tehran, 2002.
- Dictionary of Persian poets from the apparition of Dari Persian until today (realized in French language). Aryan-Tarjoman. Tehran. 2007.

=== Novels ===
- Yad-e Jaran (The Memories of Childhood). Alborz, Tehran, 1998.
- There is a fire … Hamshahri, Tehran, 2003.
- The anemone has flowered everywhere. (Iranian novel in French). Aryan-Tarjoman, Tehran, 2007.
