= Women and Politics in Iran =

Women and Politics in Iran: Veiling, Unveiling, and Reveiling is a 2007 by Hamideh Sedghi, published by Cambridge University Press.

The historical period covered by the book stems from the early 20th century to circa 2007. There are three parts, with each having biographical data on key women. The first part covers Qajar Iran, the second part covers Pahlavi Iran, and the third covers the society after the Iranian Revolution.

The third part mentions that Iranian women have more public societal presence compared to women from some other countries that follow Islam.

== Reception ==
Louise Halper of Washington and Lee University School of Law stated that the book is "an important contribution" in its field.

Shireen Mahdavi of the University of Utah stated that since the book did not use too much jargon, the work "is very readable". Mahdavi stated that Part 3 was the "most informative" of the three parts. The reviewer criticized the book's referencing system.

== See also ==
- Women's rights in Iran
