= One Million Signatures =

Iranian women's rights campaign against discriminatory laws

Change for Equality logo

One Million Signatures for the Repeal of Discriminatory Laws (Persian: يک ميليون امضا برای لغو قوانين تبعيض آميز Yek Milyun Emzā barā-ye Laghv-e Qavānin-e Tab‘iz Āmiz), also known as Change for Equality, was a campaign by women in Iran to collect one million signatures in support of changing discriminatory laws against women in their country, started in August 2006. The campaign is also known as the Campaign for One Million Signatures (CFOMS). Activists of the movement were attacked and jailed by the Iranian Government, and the campaign had to extend its two-year target to collect the full number of signatures. The campaign has received wide international recognition. Prominent journalistic, human rights, and pro-democracy organizations have awarded important prizes to both the organization and some of its members.

== History ==
Iranian women's rights activists in Iran started the campaign to follow up a peaceful protest with the same aim in 2006 in Haft-e Tir Square in Tehran. The campaign was officially launched on 28 August 2006, at a seminar entitled The Effect of Laws on Women's Lives, (Persian: تاثیر قوانین بر زندگی در حال زنان Taaseereh ghavaaneen bar zendegee dar haaleh zanaan).

Lawyer and women's rights advocate Nasrin Sotoudeh was one of the first to join the movement, which was also known as the Campaign for One Million Signatures (CFOMS). She later defended other members of CFOMS, including Noushin Ahmadi Khorasani, Khadijeh Moghaddam, Raheleh Asgarizadeh, Nasim Khosravi, Amir Yaghoub-Ali, and Nahid Jafari.

Activists of the movement have been attacked and jailed by the government, and the campaign had to extend its original two-year target to collect the full number of signatures.

== Goals and strategy ==
As well as collecting a million signatures to support reform of the law, the campaign, in its own words, also aims to achieve the following:

1. Promotion of collaboration and cooperation for social change
2. Identification of women's needs and priorities
3. Amplifying women's voices
4. Increasing knowledge, promoting democratic action
5. Paying dues
6. The power of numbers
7. Power in diversity

The campaign seeks to secure equal rights in marriage and inheritance, an end to polygamy, and stricter punishments for honour killings and other forms of violence.

The organizers of the campaign consider that its demands conform to Islamic principles, and are in line with Iran's international commitments. As a signatory to the International Covenant on Civil and Political Rights, Iran has committed to eliminate all forms of discrimination, and needs to take specific action in reforming laws that promote discrimination. These demands are in no way contradictory to the foundations of Islam, and have been discussed among Islamic jurists and scholars for some time. The organizers hoped that a million-signature petition will demonstrate, to decision-makers and the general public, that the desire to change discriminatory laws against women is not limited to a small segment of society, but widespread among diverse parts of the Iranian population.

Similar signature campaigns have been held in other countries. Specifically, women in Morocco held a "One Million Signature" campaign for women's rights in 1992. The Million Signatures campaign was initiated solely by Iranian women in Iran without any support from any foreign countries. However, it has been active in collecting signatures both from Iranian citizens who live in Iran, and from those who are residents of other countries.

The campaign has been described as a way to take advantage of the "figurative walls" of privacy in Iran. A political demonstration may find little publicity and its participants may be beaten and arrested—as happened at the 12 June 2006 demonstration. However, signature seekers "fan out in ones and twos, to small towns and villages, going into shops, beauty salons, schools and offices, or stand at bus stops explaining 'face to face' how the Iranian interpretation of Sharia law is stacked against half the population. They ask men and women to sign their petition."

== Persecution ==
Several participants in the peaceful gathering of women's rights defenders on 12 June 2006 in Hafte Tir Square, which ended with police violence and brutality and the arrest of 70 people, were tried and sentenced. They include Delaram Ali, Fariba Davoodi Mohajer, Noushin Ahmadi Khorasani, Parvin Ardalan, Shahla Entesari, Sussan Tahmasebi, Azadeh Forghani, Bahareh Hedayat and Bahare Alavi; Maryam Zia, Nasim Soltan Beigi, and Alieh Eghdam Doost did not receive their sentences at the same time. In an interview, prominent lawyer and Nobel Peace Prize laureate Shirin Ebadi called charges against the women baseless. The sentences included jail terms, some of them suspended, and also various numbers of lashes. Nahid Siamdoust, writing in the New York Times, referred to the campaign as having been "crushed".

According to California State University professor Nayereh Tohidi, women collecting signatures for the campaign were attacked and arrested, which has slowed down its progress, causing the need to extend its two-year target. For example, in March 2007, 33 women were arrested, mostly outside a Tehran courtroom where they had gathered to protest peacefully against the trial of five women—Fariba Davoudi Mohajer, Shahla Entesari, Noushin Ahmadi Khorassani, Parvin Ardalan and Sussan Tahmasebi – who were accused of “propaganda against the system”, “acting against national security” and “participating in an illegal demonstration” in connection with the 12 June 2006 demonstration. As well as four of the women on trial, those arrested included Shadi Sadr and Mahboubeh Abbasgholizadeh, who were held over two weeks before being released on bail.

On 4 November 2007, Ronak Safazadeh was arrested, the day after she collected signatures at a Children's Day celebration for the One Million Signature Campaign.

On 12 June 2008 Nasrin Sotoodeh and eight other women were arrested by security forces as they were preparing to attend a conference commemorating the national day of solidarity of Iranian women.

After the victory over the marriage bill in September 2008, a court sentenced to jail four women leaders involved in the One Million Signatures campaign, for contributing to banned websites. They were identified as Maryam Hosseinkhah, Nahid Keshavarz, Jelveh Javaheri and Parvin Ardalan.

In October 2008, Esha Momeni, a graduate student of the School of Communications, Media and Arts at California State University, interviewed activists in Tehran for a film as part of her California-based studies. She was arrested, initially for a driving offence, and prominent Iranian lawyer Mohammad Ali Dadkhah quoted officials of the Islamic Revolutionary Court as saying her detention related to involvement in the One Million Signatures campaign. Momeni was released on bail in November 2008 after 28 days in Evin Prison, but was not allowed to leave Iran. In May 2009, she was still there.

== Recognition and awards ==
=== Olof Palme Prize 2007 ===
Journalist and activist Parvin Ardalan should have been in Stockholm on 6 March 2008. She was to receive the 2007 Olof Palme Prize in recognition of her leading role in the One Million Signatures campaign for women's equality in Iran. However, on 3 March, airport security officials removed her from a flight about to take off from Tehran's international airport, seized her passport, and served her with a summons to appear in court.

=== Reporters Without Borders/Deutsche Welle ===
In 2008, the prize of Reporters Without Borders and Deutsche Welle was awarded to the campaign's website (which is called Change For Equality).

=== Simone de Beauvoir prize ===
In January 2009, the campaign was awarded the Simone De Beauvoir Prize for Women's Freedom (Prix Simone de Beauvoir pour la liberté des femmes) in recognition of its significant impact on Iranian society.

=== Anna Politkovskaya Award ===
In 2009 One Million Signatures received the Anna Politkovskaya Award.

=== Global Women's Rights award ===
The Feminist Majority Foundation honored the One Million Signatures Campaign as a recipient of the 2009 Global Women's Rights Award. This award was presented to the Campaign, "in special recognition of their groundbreaking work to demand an end to discriminatory laws in Iran against women."

=== Iranian Women's One Million Signatures Campaign for Equality: The Inside Story ===
In 2009 Women's Learning Partnership (WLP) published Iranian Women's One Million Signatures Campaign for Equality: The Inside Story written by Noushin Ahmadi Khorasani, one of the founding members of the campaign. Iranian Women's One Million Signatures Campaign for Equality: The Inside Story details the history, strategies, and values that brought together a diverse group of Iranian women, men, and activists for the well-known women's equality campaign. It is a valuable case study of a new model for grassroots movements in the 21st century, applicable not only in societies ruled by autocratic governments or influenced by radical fundamentalism, but also in more open and tolerant societies that have yet to achieve full equality for women.

=== Legislation ===
In 2008 the conservative Iranian government proposed a tax on prenuptial arrangements above a certain amount, to reduce the financial burden on men. Many leaders of the 'Signatures' campaign actively worked against it. In September 2008, the bill for the tax was returned to the legislative council, citing the problematic meddling of the government in private contracts; however, its primary opposition came from the perceived promotion of polygamy in the government's bill. The proposed polygamy and tax provisions were absent from the bill that was passed on 9 September 2008.

== See also ==
- Iranian women
- Iranian women's movement
- Intellectual Movements in Iran
- Human rights in Iran
- Women's rights in Iran

== Sources ==
- Update: A million Signatures for Women, February 13, 2007, Nobel Women's Initiative
- "Iran: Signature Drive Targets Gender Discrimination", 28 August 2006, Radio Free Europe/Radio Liberty
- Nayereh Tohidi, "Iran's Women's Rights Movement and the One Million Signatures Campaign", Payvand, December 16, 2006.
- Maura J. Casey, "Challenging the Mullahs, One Signature at a Time", The New York Times, 7 February 2007.
