= Shadi Amin =

Iranian writer and activist

Shadi Amin (Persian: شادی امین; born 1964) is an Iranian writer and activist. She was forced to leave Iran in early 1980s because of her political activities. Amin is currently living in exile in Germany.

== Biography ==
Prior to leaving Iran, Amin had to hide her sexuality in public, though she had freedom to express herself in her own family. Amin was politically active starting in 1979, when she was only 14: she was against Khomeini's rule. She was one of the supporters and members of OIPFG. Eventually, she had to flee in 1983, traveling to Pakistan, through Istanbul and Berlin to settle in Frankfurt.

She has researched gender discrimination, systematic oppression against women and the state of female homosexuals and transgender people in the Islamic Republic of Iran publishing a book called Gender X with her findings. An English synthesis of her findings by Raha Bahreini has been published as well, entitled Diagnosing Identities, Wounding Bodies. Amin has studied LGBT people in Turkey and describes Turkey as a place where people from Iran can readily seek political asylum.

She is a founding member of the Iranian Women's Network Association (SHABAKEH) and is currently one of the coordinators of the Iranian Lesbian Network (6Rang). As a coordinator for 6Rang, she comments on United Nations recommendations for human rights in Iran. She is also a co-founder of the organization Justice for Iran.

== Activities and publications ==
Amin organized a protest in 2000 at a conference in Berlin against the conservative backlash then occurring in Islamic State in Iran. As a member of the Berlin Exiled Women of Iran Against Fundamentalism (BEWIAF), she asked to open the conference with a moment of silence for victims of the Islamic Republic, while other members of BEWIAF opened up "the black chadors they were wearing, inside which were slogans against the meeting and the Islamic Republic." The act led to several members of audience attempting to stop the protestors and the police were called.

Amin won the 2009 Hammed Shahidian Critical Feminist Paper Award jointly with Golrokh Jahangiri. The award was created in memory of Iranian feminist scholar and professor Hammed Shahidian of the University of Toronto and is used to award funds for critical examinations in studies of Middle Eastern women. Amin used her award to research political prisoners in Iran in the 1980s and study rape and sexual abuse, which she presented at the seminar The Political Prisoners, Beyond the Wall, the Word held in Toronto in 2011. In 2012, Amin was part of a panel with Amnesty International, speaking at an event before the International Day Against Homophobia, Biphobia and Transphobia (IDAHO). In 2013, she participated in Turkey's Gay Pride as it was the closest location to Iran where a Pride event was hosted.

Amin took part in a panel with 6Rang at Istanbul Pride 2014, where she and others discussed forced sex changes that have taken place in Iran. She and Raha Bahreini spoke about these human rights violations against LGBTQ people in Iran at Stockholm Pride in Sweden in 2014. She was quoted by The Guardian, saying, "In a democratic society, a sex-change operation is an option for transsexuals, but in Iran it's an obligation for their survival."

Her selection and translation of Adrienne Rich and Audre Lorde's articles were published in a book entitled Ghodrat va Lezzat (Power and Joy) which is one of the few Persian resources on compulsory heteronormativity and lesbian existence. She is the co-writer of Crime and Impunity; Sexual Torture of Women in Islamic Prisons. Amin researched, did fieldwork and provided literature review for the publication on human rights violations against LGBT individuals in Iran, Patholigizing Identities, Paralyzing Bodies: Human rights Violations Against Gay Lesbian and Transgender People in Iran (2014).

== Published works ==
- Amīn, Shadi (2006). Qudrat va laz̲z̲at : Maqālāt-i barguzidah-i Adriyan Rich, Odri Lurd (in Persian) (Chāp-i 1. ed.). Kuln: Āidā. ISBN 978-398-0-91128-3. OCLC 173806928.
- Amin, Shadi; Sadr, Shadi (2012). Crime and Impunity: Sexual Torture of Women in Islamic Republic Prisons. Germany: Aida Book. ISBN 978-394-4-19190-4.
- Bahreini, Raha (June 2014). Amin, Shadi; Sadr, Shad; McDermott, Nicola (eds.). Pathologizing Identities, Paralyzing Bodies (PDF) (Report). Justice for Iran and Iranian Lesbian and Transgender Network (6Rang).
- Amin, Shadi (2015). Gender X.

== Documentary films ==
- 1995, Beijing Conference and Exiled Women
- 2000, Exilopposition und Berliner Konferenz
- 2012, Endless Nights of Women Prisoners
- 2013, Final Moments (runner up in the documentary category for the 2014 Women's Voices Now (WVN) Film Festival.)

== Awards ==
- 2009, Hammed Shahidian Critical Feminist Paper Award
- 2022, International Lesbian Visibility Awards
- L-Mag 2022 International Award for Lesbian Visibility.

== See also ==
- Shadi Sadr
- Iranian women's movement
