= Sepideh Rashnu =

Iranian writer and journalist

- سپیده رشنو
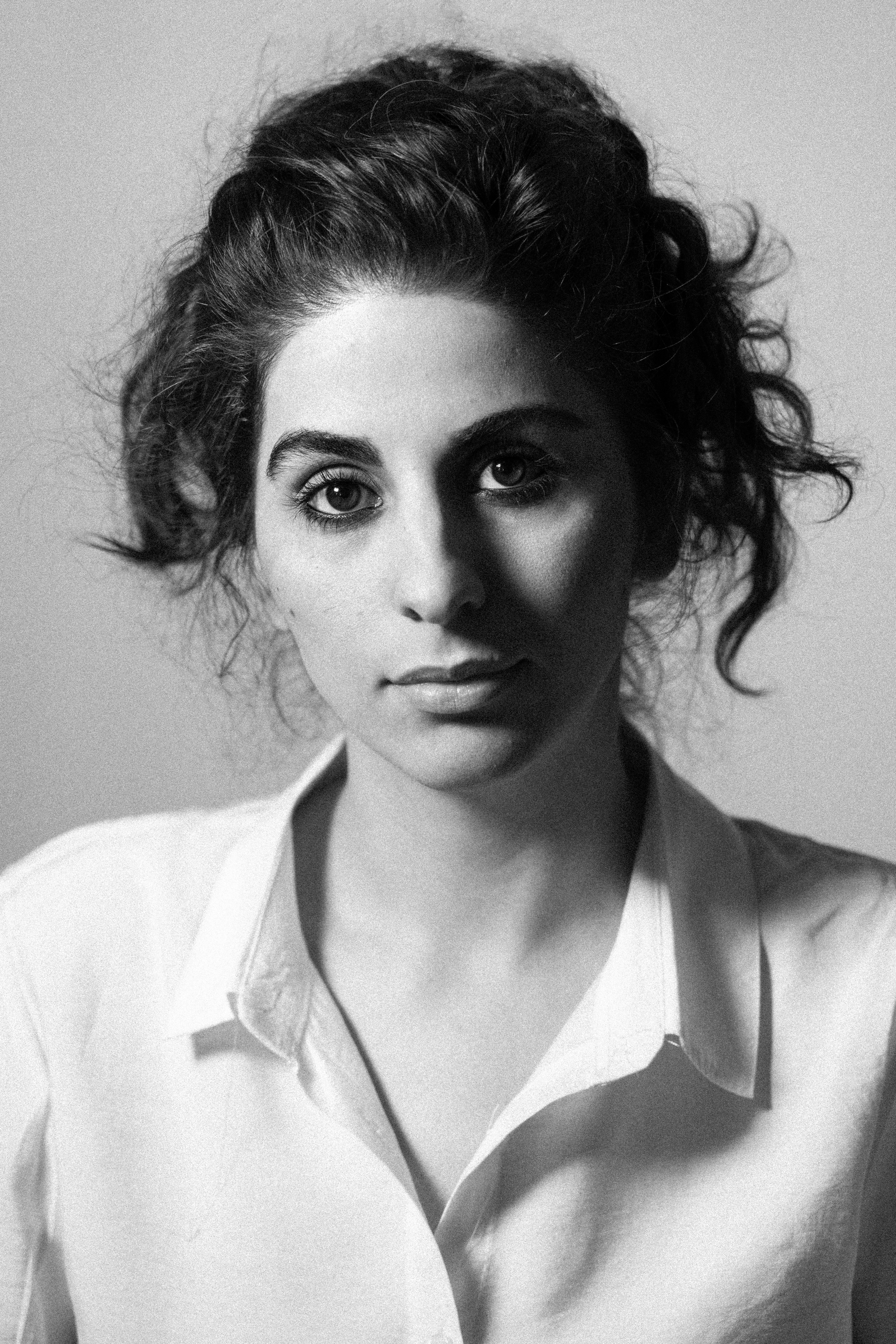
- Born: October 21, 1994 (age 30); Iran
- Occupation(s): Writer, poet, journalist
- Known for: Protesting against compulsory hijab in Iran

Sepideh Rashnu (Persian: سپیده رشنو; born 1994) is an Iranian writer, who is imprisoned for protesting against state-imposed hijab rules. In July 2022, she had an altercation on a public bus with another woman over the hijab rules, and the video went viral on social media.

== History ==
Sepideh Rashnu was arrested on 16 July 2022 after a video showing an altercation between her and Rayeheh Rabii on a bus went viral. The dispute arose because Rabii attempted to enforce the Iranian government's compulsory hijab policy, claiming Rashnu was not wearing her hijab 'properly'. Rashnu was assaulted during the altercation.

Later in July 2022, the state-run television, IRIB, played a video of Rashnu's confessions, which is said to have been recorded under duress. It has also been reported that a few days prior to the confession's recording she has been to a hospital in Tehran, because of internal bleeding, possibly because of torture.

She was released from Evin Prison on 30 August 2022 by providing 8'000'000'000 IRR (approximately USD $29,000) as collateral.

== Awards ==
In November 2023, Rashdu was included in the BBC's 100 Women list, an annual compilation that spotlights the most inspiring and influential women from around the world. This list features women who have made significant impacts in various fields, including activism, arts, sports, and science, celebrating their contributions to society and the broader global community.

== See also ==
- 2017–2019 Iranian protests against compulsory hijab
- Compulsory Hijab in Iran
- Forced confession
- Roya Heshmati
