= Bahara Alavi =

Iranian human and women's rights activist

- بەهارە عەلەوی
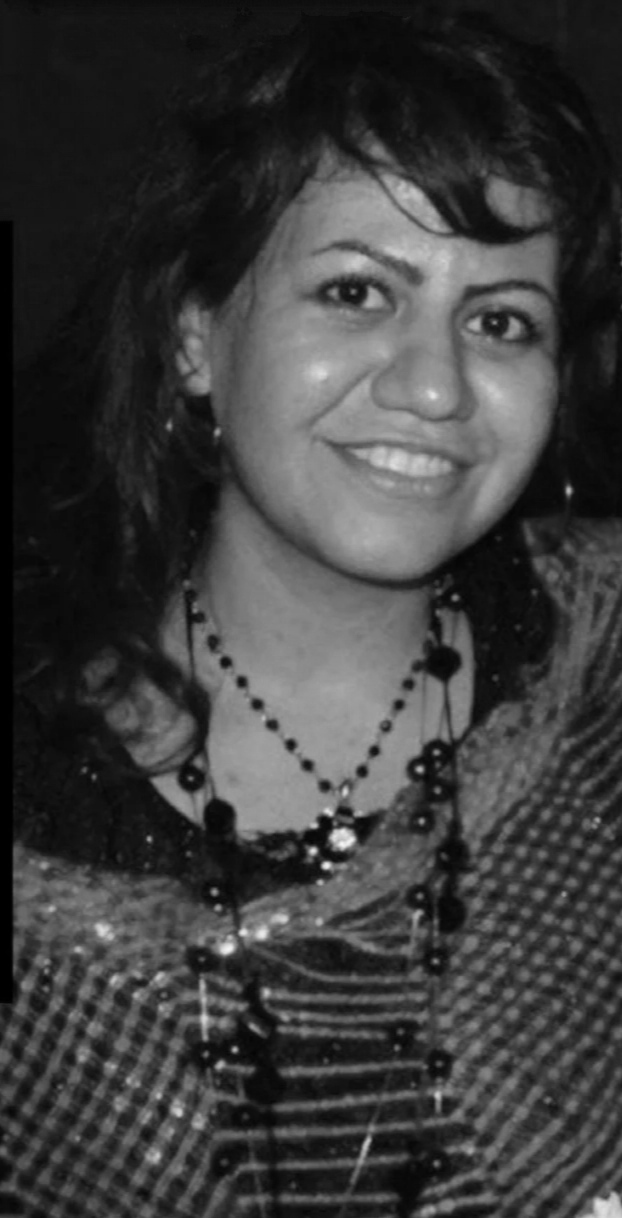
- Born: 1989; Saqqez, Iran
- Died: April 27, 2011 (aged 22); Sanandaj, Iran
- Resting place: Saqqez
- Occupations: Human rights activist and Women rights defender

Behare Elewî or Bahara Alavi (1989 – 2011) was an Iranian human rights activist, women's rights defender and blogger (writer). She was born to a Kurdish family in 1989 in the city of Saqqez, Iran. She was a member of the campaign to collect One Million Signatures to amend Iran's laws in favoring women's rights and died in a car accident in early 2011.

== Biography and activities ==
Bahareh Alavi started writing as a teenager in 2005 at the age of 16, at the same time as she began to ‌‌‌‌defend women rights, she began writing her blog, The Daughter of the Sun. Her blogs were generally on the subject of women and the taboo of feminist and sexist concepts.

She also participated in several specialized journalism courses due to her interest in journalism and intended to work professionally in this field. But surely the culmination of her work was the campaign of One Million Signatures to change laws in Iran that discriminated against women. She was one of the most active members of the campaign in Kermanshah and participated in many meetings and gatherings of the campaign in Tehran, Sanandaj, Rasht, Isfahan and Saqqez. Some of her articles have been published on different websites like the "Change for Equality" website. Another part of Bahareh's activities was in the field of defending political prisoners, especially in Kurdistan, and she sought to secure their release by contacting the families of the prisoners and conducting interviews with the media. She was one of the active protesters in the Green Movement and took an active part in the protest rallies in Kermanshah and the memorial of the killed. One of hers most active efforts was his presence in front of Sanandaj Prison and holding a protest rally to prevent the execution of Habibollah Latifi. In particular, she tried to draw attention to the situation of political prisoners in the cities.

One of her companions, Kaveh Kermanshahi, who won the Hellman/Hammett award from Human Rights Watch, presented it to Bahareh in an interview with Radio Zamaneh.

She died in a car accident on 27 April 2011.

Her death provoked wide reactions among the human and women's rights activists, several articles about her life and activities were published in various media. for instance: "The human rights community has truly lost a shining star, but as Change for Equality reminds us, Ms Alavi. will be "Missed, but not Forgotten." Below is a touching piece by Change for Equality detailing the exemplary life of Ms. Alavi ..."

Fred Petrossian from Spain In response to Bahareh's death, wrote she was the author of the Sun Girls blog one of iranian activists.

Rezvan Moghaddam graduated from the Department of Political and Social Sciences of Freie Universität Berlin wrote:

Many bloggers courageously broke redline in their writing especially when expressing their own experiences. One example is Khorshid Khanoom (Lady Sun), the weblog by Bahareh Alavi, a member of the "One Million Signatures" campaign. Her posts were simple, honest, and frank. She was not too ashamed to write about her sexual needs. At the same time, she was challenging the patriarchy and discriminatory laws against women.

=== Letter to the United Nations Economic and Social Council ===
She was one of the women rights activists who wrote a letter to the United Nations Economic and Social Council warning about Iran's membership in the organization in 2010. The letter states that:"We, a group of gender-equality activists, believe that for the sake of women's rights globally, an empty seat for the Asia group on CSW is much preferable to Iran's membership. We are writing to alert you to the highly negative ramifications of Iran's membership in this international body."

== Amnesty International ==
In 2011, Amnesty International named Bahareh Alavi one of the top 20 women's rights activists in Iran at an exhibition entitled "The Beating Hearts of the Iranian Women's Movement." In this Exhibition and seminar in Trinity College Dublin in 2011, Amnesty International while showing the biography posters and descriptions of the humanitarian activities of women rights activists in Iran including Bahara Alavi wrote: "Women in Iran are often portrayed as victims - helplessly unable to stand up and claim their own rights. The truth, however, is that Iranian women are at the very heart of the human rights movement, and are some of the most courageous and effective human rights campaigners in Iran".

According to Amnesty International and Human Rights Watch thousands of Iranian women have especially in recent decades protested against women's rights laws and called for them to be changed, and their goal is women's rights. In this country, many women's right defenders like Shirin Ebadi have had to choose between voluntary exile or staying in the country and being imprisoned.
