= Sussan Tahmasebi =

- سوسن طهماسبی
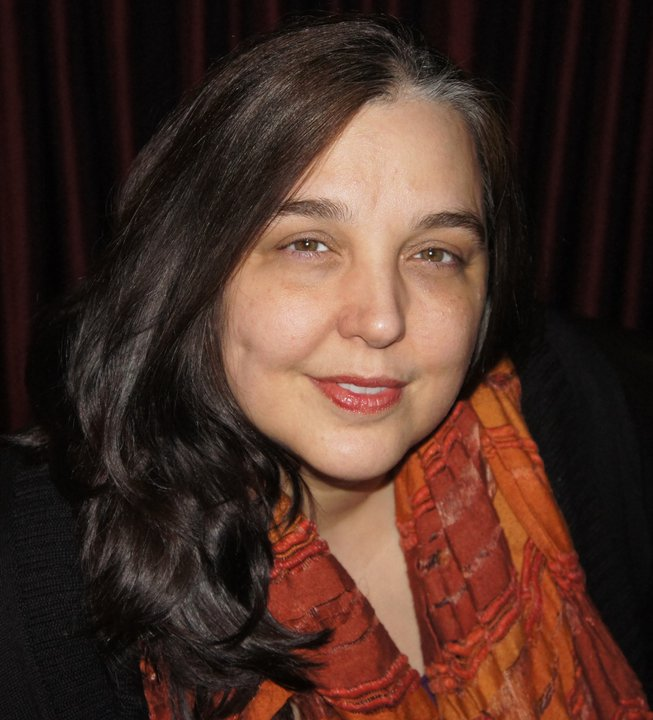
- Born: Tehran, Iran
- Occupations: Women's right advocate, co-founder of Femena
- Awards: Human Rights Watch's Alison Des Forges Award for Extraordinary Activism

Sussan Tahmasebi (Persian: سوسن طهماسبی) is a leading women's rights advocate and expert from Iran. ُHer work has focused on promoting women's rights and peace in the Middle East and North Africa and Asia.

== Early life ==
Tahmasebi was born in Tehran to an Iranian father and an American mother. The family migrated to the United States in 1978 in the lead up to the Iranian revolution. Tahmasebi moved back to Iran in 1999 staying for over ten years, where she became involved in Iranian civil society and the Iranian women's movement.

== Career ==
Tahmasebi is the co-founder and Executive Director of Femena, an organization which supports women human rights defenders, their organizations and feminist movements in the Middle East and North Africa and Asia regions. Tahmasebi is a leading expert on the situation of women in Iran and the Middle East. She is a founding member of the One Million Signatures Campaign, a grassroots effort working to end gender-biased laws in Iran. While in Iran Tahmasebi also worked to support the development of Iran's emerging civil society. To this end she co-founded the Iran CSO Training and Research Center and served as its board member. In the US she continued her work to promote women's rights and strengthen civil society with an expanded focus on the MENA/Asia region. She served as the Director of MENA/Asia region at the International Civil Society Action Network (2011-2017), an organization focused on promoting peace and women's rights, which she co-founded. Prior to moving to Iran, she worked in the United States to promote women's reproductive health and maternal and child health.

Tahmasebi is a non-resident fellow at Democracy for the Arab World Now (Dawn), board member of Doria Feminist Fund and is on the Human Rights Watch MENA Advisory Committee.

=== The One Million Signatures Campaign ===
Tahmasebi was a founding member of the One Million Signatures Campaign, a grassroots effort aimed as collecting one million signatures demanding an end to legal discrimination against women. She served as the editor of the English site for the Campaign. Tahmasebi was repeatedly banned from travel, interrogated and arrested in relation to her efforts to promote gender equality and as a member of the One Million Signatures Campaign. Along with other activists she was arrested on March 4, 2007. She was later sentenced to 2 years in prison, with 18 months suspended for 5 years.

== Awards ==
Sussan Tahmasebi was awarded the Human Rights Watch's Alison Des Forges Award for Extraordinary Activism in 2010 and 2011. In 2011 she was also recognized as one of "150 Women Who Shake the World" by Newsweek. Her work to support women's rights is featured as part of the permanent exhibition on the global human rights movement "A Spark Of Conviction" at the National Center for Civil and Human Rights, in Atlanta, GA. Tahmasebi was also honored by the National Center for Civil and Human Rights with its 2016 "Power to Inspire" Award. Also, in 2016, Tahmasebi's work to support women's rights and peace in the MENA and Asia region was recognized by the Association for Women's Rights in Development (AWID). One of "12 activists Who Make You Hopeful for Feminist Futures without Fundamentalism" Tahmasebi's pioneering work on behalf of women was honored, along with fellow rights activists Zainah Anwar and Dawn Cavanagh and others.
