= Ronak Safazadeh =

Ronak Safazadeh is an Iranian women's rights activist, and a member of the Azarmehr Association of Kurdish Women. She campaigned for women's rights by collecting signatures for the One Million Signature Campaign, an effort to remove discrimination against women from the Iranian legal code. She was arrested on November 4, 2007, the day after she participated in a Children's Day celebration in which she collected signatures for the One Million Signature Campaign. The Iranian authorities have not allowed her family to visit her, or revealed the reason for her arrest. She is currently imprisoned in Sanandaj prison.

On August 13, 2008, Safazadeh was charged at the Fourth Magistrate’s Branch of Sanandaj with “propaganda against national security” for leaking information about prison conditions at Sanandaj to the outside world. In April 2009, she was sentenced to six years in prison.

More than 600 members of woman's organizations have petitioned for Safazadeh's release. Amnesty International has featured Safazadeh in their Greeting Cards Campaign, urging people to send greeting cards to her with messages of support.
