= Shiva Nazar Ahari =

Iranian human rights activist

شیوا نظرآهاری Shiva Nazar Ahari
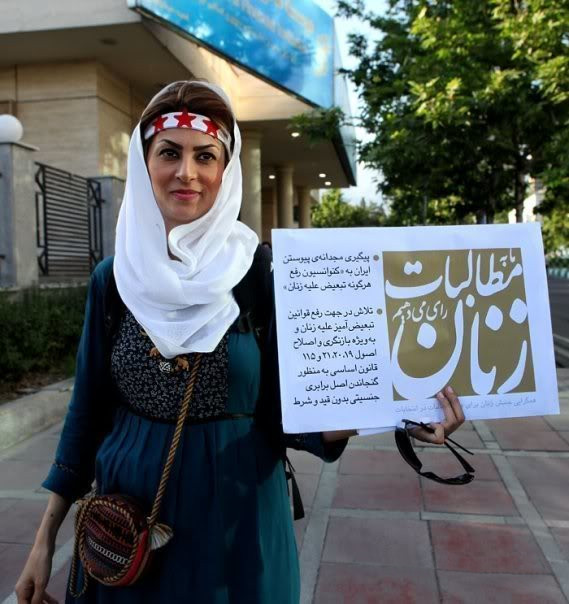
- Shiva Nazar Ahari (2009)
- Born: June 10, 1984 (age 41)

Shiva Nazar Ahari (Persian: شیوا نظر آهاری; born June 10, 1984) is an Iranian human rights activist and a founding member of the Committee of Human Rights Reporters. She has been jailed several times by the Iranian government.

== Early life ==
She was jailed on 14 June 2009 and held in the Evin prison until September 23, 2009, when she was released on an equivalent of a $200,000 bail. She had been in solitary confinement for 33 days.

On December 21, 2009, she was arrested once again along with several other activists who were on their way to the city of Qom to attend the funeral of Grand Ayatollah Hossein Ali Montazeri.

The most recent hearing was held on September 4, 2010, at the 26th branch of the Islamic Revolutionary Court of the Tehran province, with charges including "attempts to deface the Islamic government", "assembly with intention of conspiring against the Islamic government", "disrupting the public order" and moharebeh or "waging war against God". Since her arrest, the court proceeding has met with strong international criticism, the allegation being that it was an illegal measure taken by the Islamic Republic of Iran to further repress the rights of dissent and freedom of speech in the country, and her immediate release has been called for.
After 266 days in prison, she was released on September 12, 2010, on a bail of five billion Iranian rials (roughly equivalent to over $500,000).

Per a summons, Shiva Nazar Ahari appeared at Evin on September 8, 2012, to serve a 4-year prison sentence. A number of organizations call for her immediate release – Reporters without borders, World association of newspapers and news publishers or PEN International.

Since October 2018 Shiva Nazar Ahari has been living in Ljubljana (Slovenia), where she resettled with the help of the International Cities of Refuge Network (ICORN).

== Awards ==
On Sunday, March 13, 2011, it was announced that Shiva Nazar Ahari was the 2011 recipient of the Theodor Haecker Prize for "courageous internet reporting on human rights violations". The prize is named after Theodor Haecker, a philosopher, writer and anti-Nazi cultural critic.
