= Roya Heshmati =

Iranian activist against mandatory hijab

- Born: 1990 (age 35–36); Sanandaj, Iran
- Known for: Execution of whipping sentence for publishing photos without hijab on social networks

Roya Heshmati (Persian: رویا حشمتی), (born 1990 in Sanandaj) is an Iranian Kurdish activist known for her defiance against the mandatory hijab policy in Iran. Heshmati gained prominence for protesting by refraining from wearing the obligatory hijab in public spaces and sharing a photograph on social media without adhering to this regulation. Consequently, she faced arrest and was later sentenced to endure 74 lashes as a repercussion for her actions.

== Charges and arrest ==
After the publication of an image without Hijab on social networks by Heshmati, agents of the Islamic Republic entered her home late on the night of April 20, 2023, and arrested her. During this late-night raid, her mobile phone and laptop were also confiscated. Initially, she spent eleven days in detention on the charge of "appearing in public without proper religious hijab." However, ultimately, her case with separate charges and two separate indictments was referred by Branch 38 of the Judiciary to the Judicial Complex of Ershad and the Revolutionary Court.

According to Tatayi, Heshmati's lawyer, her charges in Branch 26 of the Revolutionary Court included "propaganda against the system." Additionally, in Branch 1091 of the Judicial Complex of Ershad, four charges were added to her accusations, including "appearing in public without proper religious hijab, causing public chastity injury, producing obscene content, and promoting corruption."

The Branch 1091 of the Judicial Complex of Eshrat sentenced Heshmati to 13 years and 9 months of imprisonment, a fine of 12,500,000 IRR, and 74 lashes. However, following an appeal against the verdict, the case was referred to Branch 14 of the Appeals Court in Tehran Province, resulting in the annulment of the imprisonment sentence. Nonetheless, the fine and the corporal punishment of lashes remained unchanged.

== Suffering whipping ==
On 3 January 2024, the lashes sentence for Roya Heshmati, for the charge of causing public chastity injury, was executed. After the implementation of this sentence, Heshmati published a note in which she wrote: "The judge said, 'Don't hit too hard.' The man started hitting me hard. My shoulders, my back, my buttocks, my face, my legs. I lost count of the number of lashes. Under my breath, I was reciting in the name of woman, in the name of life, the garment of slavery was torn, our dark night turns into dawn, all the shackles break." In her note, she explained that she refused to wear a headscarf in court, and then, in front of the judge, in what she described as "a medieval torture chamber," a man whipped her.

== See also ==
- Sepideh Rashnu
