= Justice for Iran =

Justice for Iran (JFI) is a London-based non-governmental human rights organization. The stated objective of the organization is to "address and eradicate the practice of human rights abuses and impunity that empowers officials of the Islamic Republic of Iran to perpetrate widespread human rights violations against Iranian citizens, and to hold them accountable for their actions."

== Objectives and mission ==
While traditionally plethora of human rights organizations have concentrated on documenting human rights abuses, lobbying and monitoring human right situations; JFI's distinctive mission is human rights advocacy to promotes accountability and redress. Helping to counsel and empower survivors and the relatives of victims is an essential part of JFI's work. By documenting, researching, awareness raising, advocacy and litigation, JFI, endeavors to serve as a source of analysis and information on the human rights situation in Iran, as well as an active NGO advocate in the international arena.

== Activities and projects ==
JFI's main areas of work include ethnic and religious minorities, LGBTIs, women, and those who are persecuted because of their political beliefs. To achieve its mission, JFI researches, documents, validates cases and uses various media outlets to enhance the situation of human rights. JFI seeks justice through international venues and institutions where local systems of justice and accountability are nonexistent or insufficient.

=== Litigation for human rights ===
In 2015, as a third party of interest, JFI intervened in the case of Mohammad Sarafraz and Hamid Reza Emadi two of the Islamic Republic (IRI) officials who had challenged their travel ban and asset freeze case before the European Court of Justice (ECJ). These sanctions were approved in March 2013 by the EU Commission due to their involvement in serious human rights violations. Both parties were found guilty of serious human rights violations by ECJ marking the first time that a European court held an IRI official accountable for their culpability in a torture related case. The court ruled that in their capacity as the authorities of the Islamic Republic of Iran's Broadcasting, IRIB, and its subsidiary Press TV, they were guilty of serious human rights abuses.

JFI presented expert witnesses who testified about the fact-based study of JFI called: Cut, Take Press TV off the Air. As a result, the sanctions against these two human rights violators remained in place.

Additionally, Islamic Republic media mouthpiece, Press TV, has also been taken off the air in several countries. JFI urged satellite companies and governments to take Press TV off the air, and sanction both the entity and the individuals who were responsible for human rights violations. Over the course of one year, Press TV was taken off the air by several satellite companies, such as Eutelsat, and in several countries, including Germany, Spain and the United States.

=== Human Rights Violators Database ===
Initiated by JFI, the Data Bank of human rights violators identifies perpetrators and collects evidence about their roles in gross human rights abuses. The specific aim of the program is to transform, redress and fight impunity in the Iranian legal systems where the judiciary is complicit with governmental transgression. Documenting organizations and individuals in violations of human rights is a JFI project which seeks to name and shame government officials who have been engaged in severe human rights violations. Through media coverage, direct sanctions and legal measures; JFI campaigns to shine the international spotlight on human rights violations of Islamic Republic of Iran officials. Many of those who were sanctioned by the European Union or the U.S. Treasury had been previously identified by Justice for Iran as human rights violators. Some of those individuals include Ali Ashraf, Esmail Ahmadi Moghaddam, Rashidi Aghdam, Morteza Kiasati, Seyed Mohammad Bagher Mousavi, Seyed Reza Mousavi Tabar, Mohammad Sarafraz, Assadollah Jafari, Hamid Reza Emadi, and Abdolsamad Khoramabadi and organizations such as IRGC's Center to Investigate Organized Crime and Ministry of Culture and Islamic Guidance.

Following advocacy campaigns by Iranian human rights activists, the Council of the European Union passed a regulation which allowed the EU to adopt restrictive measures, including travel ban and freezing of the assets, against those who were complicit in or responsible for directing or carrying out grave human rights violations.

=== Human Rights Defenders Program ===
==== A Legal Aid Clinic ====
JFI has pioneered a web-based pro bono legal and psychological hotline program to aid and assist activists and prevent future state sponsored violence. This program called Dastgiri also provides prerequisite security measures for those in critical situations and in a proper time generates coverage in Persian and international media as required. One of the features of JFI's Dastgiri program provides a link between those in need of legal assistant and those who can provide such services pro bono publico in Iran. Experienced lawyers help activists who have sometimes done nothing but merely participated in marching and have been arrested. This is one of the only Iranian online hotline networks which provides counseling, criminal defense, training in movement support, and litigation to challenge the system enabling impunity. This program has helped a wide range of activists such as women's right defenders, ethnic minorities, LGBT rights activists, human rights lawyers, journalists and political activists.

=== U.N. Advocacy ===
JFI also attempts to raise public awareness through the United Nations and other international mechanisms. Although, Iran has not ratified many international conventions like The Convention on the Elimination of all Forms of Discrimination Against Women (CEDAW) or the U.N. Convention against Torture, JFI has asserted the use of the remaining UN human rights mechanisms including United Nations Human Rights Treaty Bodies and Special Procedures. JFI regularly has submitted alternative reports pursuant to U.N. Commissions and has participated in advocacy efforts alongside other international organizations such as FIDH, REDRESS and Amnesty International. In 2013, the U.N. Committee on International Covenant on Economic, Social and Cultural Rights (ICESCR) in its Concluding Observations on Iran's implementation of the ICESCR adapted JFI's alternative report findings and expressed serious concern about a wide range of pressing substantive human rights abuses faced by women, children, Baha’is, workers and trade unionists, members of ethnic minorities including the Kurds, Ahwazi Arabs, Azeris, Baluchs and Afghans. refugees and migrants, and also members of the lesbian, gay, bisexual and transgender community. In 2015, issues raised by JFI in its submission to United Nations Universal Periodic Review resulted in 50 recommendations to Iran which directly addressed the issue of early and forced marriages, as well as the rights of women and gay and transgender people.

In October 2013, the UN Special Rapporteur on Violence against Women identified, one of JFI research projects regarding sexual torture, called Crime and Impunity as a primary source that has uncovered the cases of female political prisoners rape in "Islamic Republic of Iran throughout the 1980s, including the rape of young virgin girls before execution, forced marriages and other forms of sexual violence, some of which continues to this day."

Based on information primarily provided by JFI alternative report in 2016, the UN Committee on the Rights of the Child (CRC) reprimanded the Islamic Republic of Iran's delegation for failing to carry out institutional reforms which prescribes the marriages of children as young as nine years old and marriages of parents with their own stepchildren. JFI's findings were adapted by UN Committee on the Rights of the Child in the third and fourth periodic reports of the Islamic Republic of Iran.

In mid-November 2018 United Nations’ General Assembly's Human Rights Committee approved a resolution against Iranian government's continuous discrimination against women and limitation of freedom of thought.

=== Publications ===
According to JFI, along with its commitment to pursue Justice, JFI's founding principles includes active research on sociopolitical questions and a robust commitment to gather facts about the various human rights cases. JFI conducts fact-finding research to investigate human rights violations. Many of these reports are used as the basis for drawing international attention to Human Right violations and pressuring authorities in question. Issues raised by Justice for Iran in its reports include religious, ethnic, social and gender discrimination, torture, use of underage children for marriage, Hijab, impunity of state sponsored crimes, political corruption, abuses in Iranian civil and criminal justice systems, and the legalization of homosexuality and LGBTI rights. Here is a selected list of research reports and publications of JFI research in English:

1. The Unfinished Tale; The mothers and families of Khavaran: 30 years pursuit of truth and Justice (to be published in 2016).
2. Diagnosing-Identities-Wounding-Bodies: Human Rights Violations against Lesbian, Gay and Transgender People in Iran by Raha Bahreini (2014)
3. Thirty-five Years of Forced Hijab: The Widespread and Systematic Violation of Women’s Right in Iran by Maryam Hosseinkhah (2014)
4. Women’s Reproductive and Domestic Labour at the Service of Nation-Building by Maryam Hosseinkhah and Ananymous (2014)
5. Stolen Lives, Empty Classroom: An Overview on Girl Marriage by Maryam Hosseinkhah (2013)
6. Raped out of Paradise: Women in Prisons of the Islamic Republic of Iran (2013)
7. Putting a Face to the Crime; Islamic Republic Figures Responsible for the Persecution of Bahá’ís in Iran (2013)
8. Seeking Rights to Cultural Identity; The Deathly Struggle of Ahwazi Arab Activists (2013)
9. Crimes and Impunity: Sexual Torture of Women in Islamic Republic Prisons by Shadi Sadr and Shadi Amin (2012)
10. Iran: an Afghan Free Zone?! On the Situation of Afghan Migrants in Iran(2012)
11. Gerdab: A Dictated Scenario; Systematic Torture to Obtain Televised Confessions(2012)
12. Cut! Take Press TV off the Air(2012)
13. Stoning in Muslim Contexts: A Mapping Report(2012)

== Awards and honors ==
=== Bludgeon Award ===
Following an anti-women Iranian Supreme Court's decision in 2010, JFI nominated Ayatollah Gholam-Hossein Mohseni-Eje'i, as well as majority of the Iranian Supreme Court judges, for the International Bludgeon award. Bludgeon award is given by the Women's Link which seek to identify the best and worst judicial decisions that affect gender equality. Since based on this Supreme Court's decision, if a wife has disagreement with her husband and leaves him and the husband takes another wife without obtaining her permission, the first wife is considered to be disobedient and thereby cannot obtain a divorce. Ayatollah Eje’i won the International Bludgeon but did not attend the ceremony to receive his award.

=== Women’s Voices Now (WVN) Prize ===
In 2014, one of JFI's video production called Final Moment which is about the rape of virgin political prisoners prior to execution won the prize of the Women's Voices Now (WVN) Film Festival. It was also screened in Herat Women's International Film Festival where it was met with great enthusiasms and applause from the audience, especially Afghan women.
