= Parvin Ardalan =

Iranian women's rights activist, writer and journalist (born 1967)

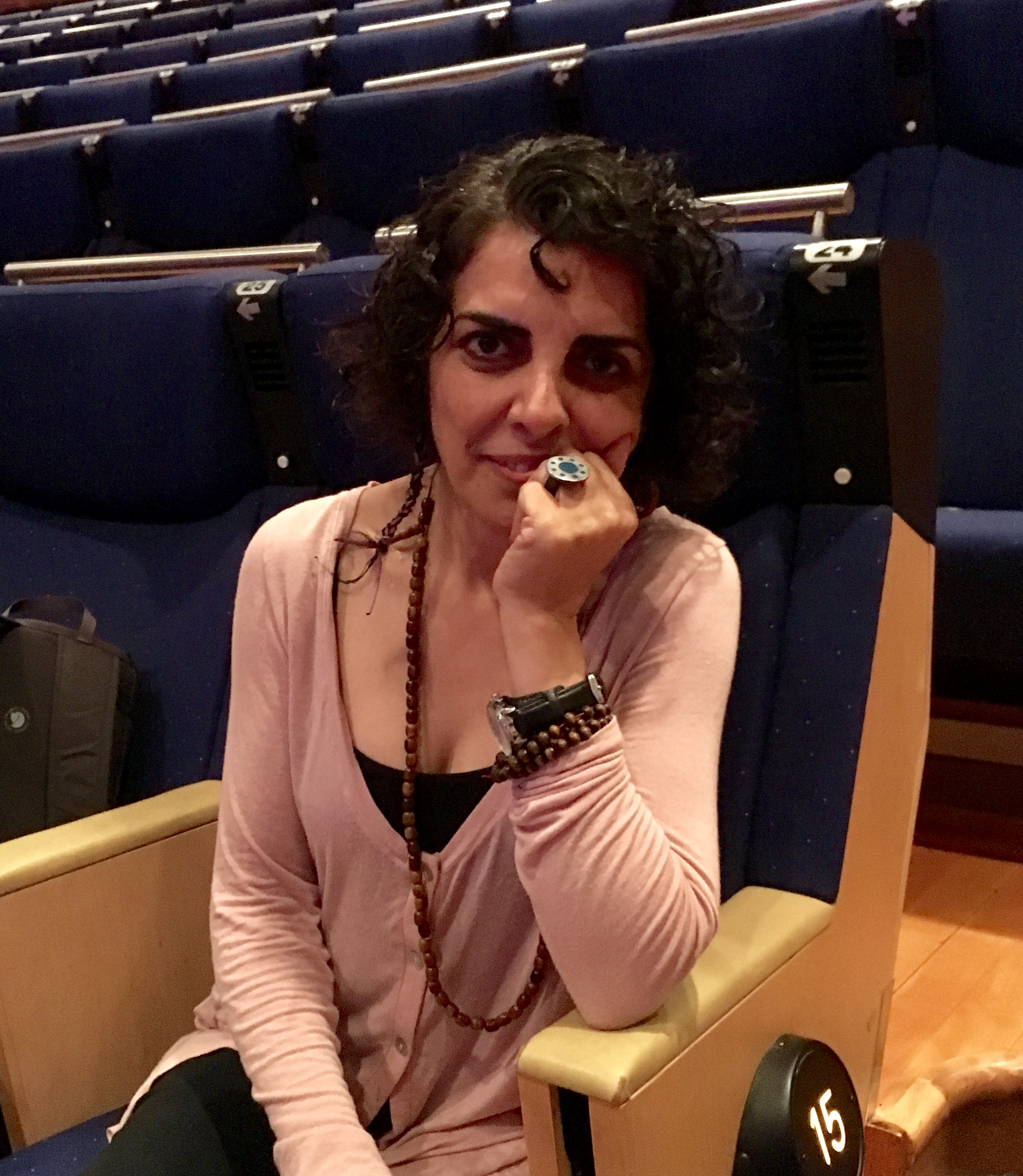
Parvin Ardalan (2016)

Parvin Ardalan (Persian: پروین اردلان; born 1967 in Tehran) with a Kurdish background, although not a Kurdish speaker, is a leading Iranian women's rights activist, writer and journalist. She was awarded the Olof Palme Prize in 2007 for her struggles for equal rights for men and women in Iran.

== Career ==
In the 1990s Ardalan, along with e.g. Noushin Ahmadi Khorasani, established the Women's Cultural Centre (Markaz-e Farhangi-ye Zanan), which since then has been a center for forming opinions, analyzing and documenting the women's issues in Iran. Since 2005 the organization has published Iran's first online magazine on women's rights, Zanestan, with Ardalan as its editor. In its constant struggle against censorship – the magazine comes back with a new name all the time – the newspaper has dealt with marriage, prostitution, education, AIDS, and violence against women. With Noushin Ahmadi Khorasani, Ardalan co-authored a book about the country's first female lawyer, Mehrangiz Manouchehrian, titled "Senator: the Work of Senator Mehrangiz Manouchehrian in the Struggle for Legal Rights for Women". The book received the Latifeh Yarshater Book Award in 2004.

=== One Million Signatures Campaign ===
Ardalan is one of the founding members of the One Million Signatures Campaign, attempting to collect a million signatures for women's equal rights, including by changing discriminatory laws against women. As a part of the campaign she has taken part in protests that have been violently silenced. In 2007 she, together with Noushin Ahmadi Khorasani, was sentenced to three years in prison for "threatening the national security" with their struggle for women's rights. Four more women's rights activists later received the same sentence.

=== Citizenship ===
In 2012 the Swedish Migration Board decided that Ardalan would be granted permanent residency in Sweden, where she had moved 3 years earlier.

== Awards ==
- Olof Palme Prize (2007)

== Other Activities ==
Parvin Ardalan is one of the members of the Feminists for Jina network, which was established following the nationwide Woman Life Freedom uprising initiated by a group of Iranian feminist activists.

== See also ==
- Iranian women's movement
- List of women's rights activists
