= Nayereh Tohidi =

Iranian-American scholar

Nayereh Esfahlani Tohidi
- Born: 1951 (age 74–75); Iran
- Other name: Nayyirah Tawhidi
- Education: University of Tehran, University of Illinois Urbana-Champaign, California State University, Northridge

Nayereh Esfahlani Tohidi (Persian: نیره توحیدی; born 1951) is an Iranian-born American professor, researcher, and academic administrator. Tohidi is a professor emerita and former chair of gender and women’s studies, and the founding director of the Middle Eastern and Islamic studies (from 2011 to 2021) at California State University, Northridge.

She is also a research associate at the Center for Near Eastern Studies of University of California, Los Angeles (UCLA), where she had coordinated the Bilingual Lecture Series on Iran since 2003. She specializes in the fields of gender, Islam, feminism, modernity, and democracy; ethnicity and ethno-religious movements; and human and women's rights in the Persianate and Turkic Societies of the Middle East, the Caucasus and Central Asia.

== Career ==
Her teaching and research areas include sociology of gender, religion (Islam), ethnicity and democracy in the Middle East and post-Soviet Central Eurasia, especially Iran and Azerbaijan. She is the recipient of several grants, fellowships and research awards, including a year of Fulbright lectureship and research at the Academy of Sciences of the Soviet Republic of Azerbaijan; post-doctoral fellowships at Harvard University; the Hoover Institute of Stanford University; the Kennan Institute of the Woodrow Wilson International Center for Scholars; and the Keddie-Balzan Fellowship at the Center for Near Eastern Studies at UCLA.

She has held visiting positions at the University of Iowa, the University of Minnesota, Harvard University, University of California, Los Angeles (UCLA), and the University of Southern California (USC). In 2015, she was awarded a grant from the National Endowment for the Humanities to develop and launch a minor in Middle Eastern and Islamic Studies in California State University, Northridge.

Tohidi's publications include editorship or authorship of Globalization, Gender and Religion: The Politics of Women’s Rights in Catholic and Muslim Contexts; Women in Muslim Societies: Diversity within Unity; and Feminism, Democracy and Islamism in Iran. Her work has appeared in Ms. magazine.

== Education ==
- Teacher Training Credential, California State University, Northridge, 1984 to 1986
- BS, Psychology (Major), Sociology (Minor), University of Tehran, Iran, 1975
- MA, Educational Psychology (Human Development), University of Illinois, Urbana Champaign, 1979
- Ph.D., Educational Psychology (Socio-Cultural Perspectives), University of Illinois Urbana-Champaign, 1983

== Publications ==
=== Books ===
- Feminism, Demokracy ve Islamgarayi (English: Feminism, Democracy and Islamism in Iran) (1996) [in Persian] (Los Angeles, CA: Ketab Sara Co., 1996; reprinted in Iran, 1998).
- Bodman, Herbert L.; Tohidi, Nayereh, eds. (1998). Women in Muslim Societies: Diversity within Unity. Boulder, CO: Lynne Rienner Publishers. ISBN 9781555875787.
- Tohidi, Nayereh; Bayes, Jane, eds. (2011). Globalization, Religion, and Gender: the Politics of Women's Rights in Catholic and Muslim Contexts. New York City, NY: Palgrave. ISBN 9780333947043.

=== Selected articles ===
- “Iran: les femmes dans la politique” in afkar/idées: Revue trimestrielle pour le dialogue entre le Maghreb, ľ Espagne et ľ Europe, No. 23, automne 2009, pp. 42–46.
- “Women and the Presidential Elections: Iran’s New Political Culture” in Informed Comment, September 3, 2009
- “Iran's Women's Rights Activists Are Being Smeared” in Women's e NEWS, 9/17/2008
- “Change in the ‘Family Law,’ the Last Stage of Secularization?”] In The Feminist School, June 17, 2008 (28 Khordad 1387), pp. 1-22
- “Ethnic and Minority Politics in Iran” (La politica sobre minorias ethnicas religiosas) in VANGURDIA Dossier: Iran por dentro, Numero 24, Julio/Septembre 2007: 90-95 (in Spanish language, Barcelona, Spain).
- “Ta`amol Mahali-Jahani Feminism dar Jonbesh-e Zanan-e Iran” [The Local-Global Intersection of Feminism in the Women's Movement in Iran] in Arash: A Persian Monthly of Culture and Social Affairs, No. 100, October 2007: 163-168 www.arashmag.com
- “One Million Sisters: US Feminists Rally in Support of Women’s Rights in Iran”. In Ms. Magazine, Fall 2007, p. 18.
- “Iran: Regionalism, Ethnicity and Democracy", in Open Democracy (June 29, 2006)
- “Women at the Forefront of the Democracy Movement in Iran", The International Journal of Not-for-Profit Law, Vol. 7, Issue 3 (June 2005)
- “In Memoriam: On Parvin Paidar” in Middle East Studies Association Bulletin, 39:2, (December 2005): [Longer version printed in six Internet and Print Journals: Iranian.com; Iran-emrooz.net; Iranokht.com; womeniniran.com; iftribune.com; Rahavard]
- "Revolution? What's in it for them? Globalized Iranian American women are nudging their homeland toward democracy", in The Los Angeles Times (July 31, 2005)
- “Women, Civil Society, and NGOs in Post-Soviet Azerbaijan,” in International Journal of Not-for-Profit Law, Vol. 7, No. 1 (November 2004)
- “No to Forced Veiling and No to Forced Unveiling: An Analysis of the French Law Banning the Headscarf” in Iranian Feminists Tribune, (December 31, 2003)
- “The Iranian Feminist Movement’s Global Connections” [Peyvand-e jahani-ye Jonbesh-e Zanane Iran] in Journal of Goft-O-Gu (Dialogue on Culture and Society), No. 38, Azar 1382 (December 2003), Tehran: 25–49. [Translated from the book chapter # 4 above]
- “Women’s Rising Self-Consciousness and Empowerment versus Recent Cases of Misogyny in Iran,” (Roshd agahi ve tavanmandi zanan ve nemoodha-ye tazeh az zan-setizi") in Iran-Emrooz, 25 Shahrivar 1382, in Persian (September 2003)
- “’Zanan’ Has Come to Bridge, Not to Separate" in Zanan (monthly journal in Persian published in Iran), Vo. 12, No. 100, Khordad 1382 (June 2003).
- “Student Movement: The Harbinger of a New Era in Iran” in ISIM Newsletter (International Institute for the Study of Islam in the Modern World), No. 4 (1999).
- “Women and Rights in Central Asia” in CIRA Bulletin (Center for Iranian Research and Analysis), Vol. 15, No. 1 (April 1999).
- “Jensiyyat, Moderniyyat, ve Demokracy, Part II” (Modernity, Tradition and Democracy) in Jens-e Dovvom (The Second Sex: Quarterly on Women's Studies) [in Persian, Tehran, Iran] Vol. 4 (January 2000): 26–42.
