= Habibollah Latifi =

Kurdish Iranian prisoner

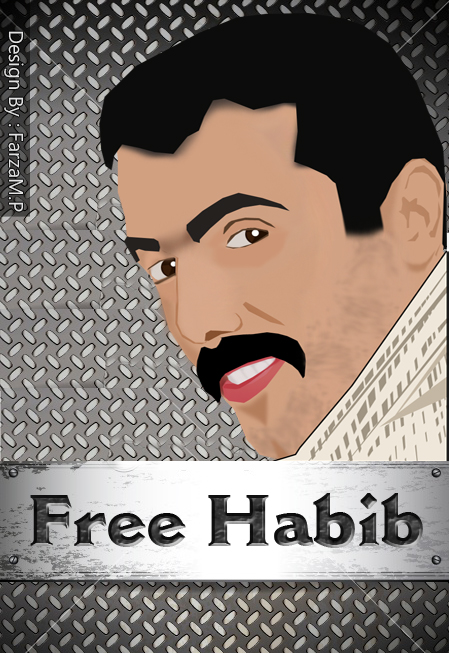
A poster in support of Habib's release "Free Habib"

Habibollah Latifi (Kurdish: حەبیبوللاه لەتیفی, romanized: Hebîbullah Letîfî) is a Kurdish Iranian law student at Azad University and a Kurdish activist who has been charged with Moharebeh ("waging war against God") and sentenced to death by an Islamic Revolutionary Court in Iran. He is charged with committing acts of violence (a charge he denies) in cooperation with the Party of Free Life of Kurdistan (PJAK) in 2007.

Latifi has been described as "a straight A student and an athlete who loves nature and his country's mountains." He was arrested in October 2007 and sentenced to death in 2008 in a court session that lasted a few minutes and that followed four months of interrogation and torture. His sentence was upheld by an appeals court in 2009. His lawyer was informed on Thursday, December 22, 2010, that Latifi was scheduled to be executed on Sunday, December 26, 2010, in Sanandaj prison in Kurdistan Province, Iran. His execution was halted after his lawyer requested further investigation into his case in a letter to judiciary chief Sadeq Larijani. Latifi met with his family on Sunday morning.

Amnesty International has asked Iran to commute Latifi's sentence. They note that he had no legal representation at his trial, which was held behind closed doors. "It is clear that Habibollah Latifi did not receive a fair trial by international standards, which makes the news of his impending execution all the more abhorrent," Malcolm Smart, Amnesty International's Middle East and North Africa director, said.

Regarding the charges against Latifi, his lawyer said, "He was not even present at Sanandaj during those times and was living a secret life at a different location. We have asked the initial court and the appeals court to look into these accusations and summon all who think Mr Latifi was present at any of these event and state have seen him during. On the other hand, we have asked the family whom have given refuge to Mr Latifi to be summoned and testify in court; which neither issue was addressed. The court has announced the reports of police officials are sufficient enough for the court to decide a ruling."

In May 2011 United4Iran reported that according to several sources Latifi was suffering "from various illnesses, including an intestinal infection, heart problems, and kidney failure."

Latifi's sister said, "I ask all Human Rights organizations and anyone who is able to help to come forward. But I still think what needs to be done has to be from inside the country."

On September 2, 2015, it was announced that Habibollah Latifi's death sentence has been cancelled by Ali Khamenei.

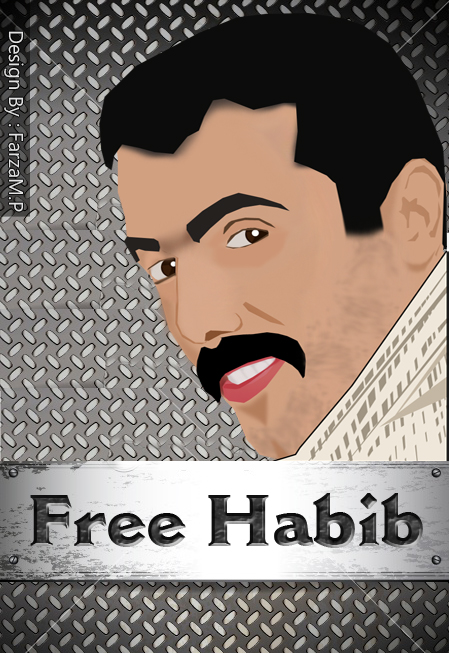
caption 1

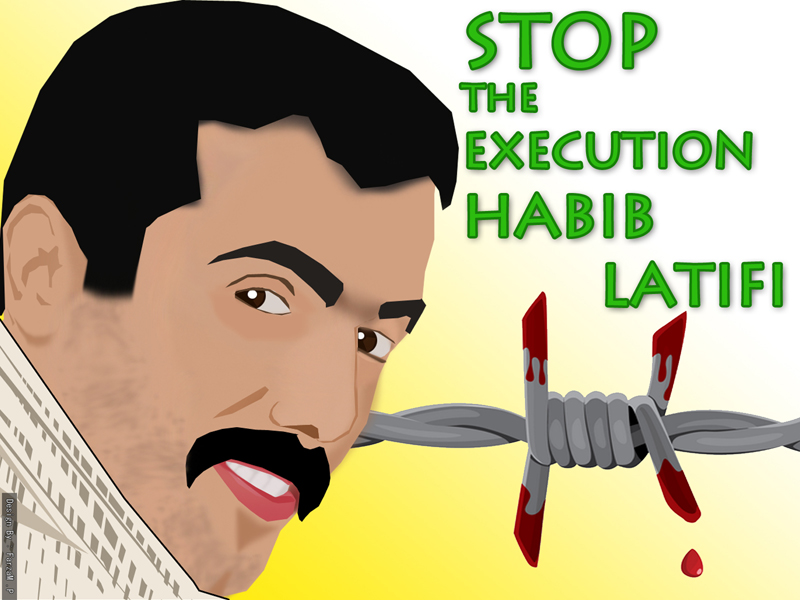
caption 2
