= Noushin Ahmadi Khorasani =

Iranian author, translator, essayist, journalist and activist

Noushin Ahmadi is an Iranian author, translator, essayist, journalist, women's rights activist and community activist. She is one of the founding members of the One Million Signatures campaign. She was also a founder of Women's Cultural Center (Markaz-e Farhangi-ye Zanan), an "NGO that focuses on women's health, as well as legal issues". Khorasani also wrote several books about the women's movement in Iran. Khorasani was the 2004 winner of the Latifeh Yarshater Award, given by the Persian Heritage Foundation, for a book she co-authored with Parvin Ardalan about the country's first female lawyer, Mehrangiz Manouchehrian, titled "Senator: the Work of Senator Mehrangiz Manouchehrian in the Struggle for Legal Rights for Women".

== Activism ==
In 2007 she, together with Parvin Ardalan, was sentenced to three years in prison for "threatening the national security." Ahmadi was released on 22 September 2010 after she appeared before the Evin Prison Court "to provide some explanations," and was informed of her charges. Ahmadi was interrogated when she first appeared in court on Tuesday following a summons, and was asked to return the next day to meet with "case analysts." On 23 September, she was informed of her charges of "propagation activities against the regime through: (a) writing and publishing content against the regime on the Feminist School website, and (b) participation in the illegal gatherings after the 2009 elections,". After being informed of her charges, Ahmadi defended herself and she was released to a custodian. She was released until her trial date. Ahmadi's trial was held on 11 March 2012 in Branch 26 of the Islamic revolutionary court. On 9 June 2012, she was sentenced to one year of suspended imprisonment and five years of probation.

== See also ==
- Iranian women's movement
- Mina Ahadi
- Sakineh Ashtiani
- Shirin Ebadi
- Marina Nemat
