= Parisa Pourtaherian =

Iranian photographer (born 1991)

- Born: 1 September 1991 (age 34); Semnan
- Education: University of Tehran
- Known for: Sports photography

Parisa Pourtaherian (Persian: پریسا پورطاهریان, born 1 September 1991) is an Iranian sports photographer. She is known as the first Iranian female photographer who covered men's football matches by capturing the match perched atop a nearby roof, since women journalists are not allowed to cover men's football inside stadiums.

== Career ==
Pourtaherian studied Industrial design at the University of Tehran, but she's been working as sport photographer, collaborated with F.C Kia, Volleyball Federation of Iran and Bam Khatoon Women's F.C.
