= Ketab Sara Co. =

- Native name: شرکت کتاب‌سرا
- Company type: Private joint stock company
- Industry: Books, Publishing
- Founded: December 31, 1981
- Headquarters: Tehran, Iran
- Key people: Sadegh Samii (Chairman of the Board); Shirin Samii (Vice President and Board Member); Banoo Alam (Managing Director and Board member)
- Number of employees: 12 (as of June 2010)
- Website: www.ketabsara.ir

Ketab Sara Co. (Persian: شرکت کتاب‌سرا, lit. 'Bookstore Company') sometimes written as Ketabsara, is a global publishing house founded in December 1981, in Tehran, Iran. They have published various historical, social and cultural works of Iran.

The publishing house founder and director Sadegh Samiei died in summer 2021.

== Sources ==
- Ameri, Ali. "Globalizing African Children's Tribulation." In Iran Daily, January 27, 2008, p. 12.
- Birjandi, Fazeli. "Negahi be Khaterat-e Ardeshir-e Zahedi: Harfha-ye Yek Mahram-e Shah [A look Ardeshir Zahedi's Memoirs: Hearing from a Shah's Confident]." In Etemad 1355, March 15, 2007, p. 5.
- Mehran, Ali. "After Love: The Novel that Challenges Male Domination in Iran." In Iran News, December 19, 1998, p. 14.
- Motalebi, Dariush ed. Marja-e nashr-e Iran, 1389 [Iran’s Publishing Sourcebook]. Tehran: Khane-ye Ketab, 2010.
- Sabooni, Amin. "Beyond Darkness: Connecting the Disconnected." In Iran Daily, April 28, 2009, p. 7.
- Shojai-Sain, Ali, ed. Karnameh-ye Nashr-e Iran: Fehrest-e mosui-ye ketabha-ye montasher shodeh dar sal-e 1388 [Iran’s Publishing Record: A Thematic Inventory of the Books Published in the March 2009 to March 2010 period], vol. 1-3. Tehran: Khaneh-ye Ketab, 2010.
- Yousefpour, Reza. "Open Doors Opens Publishing Ethics Issues." In Iran Daily, May 29, 2005, p. 12.
- "Agahi-ye Tasis [Foundation Record]." In Ruzname-ye Rasmi [Iranian Official Journal] 10754, 17 Dey 1360 [7 January 1982], p. 15.
- "Ibn Arabi Award Presented." In Iran News, January 28, 2008, p. 13.
- "Solh o Amniat dar Ketab Sara [Peace and Security in Ketab Sara]." In Honar-e Zaman/Art of Age 1(3), August–September 2007, p. 27.
