= Iran National Heritage List =

Officially registered historical monuments in Iran

Iran National Heritage List is a register of nationally significant monuments, places, buildings, events, etc., officially registered under the National Heritage Preservation Act of 1930. According to Article 1 of this law, "All the industrial monuments and buildings that were built up to the end of the Zand dynasty in the country of Iran, including movable and immovable in accordance with Article 13 of this law, can be considered as national heritage of Iran and under the protection and supervision of the state."

After 25 years, on 1 February 1956, with the registration of the Golestan Palace, the ban on the registration of works related to the Qajar era was practically lifted and subsequently the official list of these monuments was published under the current name.

== History ==
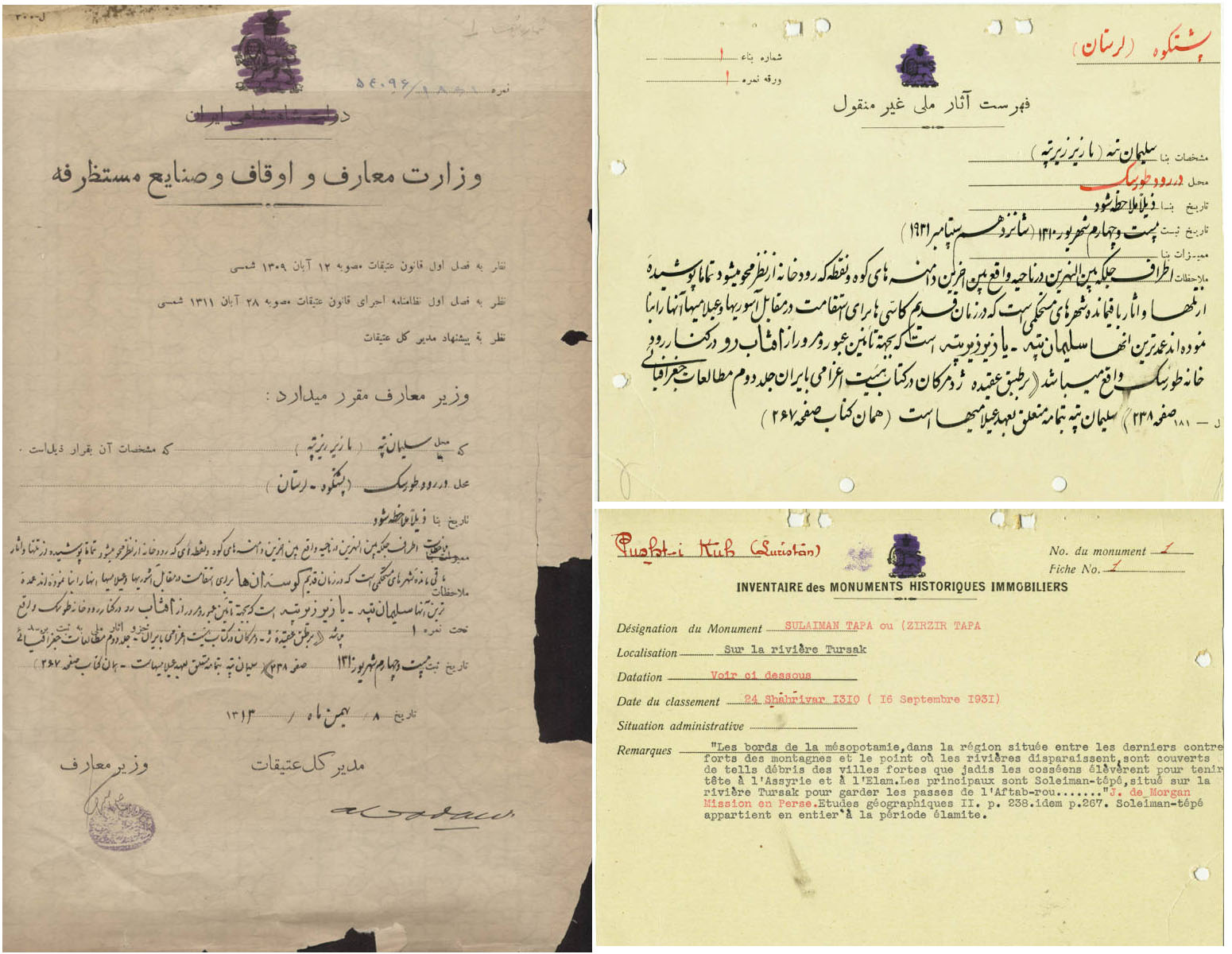
The first registered monument was Soleyman Tappeh in Ilam, recorded on 16 September 1931.

On 12 November 1930, with the approval of the Antiquities Act in the National Consultative Assembly, "all the works of ethnic groups who have lived on the territory of Persia until the end of the Zandieh era, are called antiques ... ." About two years later, on 19 November 1932, the law went into effect. By then, the Qajar items had not been registered. On 14 December 1934, the new memorandum was legalised, and thus the registry included the Qajar monuments.

André Godard, a French archaeologist and then an employee of the National Museum of Iran, registered 385 items. By the end of the Pahlavi era, 1633 items were registered. The first series of these national heritage monuments was registered on 16 September 1931, and the first official monument is Soleyman Tappeh in Ilam.

After the Iranian Revolution of 1979, the Ministry of Cultural Heritage, Tourism and Handicrafts was responsible for maintaining and renovating the national heritage.

== Criteria ==
The heritage places are either tangible, intangible, intellectual or natural. There are five criteria:

1. The item represents a period of national or international history with a high cultural and historical significance.
2. The item, belongs to, or is related to, distinguished personalities of the country's history.
3. The item has national or international significance representing a historical origin or milestone of human history.
4. The item has national or international significance that contains comprehensive information about human history, culture, civilization, science, art or has had major impact in these areas.
5. The item is respected and noteworthy by the general population.

== List of Iran National Heritage ==
=== No. 1 to 250 ===
Reg. no.	Name	Category	Historic Era	Reg. date	Location
1	Soleyman Tappeh (fa)	Mound	Elam Era	1931	Ilam (currently in the territory of Iraq)
2	Tappeh Baksayeh (fa)	Mound	Elam Era	1931	Ilam (currently in the territory of Iraq)
3	Seba'āt-e Kahriz (fa)	Mound	Elam Era	1931	Ilam (currently in the territory of Iraq)
4	Tappeh Shirvan (fa)	Mound	Sasanian Era	1931	Sarab-e Kalan, Sirvan, Ilam
5	Tappeh Lalar (fa)	Mound	Sasanian Era	1931	Mazraeh-ye Lah Lar, Badreh, Ilam
6	Darreh Shahr	Ancient City	Sasanian Era	1931	Darreh Shahr, Ilam
7	Tappeh Tarhan (fa)	Mound	Sasanian Era	1931	Tarhan, Kuhdasht, Lorestan
8	Tappeh Lart (fa)	Mound	Sasanian Era	1931	Abhar-e Pain, Badreh, Ilam
9	Andarkash Ruins (fa)	Ruins	1st millennium BC	1931	Egriqash, Mahabad, West Azerbaijan
10	Kohneh Shahr Ruins (fa)	Ruins	1st millennium BC	1931	Kohneh Deh, Mahabad, West Azerbaijan
11	Golga Tappeh (fa)	Mound	Prehistoric	1931	Mahabad, West Azerbaijan
12	Reishahr	Archaeological Site	Sasanian Era	1931	Bushehr, Bushehr
13	Qasr-e Abunasr	Ruins	Achaemenid Era	1931	Shiraz, Fars
14	Darabgerd (fa)	Ancient City	Achaemenid Era	1931	Darab, Fars
15	Qaleh Zahhak (fa)	Ruins	Prehistoric	1931	Kheyrabad, Fasa, Fars
16	Farashband Fire Temple (fa)	Fire Temple	Sasanian Era	1931	Farashband, Fars
17	Gur (fa)	Ancient City	Prehistoric	1931	Firuzabad, Fars
18	Istakhr	Ancient City	Achaemenid Era	1931	Marvdasht, Fars
19	Pasargadae	Ancient City	Achaemenid Era	1931	Madar-e Soleyman, Pasargad, Fars
20	Persepolis	Ancient City	Achaemenid Era	1931	Marvdasht, Fars
21	Naqsh-e Rostam and Ka'ba-ye Zartosht	Mausoleum and Rock Relief	Achaemenid Era	1931	Marvdasht, Fars
22	Naqsh-e Rajab	Rock Relief	Achaemenid Era	1931	Marvdasht, Fars
23	Sarvestan Palace	Palace	Sasanian Era	1931	Sarvestan, Fars
24	Bishapur	Ancient City	Sasanian Era	1931	Shapur, Kazerun, Fars
25	Fil Tappeh (fa)	Mound	Prehistoric	1931	Yusefabad, Asadabad, Hamadan
26	Behistun (fa)	Archaeological Site	Achaemenid, Sasanian Era	1931	Bisotun, Harsin, Kermanshahan
27	Takht-e Shirin (fa)	Archaeological Site	Sasanian Era	1931	Takht-e Shirin, Sahneh, Kermanshahan
28	Ecbatana	Archaeological Site	Median Era	1931	Hamadan, Hamadan
29	Pit Bunaki (fa)	Mound	Elam Era	1931	Guran, Holeylan, Ilam
30	Ghaldan Tappeh (fa)	Mound	Prehistoric	1931	Gholaman, Chegeni, Lorestan
31	Temple of Anahita	Archaeological Site	Arsacid Era	1931	Kangavar, Kermanshahan
32	Khosrow Palace	Archaeological Site	Sasanian Era	1931	Qasr-e Shirin, Kermanshahan
33	Hulwan (fa)	Mound	Assyrian Era	1931	Sarpol-e Zahab, Kermanshahan
34	Massudiyeh Building (fa) demolished in 1963	Building	Qajar Era	1931	Taq-e Bostan, Kermanshah, Kermanshahan
35	Gambadneh (fa)	Archaeological Site	Sasanian Era	1931	Kermanshah, Kermanshahan
36	Tappeh Giyan	Mound	Prehistoric	1931	Giyan, Nahavand, Hamadan
37	Ruins of Zavareh (fa)	Ancient City	Sasanian Era	1931	Zavareh, Ardestan, Isfahan
38	Tappeh Sialk	Mound	Prehistoric	1931	Kashan, Isfahan
39	Bazeh Hur Fire Temple (fa)	Fire Temple	Sasanian Era	1931	Bazeh Hur, Mashhad, Razavi Khorasan
40	Tappeh Hissar	Mound	Prehistoric	1931	Damghan, Semnan
41	Hyrcania (fa)	Archaeological Site	Achaemenid, Sasanian Era	1931	Gonbad-e Kavus, Golestan
42	Old City of Ask (fa)	Archaeological Site	Sasanian Era	1931	Hendijan, Khuzestan
43	Hormuz Ardeshir	Archaeological Site	Sasanian Era	1931	Ahvaz, Khuzestan
44	Ancient City of Behbahan (fa)	Archaeological Site	Sasanian Era	1931	Behbahan, Khuzestan
45	Askar Mokram (fa)	Archaeological Site	Sasanian Era	1931	Shushtar, Khuzestan
46	Gundeshapur	Archaeological Site	Sasanian Era	1931	Shahabad, Dezful, Khuzestan
47	Eyvan-e Karkheh (fa)	Archaeological Site	Sasanian Era	1931	Shush, Khuzestan
48	Mahruban (fa)	Archaeological Site	Sasanian Era	1931	Hendijan, Khuzestan
49	Izaj (fa)	Ancient City	Sasanian Era	1931	Izeh, Khuzestan
50	Ramhormoz Arc (fa) demolished in the 20th century	Ruins	Sasanian Era	1931	Ramhormoz, Khuzestan
51	Susa and Tomb of Daniel	Ancient City and Mausoleum	Achaemenid Era	1931	Shush, Khuzestan
52	Jiroft	Archaeological Site	Prehistoric	1931	Jiroft, Kerman
53	Sirjan Castle	Ruins	Sasanian Era	1931	Sirjan, Kerman
54	Mount Khajeh	Ancient City	Arsacid Era	1931	Hamun, Sistan and Baluchestan
55	Dahaneh-ye Gholaman	Archaeological Site	Achaemenid Era	1931	Zehak, Sistan and Baluchestan
56	Old City of Damavand	Old City	Historic	1931	Damavand, Tehran
57	Chehel Sotun of Ashraf (fa)	Persian Garden	Safavid Era	1932	Behshahr, Mazandaran
58	Safi Abad Palace	Palace	Safavid Era	1932	Behshahr, Mazandaran
59	Mausoleum of Mir Bozorg	Mausoleum	Safavid Era	1932	Amol, Mazandaran
60	Mausoleum of Naser-ol-Haq (fa)	Mausoleum	Safavid Era	1932	Amol, Mazandaran
61	Mausoleum of Mir Heydar	Mausoleum	Middle Ages	1932	Amol, Mazandaran
62	Fire Temple of Amol	Mausoleum or Fire temple	Sasanian Era	1932	Amol, Mazandaran
63	Emamzadeh Ebrahim (fa)	Emamzadeh	Safavid Era	1932	Amol, Mazandaran
64	Mausoleum of Sheikh Safieddin	Mausoleum	Safavid Era	1932	Ardabil, Ardabil
65	Mausoleum of Sheikh Jebrail	Mausoleum	Safavid Era	1932	Kalkhuran, Ardabil, Ardabil
66	Turang Tappeh	Mound	Prehistoric	1932	Turang Tappeh, Gorgan, Golestan
67	Mausoleum of Mohammad Taher (fa)	Mausoleum	Timurid Era	1932	Soltan Mohammad Taher, Babol, Mazandaran
68	Mausoleum of Sheikh Bastami	Mausoleum	Middle Ages	1932	Bastam, Shahrud, Semnan
69	Kashaneh Tower	Mausoleum	Ilkhanate Era	1932	Bastam, Shahrud, Semnan
70	Behistun Inscription	Rock Relief and Inscription	Achaemenid Era	1932	Bisotun, Harsin, Kermanshahan
71	Barm-e Delak	Rock Relief	Sasanian Era	1932	Shiraz, Fars
72	Shiraz Old Friday Mosque	Friday Mosque	Early Islamic Era	1932	Shiraz, Fars
73	Shiraz New Friday Mosque (fa)	Friday Mosque	Middle Ages	1932	Shiraz, Fars
74	Haft-Tanan Tekyeh (fa)	Tekyeh	Zand Era	1932	Shiraz, Fars
75	Khan Madraseh (fa)	Madraseh	Safavid Era	1932	Shiraz, Fars
76	Mausoleum of Abesh Khatun (fa)	Mausoleum	Safavid Era	1932	Shiraz, Fars
77	Khosrowgerd Minaret	Tower	Seljuk Era	1932	Khosrowgerd, Sabzevar, Razavi Khorasan
78	Valerian Bridge	Bridge	Sasanian Era	1932	Shushtar, Khuzestan
79	Mausoleum of Pir-e Alamdar (fa)	Mausoleum	Middle Ages	1932	Damghan, Semnan
80	Tarikhaneh Mosque	Mosque	Sasanian Era	1932	Damghan, Semnan
81	Damghan Friday Mosque	Friday Mosque	Middle Ages	1932	Damghan, Semnan
82	Emamzadeh Jafar (fa)	Emamzadeh	Middle Ages	1932	Damghan, Semnan
83	Mausoleum of Chehel-Dokhtaran (fa)	Mausoleum	Middle Ages	1932	Damghan, Semnan
84	Old Bridge of Dezful	Bridge	Sasanian Era	1932	Dezful, Khuzestan
85	Holy Saviour Cathedral	Cathedral	17th century	1932	New Julfa, Isfahan, Isfahan
86	Gonbad-e Qabus	Mausoleum	Middle Ages	1932	Gonbad-e Kavus, Golestan
87	Maiden Bridge	Bridge	Seljuk Era	1932	Mianeh, East Azerbaijan
88	Farashband Fire Temple (fa)	Fire Temple	Sasanian Era	1932	Farashband, Fars
89	Palace of Ardashir	Palace	Sasanian Era	1932	Firuzabad, Fars
90	Mihr-Narseh Bridge (fa)	Bridge	Sasanian Era	1932	Firuzabad, Fars
91	Firuzabad Tower	Tower	Seljuk Era	1932	Firuzabad, Khorasan
92	Ganjnameh Inscriptions	Rock Relief	Achaemenid Era	1932	Hamadan, Hamadan
93	Stone Lion of Hamadan	Sculpture	Arsacid Era	1932	Hamadan, Hamadan
94	Gonbad-e Alavian	Mausoleum	Seljuk Era	1932	Hamadan, Hamadan
95	Isfahan Friday Mosque	Friday Mosque	Early Islamic Era	1932	Isfahan, Isfahan
96	Mosque and Minaret of Ali	Mosque and Minaret	Seljuk Era	1932	Isfahan, Isfahan
97	Darb-e Kushk Gate (fa)	Gate	Middle Ages	1932	Isfahan, Isfahan
98	Mosque of Khwajeh Alam demolished in 1934	Minaret	Middle Ages	1932	Isfahan, Isfahan
99	Mausoleum of Nezam ol-Molk (fa)	Mausoleum	Seljuk Era	1932	Isfahan, Isfahan
100	Mausoleum of Baba Qassem	Mausoleum	Ilkhanate Era	1932	Isfahan, Isfahan
101	Mausoleum of Pir Bakran	Mausoleum	Ilkhanate Era	1932	Pir Bakran, Falavarjan, Isfahan
102	Naqsh-e Jahan Square	Town Square	Safavid Era	1932	Isfahan, Isfahan
103	Qeysariyeh Gate	Gate	Safavid Era	1932	Isfahan, Isfahan
104	Ali Qapu Palace	Palace	Safavid Era	1932	Isfahan, Isfahan
105	Sheikh Lotfollah Mosque	Mosque	Safavid Era	1932	Isfahan, Isfahan
106	Talar-e Ashraf (fa)	Palace	Safavid Era	1932	Isfahan, Isfahan
107	Shah Mosque	Mosque	Safavid Era	1932	Isfahan, Isfahan
108	Chehel Sotun Palace	Palace	Safavid Era	1932	Isfahan, Isfahan
109	Chaharbagh Boulevard	Boulevard	Safavid Era	1932	Isfahan, Isfahan
110	Allahverdi Khan Bridge	Bridge	Safavid Era	1932	Isfahan, Isfahan
111	Khwaju Bridge	Bridge	Safavid Era	1932	Isfahan, Isfahan
112	Emamzadeh Esmail	Emamzadeh	Seljuk Era	1932	Isfahan, Isfahan
113	Saru Taqi Mosque	Mosque	Safavid Era	1932	Isfahan, Isfahan
114	Emamiyeh Madraseh	Madraseh	Ilkhanate Era	1932	Isfahan, Isfahan
115	Dardasht Minarets	Minaret	Ilkhanate Era	1932	Isfahan, Isfahan
116	Chaharbagh Madraseh	Madraseh	Safavid Era	1932	Isfahan, Isfahan
117	Meydan Mosque	Mosque	Safavid Era	1932	Kashan, Isfahan
118	Zeyneddin Minaret demolished in 1931	Minaret	Timurid Era	1932	Kashan, Isfahan
119	Karkuyeh Fire Temple	Fire Temple	Sasanian Era	1932	Karkuh, Hirmand, Sistan and Baluchestan
120	Qasemabad Mil (fa)	Tower	Seljuk Era	1932	Qasemabad (fa), Zabol, Sistan and Baluchestan
121	Qazvin Friday Mosque	Friday Mosque	Early Islamic Era	1932	Qazvin, Qazvin
122					
123	Karat Minaret	Tower	Seljuk Era	1932	Karat, Taybad, Razavi Khorasan
124	Gonbad-e Sabz Mosque (fa)	Mosque	Seljuk Era	1932	Kerman, Kerman
125	Khargerd Friday Mosque (fa)	Friday Mosque	Seljuk Era	1932	Khargerd, Khwaf, Razavi Khorasan
126	Ghiasieh School	Madraseh	Timurid Era	1932	Khargerd, Khwaf, Razavi Khorasan
127	Aliabad Tower	Mausoleum or Tower	Timurid Era	1932	Aliabad-e Keshmar, Bardaskan, Razavi Khorasan
128	Fatima Masumeh Shrine	Shrine	Early Islamic Era	1932	Qom, Qom
129	Gonbad-e Sabz Mausoleum (fa)	Mausoleum	Ilkhanate Era	1932	Qom, Qom
130	Emamzadeh Shahreza	Emamzadeh	Safavid Era	1932	Shahreza, Isfahan
131	Khworheh Temple	Temple	Seleucid Era	1932	Khworheh, Mahallat, Markazi
132	Mausoleum of Shah Nematollah Vali	Mausoleum	Timurid Era	1932	Mahan, Kerman, Kerman
133	Kul-e Farah Rock Relief	Rock Relief	Elam Era	1932	Izeh, Khuzestan
134	Gonbad-e Sorkh	Mausoleum	Seljuk Era	1932	Maragheh, East Azerbaijan
135	Gonbad-e Kabud (fa)	Mausoleum	Seljuk Era	1932	Maragheh, East Azerbaijan
136	Borj-e Modavvar (fa)	Mausoleum	Seljuk Era	1932	Maragheh, East Azerbaijan
137	Gonbad-e Ghaffariyeh (fa)	Mausoleum	Ilkhanate Era	1932	Maragheh, East Azerbaijan
138	Goy Borj (fa)	Mausoleum	Seljuk Era	1932	Maragheh, East Azerbaijan
139	Marand Friday Mosque	Friday Mosque	Ilkhanate Era	1932	Marand, East Azerbaijan
140	Imam Reza Shrine	Shrine	Early Islamic Era	1932	Mashhad, Razavi Khorasan
141	Mosalla-ye Paein Khiaban (fa)	Maosque	Safavid Era	1932	Mashhad, Razavi Khorasan
142	Mausoleum of Khwajeh Rabie	Mausoleum	Safavid Era	1932	Mashhad, Razavi Khorasan
143	Naderi Mil (fa)	Tower	Seljuk Era	1932	Narmashir, Fahraj, Kerman
144	Nain Friday Mosque	Friday Mosque	Early Islamic Era	1932	Nain, Isfahan
145	West Radkan Mil (fa)	Tower or Mausoleum	Early Islamic Era	1932	Radkan, Kordkuy, Golestan
146	East Radkan Mil	Tower or Mausoleum	Seljuk Era	1932	Radkan, Chenaran, Razavi Khorasan
147	Mausoleum of Tughril	Mausoleum	Seljuk Era	1932	Ray, Tehran
148	Sahneh Rock Tomb (fa)	Rock Tomb	Median Era	1932	Sahneh, Kermanshahan
149	Anubanini Rock Relief	Rock Relief	Lullubi Era	1932	Sarpol-e Zahab, Kermanshahan
150	Parthian Rock Relief	Rock Relief	Arsacid Era	1932	Sarpol-e Zahab, Kermanshahan
151	Dokkan-e Davud Rock Relief	Rock Relief	Achaemenid Era	1932	Sarpol-e Zahab, Kermanshahan
152	Dokkan-e Davud Rock Tomb	Rock Tomb	Achaemenid Era	1932	Sarpol-e Zahab, Kermanshahan
153	Emamzadeh Mohammad Reza (fa)	Emamzadeh	Early Islamic Era	1932	Sari, Mazandaran
154	Mausoleum of Molla Majdeddin (fa)	Mausoleum	Early Islamic Era	1932	Sari, Mazandaran
155	Meydan Minaret (fa)	Minaret	Seljuk Era	1932	Saveh, Markazi
156	Saveh Friday Mosque	Friday Mosque	Early Islamic Era	1932	Saveh, Markazi
157	Saveh Friday Mosque Minaret (fa)	Minaret	Seljuk Era	1932	Saveh, Markazi
158	Tang-e Chowgan (fa)	Rock Relief	Sasanian Era	1932	Shapur, Kazerun, Fars
159	Statue of Shapur I	Statue	Sasanian Era	1932	Shapur Cave, Kazerun, Fars
160					
161	Khan Takhti Rock Relief (fa)	Rock Relief	Sasanian Era	1932	Khan Takhti, Salmas, West Azerbaijan
162	Semnan Friday Mosque Minaret (fa)	Minaret	Seljuk Era	1932	Semnan, Semnan
163	Semnan Friday Mosque	Friday Mosque	Early Islamic Era	1932	Semnan, Semnan
164	Mausoleum of Arsalan Jazeb (fa)	Mausoleum	Early Islamic Era	1932	Sang Bast, Fariman, Razavi Khorasan
165	Mausoleum of Baba Loghman	Mausoleum	Ilkhanate Era	1932	Sarakhs, Razavi Khorasan
166	Mausoleum of Öljaitü (Dome of Soltaniyeh)	Mausoleum	Ilkhanate Era	1932	Soltaniyeh, Zanjan
167	Mausoleum of Chalabioghlu	Mausoleum	Ilkhanate Era	1932	Soltaniyeh, Zanjan
168	Mausoleum of Hassan Kashi	Mausoleum	Safavid Era	1932	Soltaniyeh, Zanjan
169	Blue Mosque	Mosque	Qara Qoyunlu Era	1932	Tabriz, East Azerbaijan
170	Alishah Mosque	Mosque	Ilkhanate Era	1932	Tabriz, East Azerbaijan
171	Tabriz Friday Mosque	Friday Mosque	Seljuk Era	1932	Tabriz, East Azerbaijan
172	Taq-e Bostan	Rock Relief	Sasanian Era	1932	Taq-e Bostan, Kermanshah, Kermanshahan
173	Haruniyeh Dome	Mausoleum or Madraseh	Ilkhanate Era	1932	Tus, Mashhad, Razavi Khorasan
174	Mausoleum of Sheikh Ahmad Jami	Mausoleum	Ilkhanate Era	1932	Torbat-e Jam, Razavi Khorasan
175	Mausoleum of Qotbeddin Heydar	Mausoleum	Timurid Era	1932	Torbat-e Heydarieh, Razavi Khorasan
176	Varamin Friday Mosque	Friday Mosque	Ilkhanate Era	1932	Varamin, Tehran
177	Mausoleum of Aladdin	Mausoleum	Ilkhanate Era	1932	Varamin, Tehran
178	Taq-e Gara	Monument	Sasanian Era	1932	Sarpol-e Zahab, Kermanshahan
179	Mausoleum of Shahabeddin Ahari	Mausoleum	Safavid Era	1932	Ahar, East Azerbaijan
180	Ardestan Friday Mosque	Friday Mosque	Seljuk Era	1932	Ardestan, Isfahan
181	Gorgan Friday Mosque	Friday Mosque	Seljuk Era	1932	Gorgan, Golestan
182	Vakil Mosque	Mosque	Zand Era	1932	Shiraz, Fars
183	Sheikh Ali Rock Relief (fa)	Rock Relief	Sasanian Era	1932	Hajiabad, Marvdasht, Fars
184	Mausoleum of Sheikh Heydar	Mausoleum	Ilkhanate Era	1932	Meshginshahr, Ardabil
185	Lajim Tower	Mausoleum	Early Islamic Era	1932	Lajim, Savadkuh, Mazandaran
186	Shah Mosque	Mosque	Ilkhanate Era	1932	Mashhad, Razavi Khorasan
187	Natanz Fire Temple (fa)	Fire Temple	Sasanian Era	1932	Natanz, Isfahan
188	Natanz Friday Mosque	Friday Mosque	Ilkhanate Era	1932	Natanz, Isfahan
189	Tall-e Bakun	Mound	Prehistoric	1932	Marvdasht, Fars
190	Fahlian Ancient City (fa)	Ancient City	Arsacid Era	1933	Fahlian, Mamasani, Fars
191	Golpaygan Friday Mosque	Friday Mosque	Seljuk Era	1933	Golpaygan, Isfahan
192	Neyriz Friday Mosque	Friday Mosque	Early Islamic Era	1933	Neyriz, Fars
193	Resket Tower	Mausoleum	Early Islamic Era	1933	Resket, Sari, Mazandaran
194	Qom Friday Mosque	Friday Mosque	Early Islamic Era	1933	Qom, Qom
195	Ali Dome	Mausoleum	Seljuk Era	1933	Abarkuh, Yazd
196	Mausoleum of Tavus (fa) destroyed in the 20th century	Mausoleum	Ilkhanate Era	1933	Abarkuh, Yazd
197	Abarkuh Friday Mosque	Friday Mosque	Ilkhanate Era	1933	Abarkuh, Yazd
198	Emamzadeh Jafar	Mausoleum	Ilkhanate Era	1933	Isfahan, Isfahan
199	Emamzadeh Yahya	Emamzadeh	Ilkhanate Era	1933	Varamin, Tehran
200	Heydariyeh Mosque	Mosque	Early Islamic Era	1933	Qazvin, Qazvin
201	Mausoleum of Baba Rokneddin	Mausoleum	Safavid Era	1933	Isfahan, Isfahan
202	Cheshmeh Ali and Ray Castle	Ruins	1st millennium BC	1934	Ray, Tehran
203	Naqareh Khaneh (fa)	Mausoleum	Seljuk Era	1934	Ray, Tehran
204	Baba Abdollah Mosque (fa)	Mosque	Ilkhanate Era	1934	Nain, Isfahan
205	Mausoleum of Pir Hamzeh (fa)	Mausoleum	Seljuk Era	1934	Abarkuh, Yazd
206	Yazd Friday Mosque	Friday Mosque	Ilkhanate Era	1934	Yazd, Yazd
207	Mausoleum of Davazdah Emam	Mausoleum	Seljuk Era	1934	Yazd, Yazd
208	Mausoleum of Shamseddin (fa)	Mausoleum	Ilkhanate Era	1934	Yazd, Yazd
209	Mir Mosque (fa)	Mosque	Seljuk Era	1934	Natanz, Isfahan
210	Pamenar Mosque	Mosque	Ilkhanate Era	1934	Kerman, Kerman
211	Emamzadeh Yahya (fa)	Emamzadeh	Timurid Era	1934	Sari, Mazandaran
212	Mausoleum of Zeyn ol-Abedin (fa)	Mausoleum	Timurid Era	1934	Sari, Mazandaran
213	Ali Qapu Gate	Gate	Safavid Era	1934	Qazvin, Qazvin
214	Tappeh Mortezagerd (fa) demolished in 2011	Mound	Prehistoric	1934	Mortezagerd, Tehran, Tehran
215	Ray Ancient City (fa)(fa)(en)	Ancient City	Prehistoric	1934	Ray, Tehran
216	Tappeh Tarababad (fa)	Mound	Sasanian Era	1934	Tarababad, Nishapur, Razavi Khorasan
217	Emamzadeh Darb-e Emam	Emamzadeh	Timurid Era	1934	Isfahan, Isfahan
218	Qotbiyeh Mosque (fa)	Mosque	Safavid Era	1934	Isfahan, Isfahan
219	Mausoleum of Amir Massoud (fa)	Mausoleum	Timurid Era	1934	Isfahan, Isfahan
220	Emamzadeh Harun Velayat	Emamzadeh	Safavid Era	1934	Isfahan, Isfahan
221	Mausoleum of Mir Emad (fa)	Mausoleum	Safavid Era	1934	Isfahan, Isfahan
222	Mausoleum of Seti Fatemeh	Mausoleum	Safavid Era	1934	Isfahan, Isfahan
223	Hakim Mosque	Mosque	Safavid Era	1934	Isfahan, Isfahan
224	Molla Abdollah Madraseh	Madraseh	Safavid Era	1934	Isfahan, Isfahan
225	Ali Qoli Agha Mosque	Mosque	Safavid Era	1934	Isfahan, Isfahan
226	Ali Qoli Agha Hammam	Hammam	Safavid Era	1934	Isfahan, Isfahan
227	Hasht Behesht Pavilion	Pavilion	Safavid Era	1934	Isfahan, Isfahan
228	Borujerd Friday Mosque	Friday Mosque	Early Islamic Era	1935	Borujerd, Lorestan
229	Darab Fire Temple (fa)	Fire Temple	Sasanian Era	1935	Darab, Fars
230	Damavand Friday Mosque	Friday Mosque	Seljuk Era	1935	Damavand, Tehran
231	Chehel Dokhtaran Minaret	Minaret	Seljuk Era	1935	Isfahan, Isfahan
232	Sareban Minaret	Minaret	Seljuk Era	1935	Isfahan, Isfahan
233	Raran Minaret	Minaret	Seljuk Era	1935	Raran, Isfahan, Isfahan
234	Emamzadeh Ahmad	Emamzadeh	Safavid Era	1935	Isfahan, Isfahan
235	Mausoleum of Sheikh Abolqasem (fa)	Mausoleum	Safavid Era	1935	Isfahan, Isfahan
236	Qadamgah Mosque	Mosque	Safavid Era	1935	Qadamgah, Zeberkhan, Razavi Khorasan
237	Emamzadeh Habib	Emamzadeh	Safavid Era	1935	Kashan, Isfahan
238	Fin Garden	Persian Garden	Safavid Era	1935	Kashan, Isfahan
239	Emamzadeh Hossein	Emamzadeh	Ilkhanate Era	1935	Qazvin, Qazvin
240	Emamzadeh Ali	Emamzadeh	Safavid Era	1935	Qom, Qazvin
241	Emamzadeh Yahya (fa)	Emamzadeh	Ilkhanate Era	1935	Tehran, Tehran
242	Seh Gonbad	Mausoleum	Seljuk Era	1935	Urmia, West Azerbaijan
243	Urmia Friday Mosque	Friday Mosque	Ilkhanate Era	1935	Urmia, West Azerbaijan
244	Nazar Garden	Persian Garden	Zand Era	1935	Shiraz, Fars
245	Kabir Minaret destroyed in the 20th century	Minaret	Seljuk Era	1935	Tabas, South Khorasan
246	Mausoleum of Rokneddin	Mausoleum	Ilkhanate Era	1935	Yazd, Yazd
247	Amir Chakhmaq Mosque	Mosque	Timurid Era	1935	Yazd, Yazd
248	Ardabil Friday Mosque	Friday Mosque	Early Islamic Era	1936	Ardabil, Ardabil
249	Minaret of Hassan Mosque (fa)	Minaret	Seljuk Era	1936	Ardestan, Isfahan
250	Golpayegan Minaret	Minaret	Seljuk Era	1936	Golpaygan, Isfahan

=== No. 251 to 500 ===
Reg. no.	Name	Category	Historic Era	Reg. date	Location
251	Soltani Madraseh	Madraseh	Qajar Era	1936	Kashan, Isfahan
252	Kashan Friday Mosque	Friday Mosque	Seljuk Era	1936	Kashan, Isfahan
253	Mausoleum of Khwajeh Atabak (fa)	Mausoleum	Seljuk Era	1936	Kerman, Kerman
254	Kurangun Rock Relief (fa)	Rock Relief	Elam Era	1936	Seh Talan, Rostam, Fars
255	Chal Talkhan (fa)	Mound	Sasanian Era	1936	Ray, Tehran
256	Mausoleum of Bibi Sharbanu	Mausoleum	Early Islamic Era	1936	Ray, Tehran
257					
258	Minaret of Domenar Madraseh (fa) destroyed in 1978 earthquake	Minaret	Seljuk Era	1936	Tabas, South Khorasan
259	Emamzadeh Zeyd (fa)	Emamzadeh	Safavid Era	1936	Tehran, Tehran
260	Sepahsalar Mosque	Mosque	Qajar Era	1936	Tehran, Tehran
261	Nezamiyeh Building (fa) demolished in 1950s	Building	Qajar Era	1936	Tehran, Tehran
262	Mosalla Madraseh (fa)	Madraseh	Safavid Era	1936	Yazd, Yazd
263	Ashtarjan Friday Mosque	Friday Mosque	Ilkhanate Era	1937	Ashtarjan, Falavarjan, Isfahan
264	Tang-e Karam Fire Temple (fa)	Fire Temple	Sasanian Era	1937	Tang-e Karam, Fasa, Fars
265	Barsian Friday Mosque	Friday Mosque	Seljuk Era	1937	Barsian, Isfahan, Isfahan
266	Emamzadeh Ahmad (fa)	Emamzadeh	Safavid Era	1937	Emamzadeh Bazm, Bavanat, Fars
267	Naqsh-e Shapur (fa)	Rock Relief	Sasanian Era	1937	Darab, Fars
268	Ardashir I Rock Reliefs (fa) (fa) (fa)	Rock Relief	Sasanian Era	1937	Firuzabad, Fars
269	Dokhtar Castle	Castle	Sasanian Era	1937	Firuzabad, Fars
270	Gar Friday Mosque	Friday Mosque	Seljuk Era	1937	Gar, Isfahan, Isfahan
271	Ilchi Mosque	Mosque	Safavid Era	1937	Isfahan, Isfahan
272	Dar oz-Ziafeh Minarets	Minaret	Ilkhanate Era	1937	Isfahan, Isfahan
273	Mesri Mosque	Mosque	Safavid Era	1937	Isfahan, Isfahan
274	Darb-e Jubareh Mosque (fa)	Mosque	Safavid Era	1937	Isfahan, Isfahan
275	Sorkhi Mosque (fa)	Mosque	Safavid Era	1937	Isfahan, Isfahan
276	Kerman Friday Mosque	Friday Mosque	Ilkhanate Era	1937	Kerman, Kerman
277	Mehmandust Tower (fa)	Mausoleum	Seljuk Era	1937	Mehmandust, Damghan, Semnan
278	Sarab-e Bahram (fa)	Rock Relief	Sasanian Era	1937	Sarab-e Bahram, Mamasani, Fars
279	Emamzadeh Eshaq (fa)	Emamzadeh	Seljuk Era	1937	Saveh, Markazi
280	Sadeh Mosque (fa)	Mosque	Ilkhanate Era	1937	Ij, Estahban, Fars
281	Sin Friday Mosque (fa)	Friday Mosque	Seljuk Era	1937	Sin, Borkhar, Isfahan
282	Surian Friday Mosque (fa)	Friday Mosque	Seljuk Era	1937	Surian, Bavanat, Fars
283	Zavareh Friday Mosque	Friday Mosque	Seljuk Era	1937	Zavareh, Ardestan, Isfahan
284	Pamenar Mosque (fa)	Mosque	Seljuk Era	1937	Zavareh, Ardestan, Isfahan
285	Ziar Minaret	Minaret	Early Islamic Era	1937	Ziar, Isfahan, Isfahan
286	Shushtar Friday Mosque	Friday Mosque	Early Islamic Era	1937	Shushtar, Khuzestan
287	Dezful Friday Mosque	Friday Mosque	Early Islamic Era	1937	Dezful, Khuzestan
288	Fakhrigah Rock Tomb	Rock Tomb	Median Era	1937	Egriqash, Mahabad, West Azerbaijan
289	Gur Tower	Tower	Sasanian Era	1937	Firuzabad, Fars
290	Emamzadeh Hefdah Tan (fa)	Emamzadeh	Safavid Era	1937	Golpaygan, Isfahan
291	Mausoleum of Esther and Mordechai	Mausoleum	Early Islamic Era	1937	Hamadan, Hamadan
292	Jarchi Mosque	Mosque	Safavid Era	1937	Isfahan, Isfahan
293	Lonban Mosque	Mosque	Safavid Era	1937	Isfahan, Isfahan
294	Emamzadeh Zeyd	Emamzadeh	Safavid Era	1937	Isfahan, Isfahan
295	Qaen Friday Mosque (fa)	Friday Mosque	Ilkhanate Era	1937	Qaen, South Khorasan
296	Dome of Jabalieh	Dome	Early Islamic Era	1937	Kerman, Kerman
297	Ganjali Khan Caravanserai and Madraseh	Caravanserai and Madraseh	Safavid Era	1937	Kerman, Kerman
298	Emamzadeh Ebrahim (fa)	Emamzadeh	Ilkhanate Era	1937	Qom, Qom
299	Daw-o-Dor Rock Tomb (fa)	Rock Tomb	Achaemenid Era	1937	Kupon, Rostam, Fars
300					
301	Dodar Mosque (fa)	Mosque	Timurid Era	1937	Mashhad, Razavi Khorasan
302	Emamzadeh Mohammad Mahruq	Emamzadeh	Timurid Era	1937	Nishapur, Razavi Khorasan
303	Takht-e Rostam Fire Temple (fa)	Fire Temple	Sasanian Era	1937	Qajar-e Takht-e Rostam, Shahriar, Tehran
304	Taq-e Farhad Rock Tomb (fa)	Rock Tomb	Achaemenid Era	1937	Shelin, Gilan-e Gharb, Kermanshahan
305	Naqsh-e Sheikh Khan Rock Relief (fa)	Rock Relief	Prehistoric	1937	Sarpol-e Zahab, Kermanshahan
306	Emamzadeh Haftad-o-Do Tan (fa)	Emamzadeh	Seljuk Era	1937	Saruq, Farahan, Markazi
307	Emamzadeh Alaeddin Hossein	Emamzadeh	Safavid Era	1937	Shiraz, Fars
308	Takht-e Soleyman	Ancient City	Sasanian Era	1937	Tazeh Kand-e Nosratabad, Takab, West Azerbaijan
309	Mausoleum of Abubakr Taybadi (fa)	Mausoleum	Timurid Era	1937	Taybad, Razavi Khorasan
310	Tang-e Sulak Rock Reliefs (fa)	Rock Relief	Arsacid Era	1937	Likak, Bahmai, Kohgiluyeh and Boyer-Ahmad
311	Atashkuh Fire Temple (fa)	Fire Temple	Sasanian Era	1938	Nimvar, Mahallat, Markazi
312	Jereh Fire Temple (fa)	Fire Temple	Sasanian Era	1938	Jereh, Kazerun, Fars
313	Bagh-e Qushkhaneh Minaret	Minaret	Ilkhanate Era	1938	Isfahan, Isfahan
314	Jaddeh Kuchak Mosque (fa)	Mosque	Safavid Era	1938	Isfahan, Isfahan
315	Qeysariyeh Bazaar (fa)	Bazaar	Safavid Era	1938	Lar, Fars
316	Niasar Fire Temple (fa)	Fire Temple	Sasanian Era	1938	Niasar, Kashan, Isfahan
317	Nishapur Friday Mosque	Friday Mosque	Timurid Era	1938	Nishapur, Razavi Khorasan
318	Mausoleum of Yusef Sarvestani	Mausoleum	Seljuk Era	1938	Sarvestan, Fars
319	Emamzadeh Jafar	Emamzadeh	Safavid Era	1938	Pishva, Tehran
320	Mausoleum of Ala od-Dowleh Semnani (fa)	Mausoleum	Safavid Era	1938	Sufiabad, Sorkheh, Semnan
321	Mausoleum of Prophet Qeydar	Early Islamic Era	1938	Qeydar, Zanjan	
322	Mausoleum of Chahar Padshahan	Mausoleum	Safavid Era	1938	Lahijan, Gilan
323	Emamzadeh Sahl (fa)	Emamzadeh	Safavid Era	1940	Astaneh, Markazi
324	Gaz Friday Mosque (fa)	Friday Mosque	Seljuk Era	1940	Gaz, Isfahan
325	Gonabad Friday Mosque	Friday Mosque	Seljuk Era	1940	Gonabad, Razavi Khorasan
326	Harsin Ruins (fa)	Ruins	Sasanian Era	1940	Harsin, Kermanshahan
327	Khan Mosque	Mosque	Safavid Era	1940	Isfahan, Isfahan
328	Kaj Friday Mosque	Friday Mosque	Ilkhanate Era	1940	Kaj, Isfahan, Isfahan
329	Sun Palace	Palace	Afsharid Era	1940	Kalat, Razavi Khorasan
330	Karaftu Caves	Archaeological Site	Prehistoric	1940	Saheb, Saqqez, Kordestan
331	Kazerun Fire Temple	Fire Temple	Sasanian Era	1940	Kazerun, Fars
332	Mausoleum of Hamdollah Mostowfi	Mausoleum	Ilkhanate Era	1940	Qazvin, Qazvin
333	Parizad Madraseh (fa)	Madraseh	Timurid Era	1940	Mashhad, Razavi Khorasan
334	Balasar Madraseh (fa)	Madraseh	Timurid Era	1940	Mashhad, Razavi Khorasan
335	Kashkan Bridge	Bridge	Safavid Era	1940	Chegeni, Lorestan
336	Sar Mashhad Rock Relief and Inscription (fa)	Rock Relief and Inscription	Sasanian Era	1940	Sar Mashhad, Kazerun, Fars
337	Emamzadeh Hossein (fa) reconstructed after 1978 earthquake	Emamzadeh	Safavid Era	1940	Tabas, South Khorasan
338	Toroq Mosalla (fa)	Mosalla	Timurid Era	1940	Mashhad, Razavi Khorasan
339	Emamzadeh Hossein (fa)	Emamzadeh	Ilkhanate Era	1940	Varamin, Tehran
340	Malek Zozan Mosque (fa)	Mosque	Seljuk Era	1940	Zozan, Khwaf, Razavi Khorasan
341	Akhangan Mil (fa)	Tower	Timurid Era	1942	Akhangan, Mashhad, Razavi Khorasan
342	Emamzadeh Qasem (fa)	Emamzadeh	Ilkhanate Era	1942	Babol, Mazandaran
343	Emamzadeh Ebrahim	Emamzadeh	Ilkhanate Era	1942	Babolsar, Mazandaran
344	Nevis Fire Temple (fa)	Fire Temple	Sasanian Era	1942	Nevis, Jafarabad, Qom
345	Farumad Friday Mosque	Friday Mosque	Ilkhanate Era	1942	Farumad, Meyami, Semnan
346	Emamzadeh Nur (fa)	Emamzadeh	Ilkhanate Era	1942	Gorgan, Golestan
347	Dashti Mosque	Mosque	Ilkhanate Era	1942	Dashti, Isfahan, Isfahan
348	Hashtal Tower (fa)	Mausoleum	Timurid Era	1942	Amol, Mazandaran
349	Menar Jonban	Mausoleum	Ilkhanate Era	1942	Karladan (fa), Isfahan, Isfahan
350	Emamzadeh Hossein and Ebrahim (fa)	Emamzadeh	Seljuk Era	1942	Isfahan, Isfahan
351					
352	Emamzadeh Mir Ahmad	Emamzadeh	Safavid Era	1942	Kashan, Isfahan
353	Gonbad-e Sabz Tekyeh (fa)	Tekyeh	Seljuk Era	1942	Kerman, Kerman
354	Mahyar Caravanserai (fa)	Caravanserai	Safavid Era	1942	Mahyar, Shahreza, Isfahan
355	Sarkucheh Mosque (fa)	Mosque	Early Islamic Era	1942	Nain, Isfahan
356	Mil-e Ejdeha Fire Temple (fa)	Fire Temple	Sasanian Era	1942	Mamasani, Fars
357	Pasangan Caravanserai (fa)	Caravanserai	Safavid Era	1942	Qom, Qom
358	Emamzadeh Abdollah (fa)	Emamzadeh	Early Islamic Era	1942	Sar Kalateh, Gorgan, Golestan
359	Robat-e Sharaf	Caravanserai	Seljuk Era	1942	Sarakhs, Razavi Khorasan
360	Abubakr Seddiq Mosque (fa)	Mosque	Seljuk Era	1942	Sangan, Khwaf, Razavi Khorasan
361	Emamzadeh Abbas (fa)	Emamzadeh	Ilkhanate Era	1942	Sari, Mazandaran
362	Shami Cemetery (fa)	Cemetery	Arsacid Era	1942	Shami (fa), Izeh, Khuzestan
363	Shah-e Cheragh Shrine	Shrine	Seljuk Era	1942	Shiraz, Fars
364					
365	Mausoleum of Sheikh Joneyd (fa)	Mausoleum	Seljuk Era	1942	Turan Posht, Taft, Yazd
366	Emamzadeh Azhar (fa)	Emamzadeh	Ilkhanate Era	1949	Dargazin, Qorveh-e Dargazin, Hamadan
367	Emamzadeh Hud (fa)	Emamzadeh	Ilkhanate Era	1949	Yengi Qaleh, Razan, Hamadan
368	Mausoleum of Shahshahan	Mausoleum	Timurid Era	1949	Isfahan, Isfahan
369	Qamsar Mosque (fa)	Mosque	Sasanian Era	1949	Qamsar, Kashan, Isfahan
370	Soleymaniyeh Palace	Palace	Qajar Era	1949	Karaj, Alborz
371	Kheyrabad Fire Temple (fa)	Fire Temple	Sasanian Era	1949	Kheyrabad, Gachsaran, Kohgiluyeh and Boyer-Ahmad
372	Bard Neshandeh Fire Temple (fa)	Fire Temple	Achaemenid Era	1949	Bard Neshandeh, Masjed Soleyman, Khuzestan
373	Mausoleum of Baba Afzal (fa)	Mausoleum	Ilkhanate Era	1949	Maraq, Kashan, Isfahan
374	Laodicea in Media (fa) (fa)	Archaeological Site	Seleucid Era	1949	Nahavand, Hamadan
375	Dar ol-Ehsan Mosque	Mosque	Qajar Era	1949	Sanandaj, Kordestan
376	Old City of Izadkhwast (fa)	Old City	Sasanian Era	1949	Izadkhwast, Abadeh, Fars
377	Aminiha Hosseinieh	Hosseinieh	Qajar Era	1949	Qazvin, Qazvin
378	Nimavar Madraseh	Madraseh	Safavid Era	1951	Isfahan, Isfahan
379	Gaz Caravanserai (fa)	Caravanserai	Seljuk Era	1951	Gaz, Isfahan
380	Isfahan Fire Temple	Fire Temple	Sasanian Era	1951	Isfahan, Isfahan
381					
382	Aqa Bozorg Mosque	Mosque	Qajar Era	1951	Kashan, Isfahan
283	Amir Chakhmaq Tekyeh (fa)	Tekyeh	Timurid Era	1951	Yazd, Yazd
384	Mausoleum of Pir (fa)	Mausoleum	Seljuk Era	1951	Takestan, Qazvin
385	Emamzadeh Mohammad (fa)	Emamzadeh	Seljuk Era	1951	Kakhk, Gonabad, Razavi Khorasan
386	Kasegaran Madraseh	Madraseh	Safavid Era	1951	Isfahan, Isfahan
387	Seyyed Mosque	Mosque	Qajar Era	1951	Isfahan, Isfahan
388	Abadei Mosque	Mosque	Qajar Era	1951	Isfahan, Isfahan
389	Chehel Sotun Palace	Palace	Safavid Era	1955	Qazvin, Qazvin
390	Shah Mosque	Mosque	Qajar Era	1955	Qazvin, Qazvin
391	Darb-e Kushk Gate	Gate	Qajar Era	1955	Qazvin, Qazvin
392	Tehran Gate	Gate	Qajar Era	1955	Qazvin, Qazvin
393	Shah Mosque	Mosque	Qajar Era	1955	Semnan, Semnan
394	Soltani Mosque of Borujerd	Mosque	Qajar era	1968	Borujerd, Lorestan
395	Arg Gate (fa)	Gate	Qajar Era	1955	Semnan, Semnan
396	Nasir ol-Molk Mosque	Mosque	Qajar Era	1955	Shiraz, Fars
397	Ebrahim Khan Bazaar (fa) (fa)	Bazaar	Safavid Era	1956	Kerman, Kerman
398	Khorramabad Kufic Inscription (fa)	Inscription	Early Islamic Era	1956	Khorramabad, Lorestan
399	Emamzadeh Ali (fa)	Emamzadeh	Ilkhanate Era	1956	Mashhad-e Ardehal, Kashan, Isfahan
400	Mausoleum of Khwajeh Tajeddin	Mausoleum	Safavid Era	1956	Kashan, Isfahan
401	Emamzadeh Ebrahim	Emamzadeh	Qajar Era	1956	Kashan, Isfahan
402	Mausoleum of Pir Davud (fa)	Mausoleum	Safavid Era	1956	Qamsar, Kashan, Isfahan
403	Tappeh Barmi (fa) (fa)	Mound	Elam Era	1956	Kimeh, Ramhormoz, Khuzestan
404	Eyn ol-Rashid Caravanserai (fa)	Caravanserai	Ilkhanate Era	1956	Garmsar, Semnan
405	Monastery of St. Thaddeus	Monastery	Early Christian Era	1956	Qareh Kelisa, Chaldoran, West Azerbaijan
406	Shah Abdol-Azim Shrine	Shrine	Early Islamic Era	1956	Ray, Tehran
407	Bahram Fire Temple	Fire Temple	Sasanian Era	1956	Qaleh Now, Ray, Tehran
408	Harun Prison (fa)	Prison	Early Islamic Era	1956	Mesgarabad, Ray, Tehran
409	Emamzadeh Esmail (fa)	Emamzadeh	Ilkhanate Era	1956	Tehran, Tehran
410	Pamenar Minaret (fa)	Minaret	Qajar Era	1956	Tehran, Tehran
411	Old Sepahsalar Madraseh (fa)	Madraseh	Qajar Era	1956	Tehran, Tehran
412	Marvi Madraseh (fa)	Madraseh	Qajar Era	1956	Tehran, Tehran
413	Abdol-Hossein Mosque and Madraseh (fa)	Mosque and Madraseh	Qajar Era	1956	Tehran, Tehran
414	Rajabali Mosque (fa)	Mosque	Qajar Era	1956	Tehran, Tehran
415	Azizollah Mosque (fa)	Mosque	Qajar Era	1956	Tehran, Tehran
416	Takht-e Marmar Iwan	Iwan	Zand Era	1956	Tehran, Tehran
417	Golestan Palace	Palace	Qajar Era	1956	Tehran, Tehran
418	Saltanatabad Palace (fa)	Palace	Qajar Era	1956	Saltanatabad, Tehran, Tehran
419	Sahebqaraniyeh Palace	Palace	Qajar Era	1956	Niavaran, Tehran, Tehran
420					
421	Dastva (fa)	Archaeological Site	Arsacid Era	1963	Shushtar, Khuzestan
422	Mausoleum of Bibi Dokhtaran	Mausoleum	Ilkhanate Era	1963	Shiraz, Fars
423	Tappeh Kalashi (fa)	Mound	Arsacid Era	1963	Rashi, Rudbar, Gilan
424	Sara-ye Moshir (fa)	Bazaar	Zand Era	1963	Shiraz, Fars
425	Geoy Tappeh	Mound	Prehistoric	1963	Urmia, West Azerbaijan
426	Cheraghali Tappeh (fa)	Mound	Prehistoric	1963	Nesfi, Rudbar, Gilan
427	Marivan Tappeh (fa)	Mound	Prehistoric	1963	Marivan, Kordestan
428	Tappeh Khalilabad (fa)	Mound	Prehistoric	1963	Shot, West Azerbaijan
429	Monastery of St. Stephen	Monastery	Early Christian Era	1963	Julfa, East Azerbaijan
430	Haftshuyeh Friday Mosque	Friday Mosque	Ilkhanate Era	1963	Haftshuyeh, Isfahan, Isfahan
431	Khorramdasht Fire Temple (fa)	Fire Temple	Sasanian Era	1963	Khorramdasht, Kashan, Isfahan
432	Emamzadeh Mohammad (fa)	Emamzadeh	Safavid Era	1963	Tafresh, Markazi
433					
434	Saravar Friday Mosque (fa)	Friday Mosque	Timurid Era	1963	Saravar, Golpaygan, Isfahan
435	Emamzadeh Abolfotuh (fa)	Emamzadeh	Safavid Era	1963	Vaneshan, Golpaygan, Isfahan
436					
437	Aveh Tappeh (fa)	Mound	Prehistoric	1963	Aveh, Saveh, Markazi
438	Tappeh Kalbali (fa)	Mound	Prehistoric	1965	Nazlu, Urmia, West Azerbaijan
439	Bogha Tappeh (fa)	Mound	Prehistoric	1965	Nazlu, Urmia, West Azerbaijan
440	Tappeh Asgarabad (fa)	Mound	Prehistoric	1965	Asgarabad, Urmia, West Azerbaijan
441	Tappeh Buzlu (fa)	Mound	Prehistoric	1965	Nazlu, Urmia, West Azerbaijan
442	Tappeh Barajuq (fa)	Mound	Prehistoric	1965	Barajuq, Urmia, West Azerbaijan
443	Tappeh Kordlar (fa)	Mound	Prehistoric	1965	Kordlar, Urmia, West Azerbaijan
444	Tappeh Balov (fa)	Mound	Prehistoric	1965	Balov, Urmia, West Azerbaijan
445	Tappeh Lulham (fa)	Mound	Prehistoric	1965	Lulham, Urmia, West Azerbaijan
446	Tappeh Gijlar (fa)	Mound	Prehistoric	1965	Nakhjavan Tappeh, Urmia, West Azerbaijan
447	Tappeh Sheikh Sarmast (fa)	Mound	Prehistoric	1965	Sheikh Sarmast, Urmia, West Azerbaijan
448	Tappeh Saatlu-ye Beyglar (fa)	Mound	Prehistoric	1965	Saatlu-ye Beyglar, Urmia, West Azerbaijan
449	Tappeh Angeneh (fa)	Mound	Prehistoric	1965	Angeneh, Urmia, West Azerbaijan
450	Tappeh Dizaj Tekyeh (fa)	Mound	Prehistoric	1965	Dizaj Tekyeh, Urmia, West Azerbaijan
451	Tappeh Barveh (fa)	Mound	Prehistoric	1965	Barveh, Sardasht, West Azerbaijan
452	Tappeh Rabat (fa)	Mound	Prehistoric	1965	Rabat, Urmia, West Azerbaijan
453	Tappeh Hangravan (fa)	Mound	Prehistoric	1965	Hangravan, Urmia, West Azerbaijan
454	Tappeh Segord (fa)	Mound	Prehistoric	1965	Zangabad, Piranshahr, West Azerbaijan
455	Tappeh Sabzali (fa)	Mound	Prehistoric	1965	Baranduz, Urmia, West Azerbaijan
456	Tappeh Tupuzabad (fa)	Mound	Prehistoric	1965	Tupuzabad, Urmia, West Azerbaijan
457	Tappeh Bayat (fa)	Mound	Prehistoric	1965	Bayat, Urmia, West Azerbaijan
458	Tappeh Balanej (fa)	Mound	Prehistoric	1965	Balanej, Urmia, West Azerbaijan
459					
460	Tappeh Sembatan (fa)	Mound	Prehistoric	1965	Baranduz, Urmia, West Azerbaijan
461	Tappeh Nergi (fa)	Mound	Prehistoric	1965	Nergi, Urmia, West Azerbaijan
462	Tappeh Jolbar (fa)	Mound	Prehistoric	1965	Jolbar, Urmia, West Azerbaijan
463	Kol Kharabeh Castle	Ruins	1st millennium BC	1965	Firuzian, Urmia, West Azerbaijan
464					
465	Tappeh Samartu (fa)	Mound	Prehistoric	1965	Samartu, Urmia, West Azerbaijan
466					
467	Tappeh Molla Ahmad (fa)	Mound	Prehistoric	1965	Oshnavieh, West Azerbaijan
468	Tappeh Suja (fa)	Mound	Prehistoric	1965	Oshnavieh, West Azerbaijan
469	Tappeh Gerdegeh Gol (fa)	Mound	Prehistoric	1965	Gerdegeh Gol, Oshnavieh, West Azerbaijan
470					
471	Tappeh Hasanali Banu (fa)	Mound	Prehistoric	1965	Oshnavieh, West Azerbaijan
472	Tappeh Hasanabad (fa)	Mound	Prehistoric	1965	Hasanabad, Oshnavieh, West Azerbaijan
473	Tappeh Kandvaneh (fa)	Mound	Prehistoric	1965	Oshnavieh, West Azerbaijan
474	Tappeh Moza (fa)	Mound	Prehistoric	1965	Oshnavieh, West Azerbaijan
475	Dinkha Tappeh (fa)	Mound	Prehistoric	1965	Oshnavieh, West Azerbaijan
476	Tappeh Dilanchi Arkhi (fa)	Mound	Prehistoric	1965	Dilanchi Arkhi, Naqadeh, West Azerbaijan
477	Tappeh Guik (fa)	Mound	Prehistoric	1965	Guik, Naqadeh, West Azerbaijan
478	Tappeh Qalehlar (fa)	Mound	Prehistoric	1965	Qalehlar, Naqadeh, West Azerbaijan
479	Tappeh Mirabad (fa)	Mound	Prehistoric	1965	Mirabad, Naqadeh, West Azerbaijan
480	Tappeh Momlu (fa)	Mound	Prehistoric	1965	Momlu, Naqadeh, West Azerbaijan
481	Tappeh Mohammad Shah (fa)	Mound	Prehistoric	1965	Mohammad Shah, Naqadeh, West Azerbaijan
482					
483	Tappeh Nezamabad (fa)	Mound	Prehistoric	1965	Nezamabad, Naqadeh, West Azerbaijan
484	Tappeh Zharabad (fa)	Mound	Prehistoric	1965	Zharabad, Urmia, West Azerbaijan
485	Tappeh Hasanlu	Mound	Prehistoric	1965	Hasanlu, Naqadeh, West Azerbaijan
486	Tappeh Saralan (fa)	Mound	Prehistoric	1965	Saralan, Urmia, West Azerbaijan
487	Chogha Mish	Mound	Prehistoric	1965	Choghamish, Dezful, Khuzestan
488	Godin Tappeh (fa)	Mound	Prehistoric	1965	Godin, Kangavar, Kermanshahan
489	Tappeh Kelar	Mound	Prehistoric	1965	Kelardasht, Chalus, Mazandaran
490	Tal-e Eblis (fa)	Mound	Prehistoric	1965	Dashtkar, Bardsir, Kerman
491	Emamzadeh Mohammad (fa)	Emamzadeh	Ilkhanate Era	1966	Bardsir, Kerman
492	Tappeh Aliabad (fa)	Mound	Prehistoric	1966	Aliabad, Bardsir, Kerman
493	Tappeh Aliabad-e Sarband (fa)	Mound	Prehistoric	1966	Bardsir, Kerman
494	Tappeh Shileh Gorgi A (fa)	Mound	Prehistoric	1966	Bardsir, Kerman
495	Tappeh Dashtkar (fa)	Mound	Prehistoric	1966	Dashtkar, Bardsir, Kerman
496	Tappeh Moghu (fa)	Mound	Prehistoric	1966	Moghuiyeh, Rafsanjan, Kerman
497	Dezh-e Meymandi Cemetery (fa)	Cemetery	Prehistoric	1966	Meymand, Shahr-e Babak, Kerman
498	Qahqah Castle	Ruins	Sasanian Era	1966	Deh-e Shib, Ravar, Kerman
499	Tappeh Vaziri (fa)	Mound	Prehistoric	1966	Deh-e Shib, Ravar, Kerman
500	Tappeh Qaleh-ye Langar (fa)	Mound	Prehistoric	1966	Langar, Kerman, Kerman

=== No. 501 to 750 ===
Reg. no.	Name	Category	Historic Era	Reg. date	Location
501	Tappeh Yelengi (fa)	Mound	Prehistoric	1966	Langar, Kerman, Kerman
502					
503	Shahr-e Daqianus (fa) (fa)	Archaeological Site	Prehistoric	1966	Jiroft, Kerman
504					
505	Tappeh Saruni (fa)	Mound	Prehistoric	1966	Saruni, Jiroft, Kerman
506	Tappeh Tom Gavan (fa)	Mound	Prehistoric	1966	Tom Gavan, Jiroft, Kerman
507	Tappeh Vakil Aqa (fa)	Mound	Prehistoric	1966	Dehnow, Jiroft, Kerman
508	Tappeh Abbasabad (fa)	Mound	Prehistoric	1966	Abbasabad, Jiroft, Kerman
509	Tappeh Konar Sandal A (fa)	Mound	Prehistoric	1966	Konar Sandal, Jiroft, Kerman
510	Tappeh Konar Sandal B (fa)	Mound	Prehistoric	1966	Konar Sandal, Jiroft, Kerman
511	Tappeh Anbarabad (fa)	Mound	Prehistoric	1966	Anbarabad, Kerman
512	Tappeh Ebrahimabad (fa)	Mound	Prehistoric	1966	Ebrahimabad, Jiroft, Kerman
513	Tappeh Qaleh Kuchak (fa)	Mound	Prehistoric	1966	Konar Sandal, Jiroft, Kerman
514	Tappeh Mokhtarabad (fa)	Mound	Prehistoric	1966	Mokhtarabad, Rudbar-e Jonubi, Kerman
515	Tappeh Konar (fa)	Mound	Prehistoric	1966	Mian Deh, Jiroft, Kerman
516	Tappeh Darui (fa)	Mound	Prehistoric	1966	Daruiyeh, Jiroft, Kerman
517	Tappeh Nurabad (fa)	Mound	Prehistoric	1966	Nurabad, Jiroft, Kerman
518	Tappeh Kam Sorkh (fa)	Mound	Prehistoric	1966	Saidabad, Kahnuj, Kerman
519	Qal'eh Dokhtar	Castle	Sasanian Era	1966	Kerman, Kerman
520	Rayen Castle	Castle	Prehistoric	1966	Rayen, Kerman
521	Tappeh Hezar Mardi (fa)	Mound	Prehistoric	1966	Mozaffarabad, Kerman, Kerman
522	Tappeh Pahan (fa)	Mound	Prehistoric	1966	Mokhtarabad, Kerman, Kerman
523					
524	Ardashir Castle (fa)	Castle	Sasanian Era	1966	Kerman, Kerman
525					
526	Ebrahim Khan Madraseh (fa) (fa)	Madraseh	Qajar Era	1966	Kerman, Kerman
527	Aqa Ali Mosque	Mosque	Qajar Era	1966	Kerman, Kerman
528	Mausoleum of Akhund (fa)	Mausoleum	Safavid Era	1966	Kuhbanan, Kerman
529	Emamzadeh Hossein (fa) (fa)	Emamzadeh	Safavid Era	1966	Jupar, Kerman
530	Emamzadeh Mohammad (fa)	Emamzadeh	Ilkhanate Era	1966	Shahdad, Kerman
531	Mausoleum of Baba Mosafer (fa)	Mausoleum	Safavid Era	1966	Shahdad, Kerman
532	Mausoleum of Amir Heydar (fa)	Mausoleum	Safavid Era	1966	Dowlatabad, Jiroft, Kerman
533	Tappeh Shileh Gorgi B (fa)	Mound	Prehistoric	1966	Bardsir, Kerman
534	Emamzadeh Ali (fa) (fa)	Emamzadeh	Timurid Era	1966	Shiraz, Fars
536	Tappeh Karku (fa)	Mound	Prehistoric	1966	Karku, Hirmand, Sistan and Baluchestan
537	Bibi Doust Castle (fa)	Ruins	Arsacid Era	1966	Bonjar, Hirmand, Sistan and Baluchestan
537	Zahedan-e Kohneh (fa)	Ruins	Sasanian Era	1966	Zehak, Sistan and Baluchestan
538	Timur Castle	Ruins	Timurid Era	1966	Zabol, Sistan and Baluchestan
539					
540					
541	Sar Castle (fa)	Ruins	Arsacid Era	1966	Sekuheh (fa), Hamun, Sistan and Baluchestan
542	Shahr-e Sukhteh	Ancient City	Prehistoric	1966	Mohammadabad, Hamun, Sistan and Baluchestan
543	Tappeh Shahr-e Sukhteh (fa)	Mound	Prehistoric	1966	Mohammadabad, Hamun, Sistan and Baluchestan
544	Tappeh Tasuki (fa)	Mound	Prehistoric	1966	Tasuki, Hamun, Sistan and Baluchestan
545	Tappeh Rubahak (fa)	Mound	Prehistoric	1966	Dezak (fa), Saravan, Sistan and Baluchestan
546					
547	Tappeh Mahtab Khazaneh (fa)	Mound	Prehistoric	1966	Kuhak, Saravan, Sistan and Baluchestan
548	Gosht Cemetery (fa)	Cemetery	Arsacid Era	1966	Gosht, Saravan, Sistan and Baluchestan
549	Tappeh Kalatak Bakhshan (fa)	Mound	Prehistoric	1966	Kalatak (fa), Saravan, Sistan and Baluchestan
550	Tappeh Mil Maru (fa)	Mound	Prehistoric	1966	Saravan, Sistan and Baluchestan
551	Tappeh Borzad (fa)	Mound	Prehistoric	1966	Sib and Suran, Sistan and Baluchestan
552	Tappeh Qaleh Molla (fa)	Mound	Prehistoric	1966	Sib (fa), Sib and Suran, Sistan and Baluchestan
553	Tappeh Pir Kahurth (fa)	Mound	Prehistoric	1966	Sib, Sib and Suran, Sistan and Baluchestan
554	Tappeh Pir Kahurd (fa)	Mound	Prehistoric	1966	Sib, Sib and Suran, Sistan and Baluchestan
555	Tis Castle	Castle	Safavid Era	1966	Tis, Chabahar, Sistan and Baluchestan
556	Tappeh Dombigan (fa)	Mound	Prehistoric	1966	Qasr-e Qand, Sistan and Baluchestan
557	Tappeh Siahbun (fa)	Mound	Prehistoric	1966	Qasr-e Qand, Sistan and Baluchestan
558	Tappeh Ja-Dokhtaran (fa)	Mound	Prehistoric	1966	Nikshahr, Sistan and Baluchestan
559	Bampur Castle	Castle	Sasanian Era	1966	Bampur, Sistan and Baluchestan
560	Tappeh Cheshmeh (fa)	Mound	Prehistoric	1966	Aliabad, Marvdasht, Fars
561	Zardeh Castle (fa)	Ruins	Sasanian Era	1967	Zardeh, Dalahu, Kermanshahan
562					
563	Gach Gonbad (fa)	Ruins	Sasanian Era	1967	Baba Yadegar (fa), Dalahu, Kermanshahan
564	Tappeh Tabani (fa)	Mound	Prehistoric	1967	Bukan, West Azerbaijan
565	Tappeh Asiab Kohneh (fa)	Mound	Prehistoric	1967	Bukan, West Azerbaijan
566	Tappeh Kelk Abi (fa)	Mound	Prehistoric	1967	Bukan, West Azerbaijan
567	Tappeh Sheikhan Kuchak (fa)	Mound	Prehistoric	1967	Bukan, West Azerbaijan
568	Tappeh Sheikhan Bozorg (fa)	Mound	Prehistoric	1967	Bukan, West Azerbaijan
569	Tappeh Mujeh (fa)	Mound	Prehistoric	1967	Bukan, West Azerbaijan
570	Sardar Castle demolished in 1983	Castle	Qajar Era	1967	Bukan, West Azerbaijan
571	Qalay Tappeh (fa)	Mound	Prehistoric	1967	Bukan, West Azerbaijan
572	Tappeh Albolagh (fa)	Mound	Prehistoric	1967	Albolagh, Bukan, West Azerbaijan
573	Tappeh Qareh Kand (fa)	Mound	Prehistoric	1967	Qareh Kand, Bukan, West Azerbaijan
574	Tappeh Ruzhbiani (fa)	Mound	Prehistoric	1967	Bukan, West Azerbaijan
575	Tappeh Darbesar (fa)	Mound	Prehistoric	1967	Darbesar, Bukan, West Azerbaijan
576	Tappeh Jarreh (fa)	Mound	Prehistoric	1967	Bukan, West Azerbaijan
577	Qareh Tappeh (fa)	Mound	Prehistoric	1967	Bukan, West Azerbaijan
578	Sharbat Tappeh (fa)	Mound	Prehistoric	1967	Nazlu, Urmia, West Azerbaijan
579	Tappeh Khalikeh (fa)	Mound	Prehistoric	1967	Bukan, West Azerbaijan
580	Tappeh Khazineh (fa)	Mound	Prehistoric	1967	Bukan, West Azerbaijan
581	Tappeh Shinabad (fa)	Mound	Prehistoric	1967	Shinabad, Piranshahr, West Azerbaijan
582	Tappeh Ashi (fa)	Mound	Prehistoric	1967	Shimineh, Bukan, West Azerbaijan
583	Kelk Tappeh (fa)	Mound	Prehistoric	1967	Bukan, West Azerbaijan
584	Tappeh Rahim Khan (fa)	Mound	Prehistoric	1967	Rahim Khan, Bukan, West Azerbaijan
585	Tappeh Mahmud (fa)	Mound	Prehistoric	1967	Bukan, West Azerbaijan
586	Tappeh Osman Qareh (fa)	Mound	Prehistoric	1967	Bukan, West Azerbaijan
587	Tappeh Kani Guzleh (fa)	Mound	Prehistoric	1967	Kani Guzleh, Bukan, West Azerbaijan
588	Tappeh Uzun Qeshlaq (fa)	Mound	Prehistoric	1967	Uzun Qeshlaq, Bukan, West Azerbaijan
589	Tappeh Nachit (fa)	Mound	Prehistoric	1967	Nachit, Bukan, West Azerbaijan
590	Tappeh Kuzekhaneh (fa)	Mound	Prehistoric	1967	Bukan, West Azerbaijan
591	Tappeh Maqsud (fa)	Mound	Prehistoric	1967	Bukan, West Azerbaijan
592	Tappeh Abdollah (fa)	Mound	Prehistoric	1967	Abdollah Tappehsi, Bukan, West Azerbaijan
593	Tappeh Malan (fa)	Mound	Prehistoric	1967	Bukan, West Azerbaijan
594	Tappeh Arablu (fa)	Mound	Prehistoric	1967	Bukan, West Azerbaijan
595					
596	Tappeh Aski Baghdad (fa)	Mound	Prehistoric	1967	Aski Baghdad, Bukan, West Azerbaijan
597	Tappeh Sombeh (fa)	Mound	Prehistoric	1967	Bukan, West Azerbaijan
598	Tappeh Darvishan (fa)	Mound	Prehistoric	1967	Darvishan, Bukan, West Azerbaijan
599	Tappeh Il Teymur (fa)	Mound	Prehistoric	1967	Il Teymur, Mahabad, West Azerbaijan
600	Tappeh Qalehjuq (fa)	Mound	Prehistoric	1967	Qalehjuq, Mahabad, West Azerbaijan
601	Tappeh Dashkesan (fa)	Mound	Prehistoric	1967	Bukan, West Azerbaijan
602	Tappeh Rabat	Mound	Prehistoric	1967	Rabat, Sardasht, West Azerbaijan
603	Vakil Madraseh (fa)	Madraseh	Zand Era	1967	Shiraz, Fars
604	Tappeh Segordan (fa)	Mound	Prehistoric	1967	Zangabad, Piranshahr, West Azerbaijan
605	Tappeh Qojiabad (fa)	Mound	Prehistoric	1967	Qojiabad, Mahabad, West Azerbaijan
606	Tappeh Kikabad (fa)	Mound	Prehistoric	1967	Kikabad, Mahabad, West Azerbaijan
607	Tappeh Tekanlujeh (fa)	Mound	Prehistoric	1967	Tekanlujeh, Mahabad, West Azerbaijan
608	Tappeh Deryaz (fa)	Mound	Prehistoric	1967	Deryaz, Mahabad, West Azerbaijan
609	Tappeh Bagh-e Shaygan (fa) destroyed recently	Mound	Prehistoric	1967	Mahabad, West Azerbaijan
610	Tappeh Qalat Shinabad (fa)	Mound	Prehistoric	1967	Shinabad, Piranshahr, West Azerbaijan
611	Tappeh Mutabad (fa)	Mound	Prehistoric	1967	Mutabad, Piranshahr, West Azerbaijan
612	Tappeh Gerd Ashvan (fa)	Mound	Prehistoric	1967	Gerd Ashvan, Piranshahr, West Azerbaijan
613	Tappeh Jaldian (fa)	Mound	Prehistoric	1967	Jaldian, Piranshahr, West Azerbaijan
614	Tappeh Marqad (fa)	Mound	Prehistoric	1967	Piranshahr, West Azerbaijan
615	Tappeh Gurkhaneh (fa)	Mound	Prehistoric	1967	Gurkhaneh, Naqadeh, West Azerbaijan
616	Emamzadeh Mohammad (fa) (fa)	Emamzadeh	Safavid Era	1967	Mashhad, Razavi Khorasan
617	Emamzadeh Hashem	Emamzadeh	Safavid Era	1967	Kotel Emamzadeh Hashem, Amol Mazandaran
618	Kohnenh Qaleh (fa)	Castle	Sasanian Era	1967	Meshginshahr, Ardabil
619	Meshginshahr Inscription (fa) (fa)	Inscription	Sasanian Era	1967	Meshginshahr, Ardabil
620	Tappeh Mir Alilu (fa)	Mound	Prehistoric	1967	Mir Alilu, Meshginshahr, Ardabil
621					
622	Shah Tappeh (fa)	Mound	Prehistoric	1967	Shah Tappeh, Germi, Ardabil
623	Babak Castle	Castle	Sasanian Era	1967	Shojaabad, Kaleybar, East Azerbaijan
624	Tappeh Aqamal (fa)	Mound	Prehistoric	1967	Shekarlu, Germi, Ardabil
625	Tappeh Naqareh (fa)	Mound	Prehistoric	1967	Naqareh, Germi, Ardabil
626	Tappeh Hacha (fa)	Mound	Prehistoric	1967	Hachakand, Germi, Ardabil
627	Tappeh Matlab (fa)	Mound	Prehistoric	1967	Takanlu, Germi, Ardabil
628	Naqduz Castle	Castle	Sasanian Era	1967	Shojaabad, Ahar, East Azerbaijan
629	Dokhtar Castle (fa)	Castle	Sasanian Era	1967	Qiz Qalesi, Bileh Savar, Ardabil
630	Div Castle (fa)	Castle	Achaemenid Era	1967	Kavich, Meshginshahr, Ardabil
631	Kul Tappeh (fa)	Mound	Prehistoric	1967	Haj Ahmad Kandi, Germi, Ardabil
632	Tappeh Amirkhanlu (fa)	Mound	Prehistoric	1967	Meshginshahr, Ardabil
633	Kul Tappeh (fa)	Mound	Prehistoric	1967	Gudeh Kahriz, Meshginshahr, Ardabil
634	Baba Mahmud Bridge (fa)	Bridge	Ilkhanate Era	1967	Sohr Firuzan, Falavarjan, Isfahan
635	Tappeh Qanbar (fa)	Mound	Prehistoric	1967	Onar, Meshginshahr, Ardabil
636	Tappeh Kharman (fa)	Mound	Prehistoric	1967	Amestan, Germi, Ardabil
637	Tappeh Salaleh (fa)	Mound	Prehistoric	1967	Salaleh, Germi, Ardabil
638					
639	Tappeh Pileh Daraq (fa)	Mound	Prehistoric	1967	Pileh Daraq, Germi, Ardabil
640	Tappeh Dehkadeh (fa)	Mound	Prehistoric	1967	Tappeh, Germi, Ardabil
641	Mausoleum of Fakhreddin (fa)	Mausoleum	Timurid Era	1967	Babol, Mazandaran
642	Emamzadeh Seyyed (fa) (fa)	Emamzadeh	Ilkhanate Era	1967	Golpaygan, Isfahan
643	Moezzeddin Mosque (fa)	Mosque	Safavid Era	1967	Maragheh, East Azerbaijan
644	Gonbad-e Baz (fa)	Monument	Safavid Era	1967	Natanz, Isfahan
645	Mausoleum of Abolhassan Kharaqani	Mausoleum	Ilkhanate Era	1967	Qaleh Now, Shahrud, Semnan
646	Mausoleum of Shamseddin (fa)	Mausoleum	Safavid Era	1967	Lahijan, Gilan
647	Pamenar Mosque	Mosque	Early Islamic Era	1967	Sabzevar, Razavi Khorasan
648	Eshratabad Palace (fa)	Palace	Qajar Era	1967	Tehran, Tehran
649					
650	Gonbad-e Zanguleh (fa)	Mausoleum	Ilkhanate Era	1967	Damghan, Semnan
651	Chahak Castle (fa)	Castle	Early Islamic Era	1967	Chahak, Mashhad, Razavi Khorasan
652	Mazdavand Cave (fa)	Archaeological Site	Prehistoric	1967	Mazdavand, Sarakhs, Razavi Khorasan
653	Tappeh Castle (fa)	Ruins	Early Islamic Era	1967	Mazdavand, Sarakhs, Razavi Khorasan
654	Gonbadli Castle (fa)	Ruins	Early Islamic Era	1967	Gonbadli, Sarakhs, Razavi Khorasan
655	Tappeh Firuzeh (fa)	Mound	Prehistoric	1967	Gonbadli, Sarakhs, Razavi Khorasan
656	Shir Tappeh (fa)	Mound	Prehistoric	1967	Shir Tappeh, Sarakhs, Razavi Khorasan
657	Tappeh Kandakli (fa)	Mound	Prehistoric	1967	Kandakli, Sarakhs, Razavi Khorasan
658	Bazangan Castle (fa)	Castle	Afsharid Era	1967	Bazangan, Sarakhs, Razavi Khorasan
659	Bazangan Cave (fa)	Archaeological Site	Prehistoric	1967	Bazangan, Sarakhs, Razavi Khorasan
660	Naderi Dam (fa)	Dam	Afsharid Era	1967	Kalat, Razavi Khorasan
661	Kabud Gonbad Mosque	Mosque	Seljuk Era	1967	Kalat, Razavi Khorasan
662	Kalat Watchtowers (fa)	Watchtower	Afsharid Era	1967	Kalat, Razavi Khorasan
663	Khesht Cisterns (fa)	Cistern	Afsharid Era	1967	Khesht-e Nadari, Kalat, Razavi Khorasan
664	Darband Nafti (fa)	Fortification	Afsharid Era	1967	Kalat, Razavi Khorasan
665	Darband Arghunshah (fa)	Fortification	Afsharid Era	1967	Kalat, Razavi Khorasan
666	Dehcheh Gate (fa)	Gate	Afsharid Era	1967	Kalat, Razavi Khorasan
667	Chub-Bast Gate (fa)	Gate	Afsharid Era	1967	Kalat, Razavi Khorasan
668	Gashtaneh Gate (fa)	Gate	Afsharid Era	1967	Kalat, Razavi Khorasan
669	Tappeh Takht-e Dokhtar (fa)	Mound	Prehistoric	1967	Garu, Kalat, Razavi Khorasan
670	Forud Castle	Castle	Afsharid Era	1967	Kalat, Razavi Khorasan
671	Tappeh Shamsi Khan (fa)	Mound	Prehistoric	1967	Shamsi Khan, Dargaz, Razavi Khorasan
672	Tappeh Qazan Beyk (fa)	Mound	Prehistoric	1967	Qazan Beyk, Dargaz, Razavi Khorasan
673	Tappeh Tafi (fa)	Mound	Prehistoric	1967	Komaj Khwor, Dargaz, Razavi Khorasan
674	Tappeh Saheb Jan (fa)	Mound	Prehistoric	1967	Dargaz, Razavi Khorasan
675					
676	Tappeh Artian (fa)	Mound	Prehistoric	1967	Artian, Dargaz, Razavi Khorasan
677	Tappeh Owlia (fa)	Mound	Prehistoric	1967	Dargaz, Razavi Khorasan
678					
679	Tappeh Telki (fa)	Mound	Prehistoric	1967	Dargaz, Razavi Khorasan
680	Tappeh Khwancheh (fa)	Mound	Prehistoric	1967	Khwancheh, Dargaz, Razavi Khorasan
681	Tappeh Kalat Khwancheh (fa)	Mound	Prehistoric	1967	Khwancheh, Dargaz, Razavi Khorasan
682	Tappeh Yukhar Qaleh (fa)	Mound	Prehistoric	1967	Qareh Quyunlu, Dargaz, Razavi Khorasan
683	Tappeh Pasgah (fa)	Mound	Prehistoric	1967	Dargaz, Razavi Khorasan
684	Tappeh Zubaran (fa)	Mound	Prehistoric	1967	Zubaran, Quchan, Razavi Khorasan
685	Tappeh Forudgah-e Quchan (fa)	Mound	Prehistoric	1967	Quchan, Razavi Khorasan
686	Tappeh Padegan-e Quchan (fa)	Mound	Prehistoric	1967	Quchan, Razavi Khorasan
687	Tappeh Jelighasi (fa)	Mound	Prehistoric	1967	Quchan, Razavi Khorasan
688	Tappeh Suzani (fa)	Mound	Prehistoric	1967	Quchan, Razavi Khorasan
689	Old City of Quchan (fa)	Old City	Early Islamic Era	1967	Quchan, Razavi Khorasan
690	Tappeh Hokmabad (fa)	Mound	Prehistoric	1967	Quchan, Razavi Khorasan
691	Tappeh Daghian Bozorg (fa)	Mound	Prehistoric	1967	Daghian, Quchan, Razavi Khorasan
692	Tappeh Daghian Kuchak (fa)	Mound	Prehistoric	1967	Daghian, Quchan, Razavi Khorasan
693	Tappeh Kholqabad (fa)	Mound	Prehistoric	1967	Faruj, North Khorasan
694	Golur Tappeh (fa)	Mound	Prehistoric	1967	Bargard, Faruj, North Khorasan
695	Tappeh Chaki (fa)	Mound	Prehistoric	1967	Najafabad, Faruj, North Khorasan
696	Tappeh Tavil (fa)	Mound	Prehistoric	1967	Akbarabad, Faruj, North Khorasan
697	Devin Tappeh (fa)	Mound	Prehistoric	1967	Devin, Shirvan, North Khorasan
698	Tappeh Gabrkhaneh (fa)	Mound	Prehistoric	1967	Shirvan, North Khorasan
699	Tappeh Borzolabad (fa)	Mound	Prehistoric	1967	Borzolabad, Shirvan, North Khorasan
700					
701					
702	Golur Tappeh (fa)	Mound	Prehistoric	1967	Faruj, North Khorasan
703	Tappeh Arg (fa)	Mound	Prehistoric	1967	Shirvan, North Khorasan
704	Emamzadeh Hamzeh Reza (fa)	Emamzadeh	Ilkhanate Era	1967	Shirvan, North Khorasan
705	Tappeh Mansureh (fa)	Mound	Prehistoric	1967	Mansuran, Shirvan, North Khorasan
706	Tappeh Ziarat (fa)	Mound	Prehistoric	1967	Ziarat, Shirvan, North Khorasan
707	Tappeh Bolbol (fa)	Mound	Prehistoric	1967	Shirvan, North Khorasan
708					
709	Tappeh Sansalabad (fa)	Mound	Prehistoric	1967	Hamzanlu, Bojnurd, North Khorasan
710	Tappeh Tatar-e Payin (fa)	Mound	Prehistoric	1967	Tatar, Bojnurd, North Khorasan
711	Tappeh Tatar-e Bala (fa)	Mound	Prehistoric	1967	Tatar, Bojnurd, North Khorasan
712	Gholanreza Tappeh (fa)	Mound	Prehistoric	1967	Bojnurd, North Khorasan
713	Tappeh Zaman Beyk (fa)	Mound	Prehistoric	1967	Bojnurd, North Khorasan
714					
715	Serivan Tappeh (fa)	Mound	Prehistoric	1967	Serivan Tappeh, Bojnurd, North Khorasan
716					
717	Tappeh Shabandar (fa)	Mound	Prehistoric	1967	Kerik, Maneh and Samalqan, North Khorasan
718	Tappeh Shahabad (fa)	Mound	Prehistoric	1967	Shahabad, Maneh and Samalqan, North Khorasan
719	Tappeh Biar (fa)	Mound	Prehistoric	1967	Biar-e Kord, Maneh and Samalqan, North Khorasan
720	Rubah Tappeh (fa)	Mound	Prehistoric	1967	Najaf, Maneh and Samalqan, North Khorasan
721	Tappeh Qareh Mosalla (fa)	Mound	Prehistoric	1967	Qareh Mosalla, Maneh and Samalqan, North Khorasan
722	Tappeh Lakhi (fa)	Mound	Prehistoric	1967	Molla Hassan, Maneh and Samalqan, North Khorasan
723	Tappeh Delavar (fa)	Mound	Prehistoric	1967	Najaf, Maneh and Samalqan, North Khorasan
724	Tappeh Yekkeh Chenar (fa)	Mound	Prehistoric	1967	Yekkeh Chenar, Maraveh Tappeh, Golestan
725	Maraveh Tappeh (fa)	Mound	Prehistoric	1967	Maraveh Tappeh, Golestan
726					
727	Tappeh Gonbad (fa)	Mound	Prehistoric	1967	Gonbad-e Kavus, Golestan
728					
729	Tappeh Nezamabad-e Payin (fa)	Mound	Prehistoric	1967	Nezamabad, Shah Pasand, Golestan
730	Tappeh Nezamabad-e Bala (fa)	Mound	Prehistoric	1967	Nezamabad, Shah Pasand, Golestan
731	Tappeh Ruzeh (fa)	Mound	Prehistoric	1967	Shah Pasand, Golestan
732	Tappeh Sanjaran (fa)	Mound	Prehistoric	1967	Shah Pasand, Golestan
733	Tappeh Ruzeh II (fa)	Mound	Prehistoric	1967	Shah Pasand, Golestan
734	Seh Tappeh (fa)	Mound	Prehistoric	1967	Khan Bebin, Ramian, Golestan
735	Do Tappeh (fa)	Mound	Prehistoric	1967	Aliabad-e Katul, Golestan
736	Yas Tappeh (fa)	Mound	Prehistoric	1967	Aliabad-e Katul, Golestan
737	Narges Tappeh (fa)	Mound	Prehistoric	1967	Aliabad, Gorgan, Golestan
738	Tappeh Qoli (fa)	Mound	Prehistoric	1967	Aliabad, Gorgan, Golestan
739	Tappeh Saadabad (fa)	Mound	Prehistoric	1967	Saadabad, Gorgan, Golestan
740	Tappeh Lamsak (fa)	Mound	Prehistoric	1967	Lamsak, Gorgan, Golestan
741	Tappeh Mohammadabad (fa)	Mound	Prehistoric	1967	Mohammadabad, Gorgan, Golestan
742	Tappeh Heydarabad (fa)	Mound	Prehistoric	1967	Heydarabad, Gorgan, Golestan
743	Tappeh Kafshgiri (fa)	Mound	Prehistoric	1967	Kafshgiri, Gorgan, Golestan
744					
745					
746	Hotu and Kamarband Caves	Archaeological Site	Prehistoric	1967	Torujen, Behshahr, Mazandaran
747	Tappeh Kash-e Bozorg (fa)	Mound	Prehistoric	1967	Kuhestan, Behshahr, Mazandaran
748	Tappeh Kash (fa)	Mound	Prehistoric	1967	Kuhestan, Behshahr, Mazandaran
749	Site of Stone Lion of Hamadan (fa)	Archaeological Site	Arsacid Era	1967	Hamadan, Hamadan
750	Emamzadeh Mohammad and Ebrahim (fa)	Emamzadeh	Ilkhanate Era	1967	Shahreza, Isfahan

=== No. 751 to 1000 ===
Reg. no.	Name	Category	Historic Era	Reg. date	Location
751	Tappeh Anarkul (fa)	Mound	Prehistoric	1967	Tutkabon, Rudbar, Gilan
752	Tappeh Peh Gerd (fa)	Mound	Prehistoric	1967	Anarkul, Rudbar, Gilan
753	Emamzadeh Om Kobra and Om Soghra (fa)	Emamzadeh	Safavid Era	1967	Eshtehard, Alborz
754					
755	Emamzadeh Rahman and Zeyd (fa)	Emamzadeh	Seljuk Era	1967	Palangabad, Eshtehard, Alborz
756	Emamzadeh Rahman and Zeyd (fa)	Emamzadeh	Ilkhanate Era	1967	Sohr Firuzan, Falavarjan, Isfahan
757	Bozi Castle (fa) (fa)	Ruins	Early Islamic Era	1967	Falavarjan, Isfahan
758	Mausoleum of Chehel Dokhtaran (fa)	Mausoleum	Ilkhanate Era	1967	Kashan, Isfahan
759	Holy Mary Church (fa)	Church	17th century	1967	Shiraz, Fars
760	Malek Mosque	Mosque	Seljuk Era	1967	Kerman, Kerman
761					
762	Tappeh Zivieh (fa)	Archaeological Site	1st millennium BC	1967	Zivieh, Saqqez, Kordestan
763	Tappeh Nushijan (fa) (fa)	Archaeological Site	1st millennium BC	1968	Shushab, Malayer, Hamadan
764	Tappeh Shushab (fa)	Mound	Prehistoric	1968	Shushab, Malayer, Hamadan
765	Behistun Bridge (fa)	Bridge	Safavid Era	1968	Bisotun, Harsin, Kermanshahan
766	St. John Church of Sohrol	Church	19th century	1968	Sohrol, Shabestar, East Azerbaijan
767					
768	Mausoleum of Shah Balu (fa)	Mausoleum	Timurid Era	1968	Ahudasht, Nur, Mazandaran
769	Mausoleum of Sultan Mahmud (fa) (fa)	Mausoleum	Ilkhanate Era	1968	Bondorabad, Ashkezar, Yazd
770	Ziaiyeh Madraseh (fa)	Madraseh	Ilkhanate Era	1968	Yazd, Yazd
771	Shah Vali Mosque (fa)	Mosque	Ilkhanate Era	1968	Taft, Yazd
772	Kamaliyeh Madraseh (fa)	Madraseh	Ilkhanate Era	1968	Yazd, Yazd
773	Mausoleum of Ahmad (fa)	Mausoleum	Ilkhanate Era	1968	Yazd, Yazd
774					
775	Hosseinian Madraseh (fa)	Madraseh	Ilkhanate Era	1968	Yazd, Yazd
776	Tappeh Bala Mashhad-e Zolfabad (fa)	Mound	Prehistoric	1968	Mashhad-e Zolfabad, Farahan, Markazi
777	Tappeh Payin Mashhad-e Zolfabad (fa)	Mound	Prehistoric	1968	Mashhad-e Zolfabad, Farahan, Markazi
778	St. Hripsime Church of Mujumbar	Church	17th century	1968	Mujumbar, Shabestar, East Azerbaijan
779	Qadamgah Cave (fa) (fa)	Temple	Prehistoric	1968	Badamyar, Azarshahr, East Azerbaijan
780	Qadamgah Cemetery (fa)	Cemetery	Timurid Era	1968	Badamyar, Azarshahr, East Azerbaijan
781	Tasuj Friday Mosque (fa)	Friday Mosque	Safavid Era	1968	Tasuj, East Azerbaijan
782	Pirlar Cemetery (fa)	Cemetery	Safavid Era	1968	Shiramin, Azarshahr, East Azerbaijan
783	Tappeh Shiramin (fa)	Mound	Prehistoric	1968	Shiramin, Azarshahr, East Azerbaijan
784	Tappeh Pir Musa (fa)	Mound	Prehistoric	1968	Sahlan, Tabriz, East Azerbaijan
785	Tappeh Baruj (fa)	Mound	Prehistoric	1968	Baruj, Marand, East Azerbaijan
786	Tappeh Yaldur (fa)	Mound	Prehistoric	1968	Marand, East Azerbaijan
787	Tappeh Gargar (fa)	Mound	Prehistoric	1968	Gargar, East Azerbaijan
788	Mausoleum of Molla Masum (fa)	Mausoleum	Timurid Era	1968	Varjovi, Maragheh, East Azerbaijan
789	Mehrabad Friday Mosque	Friday Mosque	Safavid Era	1968	Bonab, East Azerbaijan
790	Maragheh Inscription (fa) (fa)	Inscription	Timurid Era	1968	Maragheh, East Azerbaijan
791	Razliq Inscription (fa)	Inscription	Urartu Era	1968	Razliq, Sarab, East Azerbaijan
792	Nashteban Inscription (fa)	Inscription	Urartu Era	1968	Nashteban, Sarab, East Azerbaijan
793	Tappeh Qalehjuq (fa)	Mound	Prehistoric	1968	Qalehjuq, Sarab, East Azerbaijan
794	Aghmiun Fire Temple (fa)	Fire Temple	Sasanian Era	1968	Aghmiun, Sarab, East Azerbaijan
795	Saghandel Inscription (fa)	Inscription	Urartu Era	1968	Saghandel, Varzaqan, East Azerbaijan
796	Tappeh Naderi (fa)	Mound	Prehistoric	1968	Aslanduz, Ardabil
797	Sarab Friday Mosque	Friday Mosque	Timurid Era	1968	Sarab, East Azerbaijan
798	Tappeh Abarghan (fa)	Mound	Prehistoric	1968	Abarghan, Sarab, East Azerbaijan
799	Qarlujeh Tower (fa)	Mausoleum	Timurid Era	1968	Qarlujeh, Kaleybar, East Azerbaijan
800	Tappeh Emam Chay (fa)	Mound	Prehistoric	1968	Emam Chay, Sarab, East Azerbaijan
801					
802					
803	Farhad Rock Tomb (fa) (fa)	Rock Tomb	Urartu Era	1968	Sangar, Maku, West Azerbaijan
804	Pir Ahmad Kandi Cemetery (fa)	Cemetery	Sasanian Era	1968	Pir Ahmad Kandi, Chaldoran, West Azerbaijan
805	Tappeh Moghanjuq (fa)	Mound	Prehistoric	1968	Moghanjuq, Salmas, West Azerbaijan
806	Hadar Rock Tomb (fa)	Rock Tomb	Urartu Era	1968	Hadar, Salmas, West Azerbaijan
807	Tappeh Khezerlu (fa) (fa)	Mound	Prehistoric	1968	Khezerlu, Shot, West Azerbaijan
808	Stone Gate (fa)	Gate	Ilkhanate Era	1968	Khoy, West Azerbaijan
809	Kohneh Shahr Ruins (fa)	Ruins	Early Islamic Era	1968	Kohneh Shahr, Salmas, West Azerbaijan
810	Qarni Yarikh Rock Tomb (fa)	Rock Tomb	Urartu Era	1968	Malham, Salmas, West Azerbaijan
811	Qalatgah Castle (fa)	Ruins	Urartu Era	1968	Cheshmeh Gol, Oshnavieh, West Azerbaijan
812	Scythian Tumulus (fa)	Tumulus	1st millennium BC	1968	Naqadeh, West Azerbaijan
813	Tappeh Taban (fa)	Mound	Prehistoric	1968	Salmas, West Azerbaijan
814	Tappeh Sari Qamish (fa)	Mound	Prehistoric	1968	Sari Qamish, Bukan, West Azerbaijan
815	Gog Tappeh (fa)	Mound	Prehistoric	1968	Gog Tappeh, Miandoab, West Azerbaijan
816					
817	Chal Tappeh (fa)	Mound	Prehistoric	1968	Shahin Dezh, West Azerbaijan
818					
819	Tappeh Sheytan Takhti (fa)	Mound	Prehistoric	1968	Yengi Orkh, Shahin Dezh, West Azerbaijan
820	Tappeh Kashavar (fa)	Mound	Prehistoric	1968	Kashavar, Shahin Dezh, West Azerbaijan
821	Tappeh Cheragh Baba (fa)	Mound	Prehistoric	1968	Shahin Dezh, West Azerbaijan
822	St. Sarkis Church of Khoy	Church	12th century	1968	Khoy, West Azerbaijan
823	Emamzadeh Mohsen (fa)	Emamzadeh	Safavid Era	1968	Vafrejin, Hamadan, Hamadan
824	Mausoleum of Zahed Gilani (fa)	Mausoleum	Timurid Era	1968	Sheykhanbar, Lahijan, Gilan
825	Rahnan Hammam (fa)	Hammam	Safavid Era	1968	Isfahan, Isfahan
826	Mausoleum of Kuraim (fa)	Mausoleum	Early Islamic Era	1968	Kuraim, Nir, Ardabil
827	Ramuk Kiosk (fa)	Kiosk	Early Islamic Era	1968	Shahdad, Kerman
828	Ramuk Castle	Castle	Early Islamic Era	1968	Shahdad, Kerman
829	Ganjali Khan Complex	Complex	Safavid Era	1968	Kerman, Kerman
830	Cheshmeh Ali (fa)	Persian Garden	Timurid Era	1969	Damghan, Semnan
831	Tapani Cave (fa)	Archaeological Site	Prehistoric	1969	Tapani, Sarpol-e Zahab, Kermanshahan
832	Tappeh Sarab-e Zehab (fa)	Mound	Prehistoric	1969	Sarab-e Zehab, Sarpol-e Zahab, Kermanshahan
833	Manijeh Castle (fa)	Castle	Sasanian Era	1969	Sarpol-e Zahab, Kermanshahan
834	Tappeh Sarab-e Kavaneh (fa)	Mound	Prehistoric	1969	Sarab-e Kavaneh, Sarpol-e Zahab, Kermanshahan
835	Tappeh Rasul Aqa (fa)	Mound	Prehistoric	1969	Qaleh Zahab, Sarpol-e Zahab, Kermanshahan
836	Tappeh Gardno (fa)	Mound	Prehistoric	1969	Gardno, Sarpol-e Zahab, Kermanshahan
837	Tappeh Sumar (fa)	Mound	Prehistoric	1969	Sumar, Qasr-e Shirin, Kermanshahan
838	Chogha Gavaneh (fa)	Mound	Prehistoric	1969	Shahabad-e Gharb, Kermanshahan
839					
840					
841	Tappeh Telesm (fa)	Mound	Prehistoric	1969	Telesm, Dalahu, Kermanshahan
842	Shian Castle	Ruins	Prehistoric	1969	Qaleh-ye Shian, Shahabad-e Gharb, Kermanshahan
843					
844	Tappeh Shotor Mel (fa)	Mound	Prehistoric	1969	Shotor Mel, Sarpol-e Zahab, Kermanshahan
845	Gabri Castle (fa)	Ruins	Sasanian Era	1969	Sarpol-e Zahab, Kermanshahan
846	Tappeh Bareh Simin (fa)	Mound	Prehistoric	1969	Burak, Shahabad-e Gharb, Kermanshahan
847	Tappeh Cheshmeh Mahi (fa)	Mound	Prehistoric	1969	Cheshmeh Mahi, Holeylan, Ilam
848	Tappeh Gazerhhani (fa)	Mound	Prehistoric	1969	Gazerhhani, Kamyaran, Kordestan
849	Tangivar Rock Relief and Inscription (fa)	Rock Relief and Inscription	Assyrian Era	1969	Tangivar, Kamyaran, Kordestan
850	Tappeh Jengah (fa)	Mound	Prehistoric	1969	Shahabad-e Gharb, Kermanshahan
851	Tappeh Chogha Baft (fa)	Mound	Prehistoric	1969	Shahabad-e Gharb, Kermanshahan
852	Tappeh Pachogha (fa)	Mound	Prehistoric	1969	Firuzabad-e Pachogha, Kermanshah, Kermanshahan
853	Tappeh Rusi (fa)	Mound	Prehistoric	1969	Mahidasht, Kermanshah, Kermanshahan
854	Tappeh Kheybar (fa)	Mound	Prehistoric	1969	Kheybar, Ravansar, Kermanshahan
855	Tappeh Meymaz (fa)	Mound	Prehistoric	1969	Meymaz, Kermanshah, Kermanshahan
856	Mahidasht Caravanserai (fa) (fa)	Caravanserai	Safavid Era	1969	Robat, Kermanshah, Kermanshahan
857	Mahidasht Bridge (fa)	Bridge	Safavid Era	1969	Robat, Kermanshah, Kermanshahan
858	Tappeh Jameh Shuran-e Sofla (fa)	Mound	Prehistoric	1969	Jameh Shuran-e Sofla, Kermanshah, Kermanshahan
859	Tappeh Jameh Shuran-e Olya (fa)	Mound	Prehistoric	1969	Jameh Shuran-e Olya, Kermanshah, Kermanshahan
860	Tappeh Siah Chogha-ye Olya (fa)	Mound	Prehistoric	1969	Siah Chogha-ye Olya, Kermanshah, Kermanshahan
861	Tappeh Chogha Bahar (fa)	Mound	Prehistoric	1969	Chogha Bahar, Kermanshah, Kermanshahan
862	Tappeh Chogha Kaniuj (fa)	Mound	Prehistoric	1969	Chogha Kaniuj, Kermanshah, Kermanshahan
863	Tappeh Chogha Narges (fa)	Mound	Prehistoric	1969	Chogha Narges, Kermanshah, Kermanshahan
864	Tappeh Reza (fa)	Mound	Prehistoric	1969	Chogha Reza, Kermanshah, Kermanshahan
865					
866	Tappeh Galin Kabud (fa)	Mound	Prehistoric	1969	Marivan, Kordestan
867	Old City of Alasht (fa)	Old City	Early Islamic Era	1949	Alasht, Savadkuh, Mazandaran
868	Tark Mosque	Mosque	Ilkhanate Era	1969	Tark, Mianeh, East Azerbaijan
869					
870	Dokhtar Castle (fa) (fa)	Ruins	Sasanian Era	1969	Mianeh, East Azerbaijan
871	Emamzadeh Esmail (fa)	Emamzadeh	Safavid Era	1969	Mianeh, East Azerbaijan
872	Shahrchay Bridge (fa)	Bridge	Safavid Era	1969	Mianeh, East Azerbaijan
873	Tappeh Alanjareq (fa)	Mound	Prehistoric	1969	Alanjareq, Mianeh, East Azerbaijan
874	Sorkh Bridge (fa)	Bridge	Safavid Era	1969	Samian, Ardabil, Ardabil
875	Haft Cheshmeh Bridge (fa)	Bridge	Safavid Era	1969	Ardabil, Ardabil
876	Panj Cheshmeh Bridge (fa)	Bridge	Safavid Era	1969	Ardabil, Ardabil
877	Seh Cheshmeh Bridge (fa)	Bridge	Safavid Era	1969	Ardabil, Ardabil
878	Ajabshir Friday Mosque (fa)	Friday Mosque	Safavid Era	1969	Ajabshir, East Azerbaijan
879	Meydan Mosque (fa)	Mosque	Safavid Era	1969	Bonab, Mianeh, East Azerbaijan
880	Meydan Mosque (fa)	Mosque	Ilkhanate Era	1969	Tabriz, East Azerbaijan
881	Emamzadeh Hamzeh (fa)	Emamzadeh	Safavid Era	1969	Tabriz, East Azerbaijan
882	Mahabad Friday Mosque (fa)	Friday Mosque	Safavid Era	1969	Mahabad, West Azerbaijan
883	Shapur Khwast Castle	Castle	Sasanian Era	1969	Khorramabad, Lorestan
884	Aminabad Caravanserai (fa)	Caravanserai	Safavid Era	1969	Aminabad, Shahreza, Isfahan
885	Shah Zekrian Inscription (fa)	Inscription	Safavid Era	1969	Dehaqan, Isfahan
886	Tappeh Eskandari (fa)	Mound	Prehistoric	1969	Hafshejan, Shahrekord, Chaharmahal and Bakhtiari
887	Tappeh Shahr-e Kohneh (fa)	Mound	Prehistoric	1969	Hafshejan, Shahrekord, Chaharmahal and Bakhtiari
888	Tappeh Qaleh Kohneh (fa)	Mound	Prehistoric	1969	Nafech, Shahrekord, Chaharmahal and Bakhtiari
889	Shahrestan Bridge	Bridge	Sasanian Era	1969	Isfahan, Isfahan
890	Eziran Mosque (fa)	Mosque	Seljuk Era	1969	Eziran, Isfahan, Isfahan
891	Teimuri Building	Building	Timurid Era	1969	Isfahan, Isfahan
892	Jaddeh Bozorg Madraseh (fa)	Madraseh	Safavid Era	1969	Isfahan, Isfahan
893	Shamsabad Madraseh (fa)	Madraseh	Safavid Era	1969	Isfahan, Isfahan
894	Poudeh Friday Mosque (fa)	Friday Mosque	Zand Era	1969	Poudeh, Dehaqan, Isfahan
895					
896	Emamzadeh Mohammad	Emamzadeh	Ilkhanate Era	1969	Isfahan, Isfahan
897					
898	Old City of Tajabad (fa)	Old City	Early Islamic Era	1970	Tajabad, Natanz, Isfahan
899	Palace of Kuhdasht (fa)	Palace	Sasanian Era	1970	Kuhdasht, Lorestan
900	Tappeh Choghabol (fa)	Mound	Prehistoric	1970	Chaqabol, Rumeshkan, Lorestan
901	Emamzadeh Abdollah	Emamzadeh	Ilkhanate Era	1970	Bafq, Yazd
902	Band-e Amir	Dam	Buyid Era	1970	Band-e Amir, Zarqan, Fars
903	Bazaar of Saru Taqi (fa)	Bazaar	Safavid Era	1970	Isfahan, Isfahan
904	Tappeh Yahya	Mound	Prehistoric	1970	Soghan, Arzuiyeh, Kerman
905	Sheikh Oil Mill (fa)	Oil Mill	Safavid Era	1970	Isfahan, Isfahan
906	Fahraj Friday Mosque	Friday Mosque	Early Islamic Era	1970	Fahraj, Yazd
907	Tappeh Sabz (fa)	Mound	Prehistoric	1970	Mansuriyeh, Behbahan, Khuzestan
908	Emamzadeh Qasem (fa)	Emamzadeh	Safavid Era	1972	Shemiran, Tehran
909					
910	Hosseinieh Moshir (fa)	Hosseinieh	Qajar Era	1972	Shiraz, Fars
911	Moshir Mosque (fa)	Mosque	Qajar Era	1972	Shiraz, Fars
912	Delgosha Garden	Persian Garden	Qajar Era	1972	Shiraz, Fars
913	Afifabad Garden	Persian Garden	Qajar Era	1972	Shiraz, Fars
914					
915	Langarud Bridge (fa)	Bridge	Safavid Era	1972	Langarud, Gilan
916	Khwaju-ye Kermani Tomb (fa)	Tomb	Qajar Era	1972	Shiraz, Fars
917	Vakil Hammam	Hammam	Zand Era	1972	Shiraz, Fars
918	Karim Khan Citadel	Citadel	Zand Era	1972	Shiraz, Fars
919	Pahlavi-Dezh Bridge (fa)	Bridge	Safavid Era	1972	Pahlavi-Dezh, Golestan
920	Shebeli Tower	Mausoleum	Seljuk Era	1972	Damavand, Tehran
921	Emamzadeh Abdollah (fa)	Emamzadeh	Timurid Era	1972	Damavand, Tehran
922	Emamzadeh Obeydollah (fa)	Emamzadeh	Seljuk Era	1972	Damavand, Tehran
923	Hosseinieh Qavam (fa)	Hosseinieh	Qajar Era	1972	Shiraz, Fars
924	Vakil Bazaar	Bazaar	Zand Era	1972	Shiraz, Fars
925	Atabakan Mosque (fa)	Mosque	Timurid Era	1972	Shahrekord, Chaharmahal and Bakhtiari
926	Zeineddin Caravanserai	Caravanserai	Safavid Era	1972	Ribat-e Zeineddin, Mehriz, Yazd
927	Mausoleum of Sar-e Qabr-e Aqa (fa)	Mausoleum	Qajar Era	1972	Tehran, Tehran
928	Jahan-Nama Garden (fa)	Persian Garden	Zand Era	1972	Shiraz, Fars
929	Khan Bridge (fa)	Bridge	Safavid Era	1972	Marvdasht, Fars
930	Emamzadeh Eshaq (fa)	Emamzadeh	Safavid Era	1972	Harand, Isfahan
931	Takht Garden (fa)	Persian Garden	Qajar Era	1972	Shiraz, Fars
932	Bazaar of Sardar (fa)	Bazaar	Qajar Era	1972	Qazvin, Qazvin
933	Haj Kazem Cistern	Cistern	Qajar Era	1972	Qazvin, Qazvin
934	Meymeh Friday Mosque	Friday Mosque	Safavid Era	1972	Meymeh, Isfahan
935					
936	Doktar-e Gabr Cistern (fa)	Cistern	Sasanian Era	1973	Eqlid, Fars
937	Guyom Rock Reliefs (fa)	Rock Relief	Sasanian Era	1973	Guyom, Shiraz, Fars
938	Zinat ol-Molk House (fa)	Historic House	Qajar Era	1973	Shiraz, Fars
939	Qir Rock Reliefs (fa) (fa)	Rock Relief	Arsacid Era	1973	Qir and Karzin, Fars
940	Emamzadeh Qasem (fa)	Emamzadeh	Safavid Era	1973	Qasemabad, Tafresh, Markazi
941	Emamzadeh Atabakhash (fa)	Emamzadeh	Buyid Era	1973	Kashan, Isfahan
942	Chah-e Mortaz-Ali (fa)	Monument	Buyid Era	1973	Shiraz, Fars
943	Rab'-e Rashidi	Ruins	Ilkhanate Era	1973	Tabriz, East Azerbaijan
944					
945	Moaven ol-Molk Takyeh	Tekyeh	Qajar Era	1973	Kermanshah, Kermanshahan
946	Mausoleum of Qotbeddin Yusef (fa)	Mausoleum	Timurid Era	1973	Guyom, Shiraz, Fars
947	Band-e Bahman (fa) (fa)	Dam	Sasanian Era	1973	Kavar, Fars
747	Chehshmeh Emarat (fa)	Palace	Safavid Era	1973	Behshahr, Mazandaran
949					
950	Jahrom Bazaar (fa)	Bazaar	Zand Era	1973	Jahrom, Fars
951	Mausoleum of Tajeddin Khivi (fa)	Mausoleum	Ilkhanate Era	1973	Astara, Gilan
952	Sardar Mofakham Mansion (fa)	Mansion	Qajar Era	1973	Bojnurd, North Khorasan
953	Mausoleum of Hassan Vaqef (fa)	Mausoleum	Ilkhanate Era	1973	Natanz, Isfahan
954	Mausoleum of Mir Seyyed (fa)	Mausoleum	Ilkhanate Era	1973	Natanz, Isfahan
955	Tappeh Azbeki (fa) (fa)	Mound	Prehistoric	1973	Azbeki, Nazarabad, Alborz
956	Yazd Fortifications (fa)	Fortification	Seljuk Era	1973	Yazd, Yazd
957	Ij Fire Temple (fa)	Fire Temple	Sasanian Era	1973	Ij, Estahban, Fars
958	Mansouriyeh Madraseh (fa)	Madraseh	Ilkhanate Era	1973	Shiraz, Fars
959	Emamzadeh Nureddin (fa)	Emamzadeh	Buyid Era	1973	Ardakan, Yazd
960	Khan Madraseh (fa)	Madraseh	Safavid Era	1973	Jahrom, Fars
961	Gonbad-e Azod (fa)	Monument	Buyid Era	1973	Shiraz, Fars
962	Mausoleum of Sheikh Abdossalam (fa)	Mausoleum	Ilkhanate Era	1973	Khonj, Fars
963	Jizad Ruins (fa)	Ruins	Seljuk Era	1973	Roshtkhar, Razavi Khorasan
964	Molla Esmail Mosque (fa)	Mosque	Qajar Era	1973	Yazd, Yazd
965	Emamzadeh Chehel Akhtaran (fa) (fa)	Emamzadeh	Safavid Era	1973	Qom, Qom
966	Shams Minaret (fa)	Minaret	Seljuk Era	1973	Khoy, West Azerbaijan
967					
968	Emamzadeh Chehel Akhtaran (fa) (fa)	Emamzadeh	Timurid Era	1974	Gurab, Karaj, Alborz
969	Mausoleum of Habbakuk (fa)	Mausoleum	Ilkhanate Era	1974	Tuyserkan, Hamadan
970					
971	Emamzadeh Hassan (fa)	Emamzadeh	Ilkhanate Era	1974	Kashan, Isfahan
972	Tabriziha Mosque	Mosque	Qajar Era	1974	Kashan, Isfahan
973	Neshat Garden (fa)	Persian Garden	Afsharid Era	1974	Lar, Fars
974	Behistun Caravanserai	Caravanserai	Safavid Era	1974	Bisotun, Harsin, Kermanshahan
975	Sheikh Danial Minaret (fa)	Minaret	Ilkhanate Era	1974	Khonj, Fars
976	Khosrow Agha Hammam demolished in 1995	Hammam	Safavid Era	1974	Isfahan, Isfahan
977	Timcheh-ye Amir (fa)	Bazaar	Qajar Era	1974	Tabriz, East Azerbaijan
978	Deh Namak Caravanserai (fa)	Caravanserai	Safavid Era	1974	Deh Namak, Aradan, Semnan
979	Emamzadeh Abdolkheyr (fa)	Emamzadeh	Safavid Era	1974	Qerveh, Abhar, Zanjan
980	Emamzadeh Yahya	Emamzadeh	Safavid Era	1974	Sain Qaleh, Abhar, Zanjan
981	Mausoleum of Pir Ahmad-e Zahrnoush (fa)	Mausoleum	Seljuk Era	1974	Abhar, Zanjan
982	Emamzadeh Zeyd ol-Kabir (fa)	Emamzadeh	Buyid Era	1974	Abhar, Zanjan
983	Tashvir Temple (fa)	Fire Temple	Sasanian Era	1974	Tashvir, Tarom, Zanjan
984	Pircham Temple (fa)	Fire Temple	Sasanian Era	1974	Pircham, Tarom, Zanjan
985	Alzin Temple (fa)	Fire Temple	Sasanian Era	1974	Alzin, Tarom, Zanjan
986	Mausoleum of Jamasp (fa)	Mausoleum	Achaemenid Era	1974	Gareh, Khafr, Fars
987	Jahrom Friday Mosque	Friday Mosque	Seljuk Era	1974	Jahrom, Fars
988	Qotbabad Temple (fa)	Fire Temple	Sasanian Era	1974	Baba Arab, Jahrom, Fars
989	Soltaniyeh Castle	Ruins	1st millennium BC	1974	Soltaniyeh, Zanjan
990	Martha Peters House (fa)	Historic House	Safavid Era	1974	New Julfa, Isfahan, Isfahan
991	Mansourolmolki House (fa)	Historic House	Safavid Era	1974	Isfahan, Isfahan
992	Haqiqi House (fa)	Historic House	Safavid Era	1974	Isfahan, Isfahan
993	Kharrazi House (fa)	Historic House	Safavid Era	1974	Isfahan, Isfahan
994	Soukiasian House (fa)	Historic House	Safavid Era	1974	New Julfa, Isfahan, Isfahan
995	Pirnia House (fa)	Historic House	Safavid Era	1974	Nain, Isfahan
996	Qodsiyeh House (fa)	Historic House	Safavid Era	1974	Isfahan, Isfahan
997	Sheikh ol-Eslam House	Historic House	Safavid Era	1974	Isfahan, Isfahan
998	Baqaei House (fa)	Historic House	Safavid Era	1974	Isfahan, Isfahan
999	Lavvaf House (fa)	Historic House	Qajar Era	1974	Isfahan, Isfahan
1000	Bozorgzad House (fa)	Historic House	Safavid Era	1974	Isfahan, Isfahan

=== No. 1001 to 1250 ===
Reg. no.	Name	Category	Historic Era	Reg. date	Location
1001	Nilfroushan House (fa)	Historic House	Qajar Era	1974	Isfahan, Isfahan
1002	Rouhani House (fa)	Historic House	Safavid Era	1974	Isfahan, Isfahan
1003	Emamzadeh Esmail (fa)	Emamzadeh	Seljuk Era	1974	Meymand, Firuzabad, Fars
1004	Emamzadeh Fazl (fa) (fa)	Emamzadeh	Seljuk Era	1974	Jahrom, Fars
1005	Mirza Mehdi Esmail (fa)	Cistern	Afsharid Era	1974	Sari, Mazandaran
1006	Sharbatkhaneh of Natanz (fa)	Building	Ilkhanate Era	1974	Natanz, Isfahan
1007					
1008	Shahyad Monument	Monument	Pahlavi Era	1974	Tehran, Iran
1009	Mausoleum of Hafez	Mausoleum	Pahlavi Era	1974	Shiraz, Fars
1010	Mausoleum of Saadi	Mausoleum	Pahlavi Era	1974	Shiraz, Fars
1011	Vakil Complex (fa)	Complex	Qajar Era	1974	Kerman, Kerman
1012	Shazdeh Garden	Persian Garden	Qajar Era	1974	Mahan, Kerman
1013	Eram Garden	Persian Garden	Qajar Era	1974	Shiraz, Fars
1014	Emamzadeh Esmail (fa)	Emamzadeh	Ilkhanate Erass	1974	Abhar, Zanjan
1015	Mausoleum of Baba Yadegar (fa)	Mausoleum	Safavid Era	1974	Baba Yadegar (fa), Dalahu, Kermanshahan
1016	Timcheh-ye Amin od-Dowleh	Bazaar	Qajar Era	1975	Kashan, Isfahan
1017	Dasht-e Halqeh Tappeh (fa)	Mound	Sasanian Era	1975	Dasht-e Halqeh, Minudasht, Golestan
1018	Qaleh Gabri Tappeh (fa)	Mound	Sasanian Era	1975	Gonbad-e Kavus, Golestan
1019	Sojas Friday Mosque	Friday Mosque	Seljuk Era	1975	Sojas, Khodabandeh, Zanjan
1020	Paqela Tappeh (fa)	Mound	Sasanian Era	1975	Harsin, Kermanshahan
1021	Bazaar of Qazvin (fa)	Bazaar	Safavid Era	1975	Qazvin, Qazvin
1022	Pahneh Hammam (fa)	Hammam	Timurid Era	1975	Semnan, Semnan
1023	Emamzadeh Ali Sadat (fa)	Emamzadeh	Ilkhanate Era	1975	Emamzadeh Sadat, Charam, Kohgiluyeh and Boyer-Ahmad
1024					
1025	Tangeh-ye Vashi Rock Relief	Rock Relief	Qajar Era	1975	Firuzkuh, Tehran
1026	Dashkasan Temple	Temple	Ilkhanate Era	1975	Viyar, Soltaniyeh, Zanjan
1027	Mausoleum of Fakhreddin (fa)	Mausoleum	Timurid Era	1975	Golma, Sari, Mazandaran
1028	Emamzadeh Qasem (fa)	Emamzadeh	Timurid Era	1975	Isa Khandaq, Sari, Mazandaran
1029					
1030	Emamzadeh Isa (fa)	Emamzadeh	Timurid Era	1975	Kharmian, Sari, Mazandaran
1031	Tappeh Mir-Omar (fa) (fa)	Mound	Sasanian Era	1975	Gosht, Saravan, Sistan and Baluchestan
1032	Tappeh Vahedi (fa)	Mound	Prehistoric	1975	Minab, Hormozgan
1033					
1034	Tappeh Hesamabad (fa)	Mound	Prehistoric	1975	Hesamabad, Asadabad, Hamadan
1035	Tappeh Vandarabad (fa)	Mound	Prehistoric	1975	Vandarabad, Asadabad, Hamadan
1036	Tappeh Baba Kamal (fa)	Mound	Prehistoric	1975	Baba Kamal, Tuyserkan, Hamadan
1037	Tappeh Mohajeran (fa)	Mound	Prehistoric	1975	Mohajeran, Bahar, Hamadan
1038	Tappeh Simin Zagheh (fa)	Mound	Prehistoric	1975	Simin Zagheh, Bahar, Hamadan
1039	Tappeh Anuch (fa)	Mound	Prehistoric	1975	Anuch, Malayer, Hamadan
1040	Tappeh Kavanaj (fa)	Mound	Prehistoric	1975	Kavanaj, Asadabad, Hamadan
1041					
1042	Tappeh Gurab (fa)	Mound	Prehistoric	1975	Gurab, Malayer, Hamadan
1043	Mausoleum of Sheikh Ruzbehan (fa)	Mausoleum	Pahlavi Era	1975	Shiraz, Fars
1044	Nahar-Khoran Palace (fa)	Palace	Pahlavi Era	1975	Rudsar, Gilan
1045	Chai-Khoran Palace (fa)	Palace	Pahlavi Era	1975	Chalus, Mazandaran
1046	Tall-e Malyan (Anshan) (fa) (fa)	Mound	Prehistoric	1975	Malyan, Sepidan, Fars
1047	Tappeh Nurabad (fa)	Mound	Prehistoric	1975	Nurabad, Khodabandeh, Zanjan
1048	Tappeh Mirkandi (fa)	Mound	Prehistoric	1975	Shirmisheh, Tarom, Zanjan
1049	Sari-Tappeh Cemetery (fa)	Cemetery	Arsacid Era	1975	Sari-Tappeh, Zanjan, Zanjan
1050	Tappeh Qezel-Erkh (fa)	Mound	Prehistoric	1975	Taham, Zanjan, Zanjan
1051	Manjiq Tappeh (fa)	Mound	Prehistoric	1975	Jezlan Dasht, Tarom, Zanjan
1052					
1053	Tappeh Qaleh Gabri (fa)	Mound	Prehistoric	1975	Ab Bar, Tarom, Zanjan
1054	Mausoleum of Veys (fa)	Mausoleum	Seljuk Era	1975	Khvoshinan, Kermanshah, Kermanshahan
1055	Khanom Mosque	Mosque	Qajar Era	1975	Zanjan, Zanjan
1056	Zanjan Friday Mosque	Friday Mosque	Qajar Era	1975	Zanjan, Zanjan
1057	Mausoleum of Shams (fa)	Mausoleum	Early Islamic Era	1975	Amol, Mazandaran
1058	Shapuri Bridge	Bridge	Sasanian Era	1975	Khorramabad, Lorestan
1059	Qasr-e Bahram Caravanserai (fa)	Caravanserai	Sasanian Era	1975	Garmsar, Semnan
1060	Amol Fire Temple	Fire Temple	Sasanian Era	1975	Amol, Mazandaran
1061	Mausoleum of Qasem Anvar (fa)	Mausoleum	Qajar Era	1975	Langar, Torbat-e Jam, Razavi Khorasan
1062	Afghan Mosque (fa)	Mosque	Afsharid Era	1975	Bandar Lengeh, Hormozgan
1063	Malek bin Abbas Mosque	Mosque	Safavid Era	1975	Bandar Lengeh, Hormozgan
1064	Agha Mosque (fa)	Mosque	Zand Era	1975	Bandar Lengeh, Hormozgan
1065	Khodadad Mosque (fa)	Mosque	Zand Era	1975	Bandar Lengeh, Hormozgan
1066					
1067	Atrforoush House (fa)	Historic House	Qajar Era	1975	Shiraz, Fars
1068	Nasir ol-Molk House (fa)	Historic House	Qajar Era	1975	Shiraz, Fars
1069	Kazemzadeh House (fa)	Historic House	Zand Era	1975	Shiraz, Fars
1070	Salehi House (fa)	Historic House	Qajar Era	1975	Shiraz, Fars
1071	Emami House (fa)	Historic House	Qajar Era	1975	Shiraz, Fars
1072	Afsharian House (fa)	Historic House	Qajar Era	1975	Shiraz, Fars
1073	Qavam ol-Molki Building (fa)	Building	Qajar Era	1975	Shiraz, Fars
1074	Muzeh Cistern (fa)	Cistern	Safavid Era	1975	Bandar Abbas, Hormozgan
1075	Ali Agha Yakhchal (fa)	Yakhchal	Qajar Era	1975	Rafsanjan, Kerman
1076	Arg of Arak (fa) (fa)	Citadel	Qajar Era	1975	Arak, Markazi
1077	Mausoleum of Kkezr (fa)	Mausoleum	Early Islamic Era	1975	Hamadan, Hamadan
1078					
1079					
1080	Sarraf Mosque (fa)	Mosque	Zand Era	1975	Shiraz, Fars
1081	Ghazanfar Hosseinieh (fa)	Hosseinieh	Zand Era	1975	Bandar Lengeh, Hormozgan
1082	Bangi Hosseinieh (fa)	Hosseinieh	Zand Era	1975	Bandar Lengeh, Hormozgan
1083	Borujerdi House	Historic House	Qajar Era	1975	Kashan, Isfahan
1084	Sar Yazd Citadel	Citadel	Sasanian Era	1975	Sar Yazd, Mehriz, Yazd
1085	Saeidiyeh Madraseh (fa)	Madraseh	Safavid Era	1975	Arsanjan, Fars
1086	Narin Qaleh of Meybod	Castle	Sasanian Era	1975	Meybod, Yazd
1087	Hassan Khan Madraseh (fa)	Madraseh	Safavid Era	1975	Mashhad, Razavi Khorasan
1088	Baqeriyeh Madraseh (fa)	Madraseh	Safavid Era	1975	Mashhad, Razavi Khorasan
1089	Village of Abyaneh	Village	Sasanian Era	1975	Abyaneh, Natanz, Isfahan
1090	Village of Masuleh	Village	Timurid Era	1975	Masuleh, Fuman, Gilan
1091	Mausoleum of Abu Lulua	Mausoleum	Ilkhanate Era	1975	Kashan, Isfahan
1092	Emamzadeh Motahhar	Emamzadeh	Timurid Era	1975	Bumahen, Tehran
1093	Moqri Kola Takyeh (fa)	Tekyeh	Zand Era	1975	Moqri Kola, Babol, Mazandaran
1094	Farashah Qadamgah (fa)	Shrine	Zand Era	1975	Farashah, Taft, Yazd
1095	Gabrabad Caravanserai (fa)	Caravanserai	Safavid Era	1975	Gabrabad, Kashan, Isfahan
1096	Mohammadiyeh Gate (fa)	Gate	Qajar Era	1975	Tehran, Tehran
1097	Bazaar of Tabriz	Bazaar	Early Islamic Era	1975	Tabriz, East Azerbaijan
1098	Haritash House (fa)	Historic House	Safavid Era	1975	Isfahan, Isfahan
1099	Behrouz House (fa)	Historic House	Safavid Era	1975	Isfahan, Isfahan
1100	Sarraf House (fa)	Historic House	Safavid Era	1975	Isfahan, Isfahan
1101	Kamyabi House (fa)	Historic House	Safavid Era	1975	Isfahan, Isfahan
1102	Nayel House (fa)	Historic House	Safavid Era	1975	Isfahan, Isfahan
1103	Roghani House (fa)	Historic House	Safavid Era	1975	Isfahan, Isfahan
1104	Rangraz-ha House (fa)	Historic House	Safavid Era	1975	Isfahan, Isfahan
1105	Enayati House (fa)	Historic House	Safavid Era	1975	Isfahan, Isfahan
1106	Lavafinejad House (fa)	Historic House	Safavid Era	1975	Isfahan, Isfahan
1107	Haj Hassan House (fa)	Historic House	Safavid Era	1975	Isfahan, Isfahan
1108	Asemi House (fa)	Historic House	Seljuk Era	1975	Isfahan, Isfahan
1109	Emamzadeh Yush (fa)	Emamzadeh	Early Islamic Era	1975	Lavasan-e Bozorg, Tehran
1110	Izadkhwast Bridge (fa)	Bridge	Safavid Era	1975	Izadkhwast, Abadeh, Fars
1111	Tang-e Khoshk Inscription (fa)	Inscription	Sasanian Era	1975	Sivand, Marvdasht, Fars
1112	Izadkhwast Caravanserai	Caravanserai	Safavid Era	1975	Izadkhwast, Abadeh, Fars
1113	Bard Caravanserai (fa)	Caravanserai	Safavid Era	1975	Baghestan, Bavanat, Fars
1114	Nezamiyeh Madraseh (fa)	Madraseh	Safavid Era	1975	Shiraz, Fars
1115	Shahzadeh Hammam (fa)	Hammam	Safavid Era	1975	Isfahan, Isfahan
1116	Tappeh Najafqoli Khan (fa)	Mound	Sasanian Era	1975	Mianeh, East Azerbaijan
1117	Selasal Castle	Castle	Sasanian Era	1975	Shushtar, Khuzestan
1118	Sanjideh Mosque (fa)	Mosque	Seljuk Era	1975	Qazvin, Qazvin
1119	Mohammad-Rahim Hammam (fa)	Hammam	Qajar Era	1975	Qazvin, Qazvin
1120	Mausoleum of Baba Pir (fa)	Mausoleum	Ilkhanate Era	1975	Khwansar, Isfahan
1121	Khwansar Friday Mosque	Friday Mosque	Safavid Era	1975	Khwansar, Isfahan
1122	St. Sarkis Church of Sir (fa) (fa)	Church	Sasanian Era	1975	Sir, Urmia, West Azerbaijan
1123					
1124	Ishan Madraseh (fa)	Madraseh	Qajar Era	1975	Karim Ishan, Maraveh Tappeh, Golestan
1125	Tamijan Bridge (fa) (fa)	Bridge	Safavid Era	1975	Tamijan, Rudsar, Gilan
1126	Tappeh Aslan (fa)	Mound	Sasanian Era	1975	Bumahen, Tehran
1127					
1128	Sakhasi Tappeh (fa)	Mound	Prehistoric	1975	Sakhasi Tappeh, Naqadeh, West Azerbaijan
1129	Tappeh Yonjezar	Mound	Prehistoric	1975	Dehjalal, Khodabandeh, Zanjan
1130	Sulijar Tappeh (fa)	Mound	Prehistoric	1975	Hasan Abdali, Zanjan, Zanjan
1131	Tappeh Andabad (fa)	Mound	Prehistoric	1975	Andabad-e Olya, Zanjan, Zanjan
1132	Morad Tappeh (fa)	Mound	Prehistoric	1975	Yusefabad, Abhar, Zanjan
1133	Jamshid Tappeh (fa)	Mound	Prehistoric	1975	Do Tappeh Sofla, Khodabandeh, Zanjan
1134					
1135	Hossein Bazarduz House (fa)	Historic House	Qajar Era	1975	Isfahan, Isfahan
1136	Shamaeian House (fa)	Historic House	Qajar Era	1975	Isfahan, Isfahan
1137	Fani House (fa)	Historic House	Qajar Era	1975	Isfahan, Isfahan
1138	Nabavinejad House (fa)	Historic House	Qajar Era	1975	Isfahan, Isfahan
1139	Seirafi House (fa)	Historic House	Qajar Era	1975	Isfahan, Isfahan
1140	Taqi Bazarduz House (fa)	Historic House	Qajar Era	1975	Isfahan, Isfahan
1141	Mazaheri House (fa)	Historic House	Qajar Era	1975	Isfahan, Isfahan
1142	Rejali House (fa)	Historic House	Qajar Era	1975	Isfahan, Isfahan
1143	Martirusian House (fa)	Historic House	Qajar Era	1975	Isfahan, Isfahan
1144	Savoji House (fa)	Historic House	Qajar Era	1975	Isfahan, Isfahan
1145	Zargar House (fa)	Historic House	Qajar Era	1975	Isfahan, Isfahan
1146	Kahrangi House (fa)	Historic House	Qajar Era	1975	Isfahan, Isfahan
1147	Sartipi House (fa)	Historic House	Qajar Era	1975	Isfahan, Isfahan
1148	Panahandeh House (fa)	Historic House	Qajar Era	1975	Isfahan, Isfahan
1149	Majlesi House (fa)	Historic House	Qajar Era	1975	Isfahan, Isfahan
1150	Tutunchi House (fa)	Historic House	Qajar Era	1975	Isfahan, Isfahan
1151	Emam Jom'eh House (fa)	Historic House	Qajar Era	1975	Isfahan, Isfahan
1152	Kolahdooz House (fa)	Historic House	Qajar Era	1975	Isfahan, Isfahan
1153	Toosizadeh House (fa)	Historic House	Qajar Era	1975	Isfahan, Isfahan
1154	Badri House (fa)	Historic House	Qajar Era	1975	Isfahan, Isfahan
1155	Abaeian House (fa)	Historic House	Qajar Era	1975	Isfahan, Isfahan
1156	Shafie Meshki House (fa)	Historic House	Qajar Era	1975	Isfahan, Isfahan
1157	Mehdi Meshki House (fa)	Historic House	Qajar Era	1975	Isfahan, Isfahan
1158	Semsarzadeh House (fa)	Historic House	Qajar Era	1975	Isfahan, Isfahan
1159	Zaven House (fa)	Historic House	Qajar Era	1975	Isfahan, Isfahan
1160	Akbar Agha House (fa)	Historic House	Qajar Era	1975	Isfahan, Isfahan
1161	Ghafouri House (fa)	Historic House	Qajar Era	1975	Isfahan, Isfahan
1162	Keyvan House (fa)	Historic House	Qajar Era	1975	Isfahan, Isfahan
1163	Nazerian House (fa)	Historic House	Qajar Era	1975	Isfahan, Isfahan
1164	Salehi House (fa)	Historic House	Qajar Era	1975	Isfahan, Isfahan
1165	Shahid-e Avval House (fa)	Historic House	Qajar Era	1975	Isfahan, Isfahan
1166	Ghafourian House (fa)	Historic House	Qajar Era	1975	Isfahan, Isfahan
1167	Mofakham Building	Building	Qajar Era	1975	Bojnurd, North Khorasan
1168	Haghighat House (fa)	Historic House	Qajar Era	1975	Khwansar, Isfahan
1169	Mausoleum of Shah Shoja (fa)	Mausoleum	Pahlavi Era	1975	Shiraz, Fars
1170	Harandi Garden (fa)	Persian Garden	Pahlavi Era	1975	Kerman, Kerman
1171	Constitution House	Historic House	Qajar Era	1975	Tabriz, East Azerbaijan
1172	Lotfollah House (fa)	Historic House	Qajar Era	1975	Sanandaj, Kordestan
1173	Mausoleum of Attar	Mausoleum	Timurid Era	1975	Nishapur, Razavi Khorasan
1174	Mausoleum of Nader Shah	Mausoleum	Pahlavi Era	1975	Mashhad, Razavi Khorasan
1175	Mausoleum of Omar Khayyam	Mausoleum	Pahlavi Era	1975	Nishapur, Razavi Khorasan
1176	Mausoleum of Ferdowsi	Mausoleum	Pahlavi Era	1975	Tus, Razavi Khorasan
1177	Habibi House (fa)	Historic House	Qajar Era	1975	Khwansar, Isfahan
1178	Emamzadeh Haroun (fa)	Emamzadeh	Ilkhanate Era	1975	Taraznahid, Saveh, Markazi
1179	Khalaj Hammam (fa)	Hammam	Zand Era	1975	Vidar, Saveh, Markazi
1180	Malek House (fa)	Historic House	Qajar Era	1975	Saveh, Markazi
1181	Mausoleum of Samuel (fa)	Mausoleum	Ilkhanate Era	1975	Peyghambar, Saveh, Markazi
1182	Band-e Amir Shah Abbasi (fa)	Dam	Seljuk Era	1975	Hasanabad-e Band, Saveh, Markazi
1183	Emamzadeh Younes (fa)	Emamzadeh	Timurid Era	1975	Maraq, Saveh, Markazi
1184	Sorkheh Deh Bridge (fa)	Bridge	Safavid Era	1975	Sorkheh Deh, Saveh, Markazi
1185	Abdolghaffar Khan Caravanserai (fa)	Caravanserai	Zand Era	1975	Bagh-e Sheikh, Saveh, Markazi
1186	Khoshkrud Caravanserai (fa)	Caravanserai	Safavid Era	1975	Khoshkrud, Zarandieh, Markazi
1187	Hajib Caravanserai (fa)	Caravanserai	Safavid Era	1975	Hajib, Buin Zahra, Qazvin
1188					
1189	Bazaar Mosque (fa)	Mosque	Zand Era	1975	Saveh, Markazi
1190	Tappeh Gabri (fa)	Mound	Prehistoric	1975	Alvir, Zarandieh, Markazi
1191	Ameli Cistern (fa)	Cistern	Zand Era	1975	Saveh, Markazi
1192	Tappeh Ajan (fa)	Mound	Prehistoric	1975	Ajan, Zarandieh, Markazi
1193	Tappeh Asiabad (fa)	Mound	Prehistoric	1975	Saveh, Markazi
1194	Tappeh Emamzadeh Abdollah (fa)	Mound	Prehistoric	1975	Owjan, Saveh, Markazi
1195					
1196	Tappeh Yengeh Erkhi (fa)	Mound	Prehistoric	1975	Nowbaran, Saveh, Markazi
1197	Qareh Qalat Ruins (fa)	Ruins	Achaemenid Era	1975	Seydan, Marvdasht, Fars
1198	Emamzadeh Nouh (fa)	Emamzadeh	Safavid Era	1975	Baleqlu, Saveh, Markazi
1199					
1200	Tappeh Majidabad (fa)	Mound	Prehistoric	1975	Nowbaran, Saveh, Markazi

=== No. 1251 to 1500 ===
Reg. no.	Name	Category	Historic Era	Reg. date	Location
