= Dag Castle =

Castle in East Azerbaijan Province, Iran

- قلعه داغ

General information
- Type: Castle
- Location: Ahar County, Iran
- Renovation cost

Iran National Heritage List
- Official name: Naqduz/Dagh Fort
- Type: Ruins
- Designated: 1967
- Reference no.: 628
- Conservation organization: Cultural Heritage, Handicrafts and Tourism Organization of Iran

Dag Fort (Persian: قلعه داغ) is a historical castle located in Ahar County in East Azerbaijan Province, The longevity of this fortress dates back to the Sasanian Empire.
