= Khvorheh Mansion =

Khvorheh Mansion / Temple of Khvorheh
- عمارت خورهه / معبد خورهه
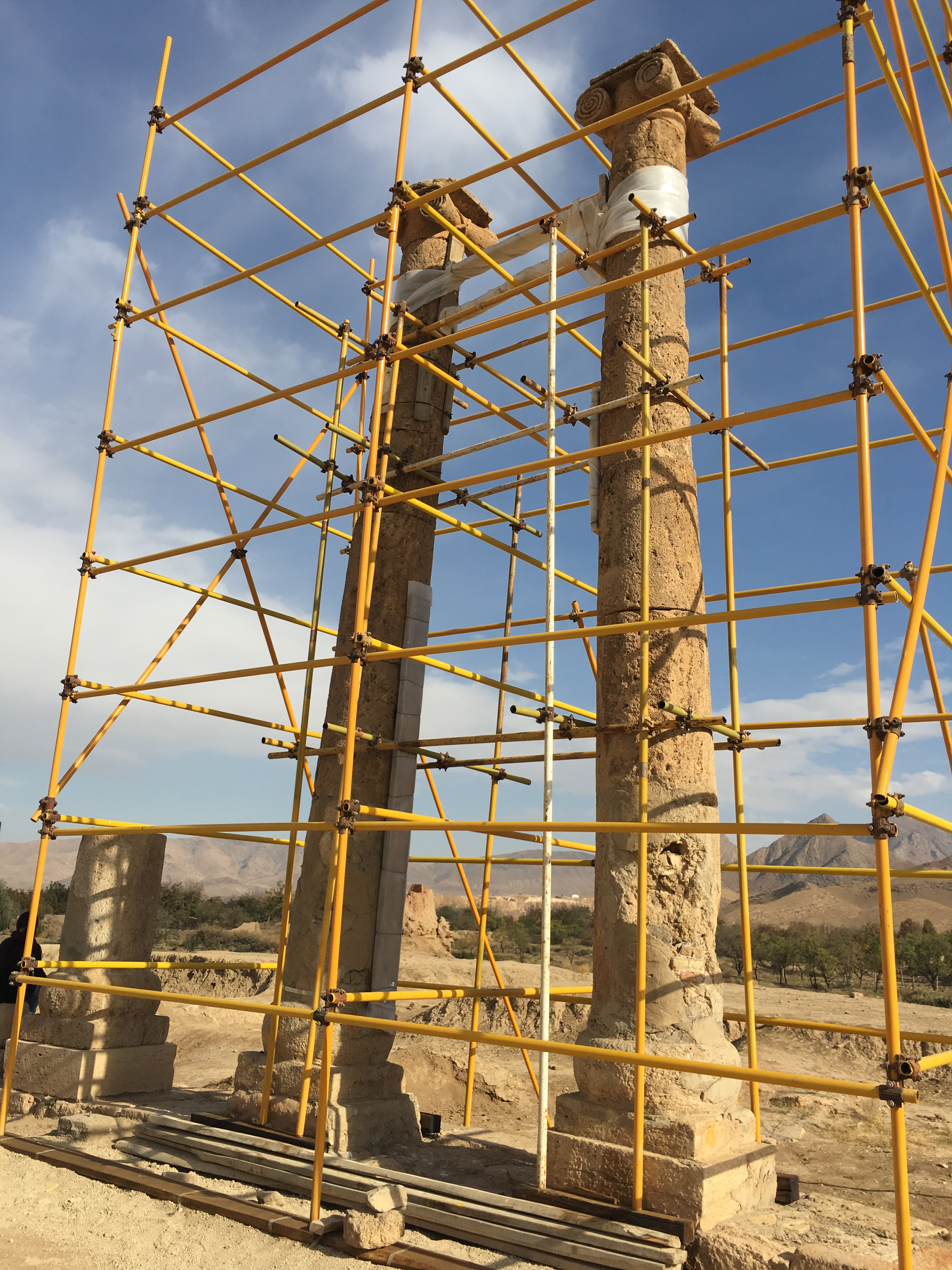

- Location within Iran

General information
- Type: Mansion and Temple
- Location: Mahallat County, Markazi Province, Iran

Dimensions
- Diameter

Iran National Heritage List
- Official name: Khworheh Mansion
- Type: Ruins
- Designated: 1932
- Reference no.: 131
- Conservation organization: Cultural Heritage, Handicrafts and Tourism Organization of Iran

The Khvorheh Mansion is a historical mansion and temple from the Parthian Empire and is located in Mahallat County, Markazi Province.
