= Rabat Tepe =

Archaeological site in Iran

Tappeh Rabat تپه رباط
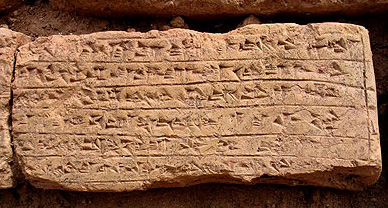
- A cuneiform tablet from Rabat Tepe

- Location within Iran
- 36°12′11″N 45°32′35″E
- Location: Sardasht, West Azerbaijan, Iran

Iran National Heritage List
- Official name: Tappeh Rabat
- Type: Mound
- Designated: 1967
- Reference no.: 602
- Conservation organization: Cultural Heritage, Handicrafts and Tourism Organization of Iran

Rabat Tepe is an Iron Age archaeological site located about 5 km east of Sardasht in northwestern Iran.
