= Khaje Alam Minaret =

Iranian national heritage site

Khwajeh Alam Minaret
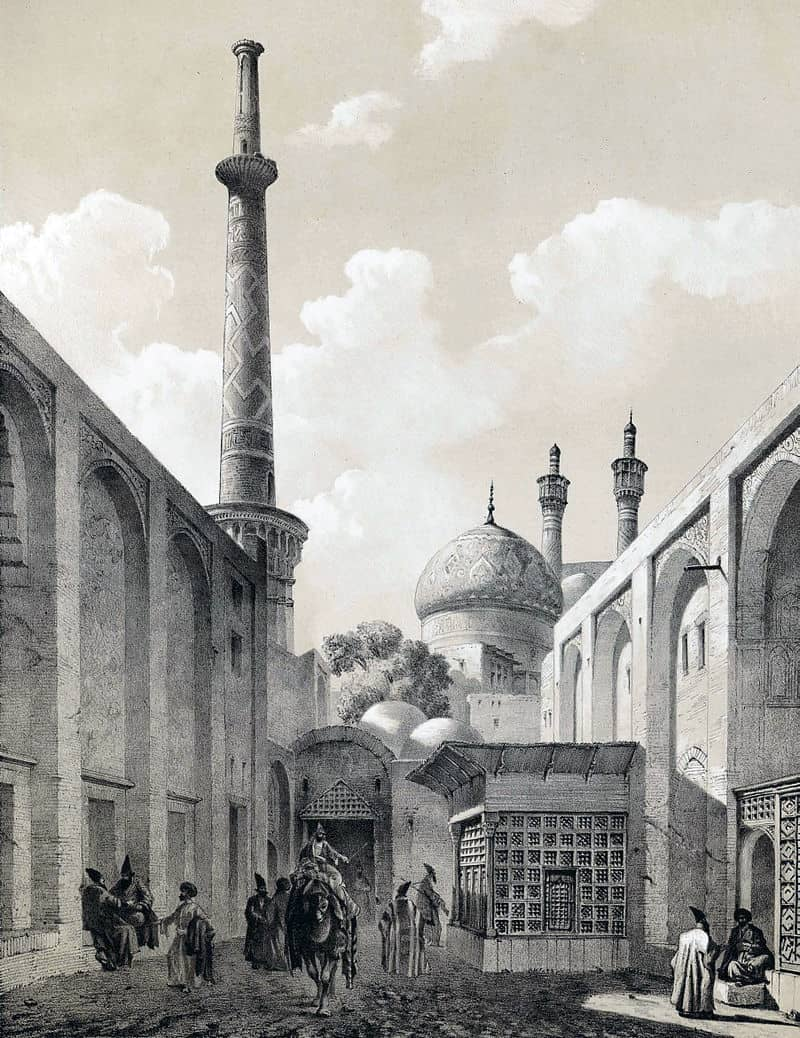
- Khwajeh Alam Minaret by Eugène Flandin, 1839

Iran National Heritage List
- Official name: Khwajeh Alam Minaret
- Type: Minaret
- Designated: 1932
- Reference no.: 98
- Conservation organization: Cultural Heritage, Handicrafts and Tourism Organization of Iran

Khaje Alam Minaret (Persian: مناره خواجه علم) belonged to the Timurid Empire and is located at Hatef street in Isfahan. This relic was recorded in Iran's National Heritage on 6 January 1932.
