= Kol Kharabeh Castle =

Castle in West Azerbaijan Province, Iran

- قلعه کل خرابه

General information
- Type: Castle
- Location: Urmia County, Iran
- Renovation cost

Iran National Heritage List
- Official name: Kol Kharabeh Castle
- Type: Ruins
- Designated: 1965
- Reference no.: 463
- Conservation organization: Cultural Heritage, Handicrafts and Tourism Organization of Iran

Kol Kharabeh Castle (Persian: قلعه کل خرابه) is a historical castle located in Urmia County in West Azerbaijan Province, The longevity of this fortress dates back to the 1st millennium BC.
