= Div Castle =

Castle in Ardabil Province, Iran

Div Fort
- قلعه دیو

General information
- Type: Castle
- Location: Meshgin Shahr County, Iran
- Renovation cost

Iran National Heritage List
- Official name: Div Fort
- Type: Ruins
- Designated: 1967
- Reference no.: 630
- Conservation organization: Cultural Heritage, Handicrafts and Tourism Organization of Iran

Div Fort (Persian: قلعه دیو) is a historical castle located in Meshgin Shahr County in Ardabil Province, The longevity of this fortress dates back to the Urartu.
