= Remuk Castle =

Castle in Kerman Province, Iran

Remuk castle
- قلعه رموک
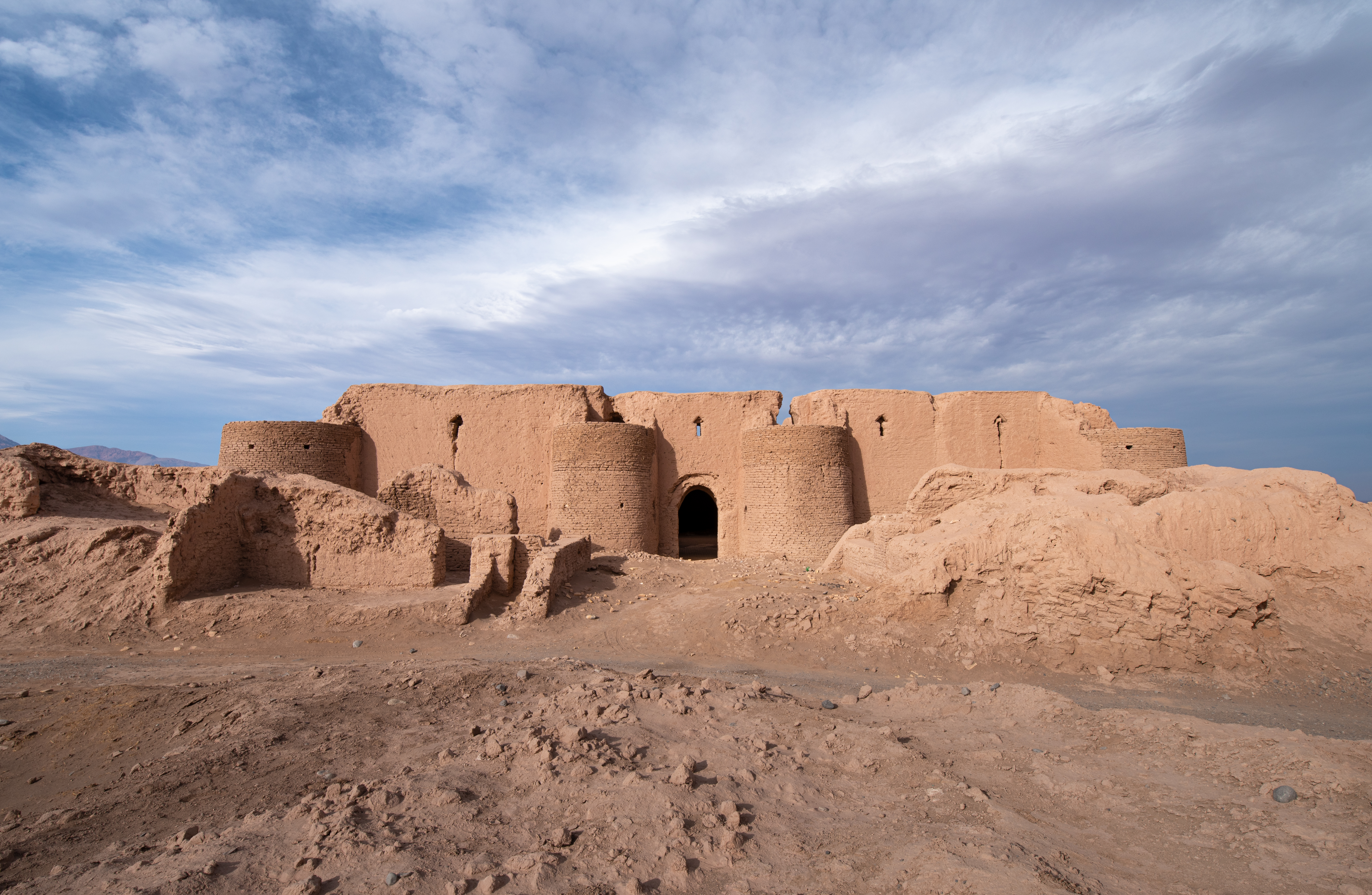
- Interactive map of the Remuk castle area

General information
- Type: Castle
- Location: Kerman County, Iran

Remuk castle (Persian: قلعه رموک) is a historical castle located in Kerman County in Kerman Province, The longevity of this fortress dates back to the Historical periods after Islam.
