= Shian Castle =

Castle in Kermanshah Province, Iran

Shian castle
- قلعه شیان

General information
- Type: Castle
- Location: Eslamabad-e Gharb County, Iran

Shian castle (Persian: قلعه شیان) is a historical castle located in Eslamabad-e Gharb County in Kermanshah Province, The longevity of this fortress dates back to the Prehistoric times of ancient Iran.
