= Safiabad =

Safiabad (Persian: صفي اباد) may refer to:

- Safiabad, Bushehr, a village in Bushehr Province, Iran
- Safiabad, Chaharmahal and Bakhtiari, a village in Chaharmahal and Bakhtiari Province, Iran
- Safiabad, Fars, a village in Fars Province, Iran
- Safiabad, Golestan, a village in Golestan Province, Iran
- Safiabad, Kashan, a village in Isfahan Province, Iran
- Safiabad, Rafsanjan, a village in Kerman Province, Iran
- Safiabad, Shahr-e Babak, a village in Kerman Province, Iran
- Safiabad, Kermanshah, a village in Kermanshah Province, Iran
- Safiabad, Javanrud, a village in Kermanshah Province, Iran
- Safiabad, Khuzestan, a city in Khuzestan Province, Iran
- Safiabad Agricultural and Horticultural Centre, Khuzestan Province, Iran
- Safiabad, Kurdistan, a village in Kurdistan Province, Iran
- Safiabad, Qareh Chay, a village in Markazi Province, Iran
- Safiabad, Shahsavan Kandi, a village in Markazi Province, Iran
- Safiabad, alternate name of Seyfabad, Markazi
- Safiabad, North Khorasan, a city in North Khorasan Province, Iran
- Safiabad, Chenaran, a village in Chenaran County, Razavi Khorasan Province, Iran
- Safiabad, Joghatai, a village in Joghatai County, Razavi Khorasan Province, Iran
- Safiabad, Torqabeh and Shandiz, a village in Torqabeh and Shandiz County, Razavi Khorasan Province, Iran
- Safiabad, Zaveh, a village in Zaveh County, Razavi Khorasan Province, Iran
- Safiabad, Tehran, a village in Tehran Province, Iran
- Safiabad, Yazd, a village in Yazd Province, Iran
- Safiabad, Zanjan, a village in Zanjan Province, Iran
- Safiabad Rural District, in North Khorasan Province, Iran

== See also ==
- Safi Abad, a palace in Behshahr, Mazandaran, Iran
- Shafiabad (disambiguation)
