= Ahmadabad-e Shadjerd =

Ahmadabad-e Shadjerd احمدابادشادجرد
- Village
- Location within Iran
- Coordinates: 34°54′24″N 50°41′56″E
- Country: Iran
- Province: Markazi
- County: Saveh
- Bakhsh: Central
- Rural District: Taraznahid

Population (2006)
  - Total: 24
- Time zone: UTC+3:30 (IRST)
  - Summer (DST): UTC+4:30 (IRDT)

Ahmadabad-e Shadjerd (Persian: احمدابادشادجرد, also Romanized as Aḩmadābād-e Shādjerd; also known as Aḩmadābād-e Shāhjerd) is a village in Taraznahid Rural District, in the Central District of Saveh County, Markazi Province, Iran. At the 2006 census, its population was 24, in 7 families.
