= Rezaabad, Saveh =

Village in Markazi province, Iran

Rezaabad Persian: رضااباد
- Village
- Location within Iran
- Coordinates: 34°58′53″N 50°29′12″E
- Country: Iran
- Province: Markazi
- County: Saveh
- District: Central
- Rural District: Taraznahid

Population (2016)
  - Total: 102
- Time zone: UTC+3:30 (IRST)

Rezaabad (Persian: رضااباد) (Note: Also romanized as Reẕāābād; also known as Rizāābad) is a village in Taraznahid Rural District of the Central District in Saveh County, Markazi province, Iran.

== Demographics ==
=== Population ===
At the time of the 2006 National Census, the village's population was 210 in 52 households. The following census in 2011 counted 122 people in 36 households. The 2016 census measured the population of the village as 102 people in 36 households.
