= Nur Ali Beyk =

Village in Markazi province, Iran

Nur Ali Beyk Persian: نورعلي بيك
- Village
- Location within Iran
- Coordinates: 35°03′08″N 50°17′23″E
- Country: Iran
- Province: Markazi
- County: Saveh
- District: Central
- Rural District: Nur Ali Beyk

Population (2016)
  - Total: 1,769
- Time zone: UTC+3:30 (IRST)

Nur Ali Beyk (Persian: نورعلي بيك) (Note: Also romanized as Nūr ‘Alī Beyk; also known as Nūr ‘Alī Beg and Nūr ‘Alī Beyg) is a village in Nur Ali Beyk Rural District of the Central District in Saveh County, Markazi province, Iran.

== Demographics ==
=== Population ===
At the time of the 2006 National Census, the village's population was 1,399 in 382 households. The following census in 2011 counted 1,632 people in 476 households. The 2016 census measured the population of the village as 1,769 people in 529 households.
