= Yalabad, Markazi =

Village in Markazi province, Iran

Yalabad Persian: يل اباد
- Village
- Location within Iran
- Coordinates: 34°57′15″N 50°18′27″E
- Country: Iran
- Province: Markazi
- County: Saveh
- District: Central
- Rural District: Nur Ali Beyk

Population (2016)
  - Total: 3,761
- Time zone: UTC+3:30 (IRST)

Yalabad (Persian: يل اباد) (Note: Also romanized as Yalābād and Yelābād; also known as Mīlābād and Valābād) is a village in, and the capital of, Nur Ali Beyk Rural District in the Central District of Saveh County, Markazi province, Iran. The previous capital of the rural district was the village of Qardin.

== Demographics ==
=== Population ===
At the time of the 2006 National Census, the village's population was 3,837 in 937 households. The following census in 2011 counted 3,609 people in 972 households. The 2016 census measured the population of the village as 3,761 people in 1,169 households, the most populous in its rural district.
