= Lalain =

Village in Markazi province, Iran

Lalaine Persian: لالائين
- Village
- Location within Iran
- Coordinates: 34°54′26″N 50°18′47″E
- Country: Iran
- Province: Markazi
- County: Saveh
- District: Central
- Rural District: Nur Ali Beyk

Population (2016)
  - Total: 458
- Time zone: UTC+3:30 (IRST)

Lalain (Persian: لالائين) (Note: Also romanized as Lālā’īn; also known as Īralaīn and Lālān) is a village in Nur Ali Beyk Rural District of the Central District in Saveh County, Markazi province, Iran.

== Demographics ==
=== Population ===
At the time of the 2006 National Census, the village's population was 403 in 100 households. The following census in 2011 counted 424 people in 118 households. The 2016 census measured the population of the village as 458 people in 136 households.
