= Qeshlaq-e Anjilavand-e Sofla =

Qeshlaq-e Anjilavand-e Sofla قشلاق انجيلاوندسفلي
- Village
- Location within Iran
- Coordinates: 34°56′29″N 50°37′57″E
- Country: Iran
- Province: Markazi
- County: Saveh
- Bakhsh: Central
- Rural District: Taraznahid

Population (2006)
  - Total: 77
- Time zone: UTC+3:30 (IRST)
  - Summer (DST): UTC+4:30 (IRDT)

Qeshlaq-e Anjilavand-e Sofla (Persian: قشلاق انجيلاوندسفلي, also Romanized as Qeshlāq-e Anjīlāvand-e Soflá; also known as Anjīlavand, Anjīlāvand-e Pā’īn, and Anjīlāvand-e Soflá) is a village in Taraznahid Rural District, in the Central District of Saveh County, Markazi Province, Iran. At the 2006 census, its population was 77, in 21 families.
