= Deh-e Aqa, Saveh =

Deh-e Aqa ده اقا
- Village
- Location within Iran
- Coordinates: 35°13′31″N 50°12′41″E
- Country: Iran
- Province: Markazi
- County: Saveh
- Bakhsh: Central
- Rural District: Shahsavan Kandi

Population (2006)
  - Total: 28
- Time zone: UTC+3:30 (IRST)
  - Summer (DST): UTC+4:30 (IRDT)

Deh-e Aqa (Persian: ده اقا, also Romanized as Deh-e Āqā and Deh Āqā; also known as Deh Sa‘īd) is a village in Shahsavan Kandi Rural District, in the Central District of Saveh County, Markazi Province, Iran. At the 2006 census, its population was 28, in 14 families.
