= Ahmadabad, Saveh =

Village in Markazi province, Iran

Ahmadabad Persian: احمداباد
- Village
- Location within Iran
- Coordinates: 34°59′42″N 50°26′08″E
- Country: Iran
- Province: Markazi
- County: Saveh
- District: Central
- Rural District: Taraznahid

Population (2016)
  - Total: 1,270
- Time zone: UTC+3:30 (IRST)

Ahmadabad (Persian: احمداباد) (Note: Also romanized as Aḩmadābād) is a village in Taraznahid Rural District of the Central District in Saveh County, Markazi province, Iran.

== Demographics ==
=== Population ===
At the time of the 2006 National Census, the village's population was 940 in 236 households. The following census in 2011 counted 1,196 people in 327 households. The 2016 census measured the population of the village as 1,270 people in 357 households.
