= Olusjerd =

Village in Markazi province, Iran

Olusjerd Persian: الوسجرد
- Village
- Location within Iran
- Coordinates: 34°57′27″N 50°20′39″E
- Country: Iran
- Province: Markazi
- County: Saveh
- District: Central
- Rural District: Nur Ali Beyk

Population (2016)
  - Total: 1,480
- Time zone: UTC+3:30 (IRST)

Olusjerd (Persian: الوسجرد) (Note: Also romanized as Aloosjerd, Alūsjerd, and Olūsjerd; also known as Alasjerd, Alūsgerd, and Ulāskird) is a village in Nur Ali Beyk Rural District of the Central District in Saveh County, Markazi province, Iran.

== Demographics ==
=== Population ===
At the time of the 2006 National Census, the village's population was 1,594 in 413 households. The following census in 2011 counted 1,525 people in 431 households. The 2016 census measured the population of the village as 1,480 people in 460 households.
