= Qaleh-ye Shir Khan =

Village in Markazi province, Iran

Qaleh-ye Shir Khan Persian: قلعه شيرخان
- Village
- Location within Iran
- Coordinates: 34°52′44″N 50°25′05″E
- Country: Iran
- Province: Markazi
- County: Saveh
- District: Central
- Rural District: Qareh Chay

Population (2016)
  - Total: 462
- Time zone: UTC+3:30 (IRST)

Qaleh-ye Shir Khan (Persian: قلعه شيرخان) (Note: Also romanized as Qal‘eh Shīr Khān and Qal‘eh-ye Shīr Khān) is a village in Qareh Chay Rural District of the Central District in Saveh County, Markazi province, Iran.

== Demographics ==
=== Population ===
At the time of the 2006 National Census, the village's population was 438 in 85 households. The following census in 2011 counted 417 people in 93 households. The 2016 census measured the population of the village as 462 people in 121 households.
