= Anjilavand =

Anjilavand (Persian: انجيلاوند) may refer to:

- Anjilavand-e Olya
- Anjilavand-e Sofla
