= Taraznahid =

Village in Markazi province, Iran

Taraznahid Persian: طرازناهيد
- Village
- Location within Iran
- Coordinates: 34°58′37″N 50°30′48″E
- Country: Iran
- Province: Markazi
- County: Saveh
- District: Central
- Rural District: Taraznahid

Population (2016)
  - Total: 2,770
- Time zone: UTC+3:30 (IRST)

Taraznahid (Persian: طرازناهيد) (Note: Also romanized as Ţarāz-e Nāhīd and Ţarāznāhīd; also known as Ţarāz-e Nā’īn and Tarāznāīn) is a village in, and the capital of, Taraznahid Rural District in the Central District of Saveh County, Markazi province, Iran.

== Demographics ==
=== Population ===
At the time of the 2006 National Census, the village's population was 3,291 in 590 households. The following census in 2011 counted 2,666 people in 720 households. The 2016 census measured the population of the village as 2,770 people in 803 households.
