= Razin, Markazi =

Village in Markazi province, Iran

Razin Persian: رازین
- Village
- Location within Iran
- Coordinates: 35°01′45″N 49°59′49″E
- Country: Iran
- Province: Markazi
- County: Saveh
- District: Central
- Rural District: Shahsavan Kandi

Population (2016)
  - Total: 257
- Time zone: UTC+3:30 (IRST)

Razin (Persian: رازين) (Note: Also romanized as Rāzīn) is a village in Shahsavan Kandi Rural District of the Central District in Saveh County, Markazi province, Iran.

== Demographics ==
=== Population ===
At the time of the 2006 National Census, the village's population was 93 in 33 households. The following census in 2011 counted 68 people in 23 households. The 2016 census measured the population of the village as 257 people in 82 households.
