= Andis, Markazi =

Village in Markazi province, Iran

Andis Persian: انديس
- Village
- Location within Iran
- Coordinates: 34°48′54″N 50°18′51″E
- Country: Iran
- Province: Markazi
- County: Saveh
- District: Central
- Rural District: Qareh Chay

Population (2016)
  - Total: 343
- Time zone: UTC+3:30 (IRST)

Andis (Persian: انديس) (Note: Also romanized as Andīs; also known as Hendes, Hendīs, Hindis, and Īndes) is a village in Qareh Chay Rural District of the Central District in Saveh County, Markazi province, Iran.

== Demographics ==
=== Population ===
At the time of the 2006 National Census, the village's population was 489 in 139 households. The following census in 2011 counted 394 people in 131 households. The 2016 census measured the population of the village as 343 people in 122 households.
