= Qaleh-ye Abdollah, Markazi =

Qaleh-ye Abdollah قلعه عبداله
- Village
- Location within Iran
- Coordinates: 34°54′22″N 50°35′15″E
- Country: Iran
- Province: Markazi
- County: Saveh
- Bakhsh: Central
- Rural District: Taraznahid

Population (2006)
  - Total: 58
- Time zone: UTC+3:30 (IRST)
  - Summer (DST): UTC+4:30 (IRDT)

Qaleh-ye Abdollah (Persian: قلعه عبداله, also Romanized as Qal‘eh-ye ‘Abdollāh; also known as Qalandarīyeh, Qal’eh Qalandarīyeh, and Qal‘eh-ye ‘Abdollāh Khān) is a village in Taraznahid Rural District, in the Central District of Saveh County, Markazi Province, Iran. At the 2006 census, its population was 58, in 12 families.
