= Shahsavan Kandi =

Shahsavan Kandi or Shah Savan Kandi or Shahsovan Kandi (Persian: شاهسون كندي) may refer to:

- Shahsavan Kandi-ye Sofla
- Shahsavan Kandi Rural District
