= Asiabak-e Band =

Village in Markazi province, Iran

Asiabak-e Band Persian: اسيابك بند
- Village
- Location within Iran
- Coordinates: 34°55′42″N 50°13′19″E
- Country: Iran
- Province: Markazi
- County: Saveh
- District: Central
- Rural District: Nur Ali Beyk

Population (2016)
  - Total: 467
- Time zone: UTC+3:30 (IRST)

Asiabak-e Band (Persian: اسيابك بند) (Note: Also romanized as Āsīābak-e Band; also known as Āsīābak, Āsīāvak Band, Āsīyābak, and Āsyā Bak) is a village in Nur Ali Beyk Rural District of the Central District in Saveh County, Markazi province, Iran.

== Demographics ==
=== Population ===
At the time of the 2006 National Census, the village's population was 412 in 103 households. The following census in 2011 counted 316 people in 84 households. The 2016 census measured the population of the village as 467 people in 147 households.
