= Shafiabad =

Shafiabad (Persian: شفيع اباد) may refer to:

- Shafiabad, Gilan
- Shafiabad, Golestan
- Shafiabad, Kerman
- Shafiabad, Abyek, Qazvin Province
- Shafiabad, Qazvin
- Shafiabad (36°20′ N 50°05′ E), Qazvin
- Shafiabad, Bardaskan, Razavi Khorasan Province
- Shafiabad, Joghatai, Razavi Khorasan Province
- Shafiabad, Nishapur, Razavi Khorasan Province

== See also ==
- Safiabad (disambiguation)
