= Bagh-e Sheykh =

Village in Markazi province, Iran

Bagh-e Sheykh Persian: باغ شيخ
- Village
- Location within Iran
- Coordinates: 34°59′22″N 50°26′57″E
- Country: Iran
- Province: Markazi
- County: Saveh
- District: Central
- Rural District: Taraznahid

Population (2016)
  - Total: 1,250
- Time zone: UTC+3:30 (IRST)

Bagh-e Sheykh (Persian: باغ شيخ) (Note: Also romanized as Bāgh Sheykh and Bāgh-e Sheykh; also known as Bāgh-e Shekh and Bāgh-i-Shaikh) is a village in Taraznahid Rural District of the Central District in Saveh County, Markazi province, Iran.

== Demographics ==
=== Population ===
At the time of the 2006 National Census, the village's population was 1,002 in 231 households. The following census in 2011 counted 1,368 people in 351 households. The 2016 census measured the population of the village as 1,250 people in 350 households.
