= Seqanliq =

Village in Markazi province, Iran

Seqanliq Persian: سقانليق
- Village
- Location within Iran
- Coordinates: 35°03′11″N 50°16′29″E
- Country: Iran
- Province: Markazi
- County: Saveh
- District: Central
- Rural District: Nur Ali Beyk

Population (2016)
  - Total: 1,036
- Time zone: UTC+3:30 (IRST)

Seqanliq (Persian: سقانليق) (Note: Also romanized as Saqānlīq, Seqānlīq, and Soqānlīq; also known as Sāqānlūq) is a village in Nur Ali Beyk Rural District of the Central District in Saveh County, Markazi province, Iran.

== Demographics ==
=== Population ===
At the time of the 2006 National Census, the village's population was 826 in 207 households. The following census in 2011 counted 825 people in 235 households. The 2016 census measured the population of the village as 1,036 people in 319 households.
