= Kaveh Industrial City =

Industrial facility in Markazi province, Iran

Kaveh Industrial City Persian: شهرصنعتي كاوه
- Industrial Facility
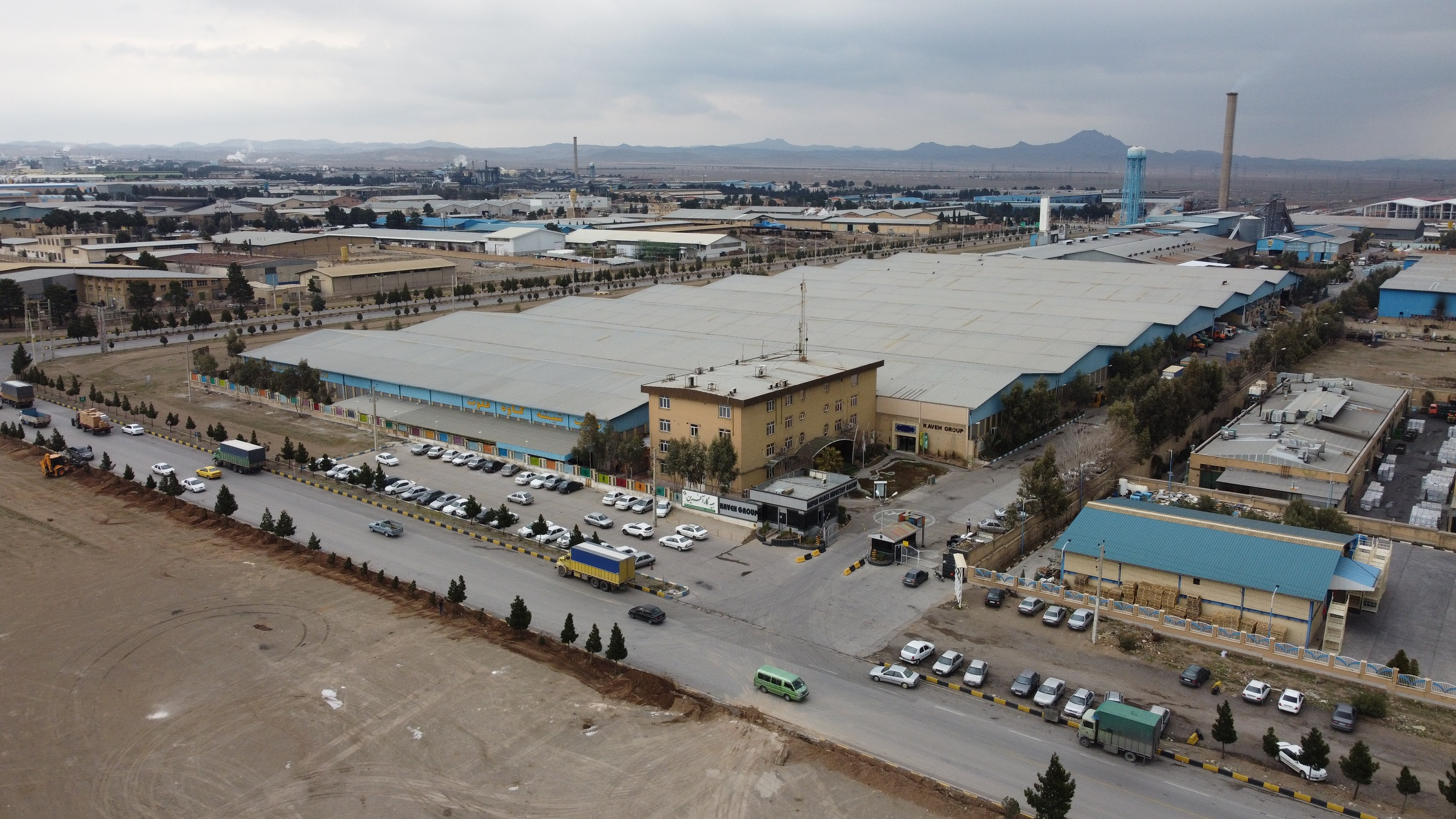
- Kaveh Industrial City

- Location within Iran
- Coordinates: 35°06′34″N 50°24′15″E
- Country: Iran
- Province: Markazi
- County: Saveh
- District: Central
- Rural District: Taraznahid

Population (2016)
  - Total: 2,675
- Time zone: UTC+3:30 (IRST)

Kaveh Industrial City (Note: Shahr-e Sanati-ye Kaveh (Persian: شهرصنعتي كاوه), also romanized as Shahr-e Şanʿatī-ye Kāveh) is an industrial facility in Taraznahid Rural District of the Central District in Saveh County, Markazi province, Iran. It is the largest and oldest of its kind in Iran.

== History ==
Kaveh Industrial City, with an area of approximately 30 square kilometres (12 sq mi), was founded in 1973, and is home to metalworking factories whose workforce, by 2012, exceeded 4,700 employees.

== Demographics ==
=== Population ===
At the time of the 2006 National Census, the facility's population was 2,554 in 773 households. The following census in 2011 counted 2,757 people in 816 households. The 2016 census measured the population of the facility as 2,675 people in 782 households.
