= Holul =

Holul or Halul (Persian: هلول) may refer to:

- Holul, Kermanshah
- Holul, Markazi
- Halul Island, and island in the Persian Gulf belonging to Qatar
