= Nivesht =

Village in Markazi province, Iran

Nivesht Persian: نيوشت
- Village
- Location within Iran
- Coordinates: 35°07′26″N 50°07′53″E
- Country: Iran
- Province: Markazi
- County: Saveh
- District: Central
- Rural District: Shahsavan Kandi

Population (2016)
  - Total: 349
- Time zone: UTC+3:30 (IRST)

Nivesht (Persian: نيوشت) (Note: Also romanized as Nīvasht and Nīvesht; also known as Nīāz) is a village in Shahsavan Kandi Rural District of the Central District in Saveh County, Markazi province, Iran.

== Demographics ==
=== Population ===
At the time of the 2006 National Census, the village's population was 201 in 81 households. The following census in 2011 counted 153 people in 70 households. The 2016 census measured the population of the village as 349 people in 124 households, the most populous in its rural district.
