= Dinarabad, Markazi =

Dinarabad ديناراباد
- Village
- Location within Iran
- Coordinates: 35°08′21″N 50°13′50″E
- Country: Iran
- Province: Markazi
- County: Saveh
- Bakhsh: Central
- Rural District: Nur Ali Beyk

Population (2006)
  - Total: 13
- Time zone: UTC+3:30 (IRST)
  - Summer (DST): UTC+4:30 (IRDT)

Dinarabad (Persian: ديناراباد, also Romanized as Dīnārābād) is a village in Nur Ali Beyk Rural District, in the Central District of Saveh County, Markazi Province, Iran. At the 2006 census, its population was 13, in 4 families.
