= Band-e Chay =

Village in Markazi province, Iran

Band-e Chay Persian: بندچاي
- Village
- Location within Iran
- Coordinates: 34°55′27″N 50°11′02″E
- Country: Iran
- Province: Markazi
- County: Saveh
- District: Central
- Rural District: Nur Ali Beyk

Population (2016)
  - Total: 401
- Time zone: UTC+3:30 (IRST)

Band-e Chay (Persian: بندچاي) (Note: Also romanized as Band Chā’ī and Band-e Chāy; also known as Bandchāl) is a village in Nur Ali Beyk Rural District of the Central District in Saveh County, Markazi province, Iran.

== Demographics ==
=== Population ===
At the time of the 2006 National Census, the village's population was 410 in 114 households. The following census in 2011 counted 353 people in 99 households. The 2016 census measured the population of the village as 401 people in 127 households.
