= Ghazemabad, Qareh Chay =

Ghazemabad غازم اباد
- Village
- Location within Iran
- Coordinates: 34°57′05″N 50°22′32″E
- Country: Iran
- Province: Markazi
- County: Saveh
- Bakhsh: Central
- Rural District: Qareh Chay

Population (2006)
  - Total: 230
- Time zone: UTC+3:30 (IRST)
  - Summer (DST): UTC+4:30 (IRDT)

Ghazemabad (Persian: غازم اباد, also Romanized as Ghāzemābād) is a village in Qareh Chay Rural District, in the Central District of Saveh County, Markazi Province, Iran. At the 2006 census, its population was 230, in 51 families.
