= Deh-e Aqa =

Deh-e Aqa or Deh Aqa (Persian: ده اقا) may refer to:

- Deh Aqa, Kurdistan
- Deh-e Aqa, Lorestan
- Deh-e Aqa, Saveh, Markazi Province
- Deh-e Aqa, Shazand, Markazi Province
