= Aveh, Markazi =

City in Markazi province, Iran

Aveh Persian: آوه
- City
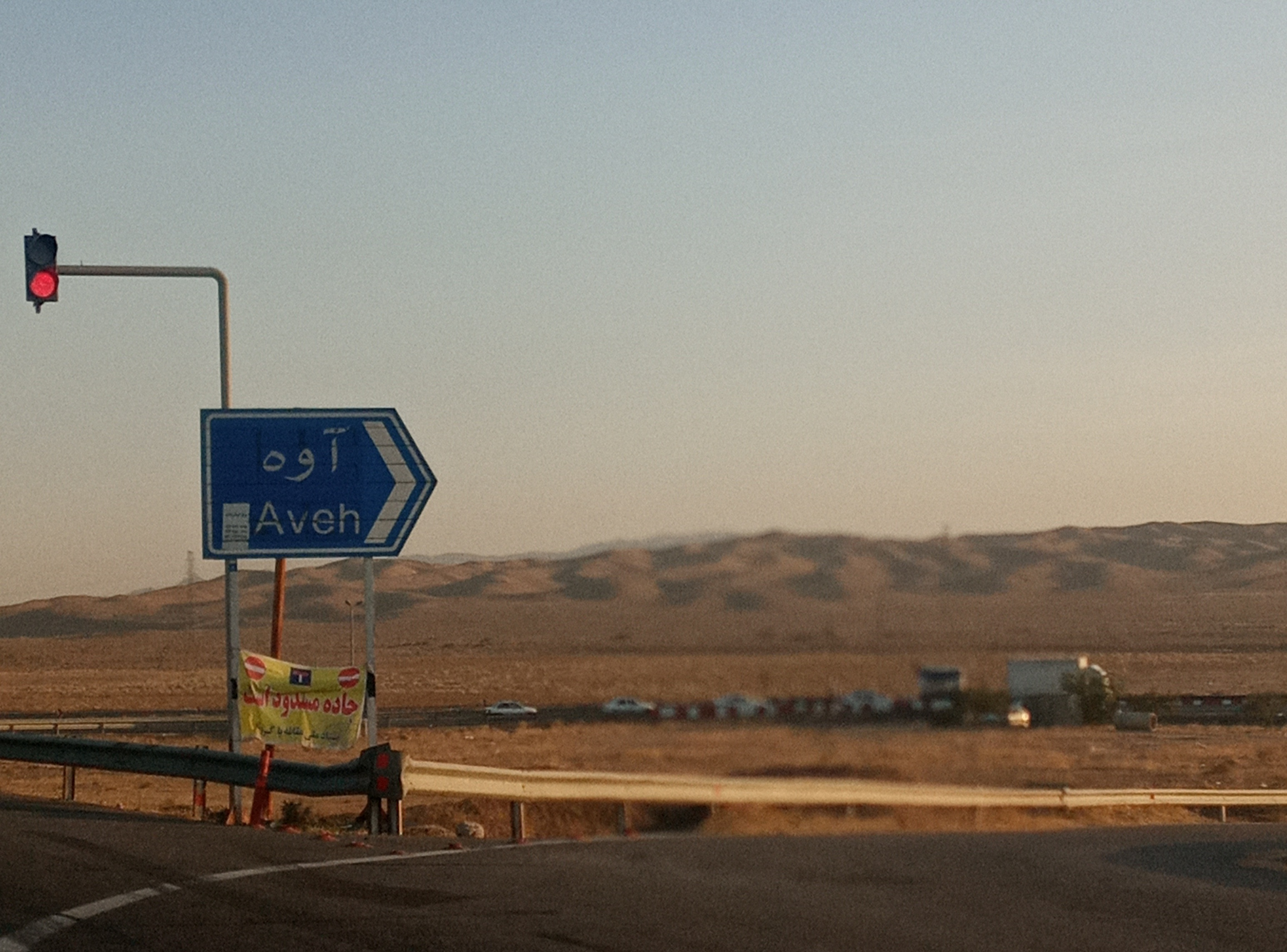
- Sign pointing the way to the city of Aveh

- Location within Iran
- Coordinates: 34°47′34″N 50°25′22″E
- Country: Iran
- Province: Markazi
- County: Saveh
- District: Central
- Established as a city: 2013

Population (2016)
  - Total: 3,906
- Time zone: UTC+3:30 (IRST)

Aveh (Persian: آوه) (Note: Also romanized as Âveh; also known as Abeh and Haveh) is a city in the Central District of Saveh County, Markazi province, Iran.

== Demographics ==
=== Population ===
At the time of the 2006 National Census, Aveh's population was 3,558 in 843 households, when it was a village in Qareh Chay Rural District. The following census in 2011 counted 3,810 people in 1,007 households. The 2016 census measured the population as 3,906 people in 1,101 households, by which time the village had been converted to a city.

== History ==
Aveh is mentioned by several medieval geographers. Yaqut al-Hamawi, writing in the early 1200s, described Aveh as a small town predominantly inhabited by Shi'ites, leading to conflicts with the predominantly Sunni city of Saveh. In the 1300s, Hamdallah Mustawfi remarked on the city's fortifications and pits for storing ice, while also noting that Aveh's bread was known to be poor.
