= Qeytaniyeh =

Village in Markazi province, Iran

Qeytaniyeh Persian: قيطانيه
- Village
- Location within Iran
- Coordinates: 35°02′42″N 50°01′48″E
- Country: Iran
- Province: Markazi
- County: Saveh
- District: Central
- Rural District: Shahsavan Kandi

Population (2016)
  - Total: 125
- Time zone: UTC+3:30 (IRST)

Qeytaniyeh (Persian: قيطانيه) (Note: Also romanized as Qaitānīyeh and Qeyţānīyeh) is a village in, and the capital of, Shahsavan Kandi Rural District in the Central District of Saveh County, Markazi province, Iran.

== Demographics ==
=== Population ===
At the time of the 2006 National Census, the village's population was 166 in 53 households. The following census in 2011 counted 194 people in 51 households. The 2016 census measured the population of the village as 125 people in 49 households.
