= Susan Naqin =

Village in Markazi province, Iran

Susan Naqin Persian: سوسن نقين
- Village
- Location within Iran
- Coordinates: 35°02′10″N 50°00′44″E
- Country: Iran
- Province: Markazi
- County: Saveh
- District: Central
- Rural District: Shahsavan Kandi

Population (2016)
  - Total: 147
- Time zone: UTC+3:30 (IRST)

Susan Naqin (Persian: سوسن نقين) (Note: Also romanized as Sūsan Naqīn; also known as Sūsan Naqī, Sūsan Qīn, Sūseh Naqī, and Susnaqīn) is a village in Shahsavan Kandi Rural District of the Central District in Saveh County, Markazi province, Iran.

== Demographics ==
=== Population ===
At the time of the 2006 National Census, the village's population was 126 in 44 households. The following census in 2011 counted 86 people in 43 households. The 2016 census measured the population of the village as 147 people in 63 households.
