= Mahmudabad, Saveh =

Village in Markazi province, Iran

Mahmudabad Persian: محموداباد
- Village
- Location within Iran
- Coordinates: 34°55′26″N 50°20′45″E
- Country: Iran
- Province: Markazi
- County: Saveh
- District: Central
- Rural District: Nur Ali Beyk

Population (2016)
  - Total: 463
- Time zone: UTC+3:30 (IRST)

Mahmudabad (Persian: محموداباد) (Note: Also romanized as Maḩmūdābād) is a village in Nur Ali Beyk Rural District of the Central District in Saveh County, Markazi province, Iran.

== Demographics ==
=== Population ===
At the time of the 2006 National Census, the village's population was 465 in 113 households. The following census in 2011 counted 418 people in 118 households. The 2016 census measured the population of the village as 463 people in 131 households.
