= Shahsavan Kandi-ye Sofla =

Shahsavan Kandi-ye Sofla شاهسون كندي سفلي
- Village
- Location within Iran
- Coordinates: 35°02′53″N 50°04′54″E
- Country: Iran
- Province: Markazi
- County: Saveh
- Bakhsh: Central
- Rural District: Shahsavan Kandi

Population (2006)
  - Total: 74
- Time zone: UTC+3:30 (IRST)
  - Summer (DST): UTC+4:30 (IRDT)

Shahsavan Kandi-ye Sofla (Persian: شاهسون كندي سفلي, also Romanized as Shāhsavan Kandī-ye Soflá; also known as Shāh Savan Kandī and Shāhsavan Kandī-ye Mīānī) is a village in Shahsavan Kandi Rural District, in the Central District of Saveh County, Markazi Province, Iran. At the 2006 census, its population was 74, in 33 families.
