= Saveh Refugee Camp =

Refugee camp in Markazi province, Iran

Saveh Refugee Camp Persian: اردوگاه افغاني
- Refugee Camp
- Location within Iran
- Coordinates: 35°01′24″N 50°35′15″E
- Country: Iran
- Province: Markazi
- County: Saveh
- District: Central
- Rural District: Taraznahid

Population (2016)
  - Total: 3,639
- Time zone: UTC+3:30 (IRST)

Saveh Refugee Camp (Note: Ardugah-e Afghani (Persian: اردوگاه افغاني), also romanized as Ārdūgāh-e Āfghānī) is a refugee camp in Taraznahid Rural District of the Central District in Saveh County, Markazi province, Iran.

== Background ==
The camp was established in the late 1980s to house refugees fleeing from the Soviet invasion of Afganistan, consisting only of some tents, and was financially fully supported by the Iranian government and relief agencies until 2000, after which the refugees were given the responsibility of paying for public services. As it became clear that the residents of the camp would not be returning home soon, houses were erected for them.

Following the United States invasion of Afghanistan, it became possible for some of the refugees to return home.

== Demographics ==
=== Population ===
At the time of the 2006 National Census, the refugee camp's population was 3,727 in 649 households. The following census in 2011 counted 4,996 people in 854 households. The 2016 census measured the population of the camp as 3,639 people in 808 households, the most populous locality in its rural district.

In 2016 the population was reported as 4,987, consisting of five different ethnic Afghan groups, with a Sunni-Shia split of 80% to 20%.

As of 2022 it was the second-largest refugee settlement in Iran.
