= Holul, Markazi =

Holul هلول
- Village
- Location within Iran
- Coordinates: 34°55′47″N 50°19′16″E
- Country: Iran
- Province: Markazi
- County: Saveh
- Bakhsh: Central
- Rural District: Nur Ali Beyk

Population (2006)
  - Total: 356
- Time zone: UTC+3:30 (IRST)
  - Summer (DST): UTC+4:30 (IRDT)

Holul (Persian: هلول, also Romanized as Holūl and Halūl; also known as Khalīlī and Khalūl) is a village in Nur Ali Beyk Rural District, in the Central District of Saveh County, Markazi Province, Iran. At the 2006 census, its population was 356, in 75 families.
