= Abbasabad, Saveh =

Village in Markazi province, Iran

Abbasabad Persian: عباس اباد
- Village
- Location within Iran
- Coordinates: 34°52′49″N 50°21′21″E
- Country: Iran
- Province: Markazi
- County: Saveh
- District: Central
- Rural District: Qareh Chay

Population (2016)
  - Total: 424
- Time zone: UTC+3:30 (IRST)

Abbasabad (Persian: عباس اباد) (Note: Also romanized as ‘Abbāsābād; also known as Qal‘eh-ye Farzī) is a village in Qareh Chay Rural District of the Central District in Saveh County, Markazi province, Iran.

== Demographics ==
=== Population ===
At the time of the 2006 National Census, the village's population was 440 in 97 households. The following census in 2011 counted 390 people in 101 households. The 2016 census measured the population of the village as 424 people in 125 households.
