= Noshveh =

Village in Markazi province, Iran

Noshveh Persian: نشوه
- Village
- Location within Iran
- Coordinates: 35°12′10″N 50°12′02″E
- Country: Iran
- Province: Markazi
- County: Saveh
- District: Central
- Rural District: Shahsavan Kandi

Population (2016)
  - Total: 87
- Time zone: UTC+3:30 (IRST)

Noshveh (Persian: نشوه) (Note: Also romanized as Neshvah) is a village in Shahsavan Kandi Rural District of the Central District in Saveh County, Markazi province, Iran.

== Demographics ==
=== Population ===
At the time of the 2006 National Census, the village's population was 94 in 32 households. The following census in 2011 counted 153 people in 63 households. The 2016 census measured the population of the village as 87 people in 34 households.
