= Emamabad, Markazi =

Village in Markazi province, Iran

Emamabad Persian: امام اباد
- Village
- Location within Iran
- Coordinates: 34°53′07″N 50°26′52″E
- Country: Iran
- Province: Markazi
- County: Saveh
- District: Central
- Rural District: Qareh Chay

Population (2016)
  - Total: 439
- Time zone: UTC+3:30 (IRST)

Emamabad (Persian: امام اباد) (Note: Also romanized as Emāmābād; also known as Emāmābād-e Kūnāb, Gūnāb, Konāb, Koonab, and KunĀb) is a village in Qareh Chay Rural District of the Central District in Saveh County, Markazi province, Iran.

== Demographics ==
=== Population ===
At the time of the 2006 National Census, the village's population was 356 in 77 households. The following census in 2011 counted 373 people in 83 households. The 2016 census measured the population of the village as 439 people in 106 households.
