= Jafarabad, Saveh =

Village in Markazi province, Iran

Jafarabad Persian: جعفراباد
- Village
- Location within Iran
- Coordinates: 35°08′06″N 50°25′58″E
- Country: Iran
- Province: Markazi
- County: Saveh
- District: Central
- Rural District: Taraznahid

Population (2016)
  - Total: 117
- Time zone: UTC+3:30 (IRST)

Jafarabad (Persian: جعفراباد) (Note: Also romanized as Ja‘farābād) is a village in Taraznahid Rural District of the Central District in Saveh County, Markazi province, Iran.

== Demographics ==
=== Population ===
At the time of the 2006 National Census, the village's population was 88 in 25 households. The following census in 2011 counted 43 people in 17 households. The 2016 census measured the population of the village as 117 people in 37 households.
