= Harisan =

Village in Markazi province, Iran

Harisan Persian: هريسان
- Village
- Location within Iran
- Coordinates: 34°54′38″N 50°24′04″E
- Country: Iran
- Province: Markazi
- County: Saveh
- District: Central
- Rural District: Qareh Chay

Population (2016)
  - Total: 677
- Time zone: UTC+3:30 (IRST)

Harisan (Persian: هريسان) (Note: Also romanized as Harīsān; also known as Harsān) is a village in, and the capital of, Qareh Chay Rural District in the Central District of Saveh County, Markazi province, Iran.

== Demographics ==
=== Population ===
At the time of the 2006 National Census, the village's population was 686 in 168 households. The following census in 2011 counted 703 people in 189 households. The 2016 census measured the population of the village as 677 people in 205 households.
