= Haqaniyeh =

Village in Markazi province, Iran

Haqaniyeh Persian: حقانيه
- Village
- Location within Iran
- Coordinates: 35°00′41″N 50°06′19″E
- Country: Iran
- Province: Markazi
- County: Saveh
- District: Central
- Rural District: Shahsavan Kandi

Population (2016)
  - Total: 85
- Time zone: UTC+3:30 (IRST)

Haqaniyeh (Persian: حقانيه) (Note: Also romanized as Ḩaqānīyeh and Ḩaqqānīyeh) is a village in Shahsavan Kandi Rural District of the Central District in Saveh County, Markazi province, Iran.

== Demographics ==
=== Population ===
At the time of the 2006 National Census, the village's population was 80 in 23 households. The following census in 2011 counted 53 people in 19 households. The 2016 census measured the population of the village as 85 people in 27 households.
