= Palangabad, Markazi =

Village in Markazi province, Iran

Palangabad Persian: پلنگ اباد
- Village
- Location within Iran
- Coordinates: 35°00′15″N 49°57′34″E
- Country: Iran
- Province: Markazi
- County: Saveh
- District: Central
- Rural District: Shahsavan Kandi

Population (2016)
  - Total: 77
- Time zone: UTC+3:30 (IRST)

Palangabad (Persian: پلنگ اباد) (Note: Also romanized as Palangābād) is a village in Shahsavan Kandi Rural District of the Central District in Saveh County, Markazi province, Iran.

== Demographics ==
=== Population ===
At the time of the 2006 National Census, the village's population was 51 in 21 households. The following census in 2011 counted 18 people in 10 households. The 2016 census measured the population of the village as 77 people in 34 households.
