= Qareh Chay, Markazi =

Village in Markazi province, Iran

Qareh Chay Persian: قره چاي
- Village
- Location within Iran
- Coordinates: 34°53′03″N 50°23′48″E
- Country: Iran
- Province: Markazi
- County: Saveh
- District: Central
- Rural District: Qareh Chay

Population (2016)
  - Total: 745
- Time zone: UTC+3:30 (IRST)

Qareh Chay (Persian: قره چاي), (Note: Also romanized as Qarah Chāy and Qareh Chāy; also known as Ostūj and Qal‘eh-ye Kordhā) is a village in Qareh Chay Rural District of the Central District in Saveh County, Markazi province, Iran.

== Demographics ==
=== Population ===
At the time of the 2006 National Census, the village's population was 410 in 114 households. The following census in 2011 counted 353 people in 99 households. The 2016 census measured the population of the village as 401 people in 127 households, the most populous in its rural district.
