= Samavak, Markazi =

Samavak سماوك
- Village
- Location within Iran
- Coordinates: 35°02′07″N 50°05′42″E
- Country: Iran
- Province: Markazi
- County: Saveh
- Bakhsh: Central
- Rural District: Shahsavan Kandi

Population (2006)
  - Total: 9
- Time zone: UTC+3:30 (IRST)
  - Summer (DST): UTC+4:30 (IRDT)

Samavak (Persian: سماوك, also Romanized as Samāvak) is a village in Shahsavan Kandi Rural District, in the Central District of Saveh County, Markazi Province, Iran. At the 2006 census, its population was 9, in 5 families.
