= Sharaflu =

Village in Markazi province, Iran

Sharaflu Persian: شرفلو
- Village
- Location within Iran
- Coordinates: 34°58′55″N 50°16′37″E
- Country: Iran
- Province: Markazi
- County: Saveh
- District: Central
- Rural District: Nur Ali Beyk

Population (2016)
  - Total: 340
- Time zone: UTC+3:30 (IRST)

Sharaflu (Persian: شرفلو) (Note: Also romanized as Sharaflū; formerly known as Mazraeh-ye Sharaflu) is a village in Nur Ali Beyk Rural District of the Central District in Saveh County, Markazi province, Iran.

== Demographics ==
=== Population ===
At the time of the 2006 National Census, the village's population was 505 in 114 households. The following census in 2011 counted 410 people in 109 households. The 2016 census measured the population of the village as 340 people in 111 households.
