= Qardin =

Village in Markazi province, Iran

Qardin Persian: قردين
- Village
- Location within Iran
- Coordinates: 34°56′35″N 50°17′40″E
- Country: Iran
- Province: Markazi
- County: Saveh
- District: Central
- Rural District: Nur Ali Beyk

Population (2016)
  - Total: 1,134
- Time zone: UTC+3:30 (IRST)

Qardin (Persian: قردين), also romanized as Qardīn, is a village in, and the former capital of, Nur Ali Beyk Rural District in the Central District of Saveh County, Markazi province, Iran. The capital has been transferred to the village of Yalabad.

== Demographics ==
=== Population ===
At the time of the 2006 National Census, the village's population was 1,092 in 294 households. The following census in 2011 counted 1,213 people in 335 households. The 2016 census measured the population of the village as 1,134 people in 351 households.
