= Anjilavand-e Olya =

Anjilavand-e Olya انجيلاوندعليا
- Village
- Location within Iran
- Coordinates: 34°57′21″N 50°34′38″E
- Country: Iran
- Province: Markazi
- County: Saveh
- Bakhsh: Central
- Rural District: Taraznahid

Population (2006)
  - Total: 126
- Time zone: UTC+3:30 (IRST)
  - Summer (DST): UTC+4:30 (IRDT)

Anjilavand-e Olya (Persian: انجيلاوندعليا, also Romanized as Anjīlāvand-e ‘Olyā; also known as Anjīlāvand, Anjīlāvand-e Bālā, Anjīlāvand-e Kohneh, Anjīlāvand Khūneh, and Anjīlāvand Kūhneh) is a village in Taraznahid Rural District, in the Central District of Saveh County, Markazi Province, Iran. At the 2006 census, its population was 126, in 39 families.
