= Bolagh =

Village in Markazi province, Iran

Bolagh Persian: بلاغ
- Village
- Location within Iran
- Country: Iran
- Province: Markazi
- County: Saveh
- District: Central
- Rural District: Taraznahid

Population (2016)
  - Total: 78
- Time zone: UTC+3:30 (IRST)

Bolagh (Persian: بلاغ) (Note: Also romanized as Bolāgh) is a village in Taraznahid Rural District of the Central District in Saveh County, Markazi province, Iran.

== Demographics ==
=== Population ===
At the time of the 2006 National Census, the village's population was 53 in 11 households. The following census in 2011 counted 64 people in 20 households. The 2016 census measured the population of the village as 78 people in 28 households.
