= Sinak, Markazi =

Sinak سينك
- Village
- Location within Iran
- Coordinates: 34°52′11″N 50°36′48″E
- Country: Iran
- Province: Markazi
- County: Saveh
- Bakhsh: Central
- Rural District: Taraznahid

Population (2006)
  - Total: 101
- Time zone: UTC+3:30 (IRST)
  - Summer (DST): UTC+4:30 (IRDT)

Sinak (Persian: سينك, also Romanized as Sīnak) is a village in Taraznahid Rural District, in the Central District of Saveh County, Markazi Province, Iran. At the 2006 census, its population was 101, in 21 families.
