= Qaleh Abdollah =

Qaleh Abdollah or Qaleh-ye Abdollah (Persian: قلعه عبداله), also rendered as Qaleh Abdullah, may refer to:

- Qaleh-ye Abdollah, Fars
- Qaleh Abdollah, Isfahan
- Qaleh-ye Abdollah, Markazi
- Qaleh Abdollah, Semnan
