= Dinarabad =

Dinarabad (Persian: ديناراباد) may refer to:

- Dinarabad, Hamadan
- Dinarabad, Lorestan
- Dinarabad, Markazi
- Dinarabad, Tehran
- Dinarabad, Shahriar, Tehran
