= Ghazemabad =

Ghazemabad (Persian: غازم اباد) may refer to:

- Ghazemabad, Saveh
- Ghazemabad, Nowbaran
