= Owjan, Markazi =

Village in Markazi province, Iran

Owjan Persian: اوجان
- Village
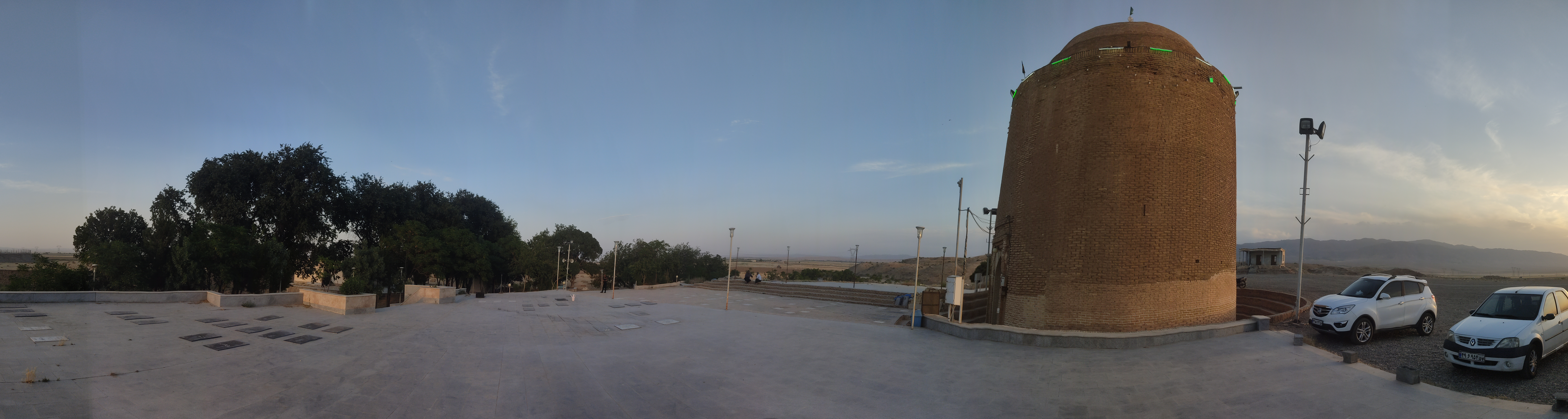
- Emamzadeh Abdollah in the village of Owjan

- Location within Iran
- Coordinates: 34°52′10″N 50°22′39″E
- Country: Iran
- Province: Markazi
- County: Saveh
- District: Central
- Rural District: Qareh Chay

Population (2016)
  - Total: 560
- Time zone: UTC+3:30 (IRST)

Owjan (Persian: اوجان) (Note: Also romanized as Owjān) is a village in Qareh Chay Rural District of the Central District in Saveh County, Markazi province, Iran.

== Demographics ==
=== Population ===
At the time of the 2006 National Census, the village's population was 668 in 149 households. The following census in 2011 counted 544 people in 146 households. The 2016 census measured the population of the village as 560 people in 152 households.
