= Safiabad, Shahsavan Kandi =

Village in Markazi province, Iran

Safiabad Persian: صفي اباد
- Village
- Location within Iran
- Coordinates: 35°02′32″N 49°57′24″E
- Country: Iran
- Province: Markazi
- County: Saveh
- District: Central
- Rural District: Shahsavan Kandi

Population (2016)
  - Total: 110
- Time zone: UTC+3:30 (IRST)

Safiabad (Persian: صفي اباد) (Note: Also romanized as Şafīābād) is a village in Shahsavan Kandi Rural District of the Central District in Saveh County, Markazi province, Iran.

== Demographics ==
=== Population ===
At the time of the 2006 National Census, the village's population was 45 in 20 households. The following census in 2011 counted 18 people in 10 households. The 2016 census measured the population of the village as 110 people in 37 households.
