= Seyfabad, Markazi =

Village in Markazi province, Iran

Seyfabad Persian: سيف اباد
- Village
- Location within Iran
- Coordinates: 34°53′31″N 50°20′44″E
- Country: Iran
- Province: Markazi
- County: Saveh
- District: Central
- Rural District: Qareh Chay

Population (2016)
  - Total: 405
- Time zone: UTC+3:30 (IRST)

Seyfabad (Persian: سيف اباد) (Note: Also romanized as Seyfābād; also known as Şafīābād and Saifābād) is a village in Qareh Chay Rural District of the Central District in Saveh County, Markazi province, Iran.

== Demographics ==
=== Population ===
At the time of the 2006 National Census, the village's population was 426 in 97 households. The following census in 2011 counted 419 people in 115 households. The 2016 census measured the population of the village as 405 people in 117 households.
