= Samavak =

Samavak (Persian: سماوك) may refer to:

- Samavak, Hamadan
- Samavak, Markazi
