= Sinak =

Sinak or Senak (Persian: سينك) may refer to:

== Indonesia ==
- Sinak, a district of Puncak Regency

== Iran ==
- Sinak, Markazi, a village in Markazi Province
- Sinak, Qazvin, a village in Qazvin Province
- Sinak, Tehran, a village in Tehran Province
