= Owjan =

Owjan (Persian: اوجان) may refer to:

- Owjan alternate name of Bostanabad, East Azerbaijan Province
- Owjan, Markazi
- Owjan, South Khorasan
