= Jameh Mosque of Saveh =

Mosque in Saveh, Iran

- مسجد جامع ساوه
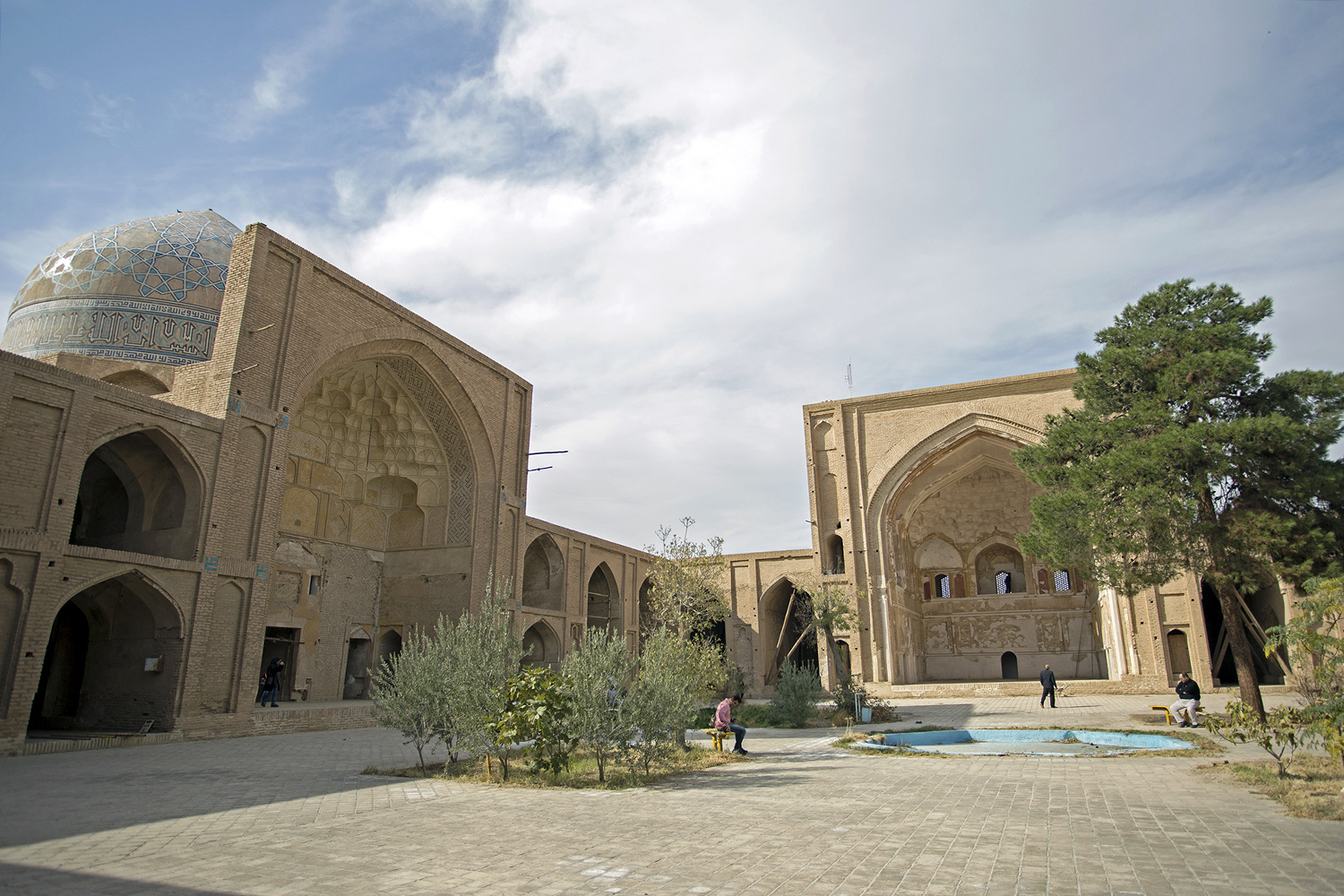

- Location of the mosque in Iran

Religion
- Affiliation: Shia Islam
- Ecclesiastical or organisational status: Friday mosque
- Status: Active

Location
- Location: Saveh, Saveh County, Markazi province
- Country: Iran
- Coordinates: 35°00′N 50°21′E

Architecture
- Type: Mosque architecture
- Style: Abbasid; Seljuk; Ilkhanid; Safavid
- Completed: 10th century (original structure); 1110 CE (minaret, mosque); 1319 CE (mihrab, south, iwan, west); 1530 CE (dome, iwan, south)

Specifications
- Interior area: 4,200 m^{2} (45,000 sq ft)
- Dome: One
- Dome height (outer): 16 m (52 ft)
- Dome dia. (outer): 14 m (46 ft)
- Minarets: Two (one extant; one destroyed)
- Minaret height: 14 m (46 ft)
- Materials: Adobe; mud; bricks; plaster

Iran National Heritage List
- Official name: Friday Mosque of Saveh
- Type: Friday Mosque
- Designated: 1932
- Reference no.: 156
- Conservation organization: Cultural Heritage, Handicrafts and Tourism Organization of Iran

The Jameh Mosque of Saveh (Persian: مسجد جامع ساوه, romanized: Masjed-e-Jāmeh Sāveh), also known as the Friday Mosque of Sava, is a Shi'ite Friday mosque, located in Saveh, Saveh County, in the province of Markazi, Iran. The monument preserves a long sequence of construction phases from the early Islamic centuries through the Seljuk, Ilkhanid and Safavid periods, and archaeological investigation has identified earlier hypostyle mosques beneath the standing structure. The mosque was added to the Iran National Heritage List on 6 January 1932, administered by the Cultural Heritage, Handicrafts and Tourism Organization of Iran.

== History ==
=== Construction ===
Saveh lies in the historic region of Jibal, a name used by medieval Islamic geographers for the uplands of western–central Iran, on routes linking Ray, Hamadan, Isfahan, Khurasan and Baghdad. Medieval geographers describe it as a prosperous walled town with good water and caravan facilities, inhabited mainly by Sunni Shafi'is, in contrast to nearby Shi'i towns such as Avaj. The city prospered especially under the Seljuks, serving as a winter station for rulers and atabegs, making it a natural setting for a major Friday mosque.

Archaeology by the Iranian Cultural Heritage Organization (ICHO) shows that the mosque stands above at least two earlier congregational buildings. The earliest, dating to the 8th–9th centuries, was a hypostyle mosque built largely in stamped earth (chīna) with closely spaced piers. A second hypostyle mosque in mud-brick followed, three bays deep on several sides of a nearly square courtyard; the northeast range of this phase has been largely lost.

In the Seljuk period, early in the 12th century, a domed chamber was added on the qibla (south-west) side of the courtyard. Three earlier piers were removed to create a square chamber of about 10.5 x 10.5 m with three openings on each side except the qibla wall. The form resembles other Seljuk domed bays of Jibal such as Golpayegan and Qazvin. A freestanding brick minaret east of the mosque bears an inscription dated 504 AH (1110–1111 CE), naming the patron Abu Shugha Muhammad ibn Malikshah and invoking the Abbasid caliph Al-Mustazhir (r. 1094-1118). This suggests that the minaret and the dome chamber belong to the same Seljuk phase.

Saveh suffered heavily in the Mongol invasions of the early 13th century. The scholar Yaqut al-Hamawi (died 1229) reports that the mosque's library (kitabkhana) was burned, although archaeological traces have not been confirmed. The city revived under the Ilkhanids; high-ranking officials from Saveh served at court, and the historian and geographer Hamdallah Mustawfi (died after 1339/1340) described major rebuilding of its walls and suburbs.

In the Ilkhanid period, probably in the early 14th century, the mosque was substantially remodelled. A very large iwan was built on the northwest side of the courtyard, about 15 m high and over 13 m deep, with a four-centred arch framed by engaged columns. Two rows of hypostyle piers were removed to make space for it, and surviving piers were strengthened with brick jackets. Traces of an inscription name the builder "Shahvird" and give an abjad date around 720/1320–21.

A small cruciform domed chamber with muqarnas niches was added in the southwest corner, likely serving as an oratory or teaching space comparable to those at Natanz and Torbat-e Shaykh Jam.

During the Safavid period, when Shah Ismail I (r. 1501-1524) and his son and successor Shah Tahmasp I r. 1524-1576) promoted Twelver Shi'ism, Saveh again attracted patronage. A new outer shell was added over the earlier dome, creating a tall double-shell profile with decorative tilework; the dome chamber interior was redecorated in plaster and tile, with inscriptions dated 922 AH (1516–1517 CE) naming the architect Mir Ahmad ibn Mir Haj of Qom.

On the courtyard side, a new qibla iwan was built in front of the dome chamber, framed by muqarnas and tile inscriptions, including a long dedicatory band dated 936 AH (1539–1540 CE) naming the builder Shakyh Jamal ibn Jamal al-Din al-Qumi.

=== Recent history ===
Systematic documentation of the mosque began in the 1930s, when the American art historian and Iranologist Arthur Pope (died 1969), lacking archaeological data, considered it essentially a Safavid building. Conservation work began in 1349/1971, followed in the 1980s–1990s by archaeological investigations clarifying the early phases, including the stamped-earth foundations, hypostyle hall and Ilkhanid iwan.

Excavations in 2000 exposed parts of a former adobe city wall and Ilkhanid-period structures around the mosque. In 2023, a mud-brick with an ink inscription attributed to Imam Ali al-Rida was reported, although its authenticity remains uncertain. Large parts of the northeast range and the original entrance remain unexcavated.

== Architecture ==
=== Layout and features ===
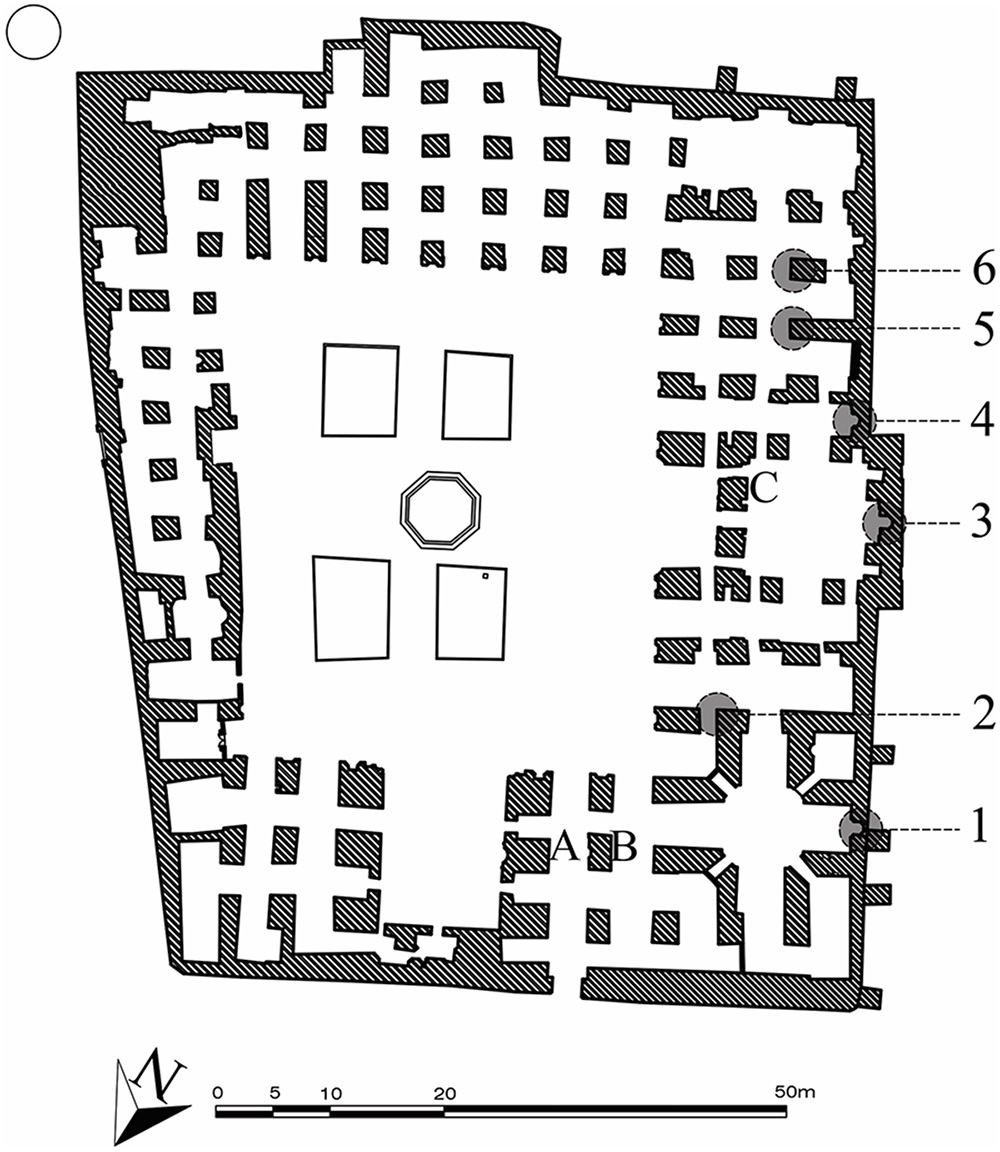
Plan of the mosque and location of its mihrabs

The mosque stands on the south-eastern edge of historic Saveh, near the former city wall and at some distance from the bazaar. The complex occupies about 5,400 m². The courtyard was originally close to a square of around 43 x 43 m and was surrounded by arcades and prayer halls built in successive phases.

The earliest hypostyle plan had covered galleries three bays deep with eight bays along the qibla side but no widened axial bay, resembling very early hypostyle mosques such as Susa. The surviving piers are built of large mud-bricks on chīna foundations with later brick facings; fragments of the original mud-brick barrel vaults survive embedded in later walls. The Seljuk dome chamber is square at the base and transitions to the dome through pointed arches and muqarnas squinches. The present dome is double-shelled: a hemispherical inner shell (c. 15.9 m high) and a taller outer shell (c. 21.9 m) supported by radial brick walls (khashkhashi).

The freestanding cylindrical brick minaret is about 4.5 m in diameter and 15.9 m high in its truncated state. It contains a spiral stair and three inscription bands naming the patron and date and invoking the Abbasid caliph al-Mustazhir. The Ilkhanid northwest iwan dominates the courtyard. Its thick side walls contain staircases to upper galleries, and originally held three tall arched openings on each side, later reduced or blocked. A semi-domed vault with muqarnas covers the rear of the iwan, and transverse arches span the front bay. In the Safavid period, a new qibla iwan was built before the dome chamber, flanked by two-storey corridors. Three openings in the rear wall lead into the dome chamber.

=== Decoration ===
The mosque preserves decorative work from multiple periods, including carved stucco, painted plaster, brickwork and tile. Early elements include a flat plaster mihrab on the east side of the dome chamber with Kufic and Naskh inscriptions (Qur'an 3, 9, 36), resembling inscriptions from Nain and Nishapur. A second flat mihrab on the northwest side bears a Thuluth inscription of Qur'an 3:18. A small mihrab discovered in the northeast excavations, stylistically dated to the 12th century, bears vegetal motifs and inscriptions including al-mulk li-llāh.

Fragments of Seljuk stucco dado decoration survive in the dome chamber, consisting of interlaced star patterns with vegetal motifs and inscriptions repeating al-mulk. The Seljuk-era minaret displays a combination of decorative brickwork and stucco elements. The Ilkhanid northwest iwan contains traces of painted plaster with vegetal designs and Kufic Qur'anic inscriptions, including the name "Ali", a motif common after the Ilkhanid conversion to Shi'ism.

Safavid decoration is concentrated around the dome chamber and qibla iwan. The dome interior is covered with geometric tilework (ṭarḥ-i girra). Three stacked Kufic bands on the drum proclaim doctrinal formulae on God, the Islamic prophet Mohammad, and the authority of Ali. Below, a wide Thuluth inscription band dated 922 AH (1516–1517 CE) encircles the chamber, and sixteen medallions contain salawat to the Prophet, Fatima and the Twelve Imams.

The main Safavid mihrab on the qibla wall combines carved stucco, coloured plaster and muqarnas with inscriptions quoting Qur'an 2, 17, 19 and 62; the dado is faced with blue hexagonal tiles. The qibla iwan's rear wall combines muqarnas, moulded plaster panels with the word Allah, and a square Kufic (bannā'i) tile inscription spelling Allah, Muhammad and Ali. A long glazed Thuluth dedicatory band dated 936 AH (1539–1540 CE) runs below it.

== Gallery ==
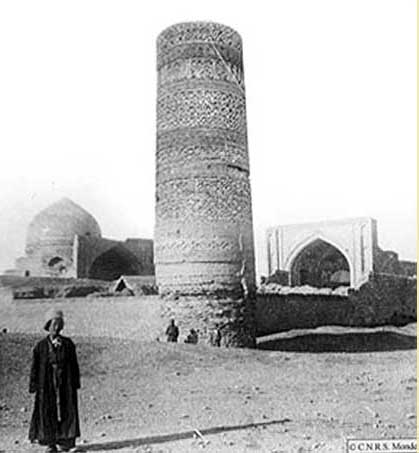

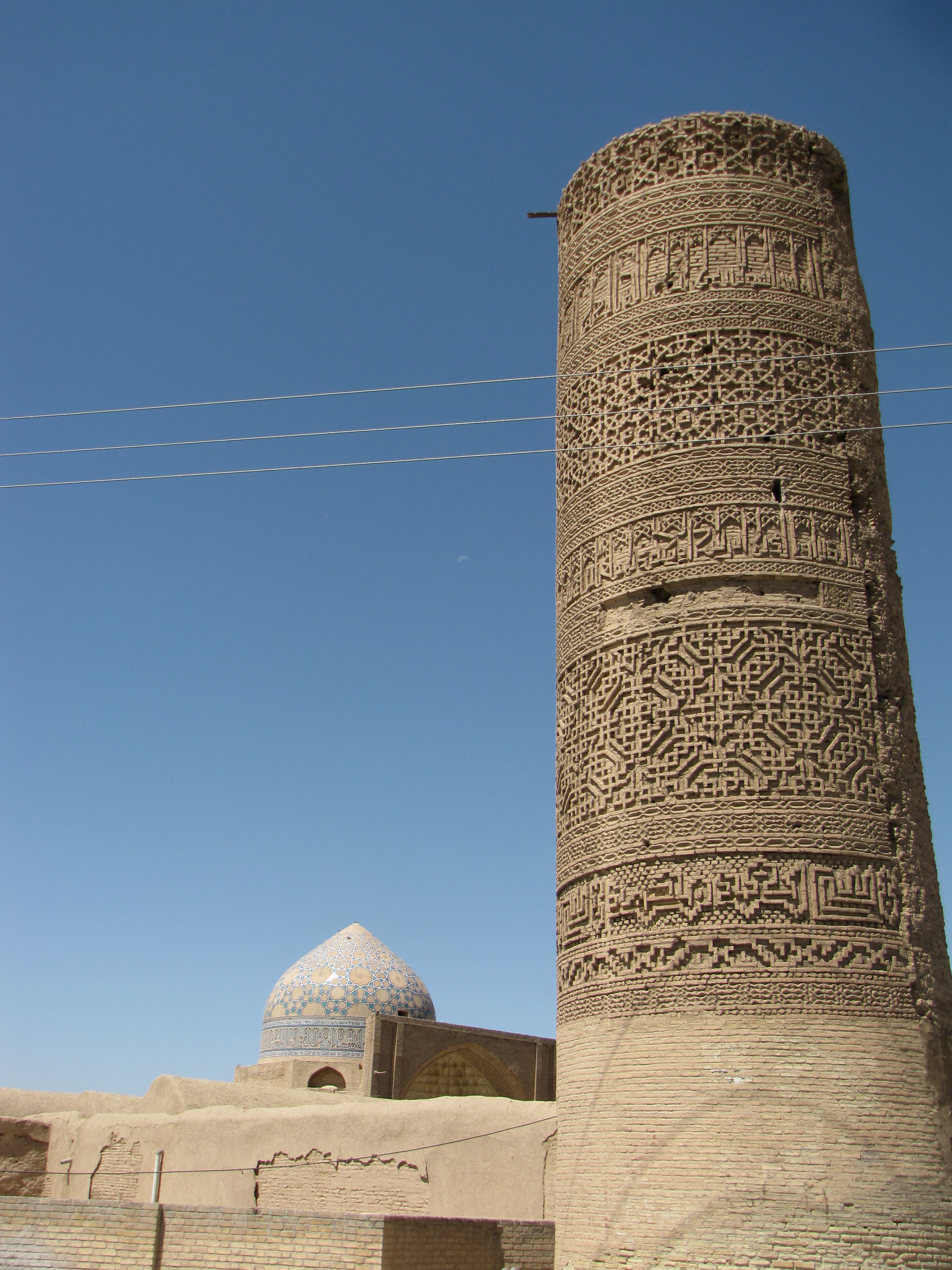

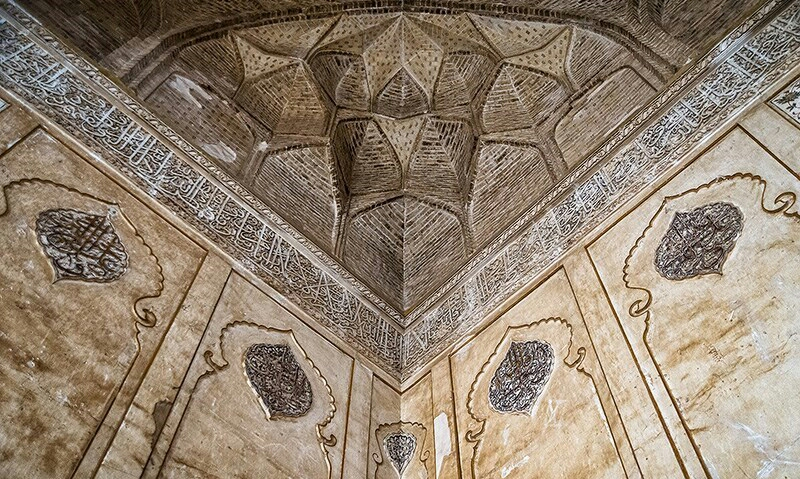

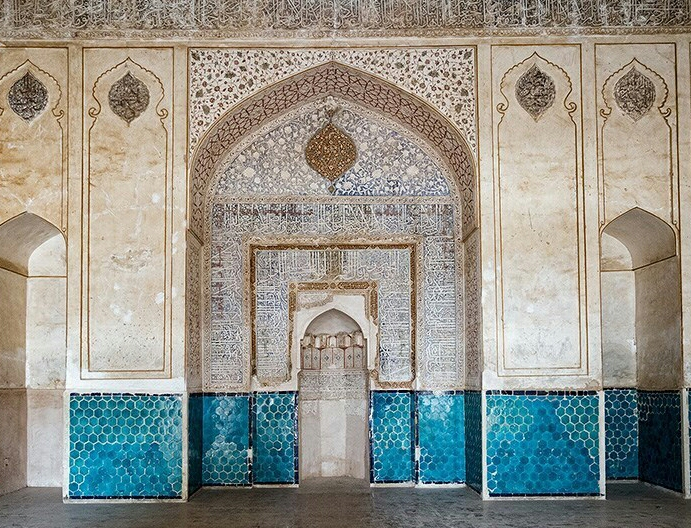

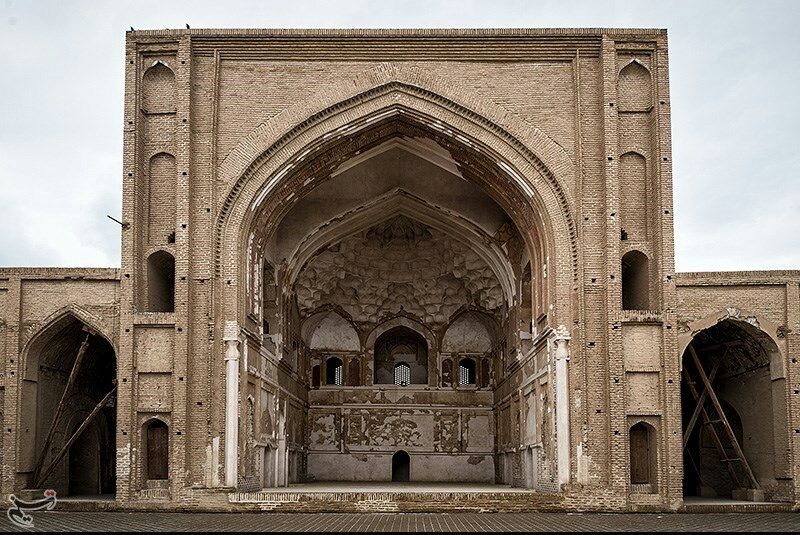

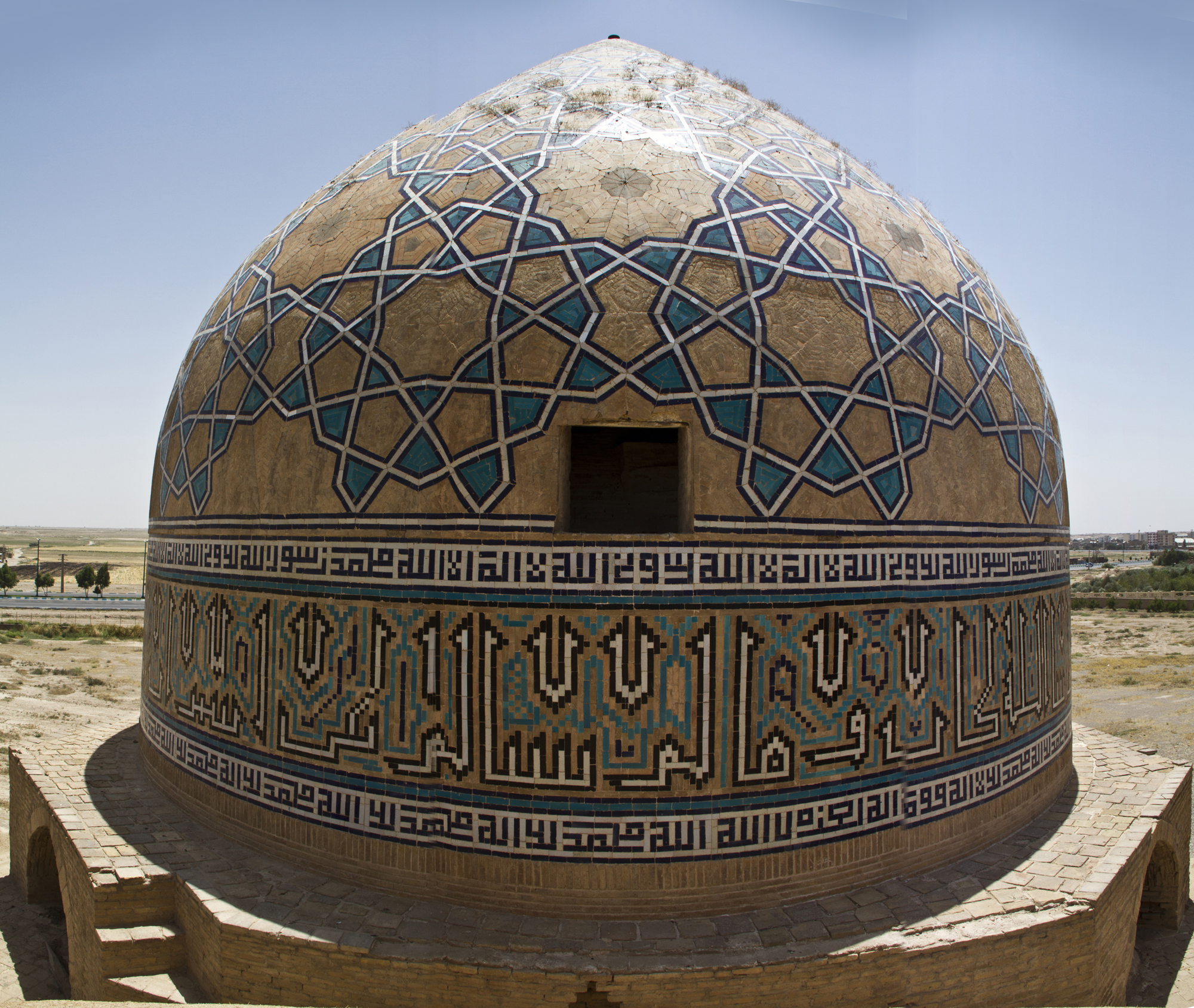

== See also ==
- Shia Islam in Iran
- List of mosques in Iran

== Sources ==
- Anisi, Alireza (2025). "The Friday Mosque of Sava: Exemplifying Continuity and Integrity in Iranian Mosque Architecture". Iranian Studies. 58 (3): 384–417. doi:10.1017/irn.2025.24.
- Korn, Lorenz (2000). "SALJUQS vi. ART AND ARCHITECTURE". In Yarshater, Ehsan (ed.). Encyclopædia Iranica (Online ed.). Encyclopædia Iranica Foundation.
- Schnyder, R. (1973). "Political Centres and Artistic Powers in Saljuq". In Richards, D.S. (ed.). Papers on Islamic History. Vol. III. Cassirer. pp. 201–210.
