= Safiabad, Rafsanjan =

Safiabad صفی‌آباد
- Village
- Location within Iran
- Coordinates: 30°26′30″N 55°50′45″E
- Country: Iran
- Province: Kerman
- County: Rafsanjan
- Bakhsh: Central
- Rural District: Eslamiyeh

Population (2006)
  - Total: 191
- Time zone: UTC+3:30 (IRST)
  - Summer (DST): UTC+4:30 (IRDT)

Safiabad (Persian: صفی‌آباد, also Romanized as Şafīābād; also known as Safīel and Seyf) is a village in Eslamiyeh Rural District, in the Central District of Rafsanjan County, Kerman Province, Iran. At the 2006 census, its population was 191, in 49 families.
