= Deh-e Aqa, Shazand =

Deh-e Aqa ده اقا
- Village
- Location within Iran
- Coordinates: 33°44′14″N 49°19′03″E
- Country: Iran
- Province: Markazi
- County: Shazand
- Bakhsh: Sarband
- Rural District: Hendudar

Population (2006)
  - Total: 112
- Time zone: UTC+3:30 (IRST)
  - Summer (DST): UTC+4:30 (IRDT)

Deh-e Aqa (Persian: ده اقا, also Romanized as Deh-e Āqā and Deh Āqā; also known as Deh Āgha) is a village in Hendudar Rural District, Sarband District, Shazand County, Markazi Province, Iran. At the 2006 census, its population was 112, in 19 families.
