= Safiabad, Shahr-e Babak =

Safiabad صفي اباد
- Village
- Location within Iran
- Coordinates: 30°32′46″N 54°42′11″E
- Country: Iran
- Province: Kerman
- County: Shahr-e Babak
- Bakhsh: Dehaj
- Rural District: Khabar

Population (2006)
  - Total: 264
- Time zone: UTC+3:30 (IRST)
  - Summer (DST): UTC+4:30 (IRDT)

Safiabad (Persian: صفي اباد, also Romanized as Şafīābād) is a village in Khabar Rural District, Dehaj District, Shahr-e Babak County, Kerman Province, Iran. At the 2006 census, its population was 264, in 50 families.
