= Saveh =

City in Markazi province, Iran

Saveh Persian: ساوه
- City
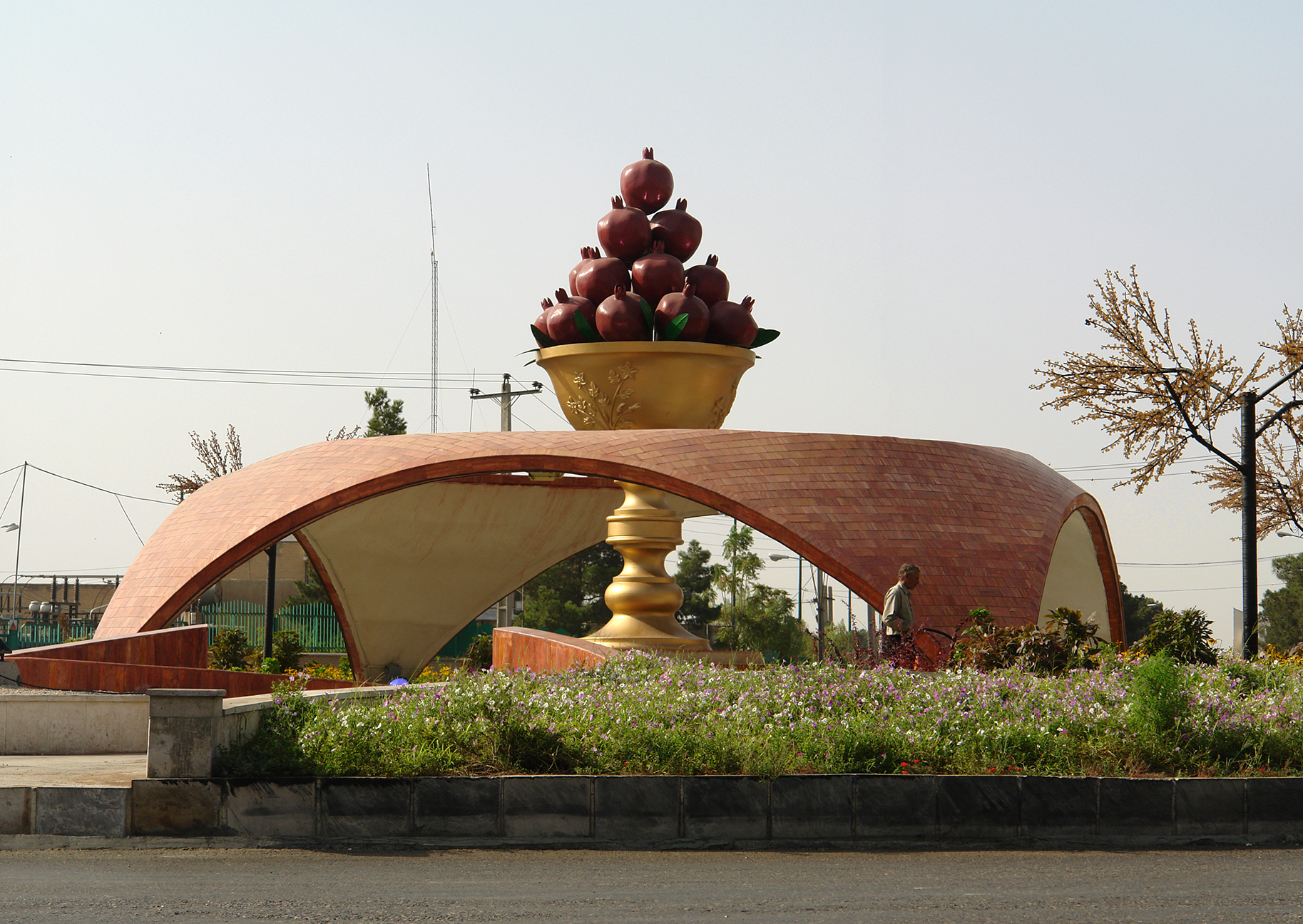
- Shahrdari Square in Saveh

- Location within Iran
- Coordinates: 35°01′40″N 50°21′40″E
- Country: Iran
- Province: Markazi
- County: Saveh
- District: Central
- Elevation: 1,008 m (3,307 ft)

Population (2016)
  - Total: 220,762
- Time zone: UTC+3:30 (IRST)
- Website: www.savehcity.ir www.saveh125.ir

Saveh (Persian: ساوه) (Note: Also romanized as Sāveh; also known as Sāwa) is a city in the Central District of Saveh County, Markazi province, Iran, serving as capital of both the county and the district. It is about 120 km (70 mi) southwest of Tehran.

== History ==
In the 7th century BC, it was a stronghold of the Medes. During the Parthian era, it was called Saavakineh, and was one of the main hubs of the empire.

In the 11th century, it was a residence of the Daylamites and of the Seljuks. In 1118, a battle occurred in Saveh between Mahmud II and his uncle Sanjar. It was severely damaged by the Mongol invasion in the 13th century; it was restored during the Ilkhanate. Saveh was again sacked by the Timurids but later grew during the Safavids era. In the summer of 1725, the city was besieged and captured by the Afghans after a battle with Tahmasp Mirza. It eventually lost much of its importance when Tehran became the official capital of Iran and, in the mid-19th century, many of the inhabitants moved to Tehran.

== Demographics ==
=== Population ===
At the time of the 2006 National Census, the city's population was 179,009 in 48,221 households. The following census in 2011 counted 200,481 people in 58,255 households. The 2016 census measured the population of the city as 220,762 people in 67,230 households.

== Climate ==
Saveh has a hot semi-arid climate, (BSh) in Köppen climate classification and (BS) in Trewartha climate classification. Its summers are very hot and dry, while its winters are cool to cold and somewhat rainy.

Climate data for Saveh, altitude: 1108.0 m, from 1992–2005.
Month	Jan	Feb	Mar	Apr	May	Jun	Jul	Aug	Sep	Oct	Nov	Dec	Year
Record high °C (°F)	19.6 (67.3)	23.6 (74.5)	29.0 (84.2)	33.6 (92.5)	39.8 (103.6)	42.0 (107.6)	43.8 (110.8)	43.0 (109.4)	39.6 (103.3)	34.6 (94.3)	28.0 (82.4)	23.6 (74.5)	43.8 (110.8)
Mean daily maximum °C (°F)	9.6 (49.3)	12.5 (54.5)	17.1 (62.8)	23.7 (74.7)	29.3 (84.7)	35.2 (95.4)	37.7 (99.9)	37.2 (99.0)	33.0 (91.4)	26.1 (79.0)	17.1 (62.8)	11.0 (51.8)	24.1 (75.4)
Daily mean °C (°F)	4.8 (40.6)	7.0 (44.6)	11.4 (52.5)	17.7 (63.9)	22.9 (73.2)	28.5 (83.3)	31.4 (88.5)	30.8 (87.4)	26.2 (79.2)	19.8 (67.6)	11.7 (53.1)	6.5 (43.7)	18.2 (64.8)
Mean daily minimum °C (°F)	0.1 (32.2)	1.5 (34.7)	5.8 (42.4)	11.7 (53.1)	16.4 (61.5)	21.8 (71.2)	25.1 (77.2)	24.4 (75.9)	19.4 (66.9)	13.4 (56.1)	6.4 (43.5)	2.0 (35.6)	12.3 (54.2)
Record low °C (°F)	−11.0 (12.2)	−14.4 (6.1)	−4.6 (23.7)	0.8 (33.4)	6.8 (44.2)	13.0 (55.4)	17.6 (63.7)	16.6 (61.9)	11.2 (52.2)	5.6 (42.1)	−7.2 (19.0)	−6.5 (20.3)	−14.4 (6.1)
Average precipitation mm (inches)	36.2 (1.43)	23.1 (0.91)	34.1 (1.34)	28.0 (1.10)	14.5 (0.57)	1.4 (0.06)	1.3 (0.05)	0.2 (0.01)	0.4 (0.02)	6.0 (0.24)	28.0 (1.10)	33.1 (1.30)	206.3 (8.13)
Average precipitation days	7.5	5.8	7.3	7.5	6.2	1.2	0.9	0.3	0.5	2.3	5.9	6.9	52.3

== Economy ==
Saveh produces large amounts of wheat and cotton. It is also well known for its pomegranates and melons. Kaveh Industrial City, the largest industrial city in Iran, is located in Saveh.

== Main sights ==
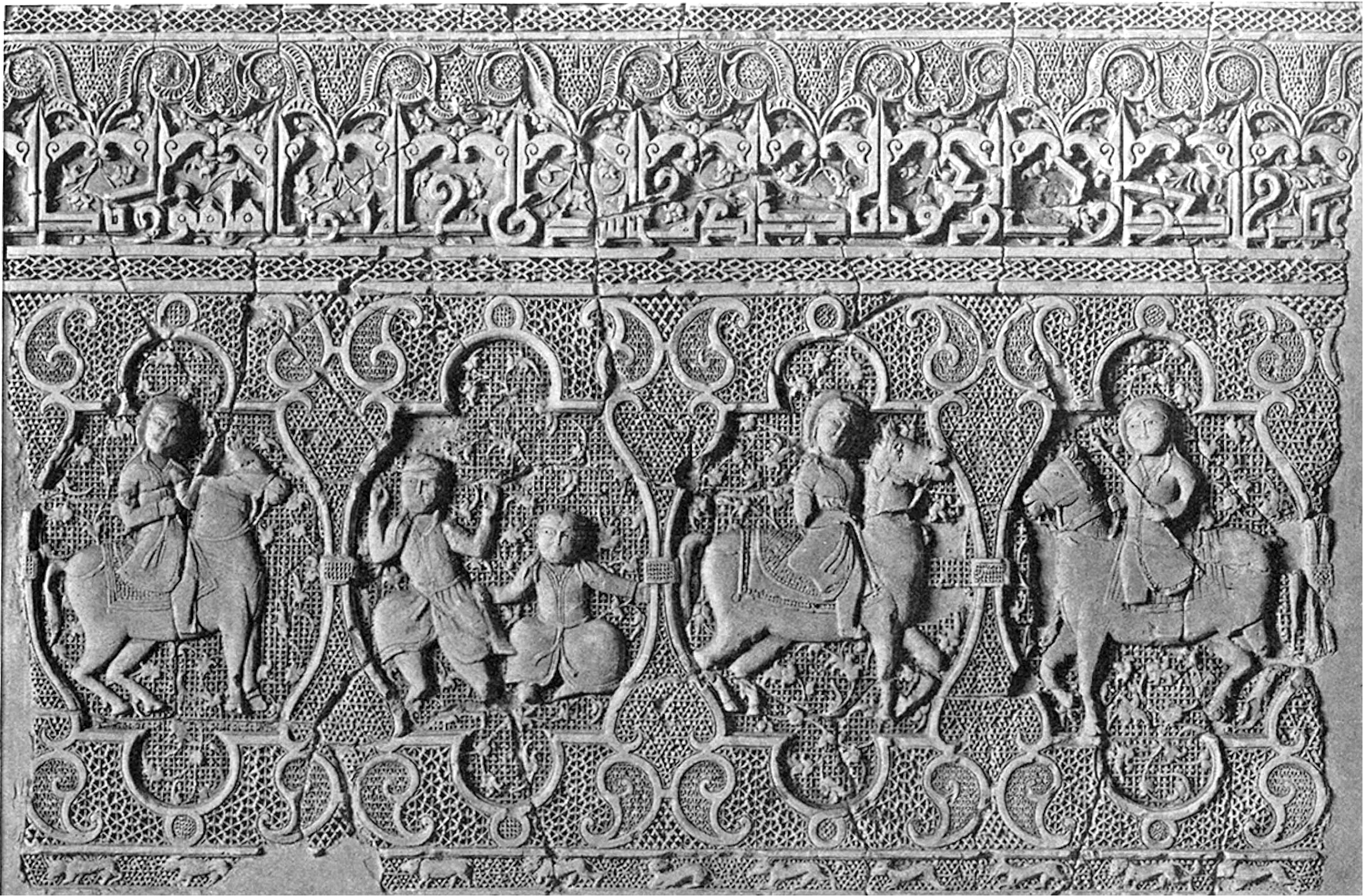
Monumental Seljuk stucco panel (116 x 178cm), Saveh, Iran, 12th century.

- Jameh Mosque of Saveh, built by the Seljuks in the 11th century includes a courtyard, porch, a 14 m tall minaret, nocturnal areas, a tiled dome (14 m tall, with a diameter of 16 m) and two altars with inscription in the Kufic script.
- Red Mosque of Saveh, also known as Enqelab Mosque. Dating to the Seljuk era, it has a brickwork dome, an 11th-century minaret, three porticoes, and internally houses an altar with plasterwork and inscriptions.
- Imamzadeh Soltan Seyed Eshaq Mausoleum
- Sorkhdeh Bridge, south of the city
- Khamseh-Abad caravansarai

Outside the city are the fortresses of Esmaeilieh (35 km), Alvir and Ardemin (56 km, on the road to Hamadan), as well as the archaeological sites of Aveh and Alishar.

== Legends ==
According to Iranian tradition, the Magi who visited the infant Jesus traveled from Saveh, and are buried among its ruins. Marco Polo described the tombs of the Magi in his travel book, Il Milione:

In Persia is the city of Saba, from which the Three Magi set out... and in this city they are buried, in three very large and beautiful monuments, side by side. And above them there is a square building, beautifully kept. The bodies are still entire, with hair and beard remaining. (Book i).

Saveh is said to have possessed one of the greatest libraries in West Asia, until its destruction by the Mongols during their first invasion of Iran.

Another legend about Saveh is the Lake of Saveh. It is a lake which is said to have been located near the city. According to the legend mentioned in historical Persian texts, this lake dried out on the night of the birth of Muhammad. A recent investigation in the Zarand area between Tehran and Saveh has revealed some evidence of the existence of this lake in Zarand Plain.

== Politics ==
In 2004, Saveh became the second city in the history of the Islamic Republic to appoint a woman as mayor.

== Notable people ==
- Yusuf Adil Shah (former Mamluk and founder of the Sultanate of Bijapur)

== Gallery ==
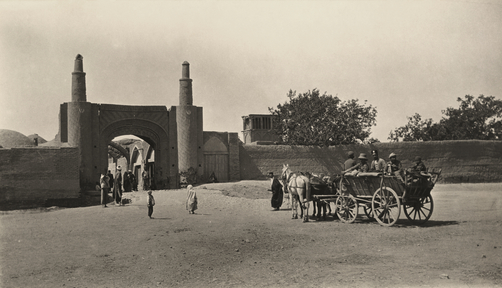
Saveh Gate, 1920s

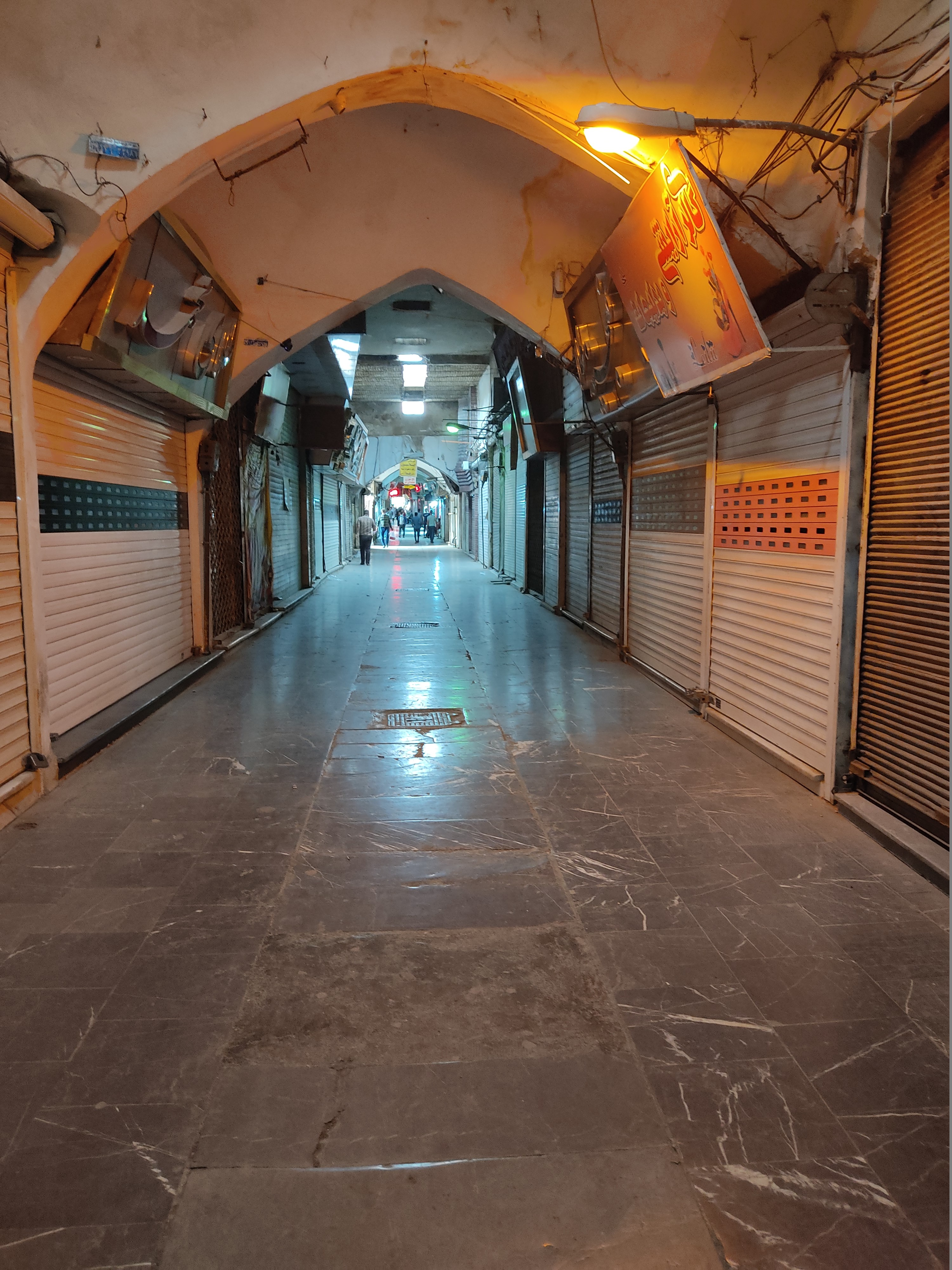
Saveh Bazaar

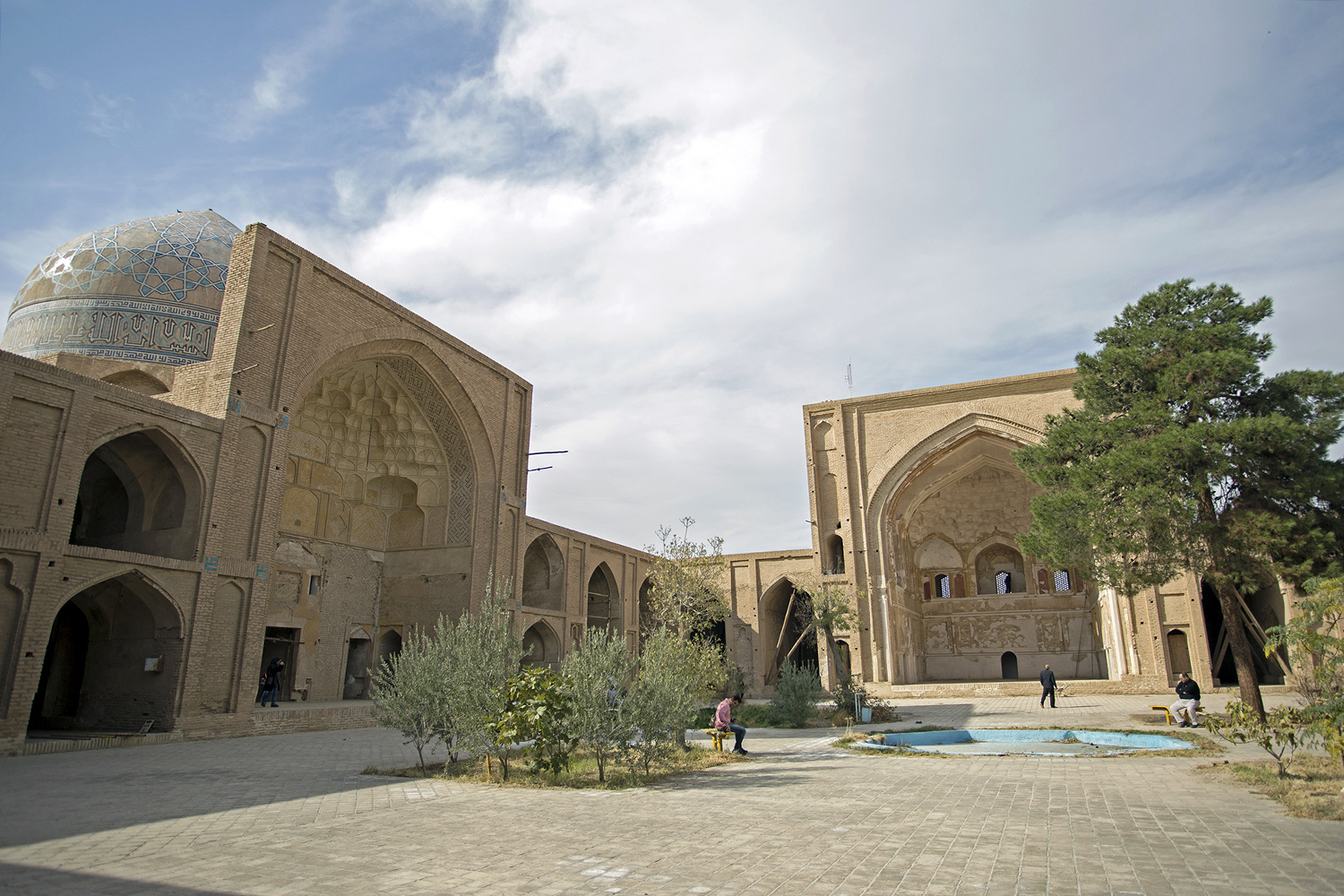
Jameh Mosque of Saveh

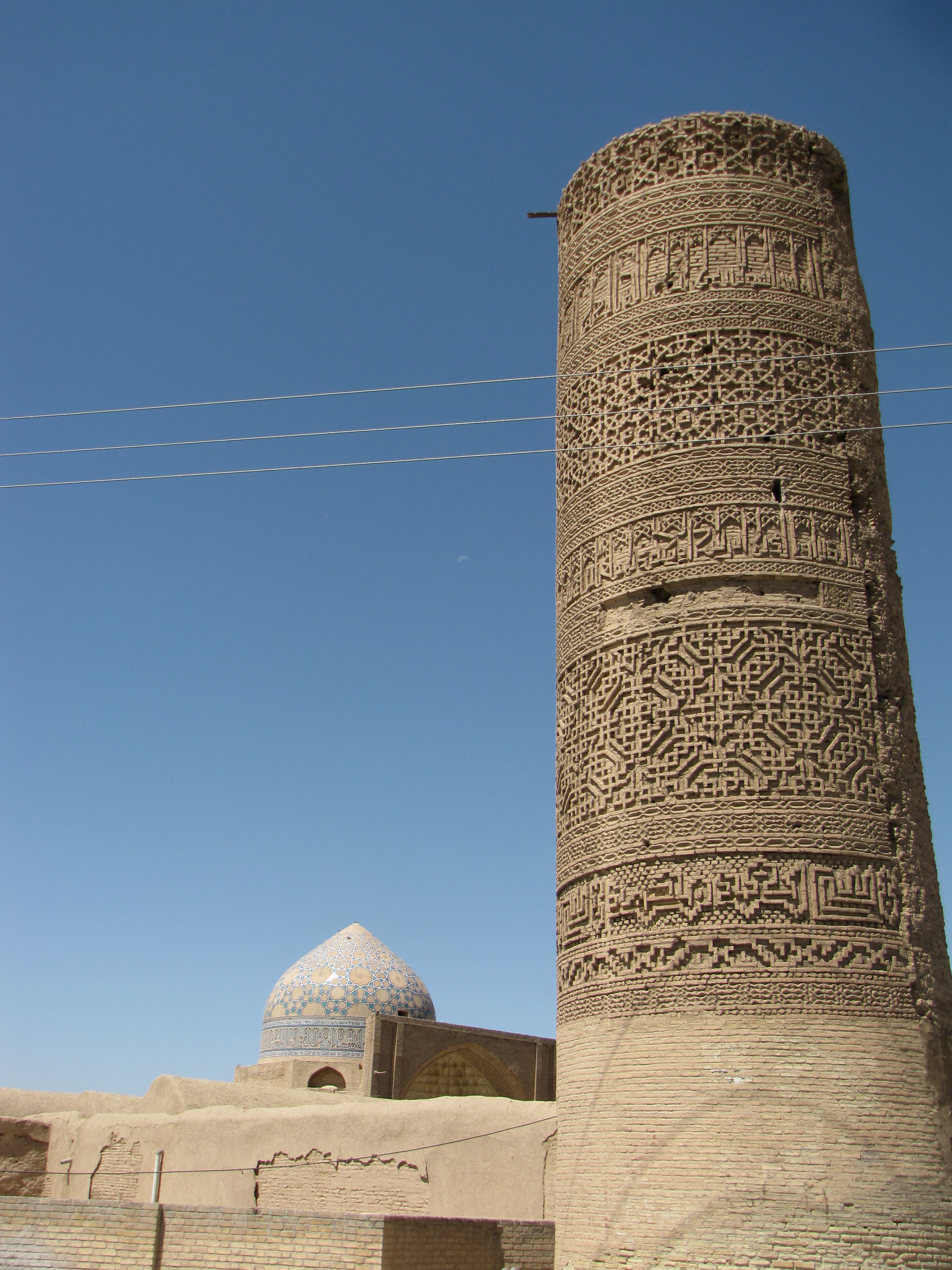
Minaret of Jameh Mosque of Saveh

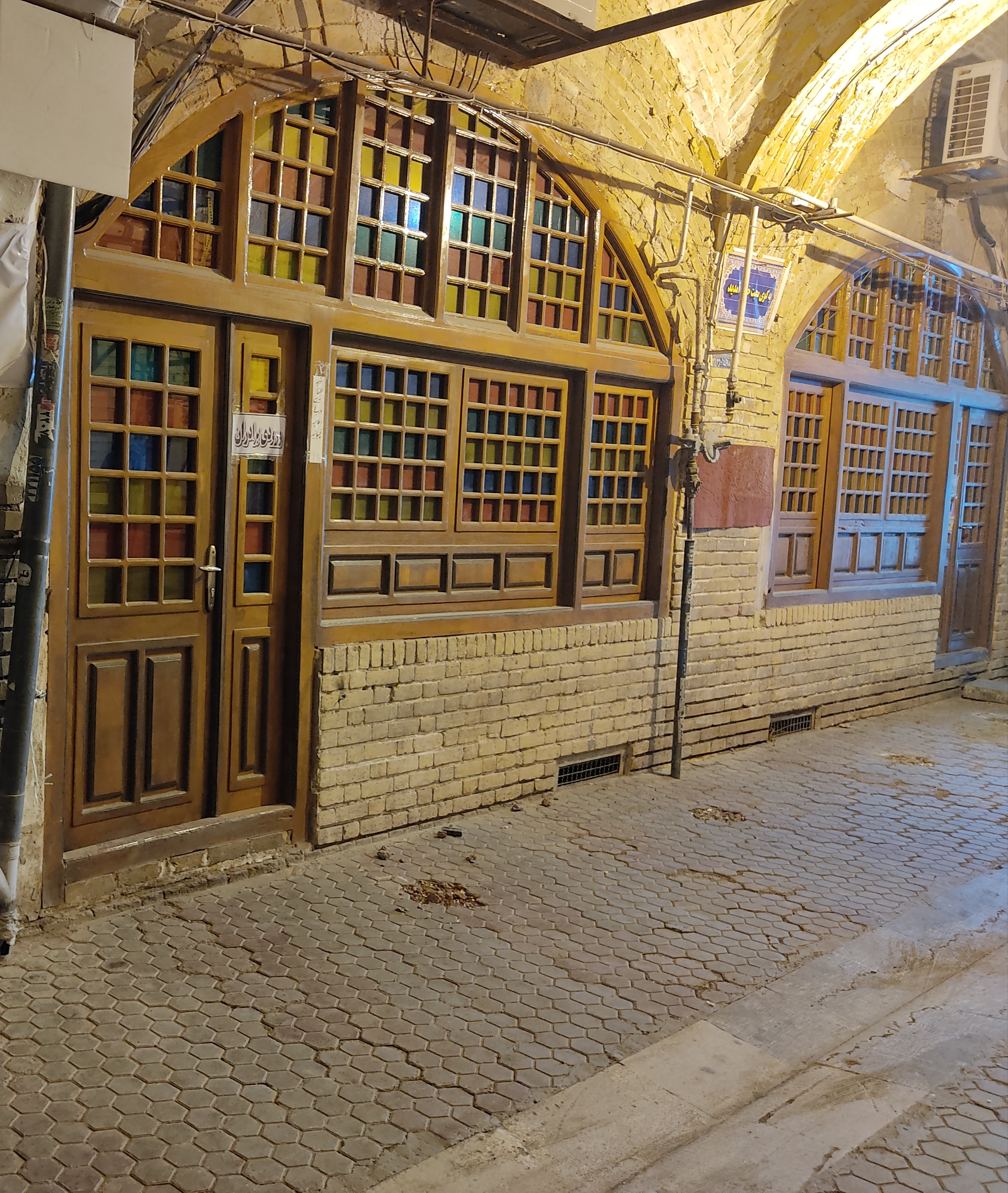
Saveh Bazaar Mosque

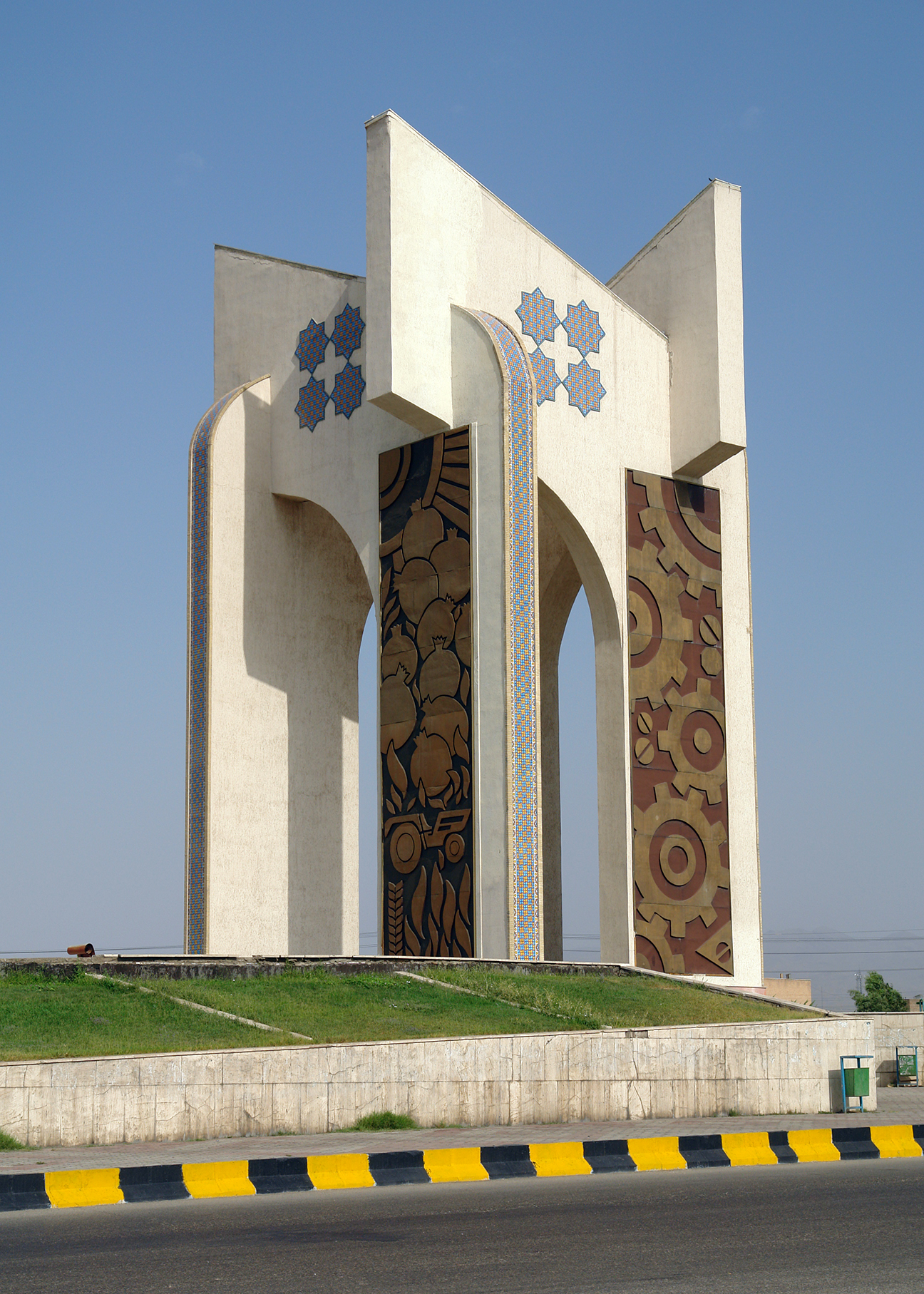
Sardaran square

Media related to Saveh at Wikimedia Commons
