= Shafiabad, Nishapur =

Shafiabad شفيع اباد
- Village
- Location within Iran
- Coordinates: 36°07′31″N 58°43′09″E
- Country: Iran
- Province: Razavi Khorasan
- County: Nishapur
- Bakhsh: Central
- Rural District: Rivand

Population (2006)
  - Total: 23
- Time zone: UTC+3:30 (IRST)
  - Summer (DST): UTC+4:30 (IRDT)

Shafiabad (Persian: شفيع اباد, also Romanized as Shafī‘ābād; also known as Shā‘fīabād Bātān) is a village in Rivand Rural District, in the Central District of Nishapur County, Razavi Khorasan Province, Iran. At the 2006 census, its population was 23, in 8 families.
