= Nur Ali Beyk Rural District =

Rural district in Markazi province, Iran

Nur Ali Beyk Rural District Persian: دهستان نورعلي بيك
- Rural District
- Location within Iran
- Coordinates: 35°02′N 50°10′E
- Country: Iran
- Province: Markazi
- County: Saveh
- District: Central
- Established: 1987
- Capital: Yalabad

Population (2016)
  - Total: 14,530
- Time zone: UTC+3:30 (IRST)

Nur Ali Beyk Rural District (Persian: دهستان نورعلي بيك) is in the Central District of Saveh County, Markazi province, Iran. Its capital is the village of Yalabad. The previous capital of the rural district was the village of Qardin.

== Demographics ==
=== Population ===
At the time of the 2006 National Census, the rural district's population was 13,417 in 3,427 households. There were 13,222 inhabitants in 3,744 households at the following census of 2011. The 2016 census measured the population of the rural district as 14,530 in 4,600 households. The most populous of its 56 villages was Yalabad, with 3,761 people.

=== Other villages in the rural district ===
- Asiabak-e Band
- Band-e Chay
- Lalain
- Mahmudabad
- Nur Ali Beyk
- Olusjerd
- Seqanliq
- Sharaflu
