= Qareh Chay Rural District =

Rural district in Markazi province, Iran

Qareh Chay Rural District Persian: دهستان قره چائ
- Rural District
- Location within Iran
- Coordinates: 34°53′N 50°26′E
- Country: Iran
- Province: Markazi
- County: Saveh
- District: Central
- Established: 1987
- Capital: Harisan

Population (2016)
  - Total: 6,056
- Time zone: UTC+3:30 (IRST)

Qareh Chay Rural District (Persian: دهستان قره چائ) is in the Central District of Saveh County, Markazi province, Iran. Its capital is the village of Harisan.

== Demographics ==
=== Population ===
At the time of the 2006 National Census, the rural district's population was 9,956 in 2,277 households. There were 9,665 inhabitants in 2,539 households at the following census of 2011. The 2016 census measured the population of the rural district as 6,056 in 1,716 households. The most populous of its 36 villages was Qareh Chay, with 745 people.

=== Other villages in the rural district ===
- Abbasabad
- Andis
- Emamabad
- Owjan
- Qaleh-ye Shir Khan
- Seyfabad
