= Shahsavan Kandi Rural District =

Rural district in Markazi province, Iran

Shahsavan Kandi Rural District Persian: دهستان شاهسون كندئ
- Rural District
- Location within Iran
- Coordinates: 35°05′N 50°04′E
- Country: Iran
- Province: Markazi
- County: Saveh
- District: Central
- Established: 1987
- Capital: Qeytaniyeh

Population (2016)
  - Total: 1,781
- Time zone: UTC+3:30 (IRST)

Shahsavan Kandi Rural District (Persian: دهستان شاهسون كندئ) is in the Central District of Saveh County, Markazi province, Iran. Its capital is the village of Qeytaniyeh.

== Demographics ==
=== Population ===
At the time of the 2006 National Census, the rural district's population was 1,537 in 556 households. There were 1,007 inhabitants in 399 households at the following census of 2011. The 2016 census measured the population of the rural district as 1,781 in 668 households. The most populous of its 46 villages was Nivesht, with 349 people.

=== Other villages in the rural district ===
- Haqaniyeh
- Noshveh
- Palangabad
- Razin
- Safiabad
- Susan Naqin
