= Taraznahid Rural District =

Rural district in Markazi province, Iran

Taraznahid Rural District Persian: دهستان طرازناهيد
- Rural District
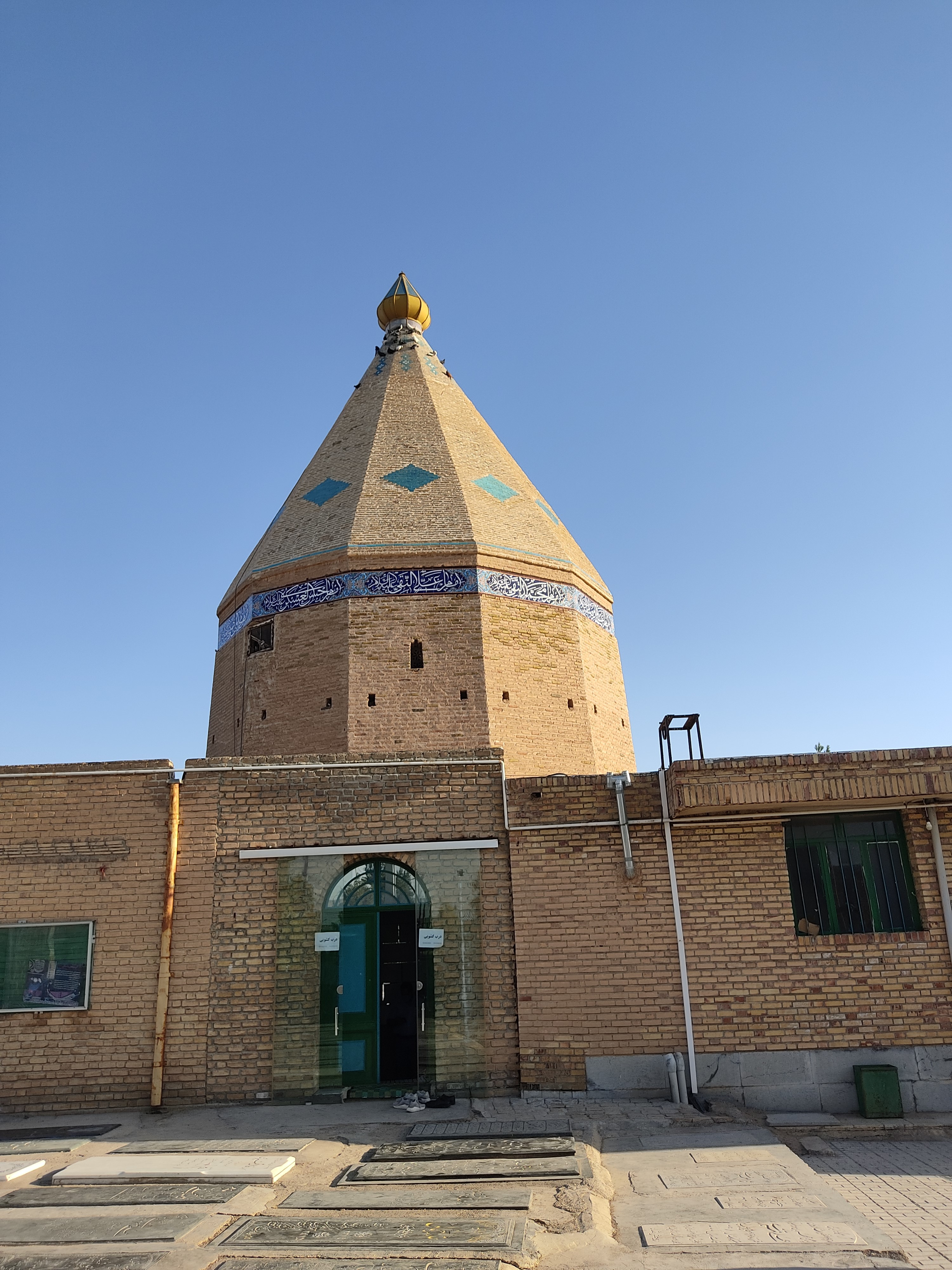
- Emamzadeh Seyyed Harun

- Location within Iran
- Coordinates: 35°01′N 50°34′E
- Country: Iran
- Province: Markazi
- County: Saveh
- District: Central
- Established: 1987
- Capital: Taraznahid

Population (2016)
  - Total: 12,319
- Time zone: UTC+3:30 (IRST)

Taraznahid Rural District (Persian: دهستان طرازناهيد) is in the Central District of Saveh County, Markazi province, Iran. Its capital is the village of Taraznahid.

== Demographics ==
=== Population ===
At the time of the 2006 National Census, the rural district's population was 11,444 in 2,721 households. There were 13,666 inhabitants in 3,276 households at the following census of 2011. The 2016 census measured the population of the rural district as 12,319 in 3,320 households. The most populous of its 39 localities was the Afghan Refugee Camp, with 3,639 people.

=== Other villages in the rural district ===
- Ahmadabad
- Bagh-e Sheykh
- Bolagh
- Jafarabad
- Kaveh Industrial City
- Rezaabad
