= Central District (Saveh County) =

District in Markazi province, Iran

Central District (Saveh County) Persian: بخش مرکزی شهرستان ساوه
- District
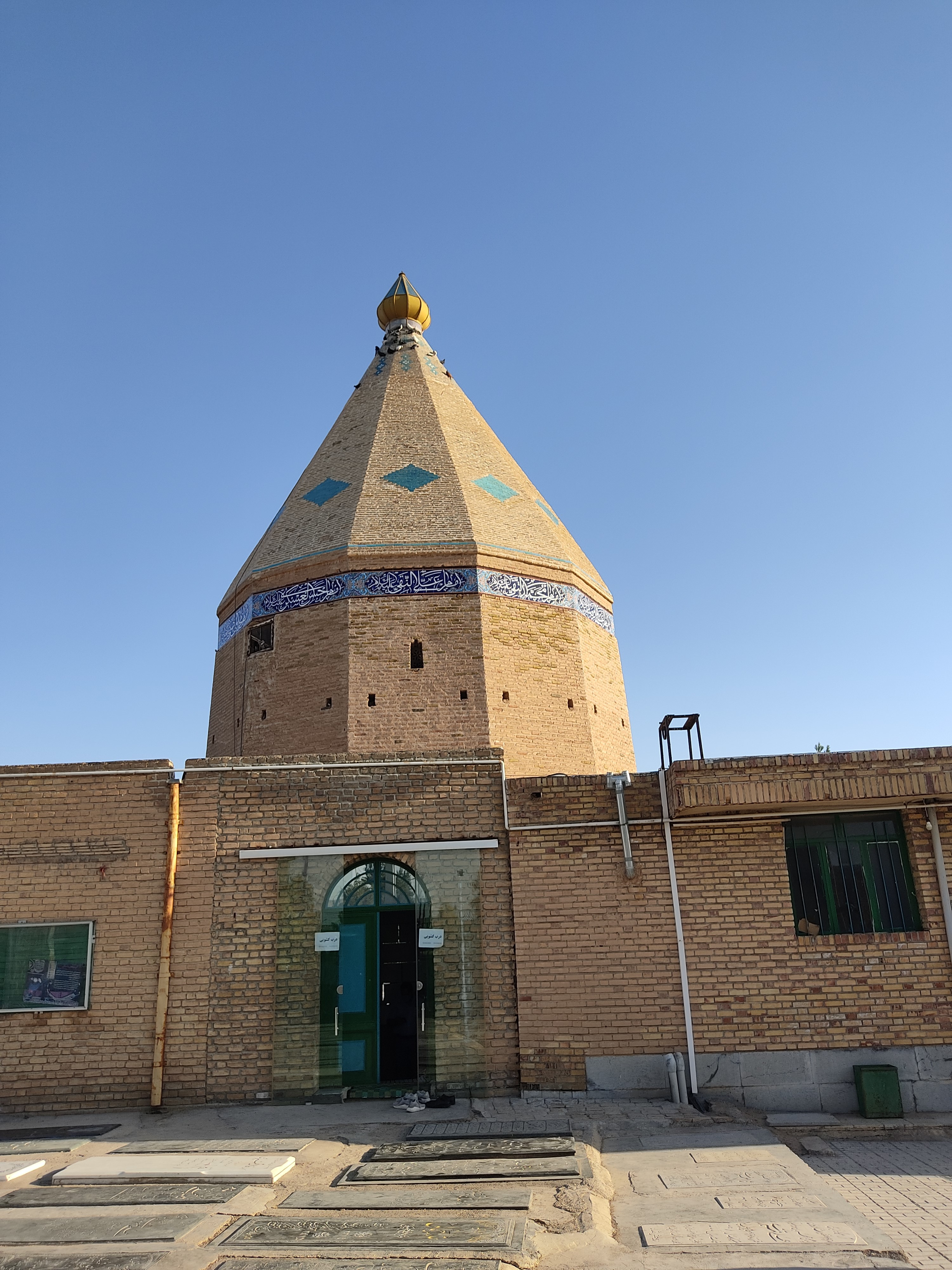
- Emamzadeh Seyyed Harun in Taraznahid Rural District

- Location within Iran
- Coordinates: 35°00′N 50°19′E
- Country: Iran
- Province: Markazi
- County: Saveh
- Capital: Saveh

Population (2016)
  - Total: 259,354
- Time zone: UTC+3:30 (IRST)

The Central District of Saveh County (Persian: بخش مرکزی شهرستان ساوه) is in Markazi province, Iran. Its capital is the city of Saveh.

== History ==
The village of Aveh was converted to a city in 2013.

== Demographics ==
=== Population ===
At the time of the 2006 National Census, the district's population was 215,413 in 57,202 households. The following census in 2011 counted 238,041 people in 68,213 households. The 2016 census measured the population of the district as 259,354 inhabitants in 78,635 households.

=== Administrative divisions ===
Central District (Saveh County) Population
Administrative Divisions	2006	2011	2016
Nur Ali Beyk RD	13,417	13,222	14,530
Qareh Chay RD	9,956	9,665	6,056
Shahsavan Kandi RD	1,537	1,007	1,781
Taraznahid RD	11,494	13,666	12,319
Aveh (city)			3,906
Saveh (city)	179,009	200,481	220,762
Total	215,413	238,041	259,354
RD = Rural District
