= Saveh County =

County in Markazi Province, Iran

Saveh County Persian: شهرستان ساوه
- County
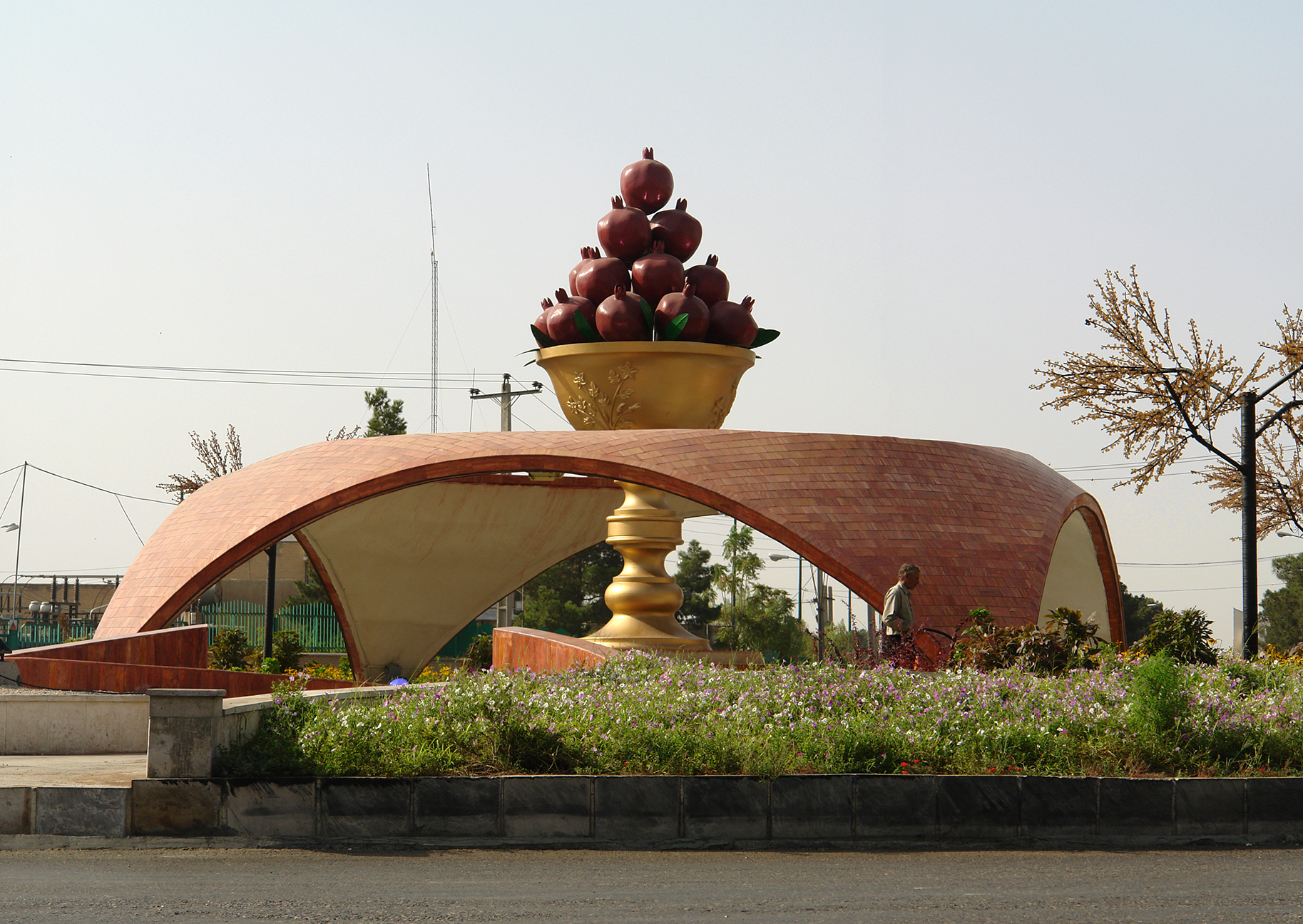
- Shahrdari Square in the county's capital, Saveh

- Location of Saveh County in Markazi province (top, yellow)

- Location of Markazi province in Iran
- Coordinates: 35°07′N 50°03′E
- Country: Iran
- Province: Markazi
- Capital: Saveh
- Districts: Central, Nowbaran

Population (2016)
  - Total: 283,538
- Time zone: UTC+3:30 (IRST)

Saveh County (Persian: شهرستان ساوه) (Note: Also romanized as Ŝahrestāne Sāweh) is in Markazi province, Iran. Its capital is the city of Saveh.

== History ==
The village of Aveh was converted to a city in 2013.

== Demographics ==
=== Population ===
At the 2006 National Census, the county's population was 235,843 in 63,672 households. The following census in 2011 counted 259,030 people in 75,650 households. The 2016 census measured the population of the county as 283,538 in 87,444 households.

=== Administrative divisions ===
Saveh County's population history and administrative structure over three consecutive censuses are shown in the following table.

Saveh County Population
| Administrative Divisions | 2006 | 2011 | 2016 |
|---|---|---|---|
| Central District | 215,413 | 238,041 | 259,354 |
| Nur Ali Beyk RD | 13,417 | 13,222 | 14,530 |
| Qareh Chay RD | 9,956 | 9,665 | 6,056 |
| Shahsavan Kandi RD | 1,537 | 1,007 | 1,781 |
| Taraznahid RD | 11,494 | 13,666 | 12,319 |
| Aveh (city) | | | 3,906 |
| Saveh (city) | 179,009 | 200,481 | 220,762 |
| Nowbaran District | 20,430 | 20,989 | 24,182 |
| Aq Kahriz RD | 4,712 | 3,578 | 4,076 |
| Bayat RD | 5,502 | 5,337 | 6,006 |
| Kuhpayeh RD | 3,891 | 4,912 | 5,391 |
| Gharqabad (city) | 4,394 | 4,992 | 5,375 |
| Nowbaran (city) | 1,931 | 2,170 | 3,334 |
| Total | 235,843 | 259,030 | 283,538 |
RD = Rural District

== Gallery ==
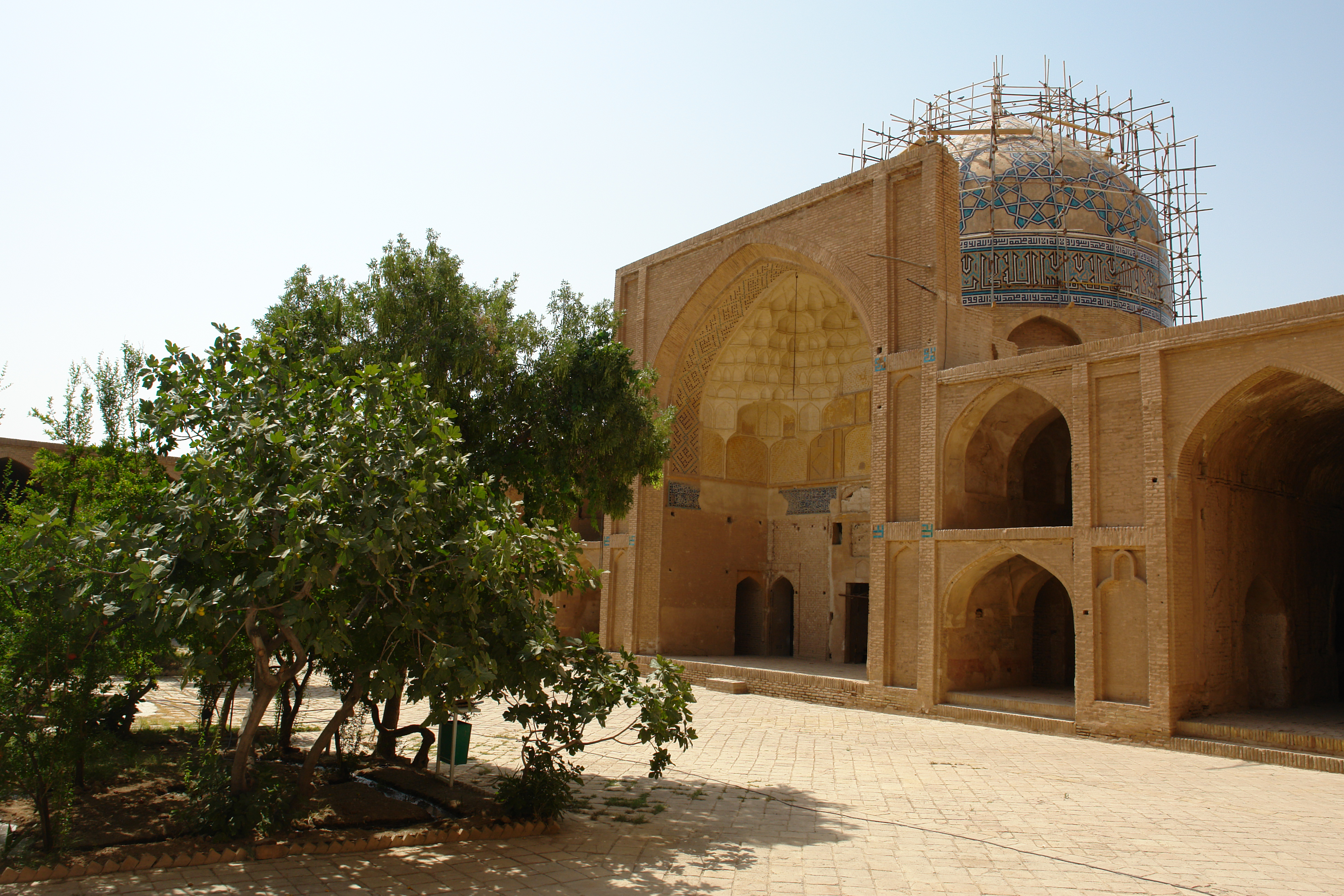
Jameh Mosque of Saveh

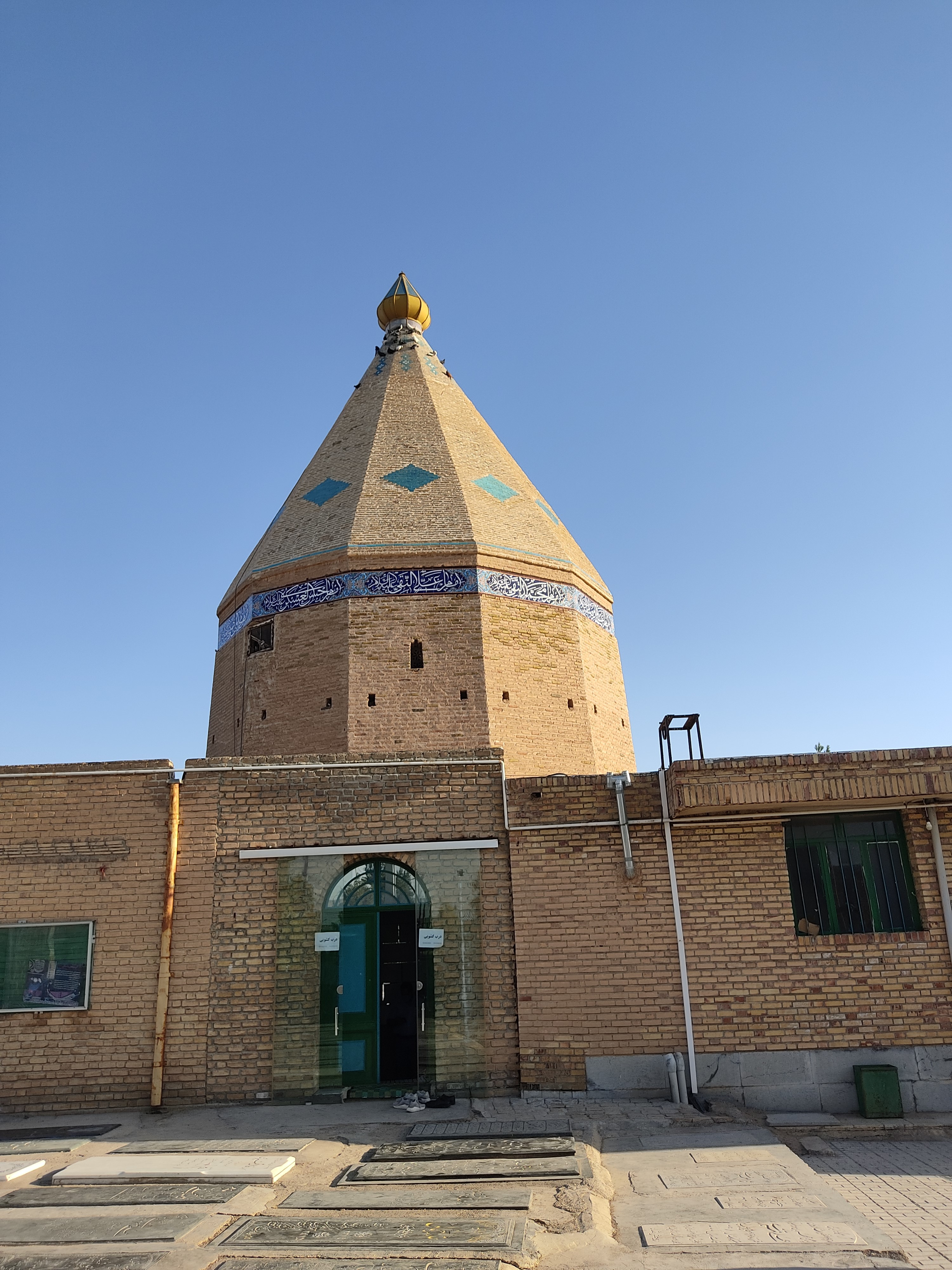
Imamzadeh Seyed Haroun

== See also ==
Media related to Saveh County at Wikimedia Commons
