= Yazd =

City in Yazd province, Iran

Yazd یزد Kath, Isatis
- City
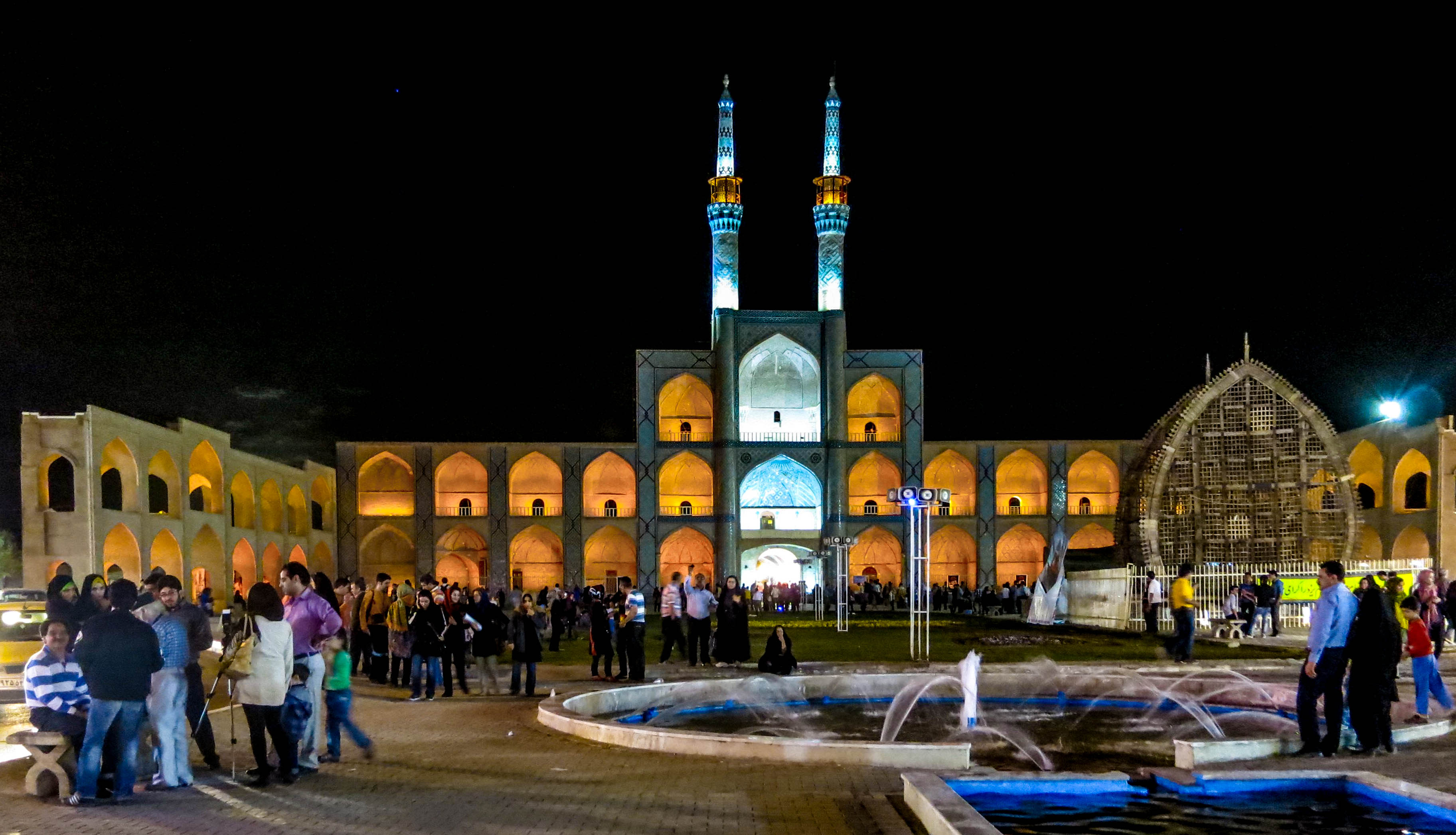
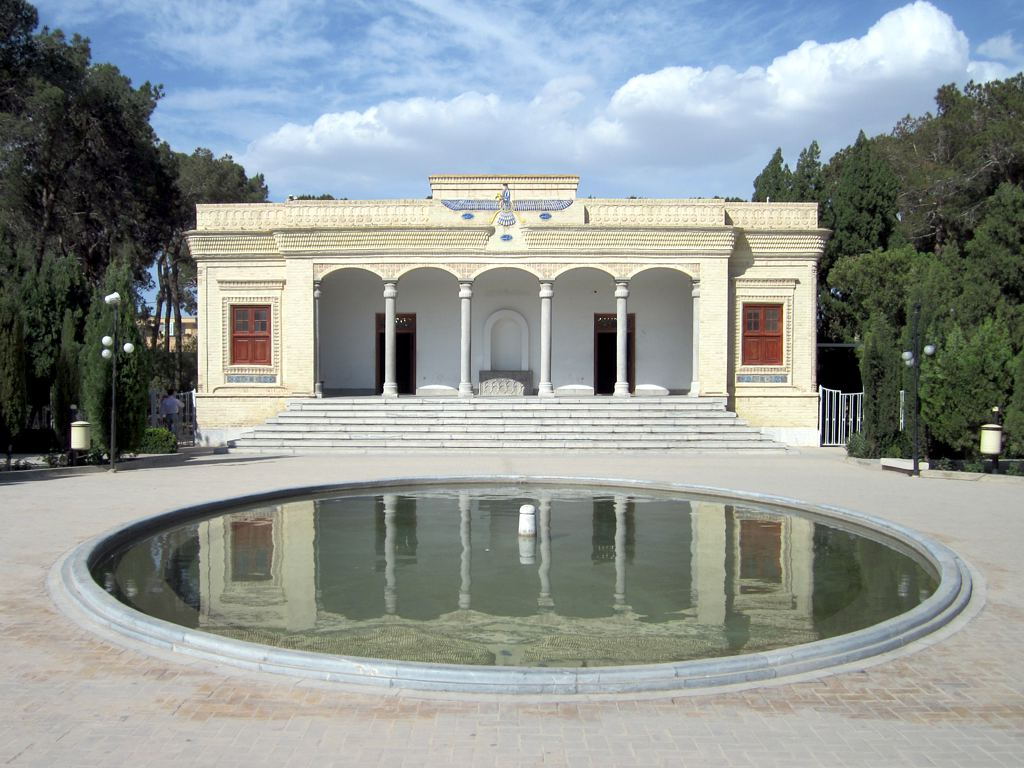
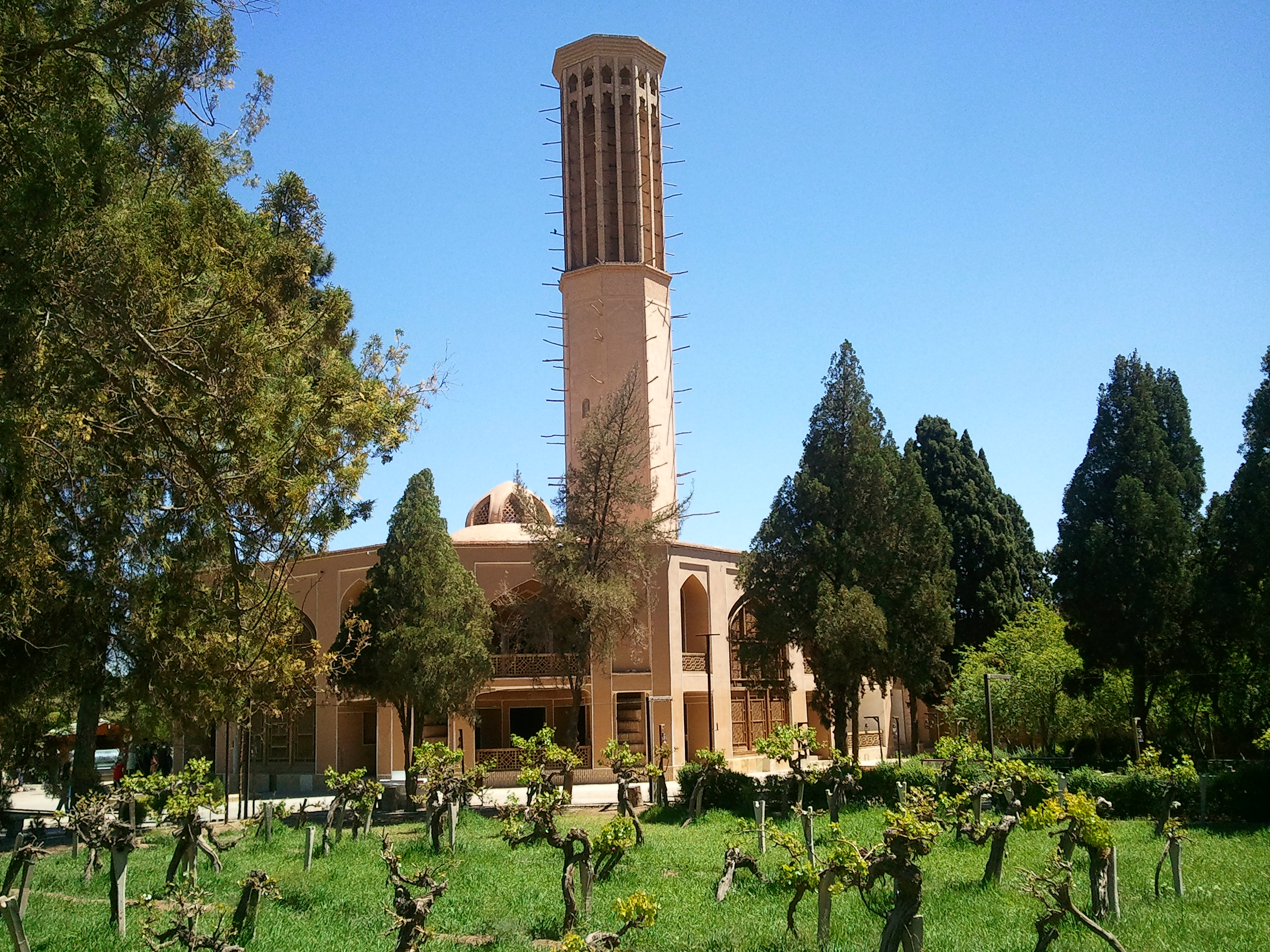
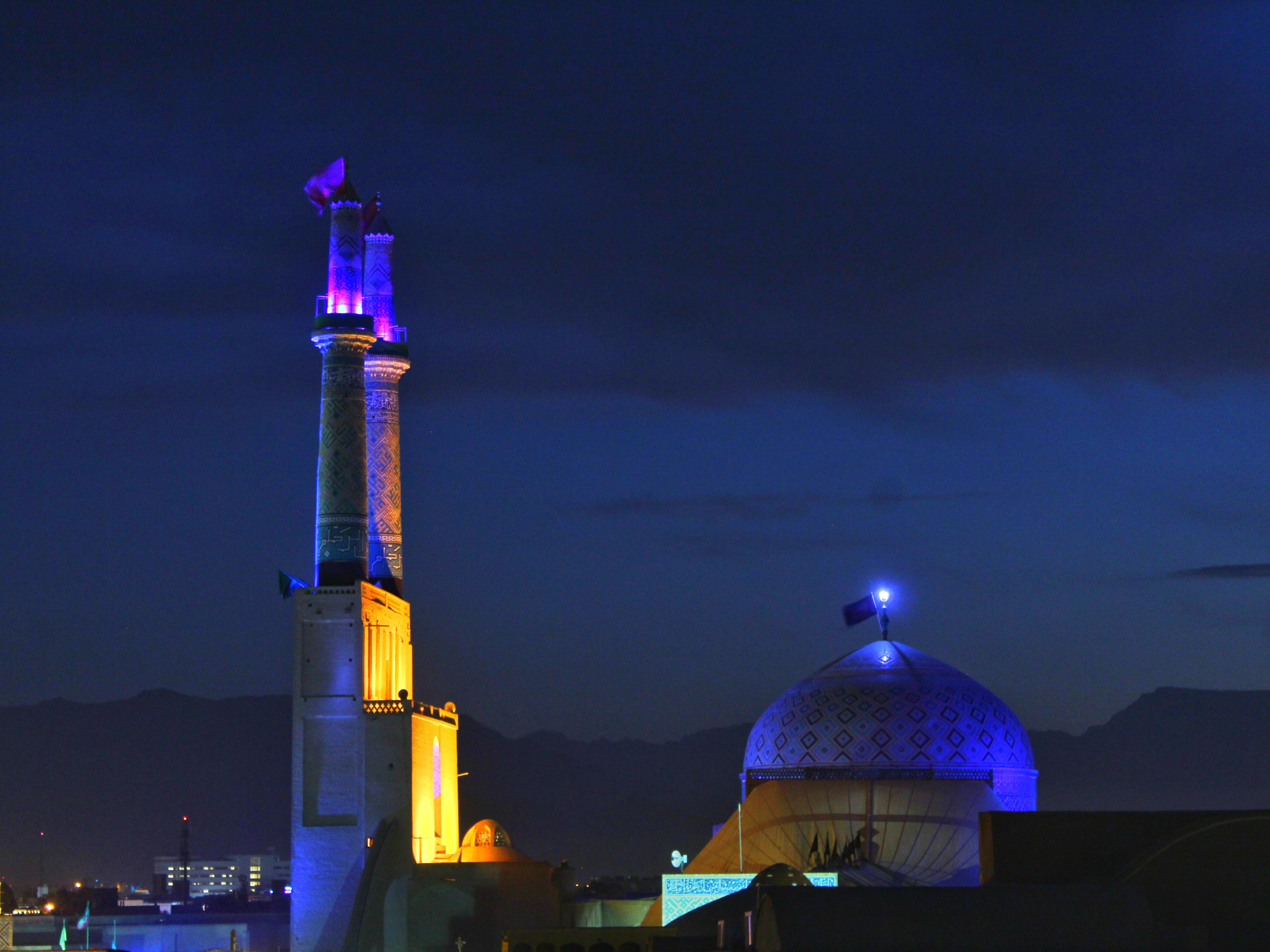
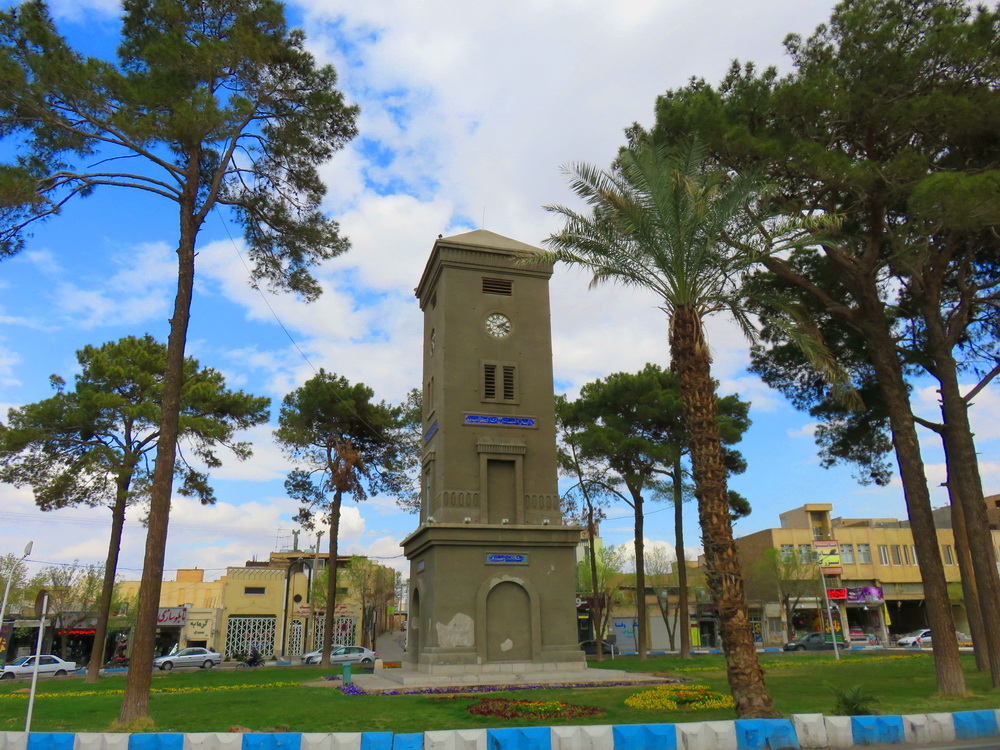
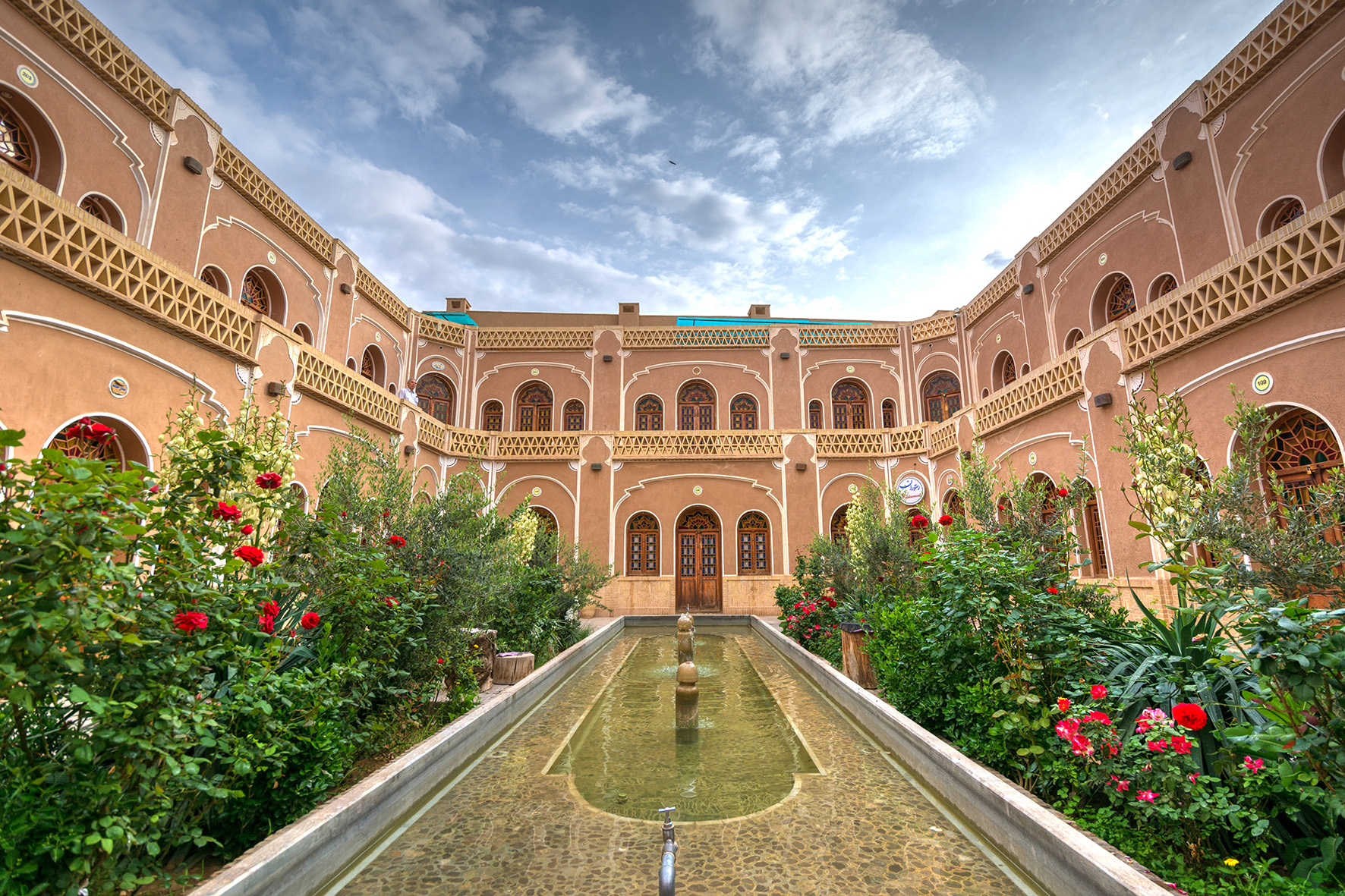
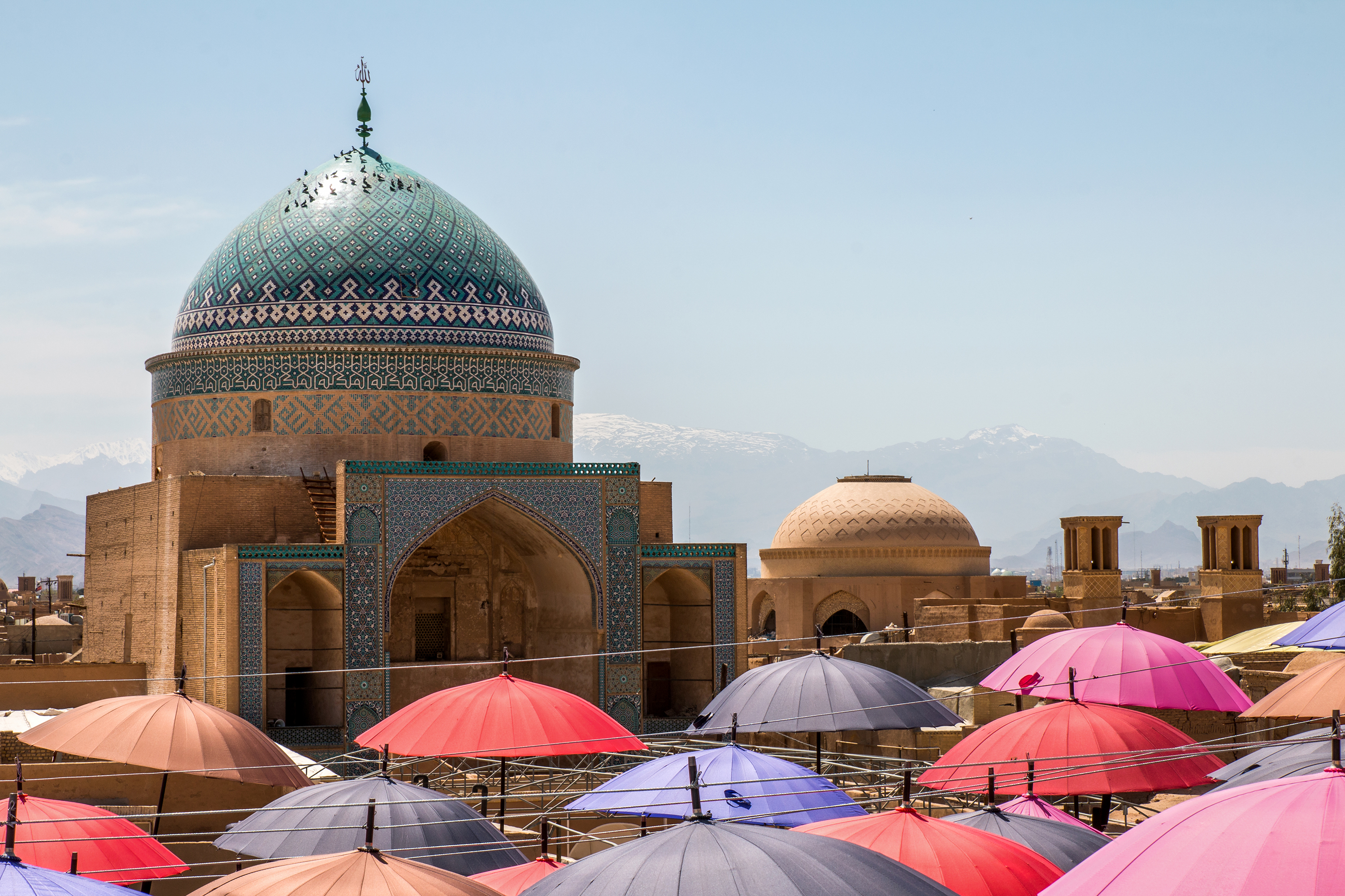
- Amir Chakhmaq Complex Zoroastrian Fire Temple Dowlatabad Garden Jame Mosque Markar Clock Tower Moshir Caravansary Tomb of Sayyed Rukn ad-Din

- Seal

- Location within Iran
- Coordinates: 31°52′56″N 54°20′23″E
- Country: Iran
- Province: Yazd
- County: Yazd
- District: Central

Government
  - Mayor: Abolghasem Mohiodini Anari
  - City Council Chairman: Gholam Hossein Dashti
- Elevation: 1,216 m (3,990 ft)

Population (2016)
  - Total: 529,673
  - Population Rank in Iran: 15th
- Demonym: Yazdi (en)
- Time zone: UTC+3:30 (IRST)
- Area code: 035
- Climate: BWh
- Website: yazd.ir

UNESCO World Heritage Site
- Official name: Historic City of Yazd
- Type: Cultural
- Criteria: iii, v
- Designated: 2017 (41st session)
- Reference no.: 1544
- Region: Asia and the Pacific

Yazd (Persian: یزد; [jæzd]) (Note: Formerly known as Yezd) is a city in the Central District of Yazd County, Yazd province, Iran, serving as capital of the province, the county, and the district. At the 2016 census, its population was 529,673. Since 2017, the historical city of Yazd is recognized as a World Heritage Site by UNESCO.

Because of generations of adaptations to its desert surroundings, Yazd is known for its Persian architecture. It is nicknamed the "City of Windcatchers" (شهر بادگیرها Shahr-e Badgirha) from its many examples. It is also very well known for its Zoroastrian fire temples, ab anbars (cisterns), qanats (underground channels), yakhchals (coolers), Persian handicrafts, handwoven cloth (Persian termeh), silk weaving, Persian cotton candy, and its time-honored confectioneries. Yazd is also known as City of Bicycles, because of its early adoption of cycling, and its boasting the highest number of bicycles per capita in Iran. It is reported that bicycle culture in Iran originated in Yazd as a result of contact with European visitors and tourists in the nineteenth century.

== Etymology ==
Yazd means "pure" and "holy"; Yazd City means "City of the Holy [One, i. e., God]". Former names of this city: Kath, Isatis.

== History ==
Archeological evidence 12 kilometers north of Yazd suggests that the area has been populated since the period of the Achaemenid Empire (550 BC–330 BC). In his Natural History, Pliny the Elder (died 79 AD) mentions a town in the Parthian Empire (247 BC–224 AD) named "Issatis", which is seemingly connected to the name of the Asagarta/Istachae/Sagartians. As a result, some scholars have suggested that the name of Yazd was derived from Issatis (also transliterated as Isatichae, Ysatis, Yasatis), and that the latter name started to be used in the Median or Achaemenid eras.

The area encompassing Yazd first started to gain prominence in the Late antiquity, namely under the Sasanian Empire (224–651). Under Yazdegerd I (r. 399–420), a mint was established in Yazd (under the mint abbreviation of "YZ"), which demonstrates its increasing importance. According to the New Persian chronicle Tarikh-i Yazd ("History of Yazd") of 1441, Yazd was re-founded by "Yazdegerd, son of Bahram", i.e. Yazdegerd II (r. 438–457). The word yazd means God. After the Muslim conquest, many Zoroastrians migrated to Yazd from neighboring provinces. By paying a levy, Yazd was allowed to remain Zoroastrian even after its conquest, and Islam only gradually became the dominant religion in the city.

Due to its secluded desert setting and challenging access, Yazd was mostly spared from major conflicts and the devastation and havoc of warfare. For instance, it was a haven for those fleeing from destruction in other parts of the Khwarazmian Empire during the Mongol invasion. In 1272 it was visited by Marco Polo, who remarked on the city's fine silk-weaving industry. In the book The Travels of Marco Polo, he described Yazd in the following way:

It is a good and noble city, and has a great amount of trade. They weave there quantities of a certain silk tissue known as Yasdi, which merchants carry into many quarters to dispose of. When you leave this city to travel further, you ride for seven days over great plains, finding harbour to receive you at three places only. There are many fine woods producing dates upon the way, such as one can easily ride through; and in them there is great sport to be had in hunting and hawking, there being partridges and quails and abundance of other game, so that the merchants who pass that way have plenty of diversion. There are also wild asses, handsome creatures. At the end of those seven marches over the plain, you come to a fine kingdom which is called Kerman.

Yazd briefly served as the capital of the Muzaffarid Dynasty in the fourteenth century, and was unsuccessfully besieged in 1350–1351 by the Injuids under Abu Ishaq Inju. The Friday mosque, arguably the city's greatest architectural landmark, as well as other important buildings, date to this period. During the Qajar Empire (18th century AD) it was ruled by the Bakhtiari Khans.

Under the rule of the Safavid Empire (16th century), some people migrated from Yazd and settled in an area that is today on the Iran-Afghanistan border. The settlement, which was named Yazdi, was located in what is now Farah City in the province of the same name in Afghanistan. Even today, people from this area speak with an accent very similar to that of the people of Yazd.

One of the notable things about Yazd is its family-centered culture. According to official statistics from Iran's National Organization for Civil Registration, Yazd is among the three cities with the lowest divorce rates in Iran.

== Demographics ==
Historical population
Year	Pop.	±% p.a.
1986	230,483	—
1991	275,298	+3.62%
1996	326,776	+3.49%
2006	432,194	+2.84%
2011	486,152	+2.38%
2016	529,673	+1.73%

=== Language and ethnicity ===
The majority of the people of Yazd are Persians. They speak Persian with a Yazdi accent, which is different from the Persian accent of Tehran.

During the Pahlavi era, a large group of Kurds from the Gulbaghi tribe were moved from the north of Kurdistan province to the city of Yazd and the cities of Isfahan, Kashan, and Nayin. Today, the Gulbaghi tribe are mostly assimilated elements in the population of these cities.

=== Religion ===
The majority of people in Yazd are Shia Muslims. Yazd is a strongly religious, traditionalist and conservative city. Several city traditions are the Muslim parades and gatherings, which are mainly processions called Azadari held to commemorate the events experienced by the main Islamic martyrs and other important figures. These huge public gatherings created a series of spaces which, since most are near important urban monuments, are used at other times as hubs from which visitors can tour the main spots in the city.

There is also a sizable population of Zoroastrians in the city. In 2013, Sepanta Niknam was elected to the city council of Yazd and became the first Zoroastrian councillor in Iran. The Pir-e-Naraki sanctuary is one of the important pilgrimage destinations for Zoroastrians, where an annual congregation is held and frequent visits are made during the year; it is now also a famous tourist spot. The story of the last Persian prince to come to Yazd before the arrival of Islam adds to its importance. Such a transformation has occurred several times.

There was once a relatively large Jewish-Yazdi community, however, after the creation of Israel, many have moved there for varying reasons. Former president of Israel Moshe Katsav is an example.

=== Population ===
At the time of the 2006 National Census, the city's population was 423,006 in 114,716 households. The following census in 2011 counted 486,152 people in 141,572 households. The 2016 census measured the population of the city as 529,673 people in 158,368 households.

== Geography ==
=== Climate ===
Yazd has a hot desert climate (Köppen climate classification BWh). It is the driest major city in Iran, with a yearly precipitation amount that is less than 60 millimetres (2.4 in), and has only 11.5 days of precipitation. Summer temperatures are frequently above 40 °C (104 °F) in blazing sunshine with low humidity, on 35.3 days per year the maximum daily temperature reaches or exceeds 40 °C (104 °F). Even at night the temperatures in summer are rather uncomfortable. In the winter, the days remain mild and sunny, but in the morning the thin air and low cloudiness cause cold temperatures, with 24.3 days per year in which the minimum temperature falls below 0 °C (32 °F).

Dust events are not uncommon in Yazd, as they happen 52 days per year. Thick haze is much more common (135.8 days annually) and is more frequent in winter.

Climate data for Yazd (normals 1991-2020, records 1952-present)
Month	Jan	Feb	Mar	Apr	May	Jun	Jul	Aug	Sep	Oct	Nov	Dec	Year
Record high °C (°F)	27.0 (80.6)	29.4 (84.9)	35.2 (95.4)	38.0 (100.4)	41.4 (106.5)	44.5 (112.1)	46.1 (115.0)	45.6 (114.1)	42.0 (107.6)	36.4 (97.5)	32.6 (90.7)	28.5 (83.3)	46.1 (115.0)
Mean daily maximum °C (°F)	13.3 (55.9)	16.8 (62.2)	21.5 (70.7)	27.4 (81.3)	32.9 (91.2)	38.3 (100.9)	40.1 (104.2)	38.5 (101.3)	34.9 (94.8)	28.4 (83.1)	20.2 (68.4)	15.2 (59.4)	27.3 (81.1)
Daily mean °C (°F)	6.6 (43.9)	9.8 (49.6)	14.7 (58.5)	20.6 (69.1)	26.1 (79.0)	31.5 (88.7)	33.5 (92.3)	31.4 (88.5)	27.4 (81.3)	20.8 (69.4)	12.9 (55.2)	8.0 (46.4)	20.3 (68.5)
Mean daily minimum °C (°F)	1.3 (34.3)	3.9 (39.0)	8.4 (47.1)	14.0 (57.2)	19.2 (66.6)	23.9 (75.0)	26.1 (79.0)	23.6 (74.5)	19.5 (67.1)	13.7 (56.7)	7.0 (44.6)	2.6 (36.7)	13.6 (56.5)
Record low °C (°F)	−14 (7)	−10.1 (13.8)	−7 (19)	0.0 (32.0)	2.0 (35.6)	11.0 (51.8)	16.0 (60.8)	12.0 (53.6)	2.0 (35.6)	−3 (27)	−10 (14)	−16 (3)	−16 (3)
Average precipitation mm (inches)	11.2 (0.44)	6.2 (0.24)	10.6 (0.42)	5.6 (0.22)	3.6 (0.14)	0.4 (0.02)	0.0 (0.0)	0.0 (0.0)	0.0 (0.0)	0.9 (0.04)	4.6 (0.18)	9.1 (0.36)	52.2 (2.06)
Average snowfall cm (inches)	3.1 (1.2)	0.2 (0.1)	0.0 (0.0)	0.0 (0.0)	0.0 (0.0)	0.0 (0.0)	0.0 (0.0)	0.0 (0.0)	0.0 (0.0)	0.0 (0.0)	0.0 (0.0)	1.1 (0.4)	4.4 (1.7)
Average precipitation days (≥ 1.0 mm)	2.5	1.3	1.9	1.8	0.9	0.1	0.0	0.0	0.0	0.2	1	1.8	11.5
Average snowy days	2.1	0.5	0.2	0	0	0	0	0	0	0	0	0.9	3.7
Average relative humidity (%)	50	39	32	28	21	14	14	14	15	24	37	47	28
Average dew point °C (°F)	−5.1 (22.8)	−5.5 (22.1)	−4.6 (23.7)	−1.0 (30.2)	0.1 (32.2)	−0.8 (30.6)	0.7 (33.3)	−0.8 (30.6)	−2.8 (27.0)	−2.3 (27.9)	−3.2 (26.2)	−4.3 (24.3)	−2.5 (27.6)
Mean monthly sunshine hours	215	220	246	260	315	353	355	357	320	294	230	216	3,381
Source 1: NOAA NCEI (snowfall and sleet/snow days 1981-2010)
Source 2: IRIMO(extremes

Climate data for Yazd (1951-2010, records and temperature normals 1951-2020)
Month	Jan	Feb	Mar	Apr	May	Jun	Jul	Aug	Sep	Oct	Nov	Dec	Year
Record high °C (°F)	27.0 (80.6)	29.4 (84.9)	35.2 (95.4)	38.0 (100.4)	41.0 (105.8)	44.1 (111.4)	45.6 (114.1)	45.6 (114.1)	42.0 (107.6)	36.4 (97.5)	30.8 (87.4)	28.5 (83.3)	45.6 (114.1)
Mean daily maximum °C (°F)	12.7 (54.9)	16.0 (60.8)	21.0 (69.8)	26.9 (80.4)	32.5 (90.5)	38.1 (100.6)	39.6 (103.3)	38.0 (100.4)	34.5 (94.1)	27.8 (82.0)	19.9 (67.8)	14.5 (58.1)	26.8 (80.2)
Daily mean °C (°F)	6.4 (43.5)	9.3 (48.7)	14.2 (57.6)	19.9 (67.8)	25.3 (77.5)	30.5 (86.9)	32.3 (90.1)	30.2 (86.4)	26.3 (79.3)	19.9 (67.8)	12.7 (54.9)	7.8 (46.0)	19.6 (67.2)
Mean daily minimum °C (°F)	-0 (32)	2.6 (36.7)	7.4 (45.3)	12.9 (55.2)	18.0 (64.4)	22.8 (73.0)	24.9 (76.8)	22.3 (72.1)	18.1 (64.6)	12.0 (53.6)	5.5 (41.9)	1.1 (34.0)	12.3 (54.1)
Record low °C (°F)	−14 (7)	−10.1 (13.8)	−7 (19)	0.0 (32.0)	2.0 (35.6)	11.0 (51.8)	16.0 (60.8)	12.0 (53.6)	2.0 (35.6)	−3 (27)	−10 (14)	−16 (3)	−16 (3)
Average precipitation mm (inches)	12.2 (0.48)	7.6 (0.30)	12.5 (0.49)	7.3 (0.29)	3.6 (0.14)	0.3 (0.01)	0.2 (0.01)	0.1 (0.00)	0.1 (0.00)	1.2 (0.05)	4.1 (0.16)	10.0 (0.39)	59.2 (2.32)
Average precipitation days	4.8	3.5	4.8	4.3	2.2	0.3	0.2	0.1	0.1	0.8	2.2	3.7	27
Average snowy days	2.1	0.8	0.2	0.0	0.0	0.0	0.0	0.0	0.0	0.0	0.1	0.8	4
Average relative humidity (%)	54	44	37	32	25	18	17	17	19	27	38	50	32
Mean monthly sunshine hours	194.1	210.3	225.4	246.2	302.7	343.1	347.2	346.1	316.4	286.9	226.2	200.3	3,244.9
Source 1:
Source 2: IRIMO (extremes, sun, humidity, 1952–2010)

== Historical sites ==
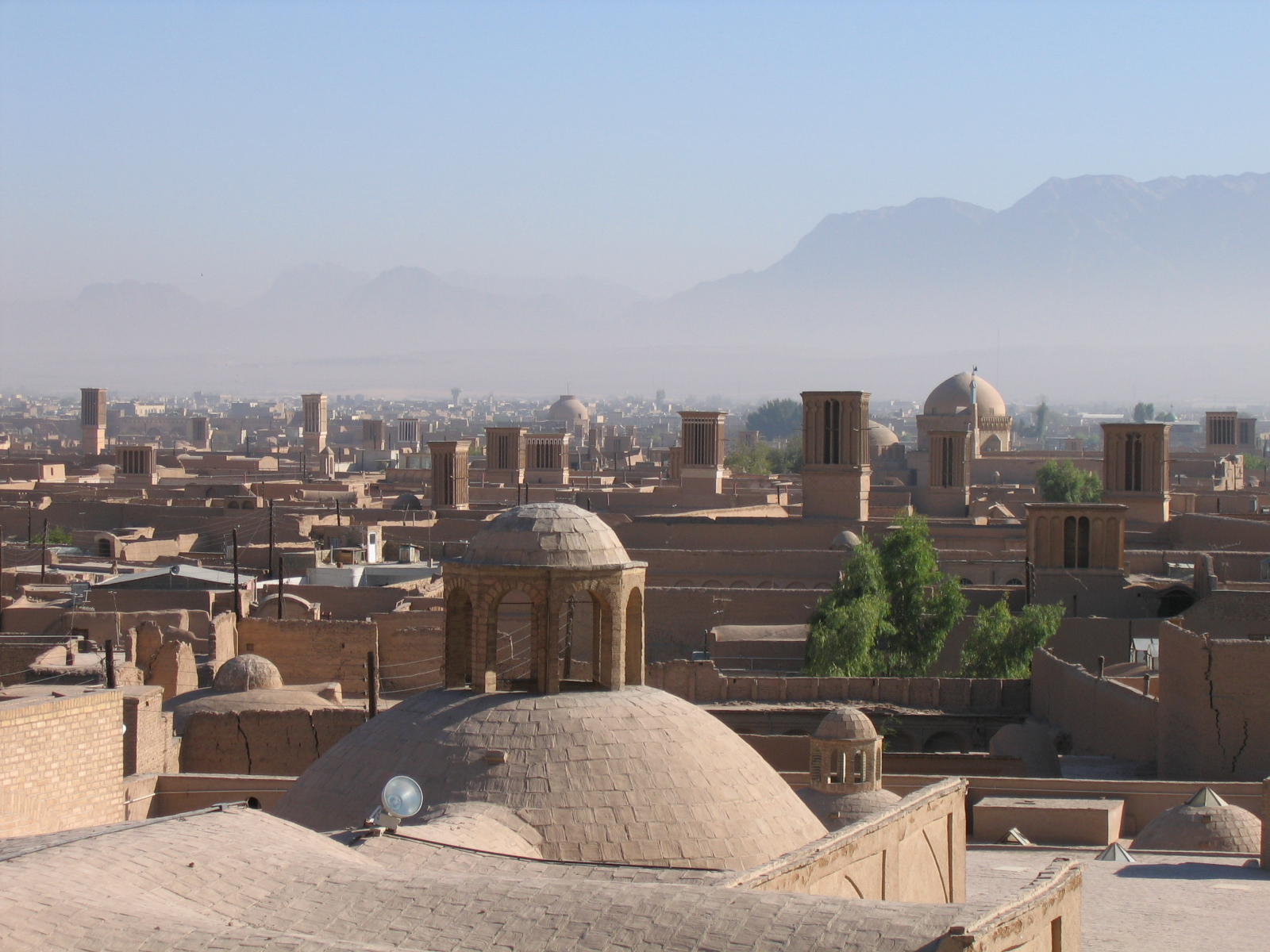
Wind towers and domes form part of the skyline of Yazd

Yazd is an important centre of Iranian architecture. Because of its climate, it has one of the largest networks of qanats (underground water supply systems) in the world, and Yazdi qanat makers are considered the most skilled in Iran.

External videos
- Iranian city uses ancient techniques to defy summer heat - AFP . Iranian city uses ancient techniques to defy summer heat - AFP

To deal with the extremely hot summers, many old buildings in Yazd have wind towers and large underground areas.

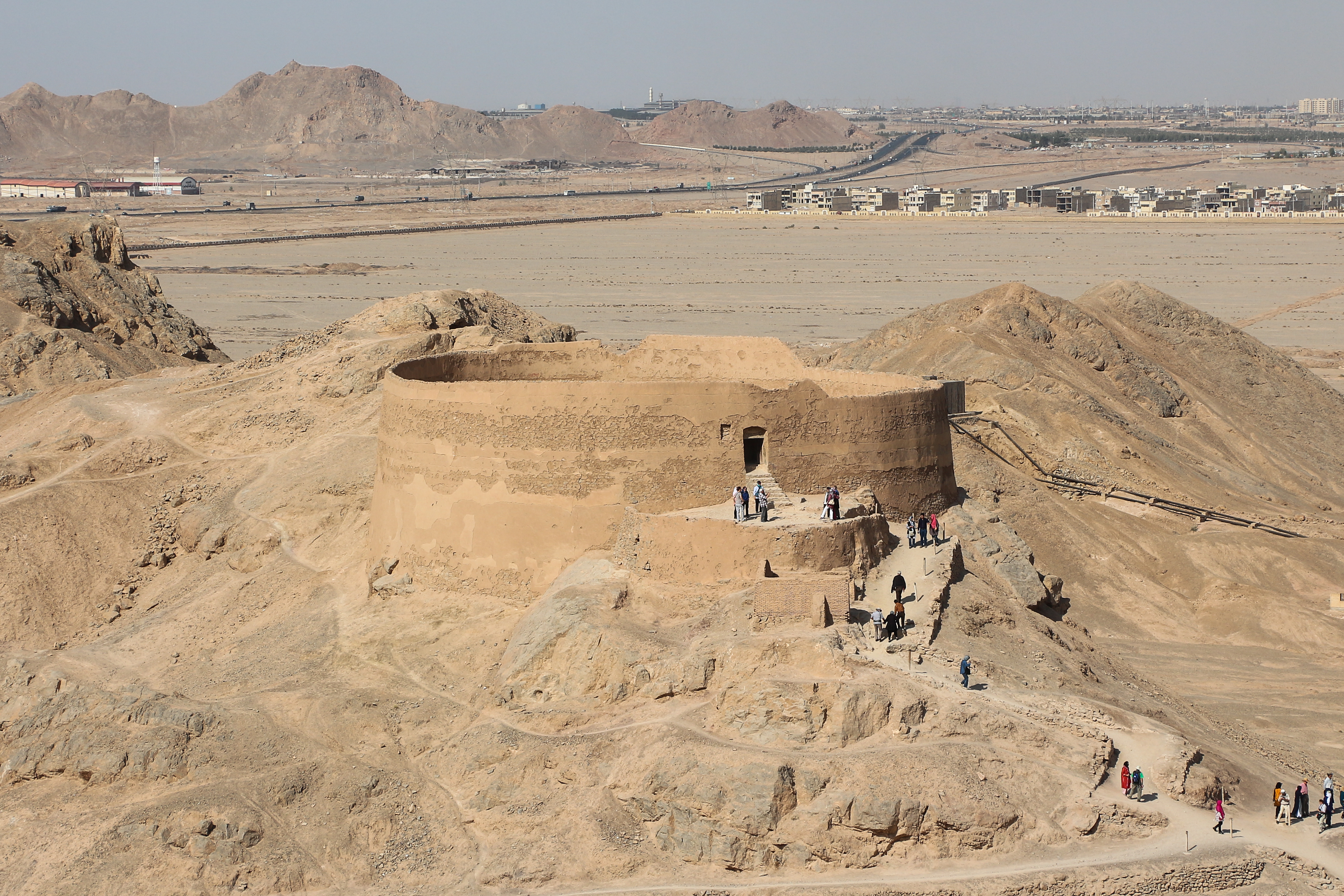
Yazd Tower of Silence

The city is also home to prime examples of yakhchals, which were used to store ice retrieved from glaciers in the nearby mountains. Yazd is also one of the largest cities built almost entirely out of adobe.

Yazd's heritage as a center of Zoroastrianism is also important. There is a Tower of Silence on the outskirts, and the city has an ateshkadeh which holds a fire that has been kept alight continuously since 470 AD. Zoroastrians make up a small minority of the population of Yazd, around 1,000 out of 600,000.

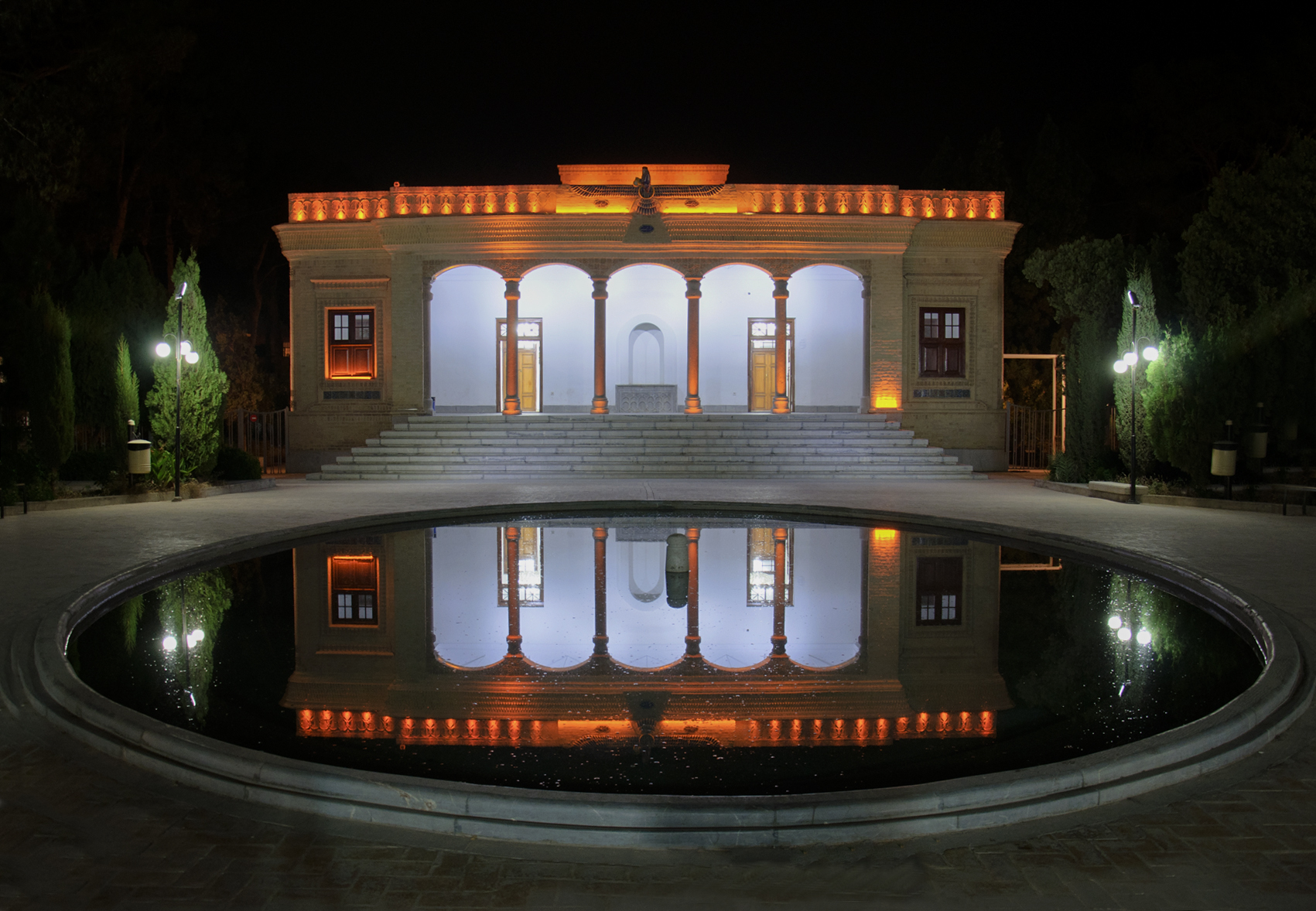
Fire Temple of Yazd

The 11th-century brick mausoleum and shrine Davāzdah Imām is the oldest dated building in the city.

Built in 12th century and still in use, Jame Mosque of Yazd is an example of the finest Persian mosaics and excellent architecture. Its minarets are the highest in the country. Tomb of Sayyed Rukn ad-Din is nearby the mosque.

== Economy ==
Always known for the quality of its silk and carpets, Yazd today is one of Iran's industrial centers for textiles. There is also a considerable ceramics and construction materials industry and unique confectionery and jewellery industries. A significant portion of the population is also employed in other industries including agriculture, dairy, metal works, and machine manufacturing. There are a number of companies involved in the growing information technology industry, mainly manufacturing primary materials such as cables and connectors. Currently Yazd is the home of the largest manufacturer of fibre optics in Iran.

Yazd's confectioneries have a tremendous following throughout Iran and have been a source of tourism for the city. Confectioners workshops (khalifehs, or experts) keep their recipes a guarded secret, and there are many that have remained a private family business for many generations. Baklava, ghotab and pashmak are the most popular sweets made in the city.

In 2000 the Yazd Water Museum opened; it features exhibits of water storage vessels and historical technologies related to water.

Yazd has expanded its industrial fields since the 1980s. With at least three main industrial areas each containing over 70 different factories, Yazd has become one of the most technologically advanced cities of Iran.

== Transportation ==
In addition to its connection with major Iranian cities via Iranian Railways, Yazd is served by the Shahid Sadooghi Airport.

== Politics ==
List of mayors of Yazd
- Eskandar Aslani (circa 1979)
- Muhammad-Ali Vahdati
- Ali-Akbar Farshi
- Muhammad-Hassan Khorshidnam
- Hosseyn A'laii
- Muhammad-Mahdi Sherafat
- Ali-Akbar Aramun
- Morteza Shayeq
- Ali-Akbar Mirvakili
- Mohammad Azim Zadeh (circa 2017)

== Famous residents ==
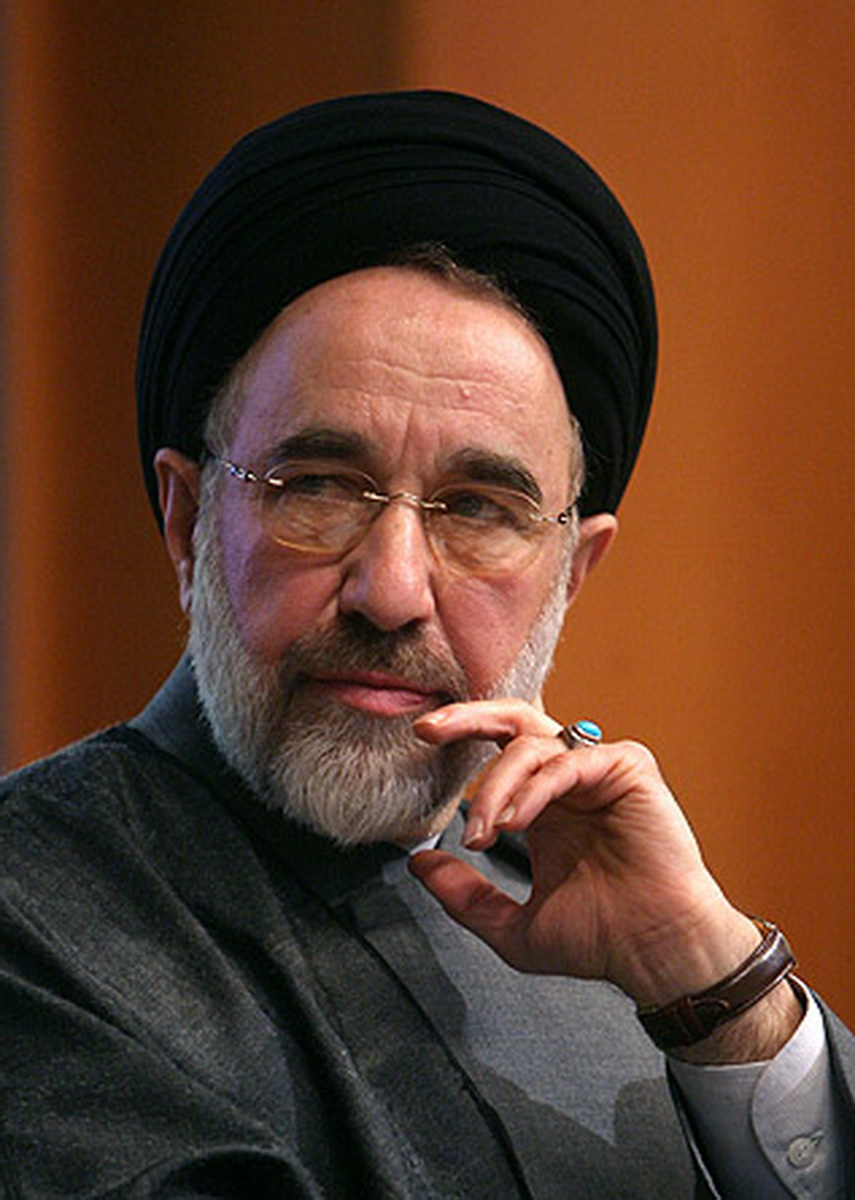
Mohammad Khatami, former president of Iran; born in Ardakan of Yazd.

- Iraj Afshar, bibliographer, historian, and an iconic figure in the field of Persian studies
- Reza Amrollahi, Head of Atomic Energy Organization of Iran 1981–1997
- Mohammad Reza Aref, Vice President of Iran from 2001 to 2005
- Reza Ardakanian, professor, politician and the former Minister of Energy of Iran
- Vahshi Bafghi, poet
- Habibollah Bitaraf, former Minister of Energy
- Ahmad Fardid, philosopher and professor
- Mohammad Ali Jafari, commander of the Army of the Guardians of the Islamic Revolution of Iran
- Moshe Katsav, former President of Israel
- Sems Kesmai, poet
- Mohammad Khatami, former president of Iran; born in Ardakan
- Mohammad-Ali Eslami Nodooshan, author
- Zia'eddin Tabatabaee, Iranian politician and the Prime Minister of Iran
- Mehdi Azar Yazdi, author of children's stories
- Mirza Mohammad Farrokhi Yazdi, poet and politician
- Sharaf ad-Din Ali Yazdi, 15th-century Persian historian.

== Education ==
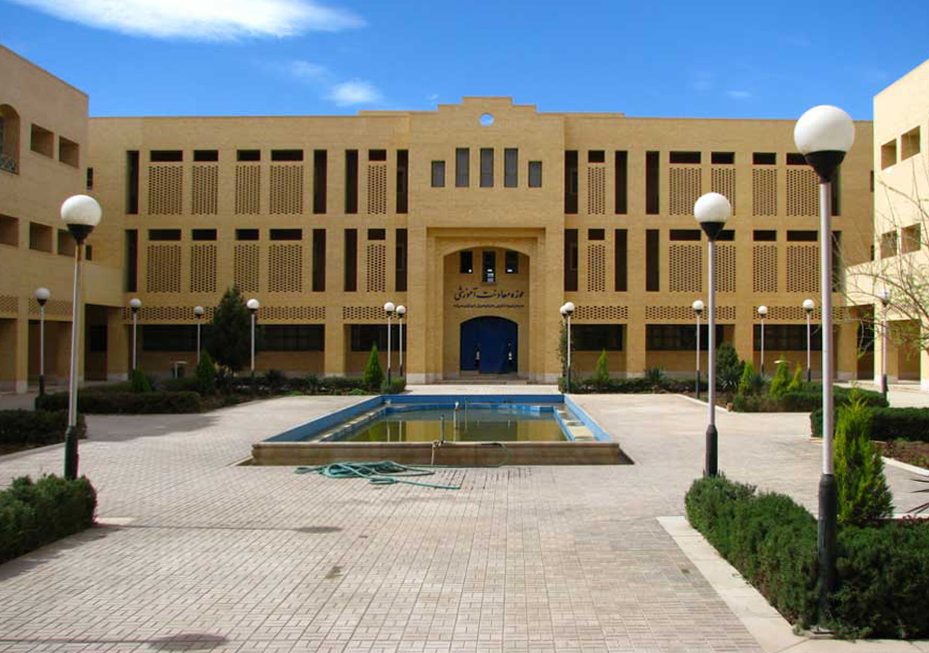
University of Yazd

The University of Yazd was established in 1988. It has a college of architecture specializing in traditional Persian art and architecture. Yazd and its nearby towns contain the following institutes of higher education:

- Yazd Science and Research
- Yazd University
- Shahid Sadoughi University of Medical Sciences and Health Services
- Payam e Nour University of Yazd
- Yazd Institute of Higher Education (ACECR)
- Islamic Azad University of Bafq
- Islamic Azad University of Maybod
- Islamic Azad University of Yazd
- Yazd Sampad Information Center
- Yazd Science and Technology Park
- Applied Science University of Yazd
- Imam Java University College
- Barazande muqadam High School (Tizhushan)
- Shahid Sadoughi High School (Tizhushan)
- Shahid Sadoughi Middle School (Tizhushan)
- Farzanegan Middle School (Tizhushan)
- Bahadori High School
- Farzanegan High School (Tizhushan)
- Iranshahr High School

== Twin towns – sister cities ==
Yazd is twinned with:

- Holguín, Cuba
- Homs, Syria
- Jászberény, Hungary
- (Georgia (country)) Poti, Georgia

== Gallery ==
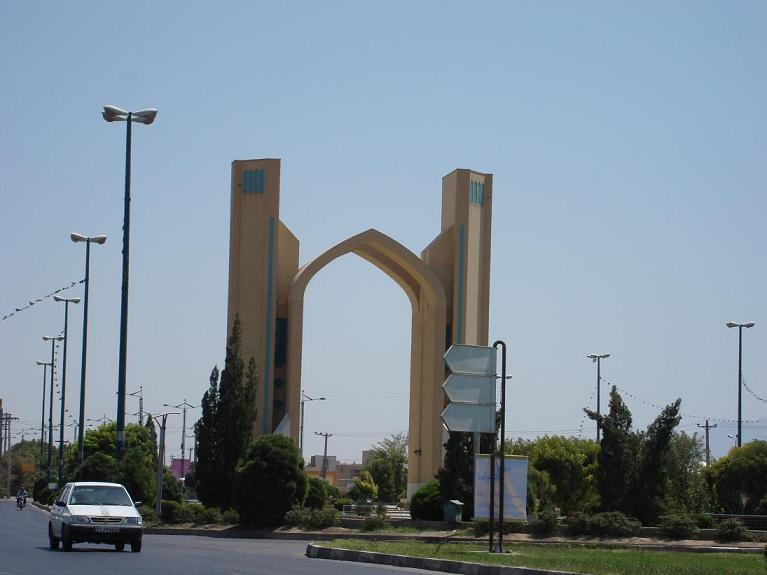
Yazd Entrance

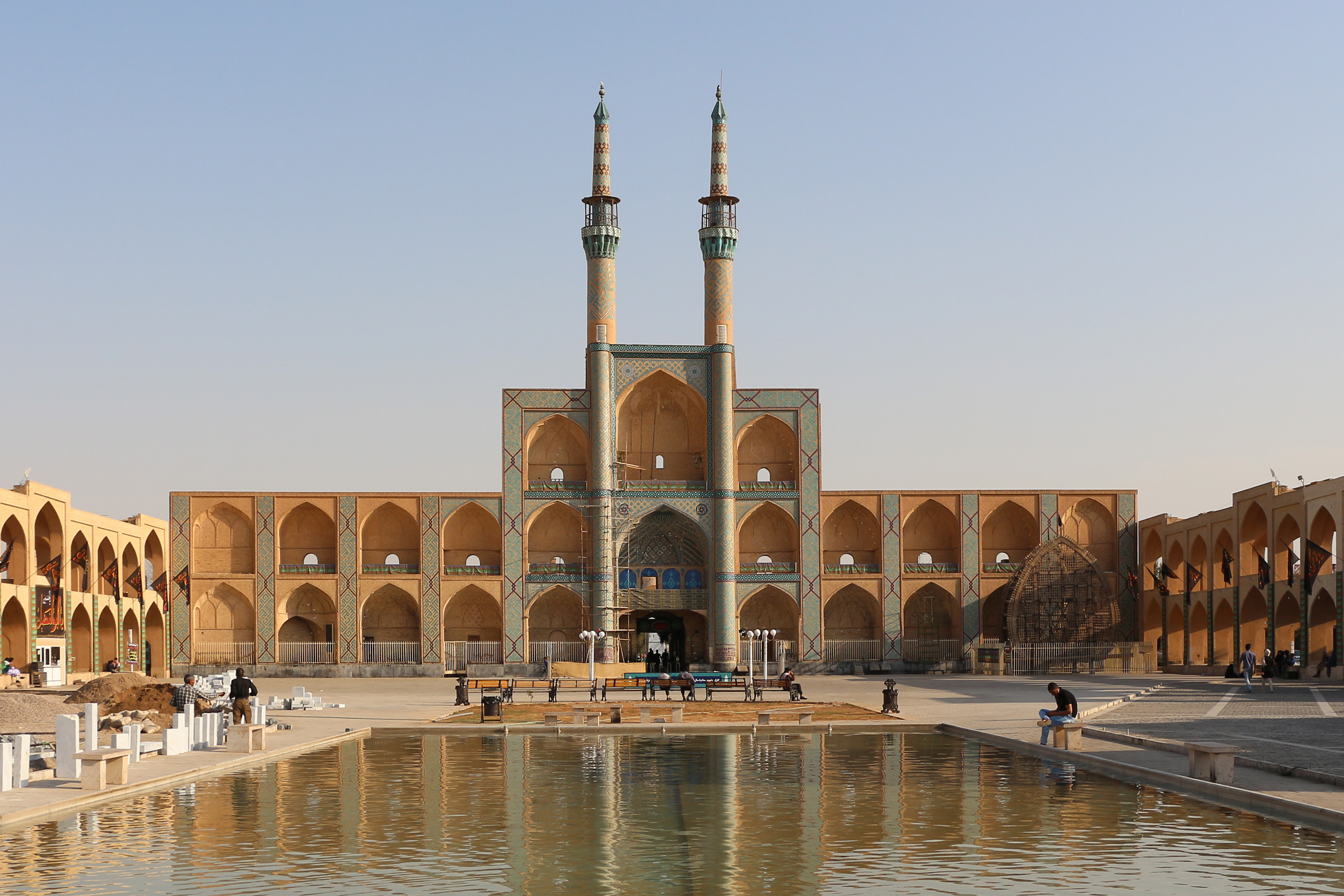
Amir Chakhmaq Complex

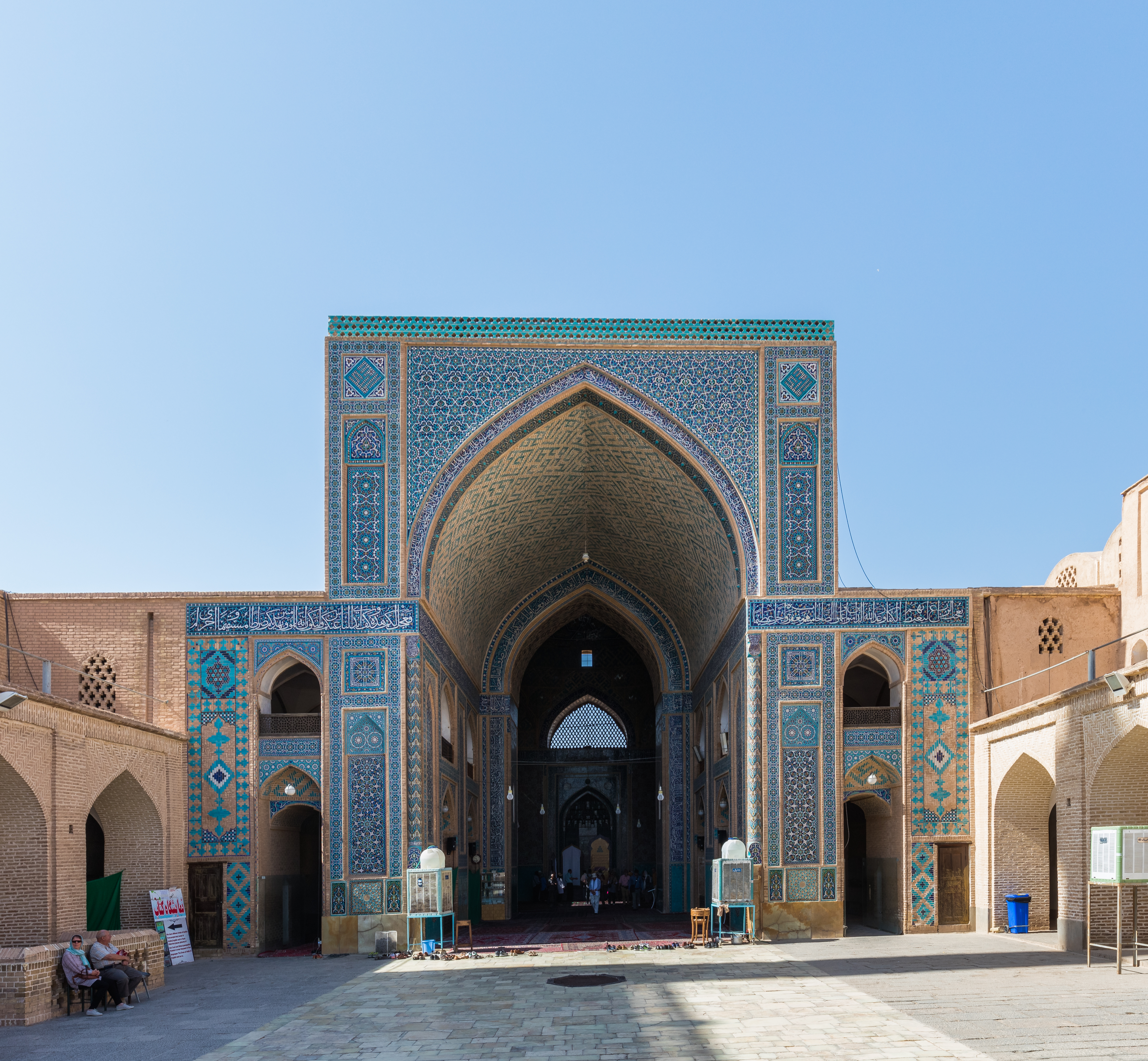
Jameh Mosque

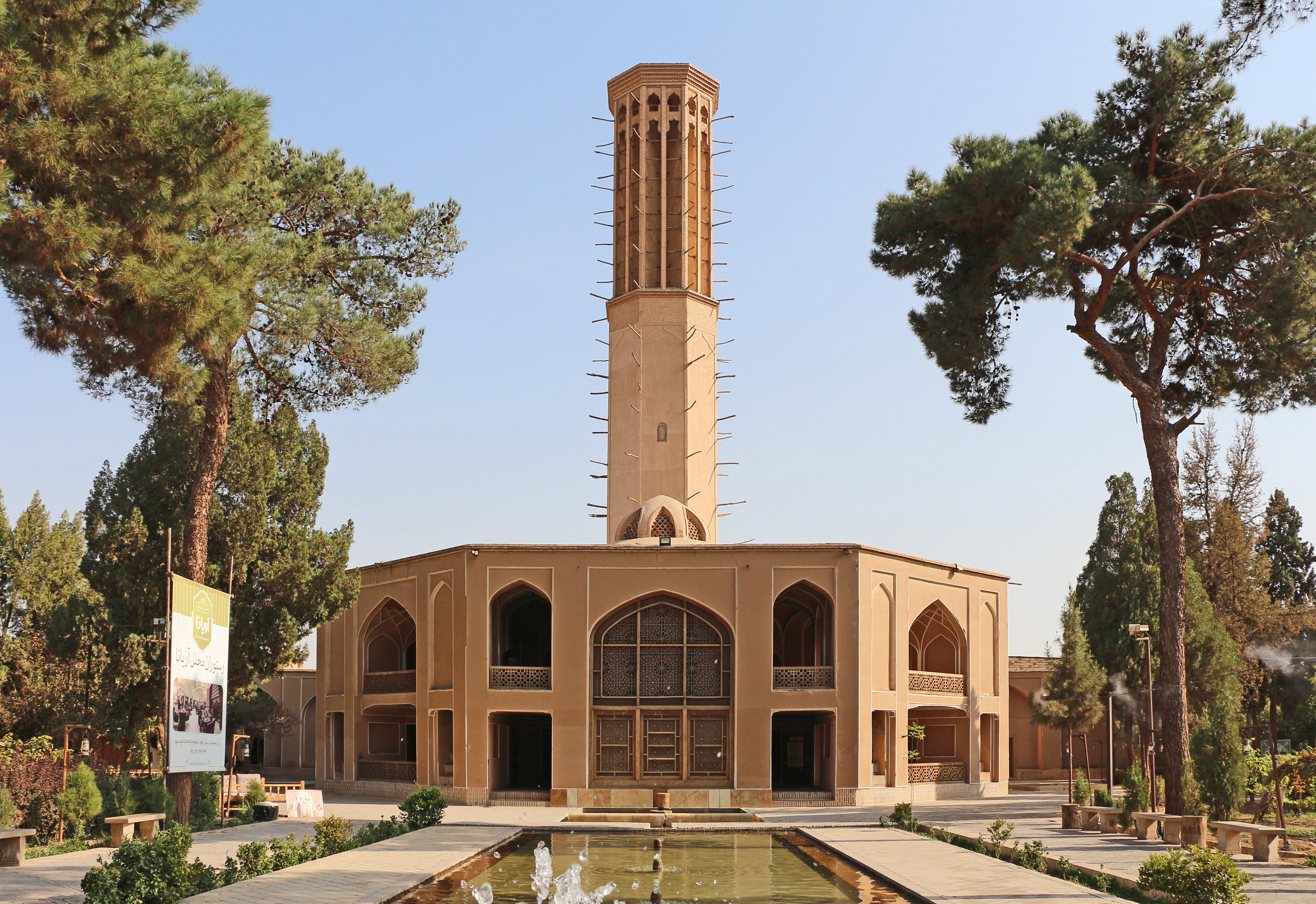
Dowlatabad Garden pavilion with wind tower

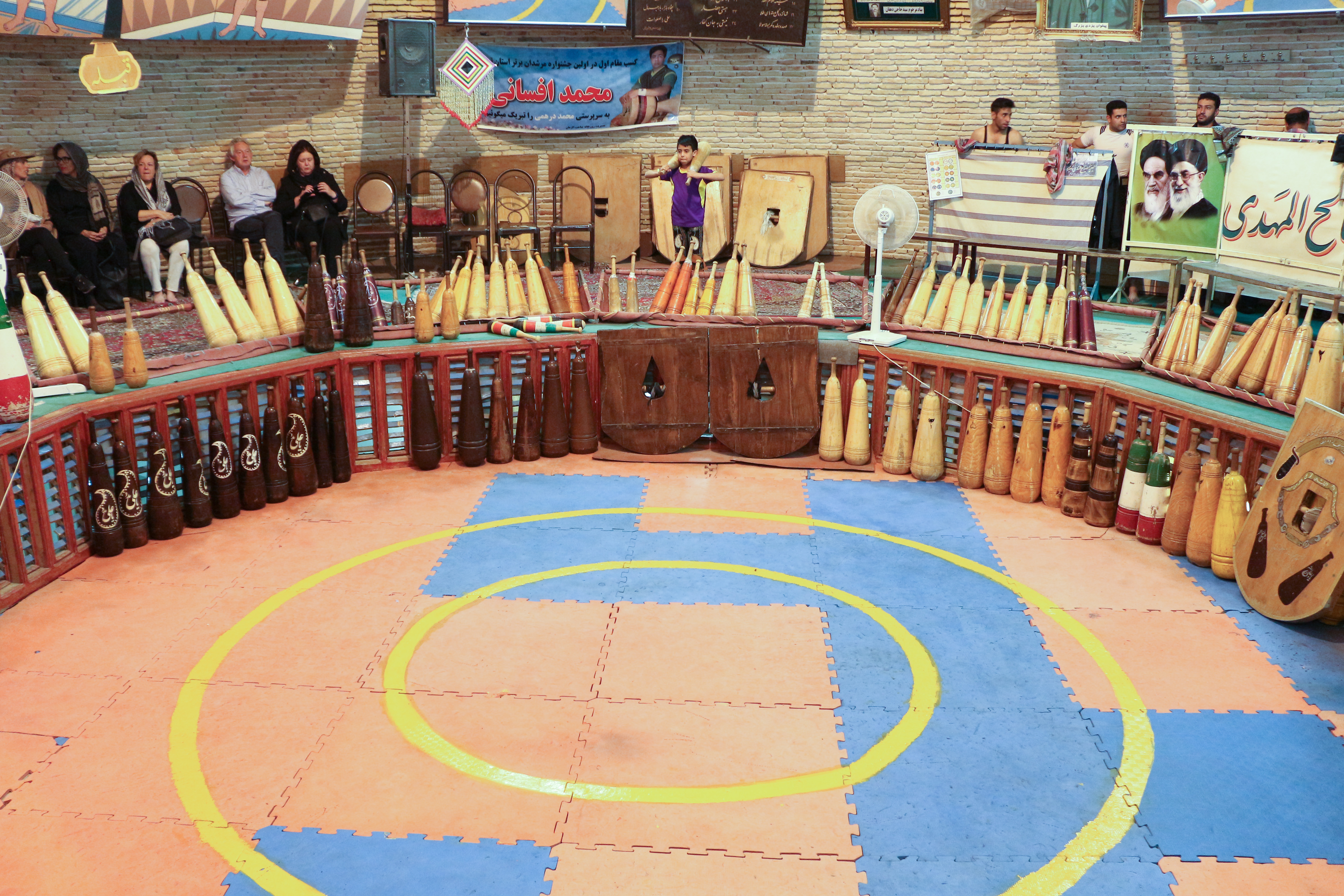
A Zurkhaneh in Yazd

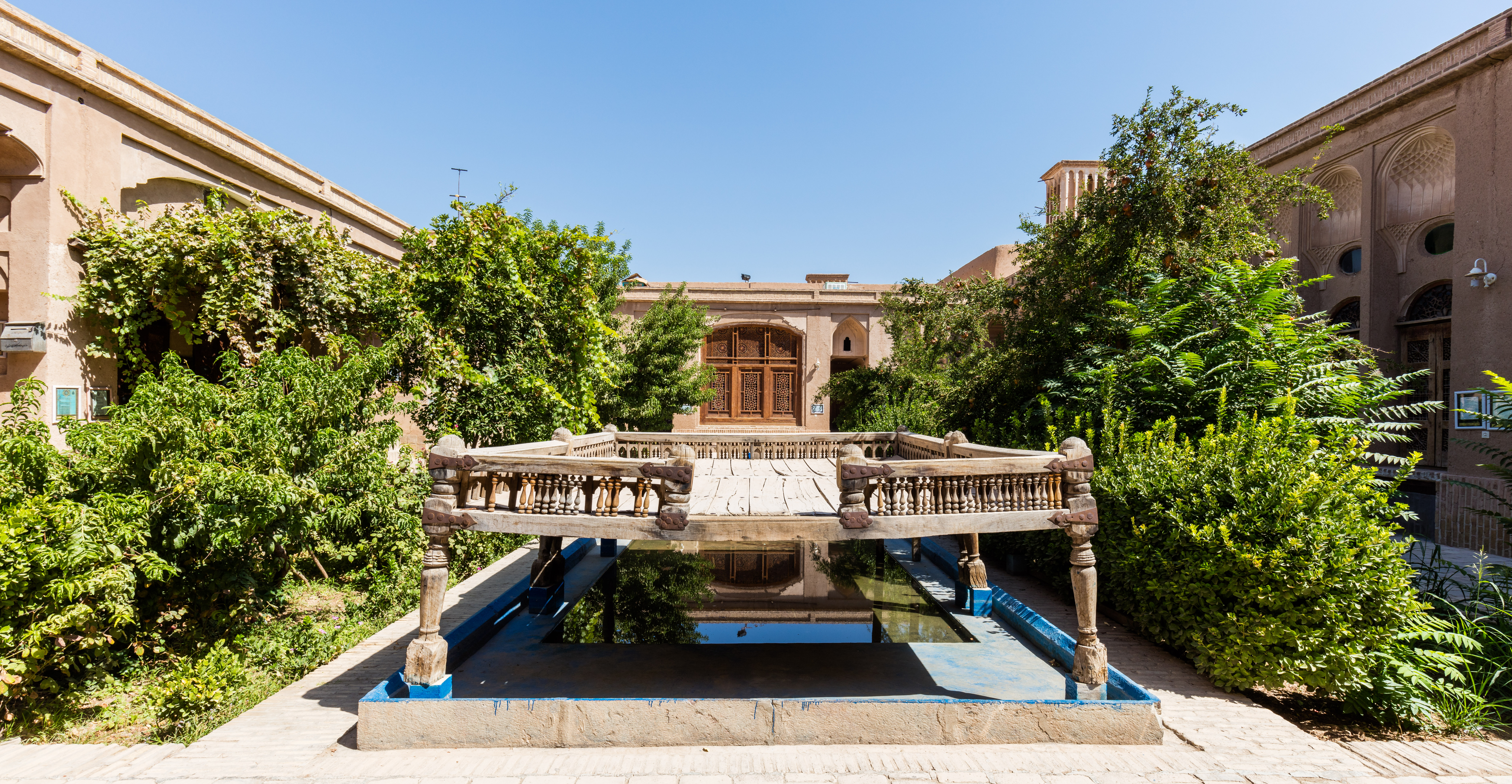
Lari House in Yazd

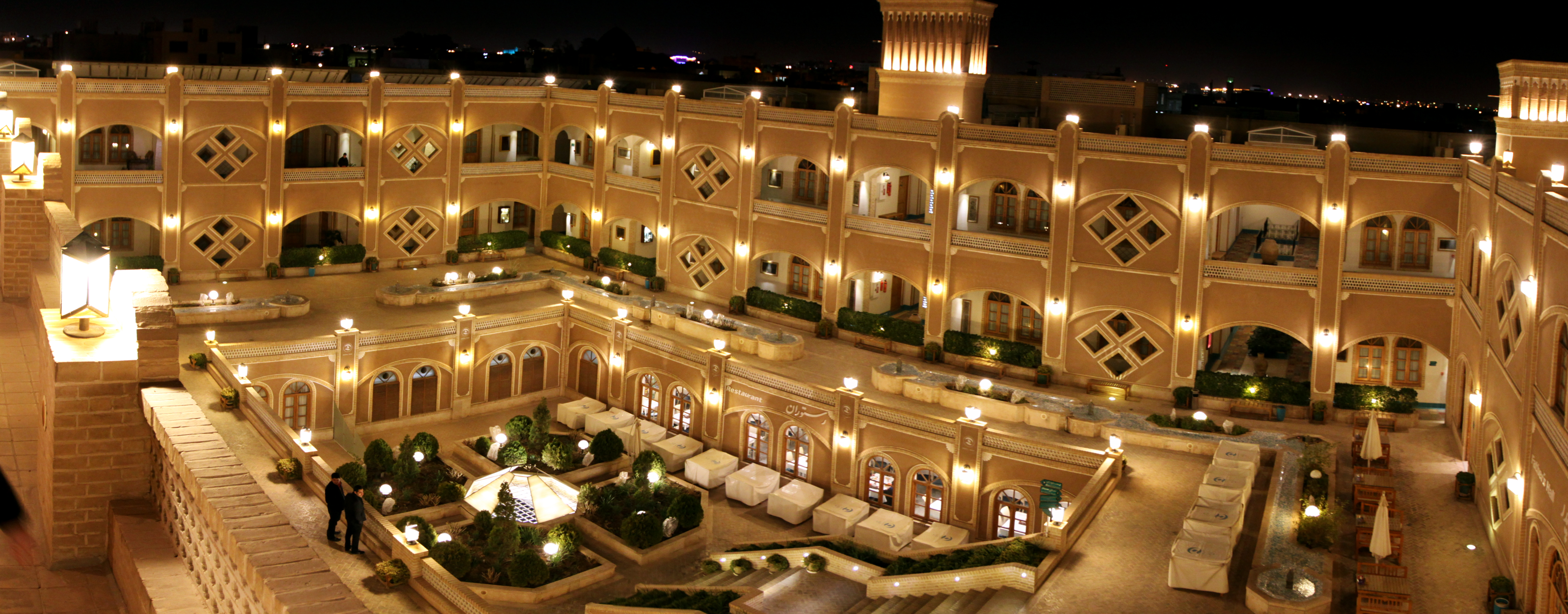
Dad Hotel, Yazd, Iran

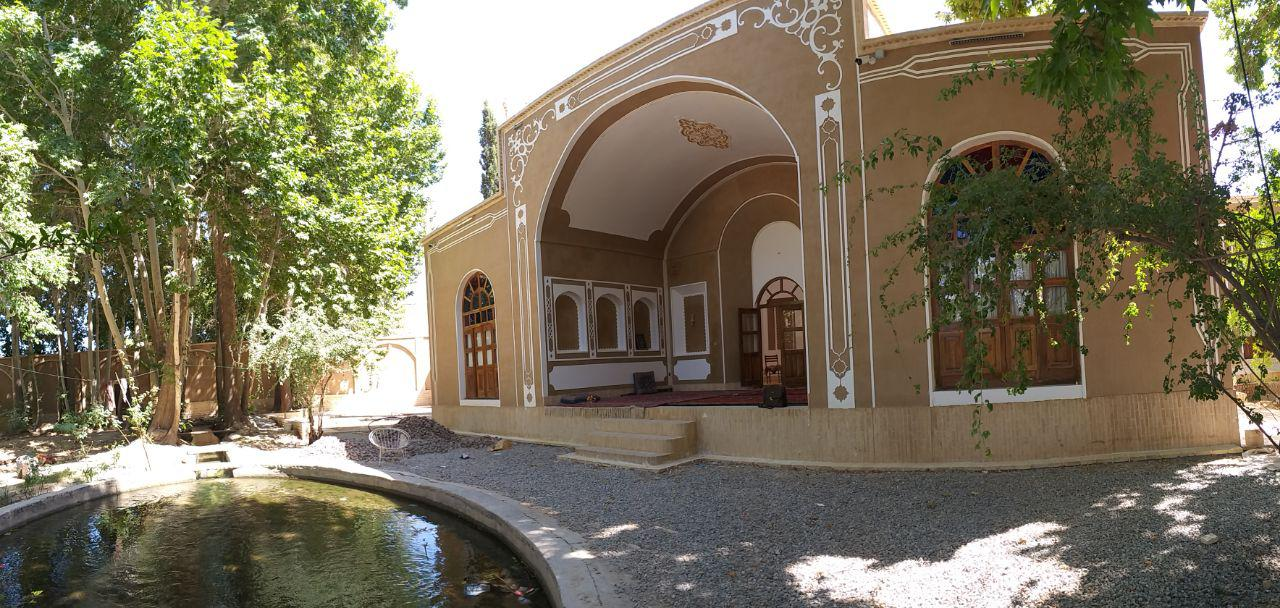
Khoshnevis Garden

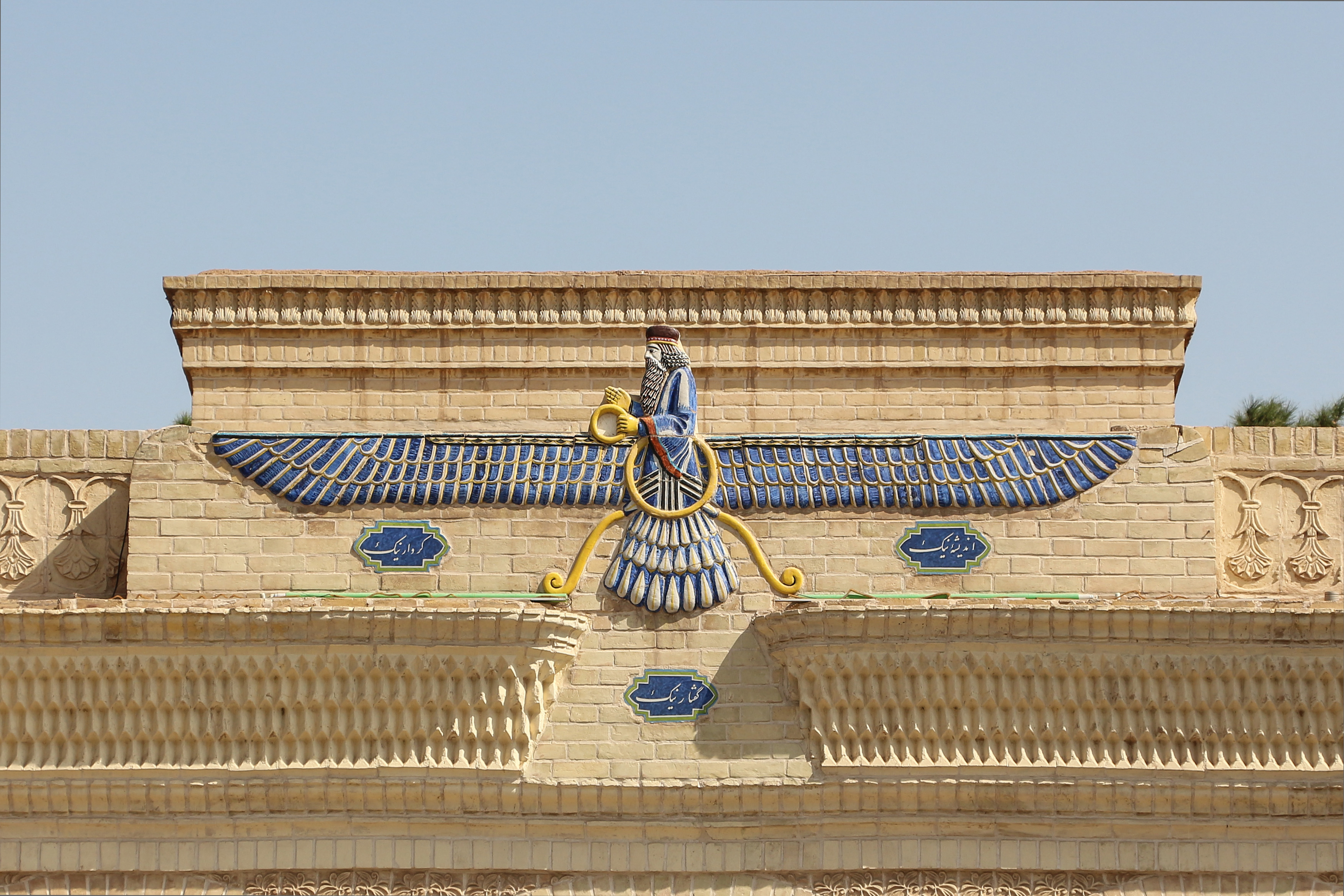

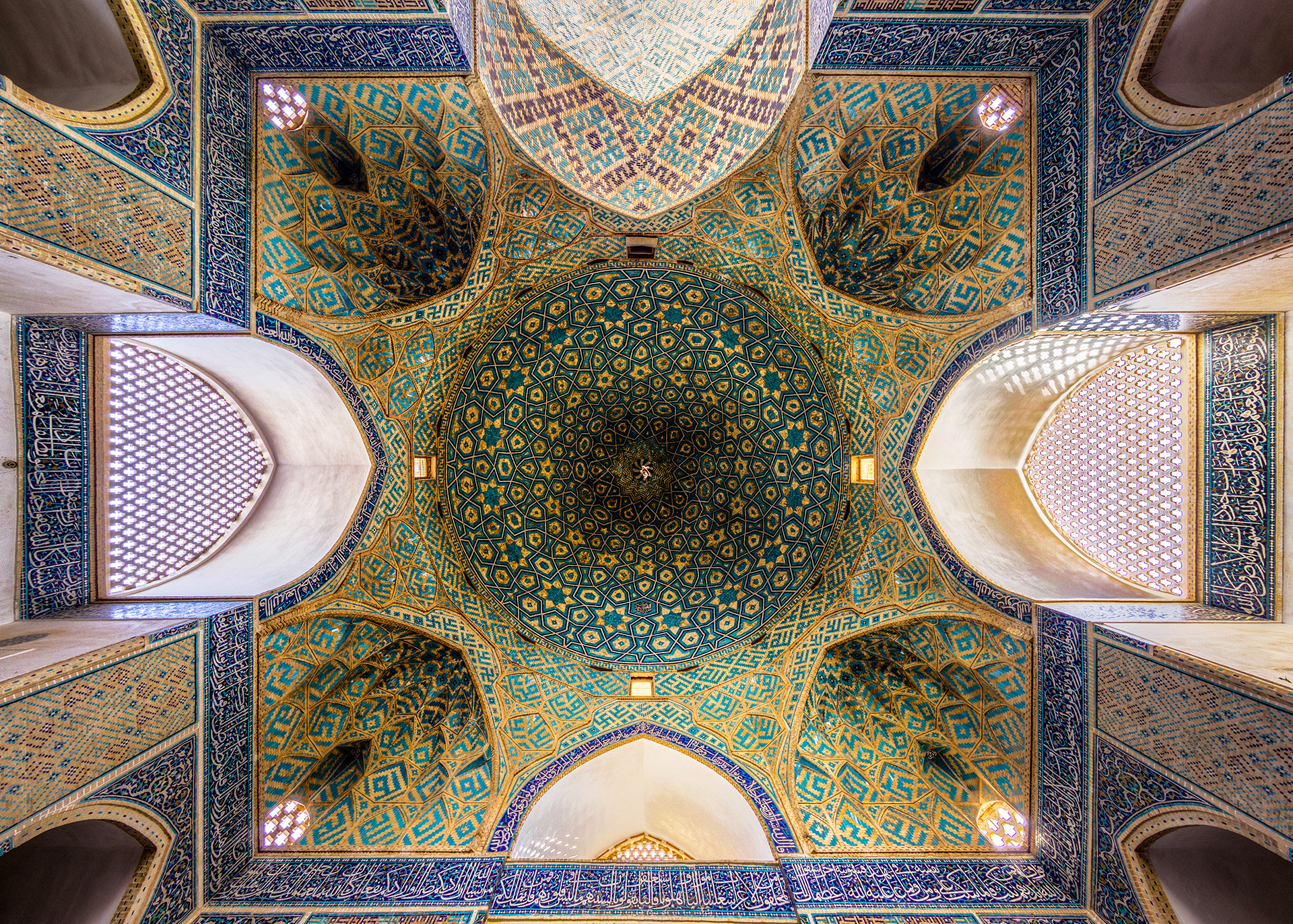

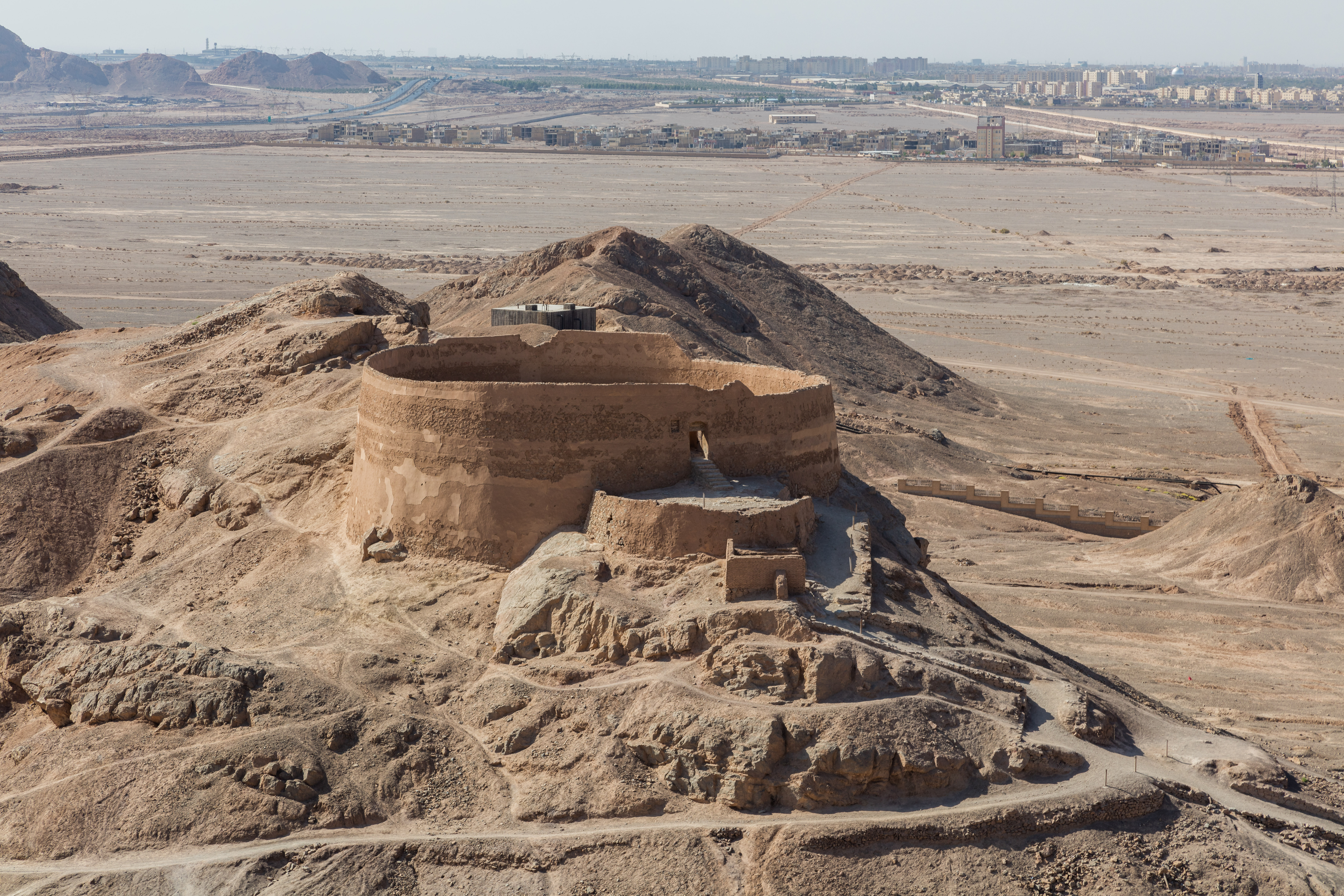

== See also ==
Media related to Yazd at Wikimedia Commons

Yazd travel guide from Wikivoyage
