= Tomb of Sayyed Rukn ad-Din =

Mausoleum in Yazd, Iranian national heritage site

Coordinates: 31°54′04″N 54°22′11″E

- آرامگاه سید رکن الدین
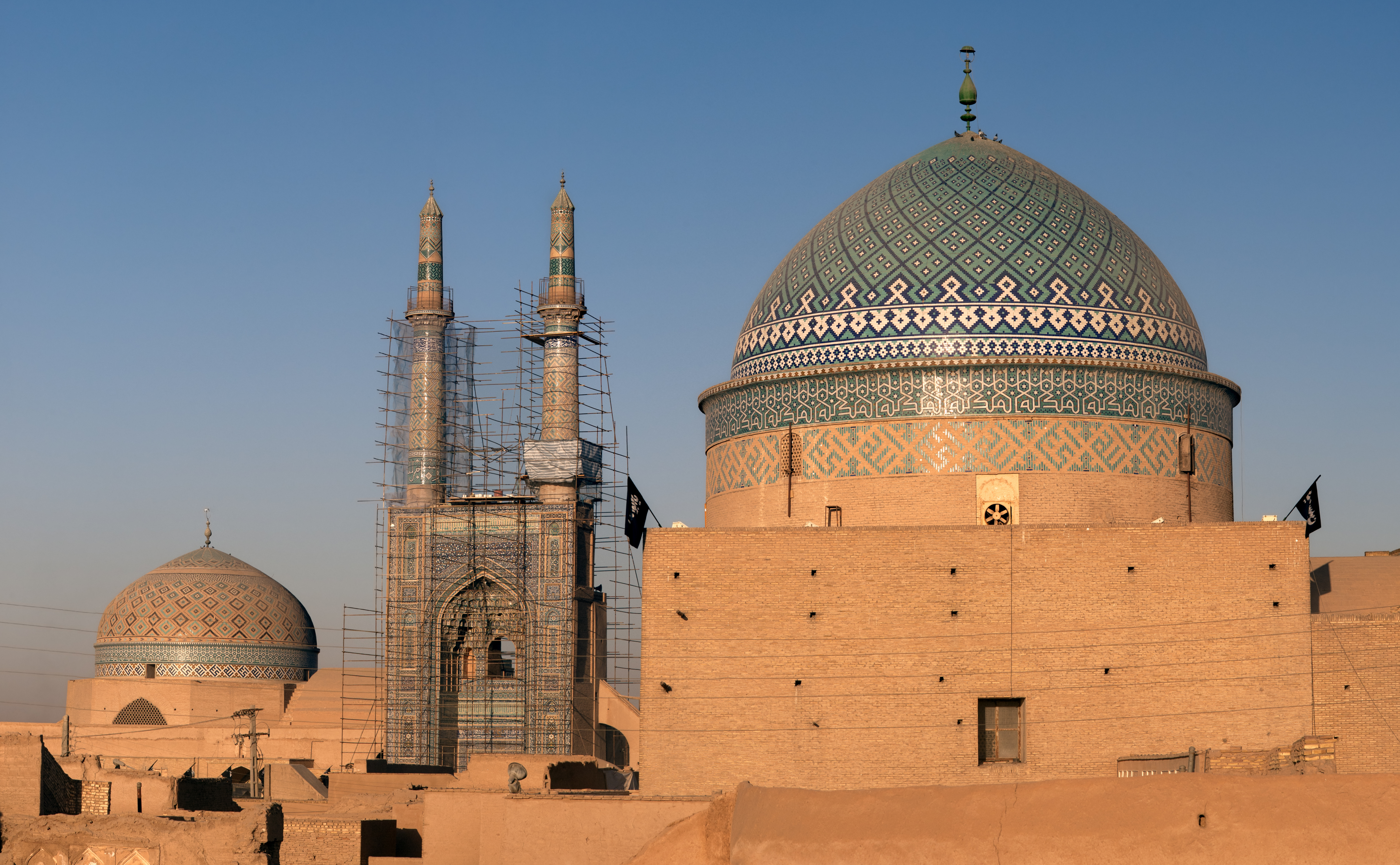
- The mausoleum (right) and the Jama mosque of Yazd (Left)
- Alternative names: Sayyed Rukn ad-Din Madrasa

General information
- Status: Under repair

Iran National Heritage List
- Official name: Mausoleum of Seyyed Rokneddin
- Type: Mausoleum
- Designated: 1935
- Reference no.: 246
- Conservation organization: Cultural Heritage, Handicrafts and Tourism Organization of Iran
- Location: Yazd, Iran

The Tomb of Sayyed Rukn ad-Din (Persian: آرامگاه سید رکن الدین) or the Sayyed Rukn ad-Din Madrasa (Persian: مدرسه سید رکن الدین) is a 14th century mausoleum in Yazd, Iran. It is the burial place of Sayyed Rukn ad-Din Mohammad Qazi Hosseini Yazdi (Persian: سید رکن الدین محمد قاضی حسینی یزدی) who served as the chief Qadi of Yazd for a while.

== History ==
Sayyed Rukn ad-Din was a cleric and scholar of the city of Yazd. Due to him being involved in sect conflicts in the city, Atabeg Yusof Shah arrested and imprisoned Rukn ad-Din in Khormiz castle. Following this Rukn ad-Din's son, Shams ad-Din, traveled to Tabriz and managed to use his acquaintance with Rashid al-Din Hamadani to get him a decree from the Ilkhan ruler Abu Sa'id Bahadur Khan to free his father. Another story states that Yusof Shah being envious of the popularity of Rukn ad-Din's Madrasa, accused him of murder of a Christian merchant to imprison him.

After being released, he spent the rest of his days teaching in the Madrasa he had made and was buried there after his death.

The complex included a Khanqah, a Madrasa, a mausoleum, a library, an observatory and a mill of which only the mausoleum survives. The mausoleum is currently under repair.

It was listed in the national heritage sites of Iran with the number 246 on 17 December 1935.

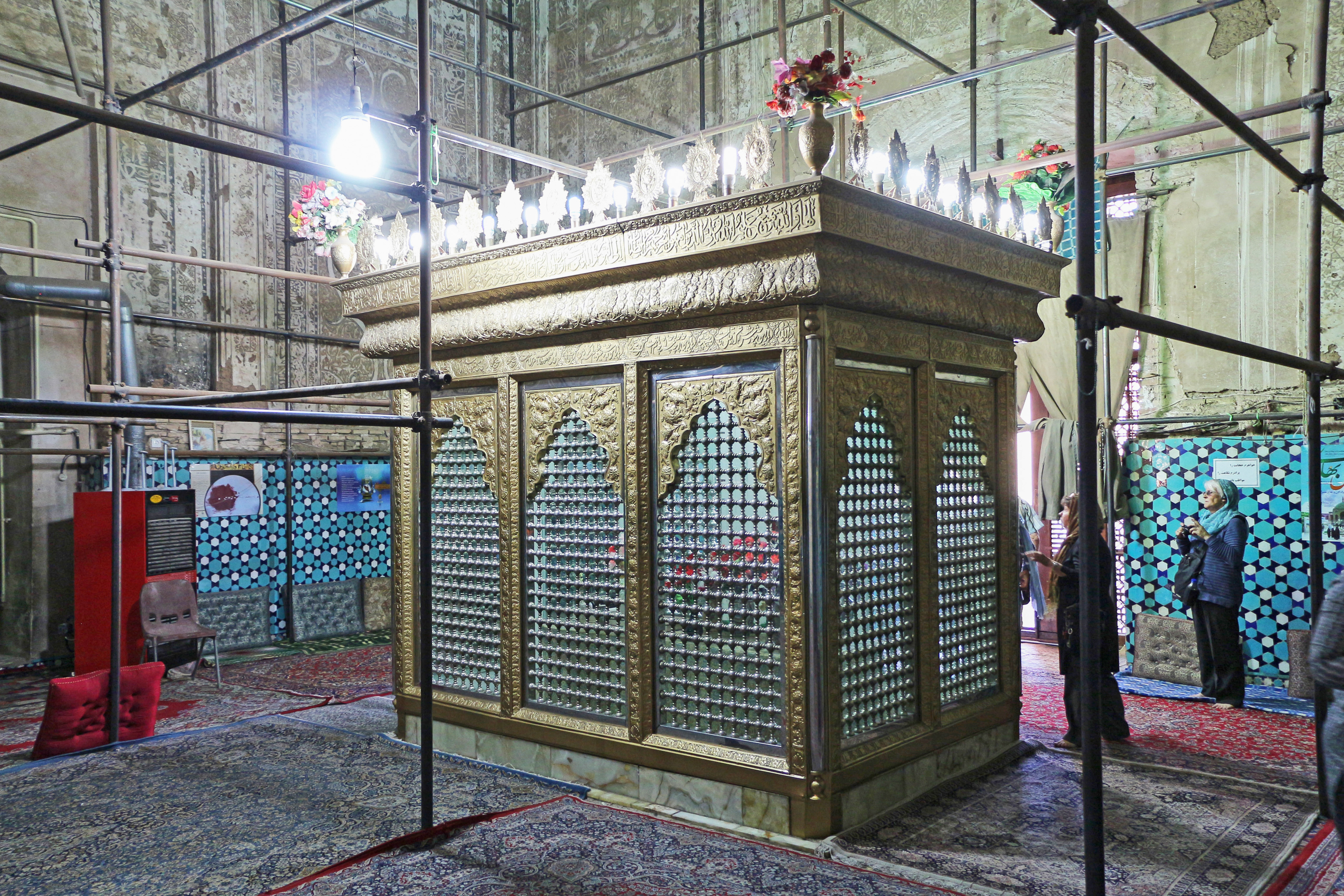

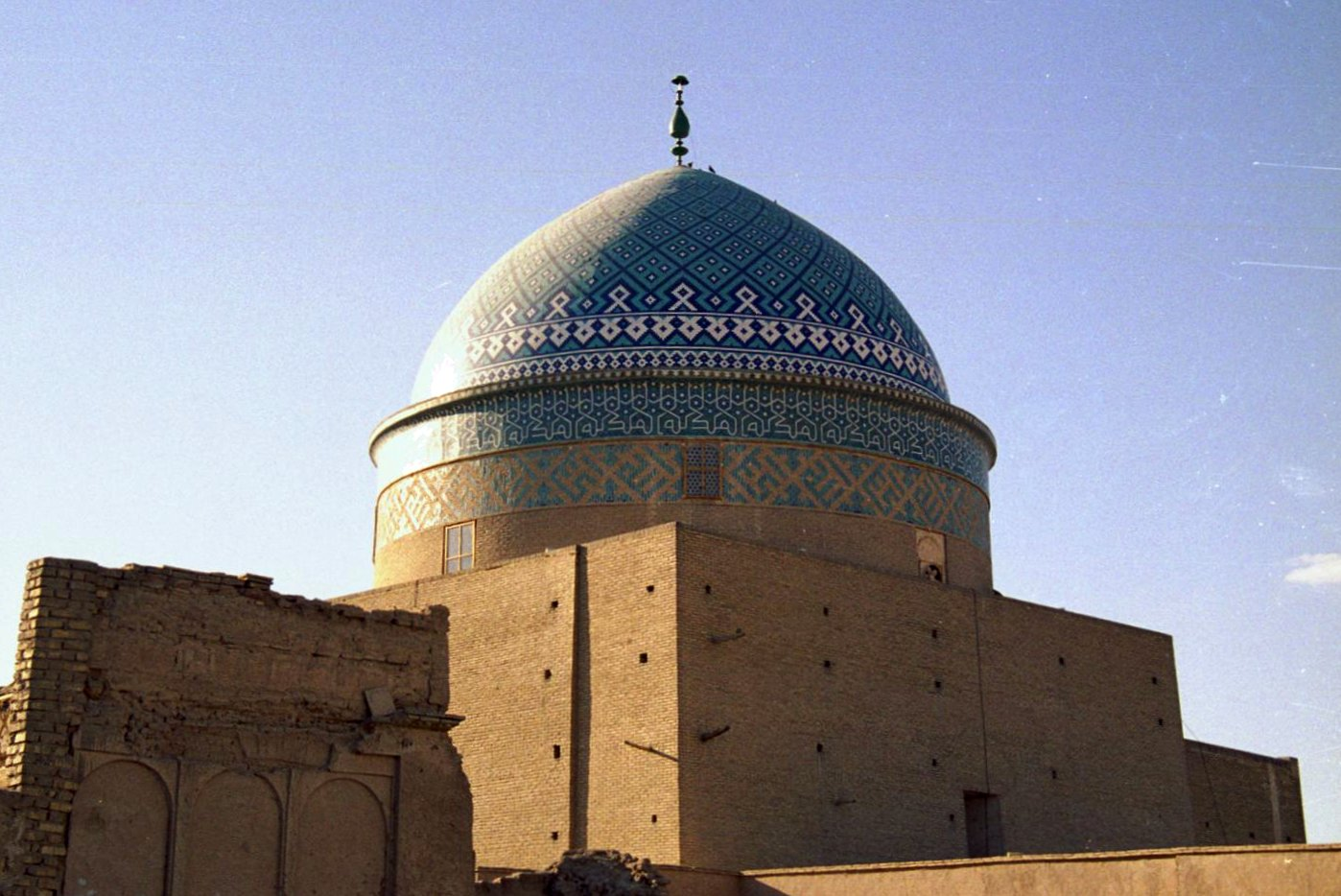

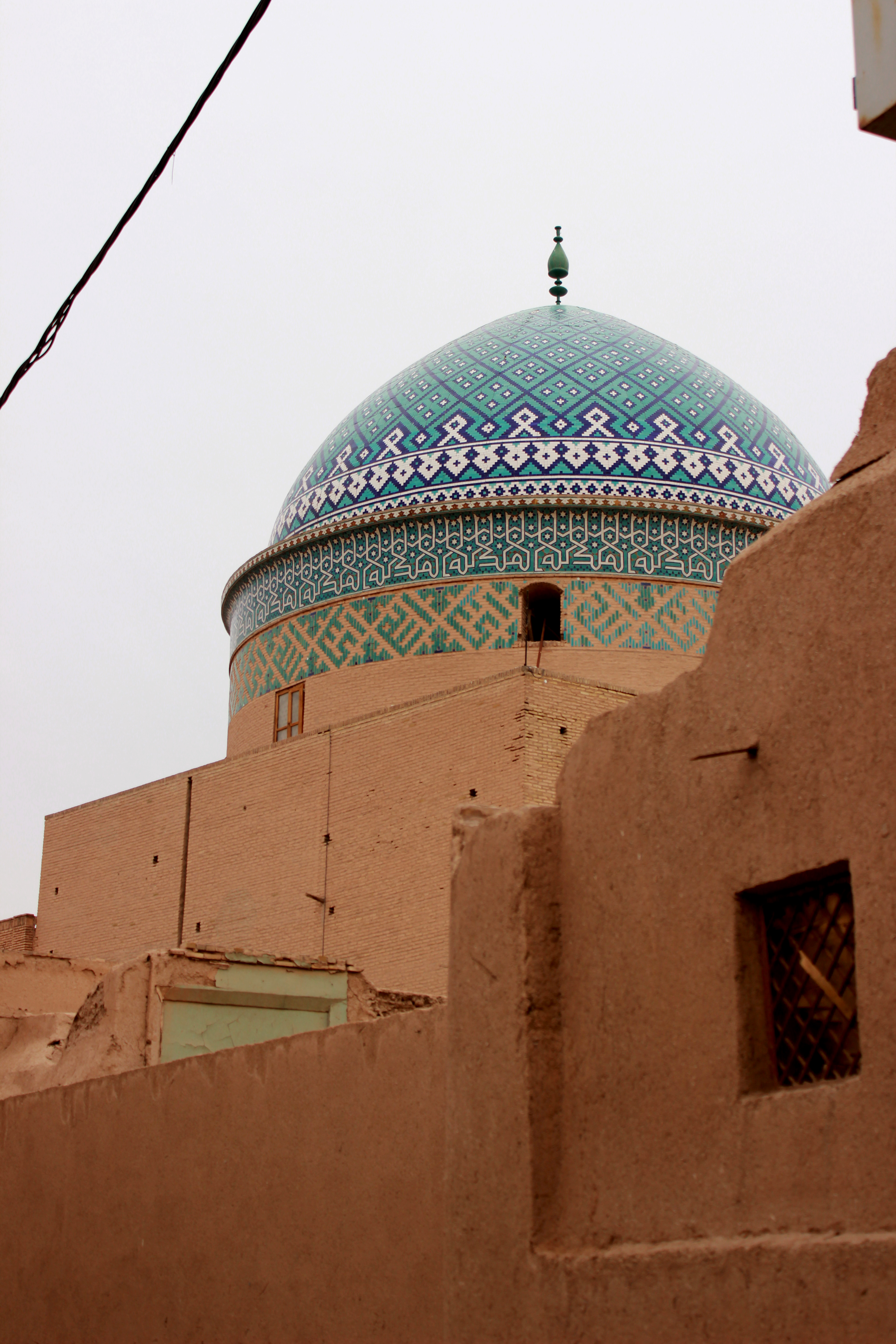

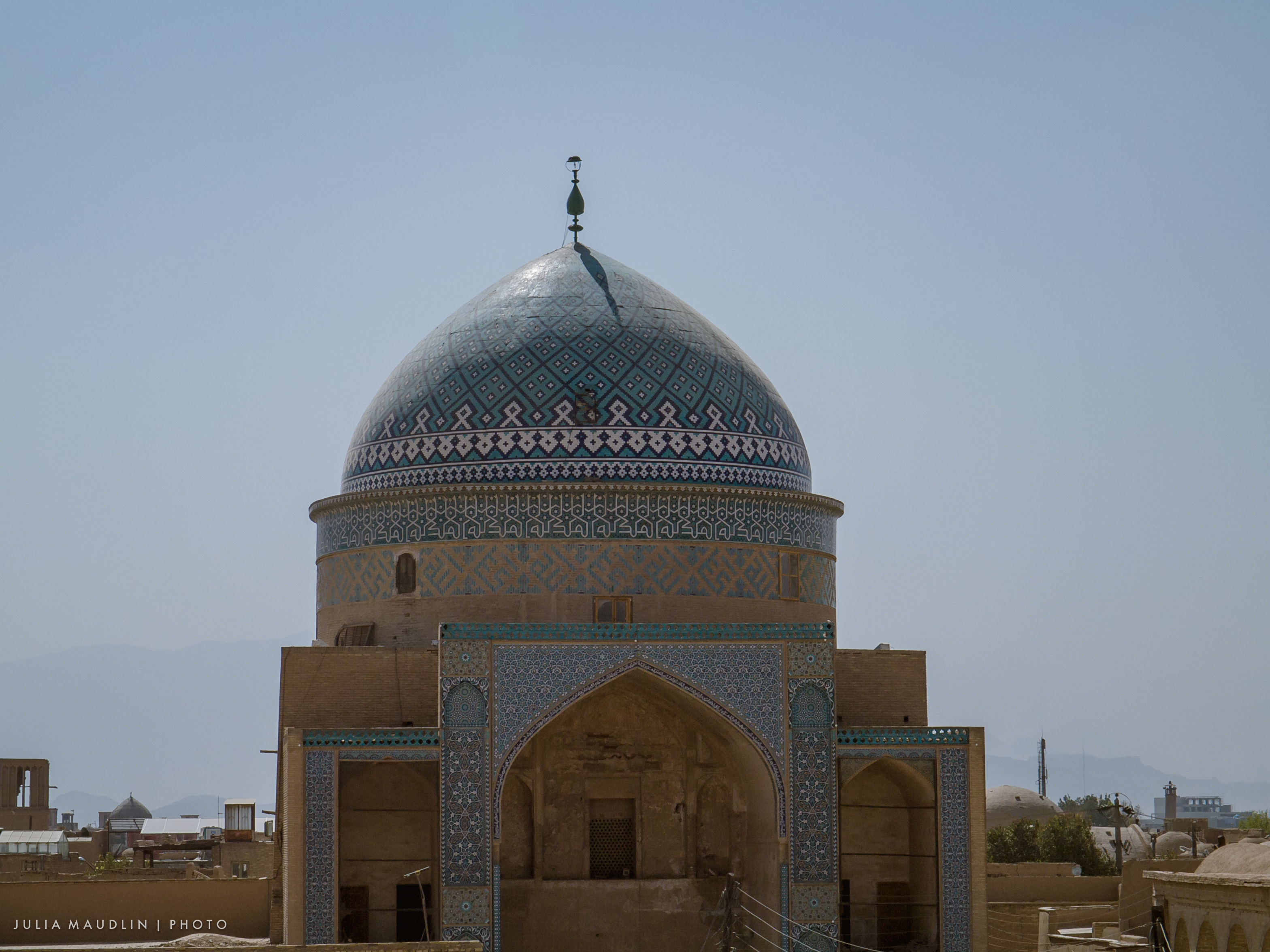

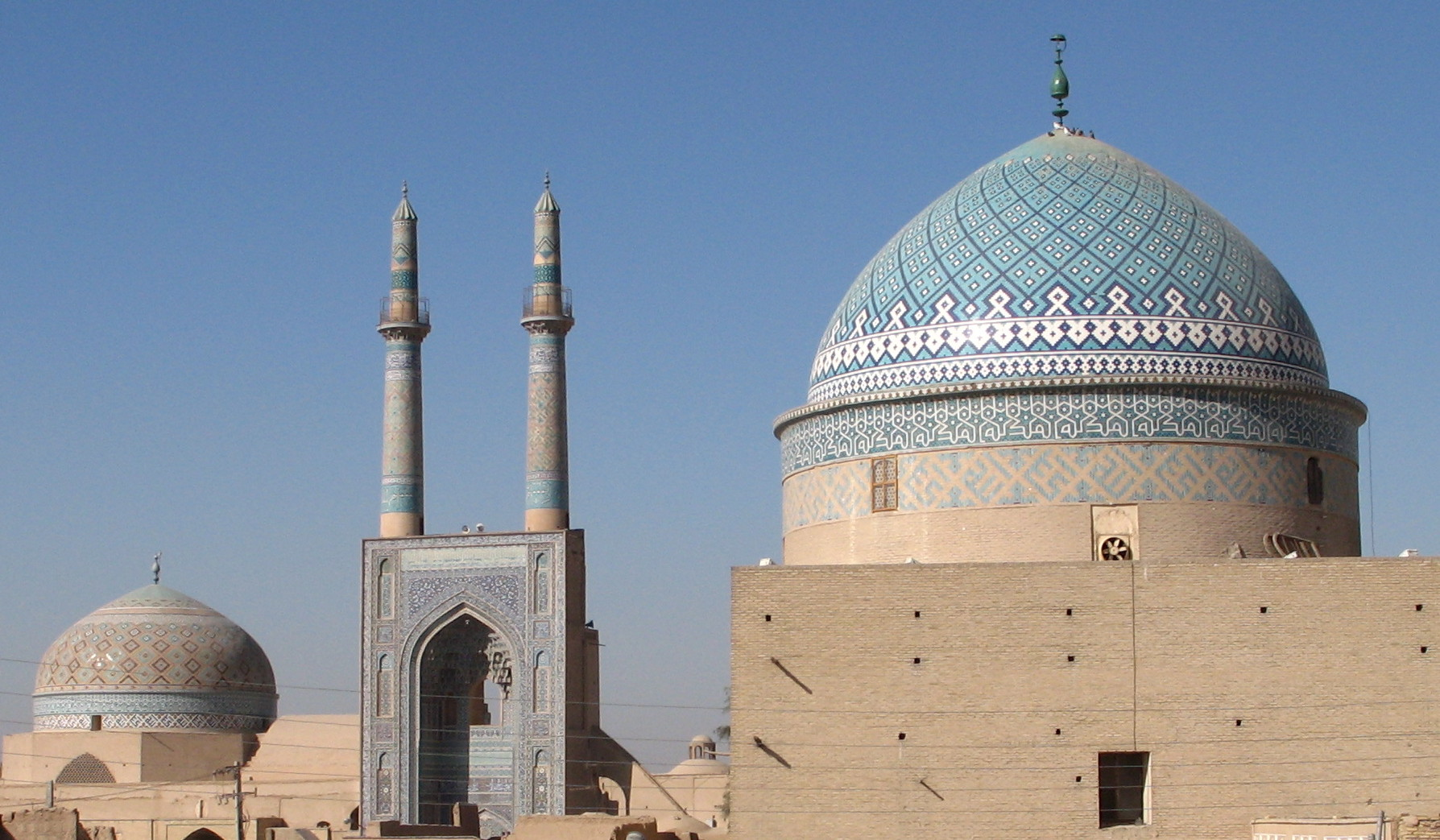

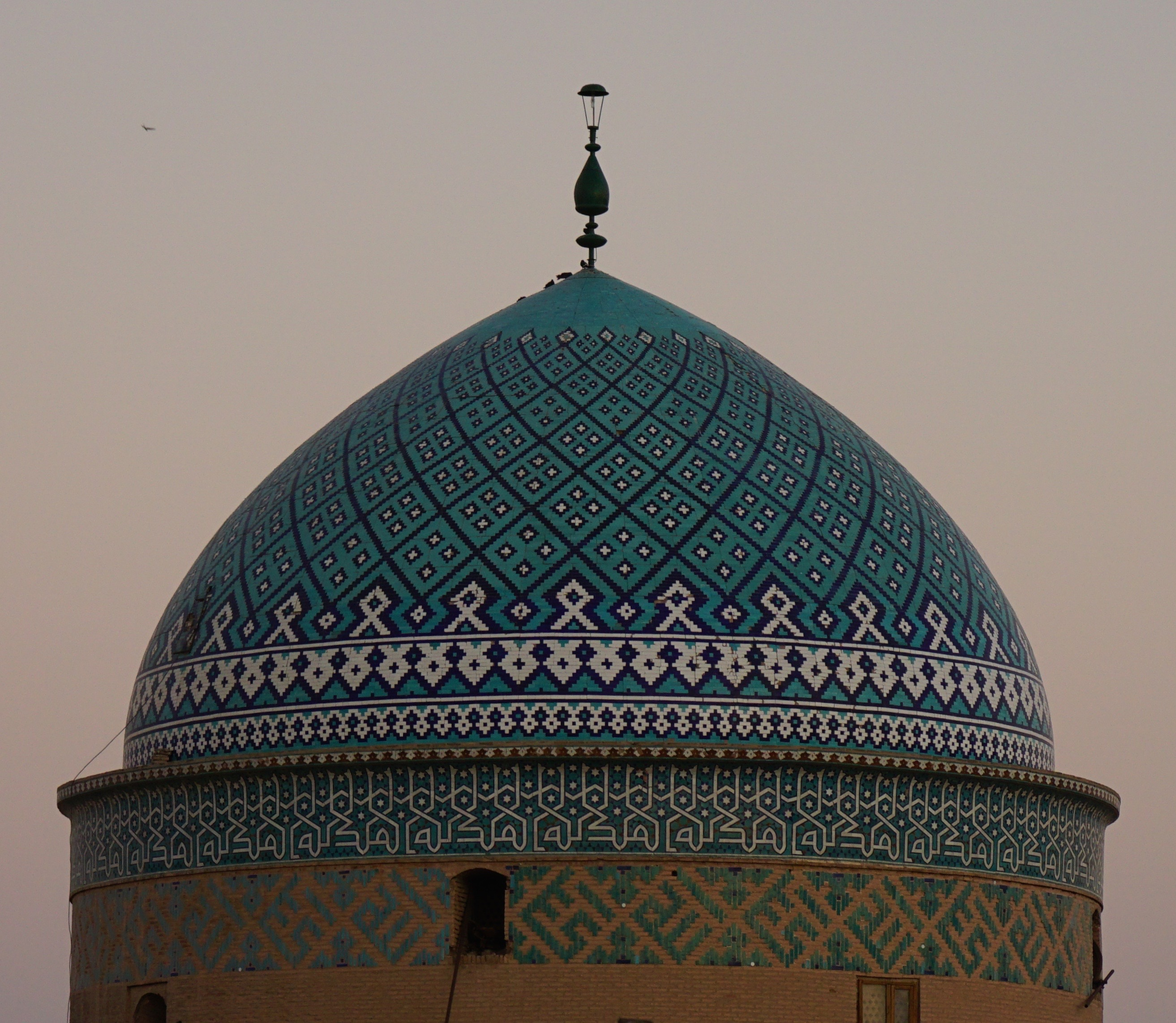

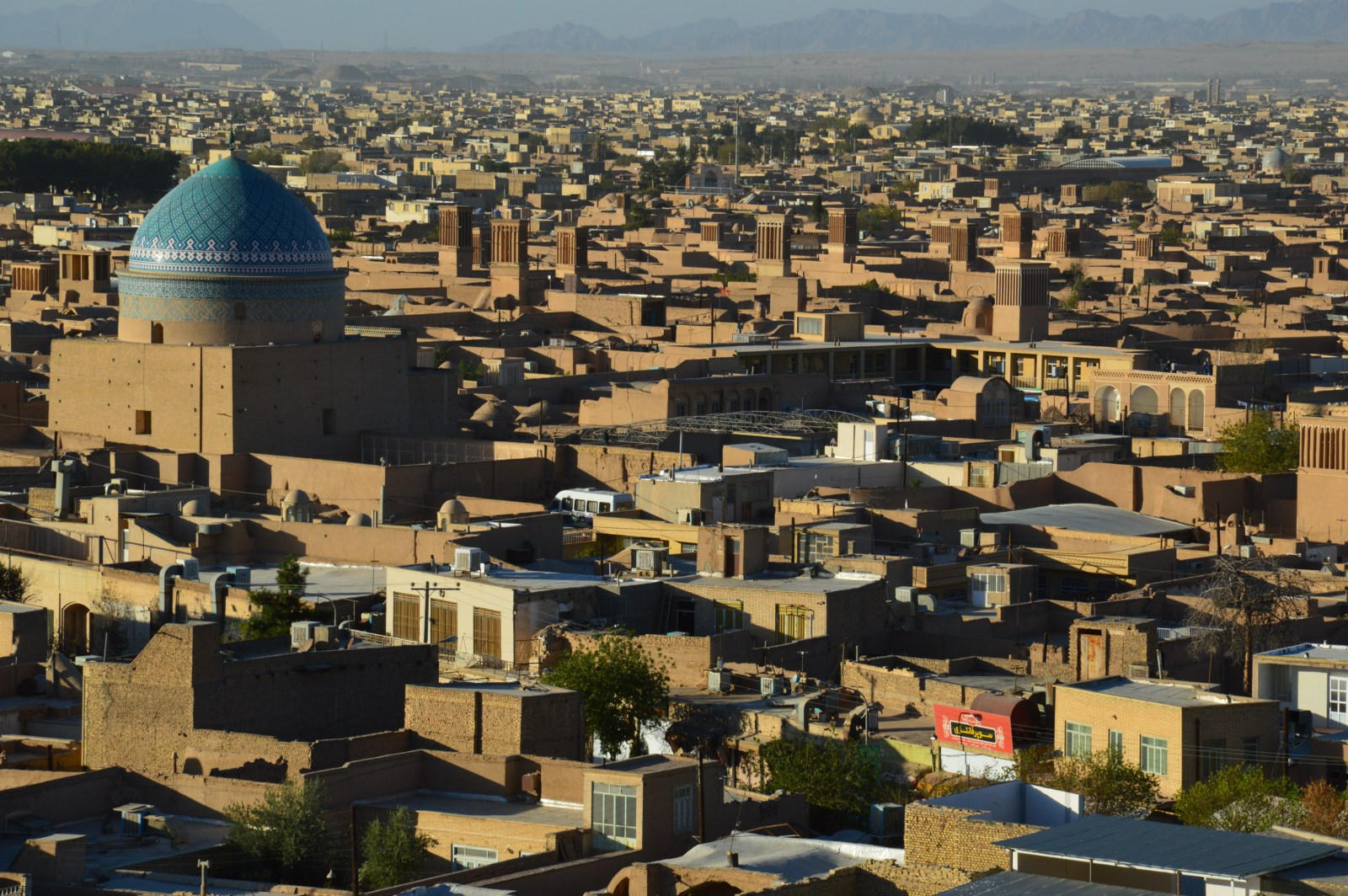

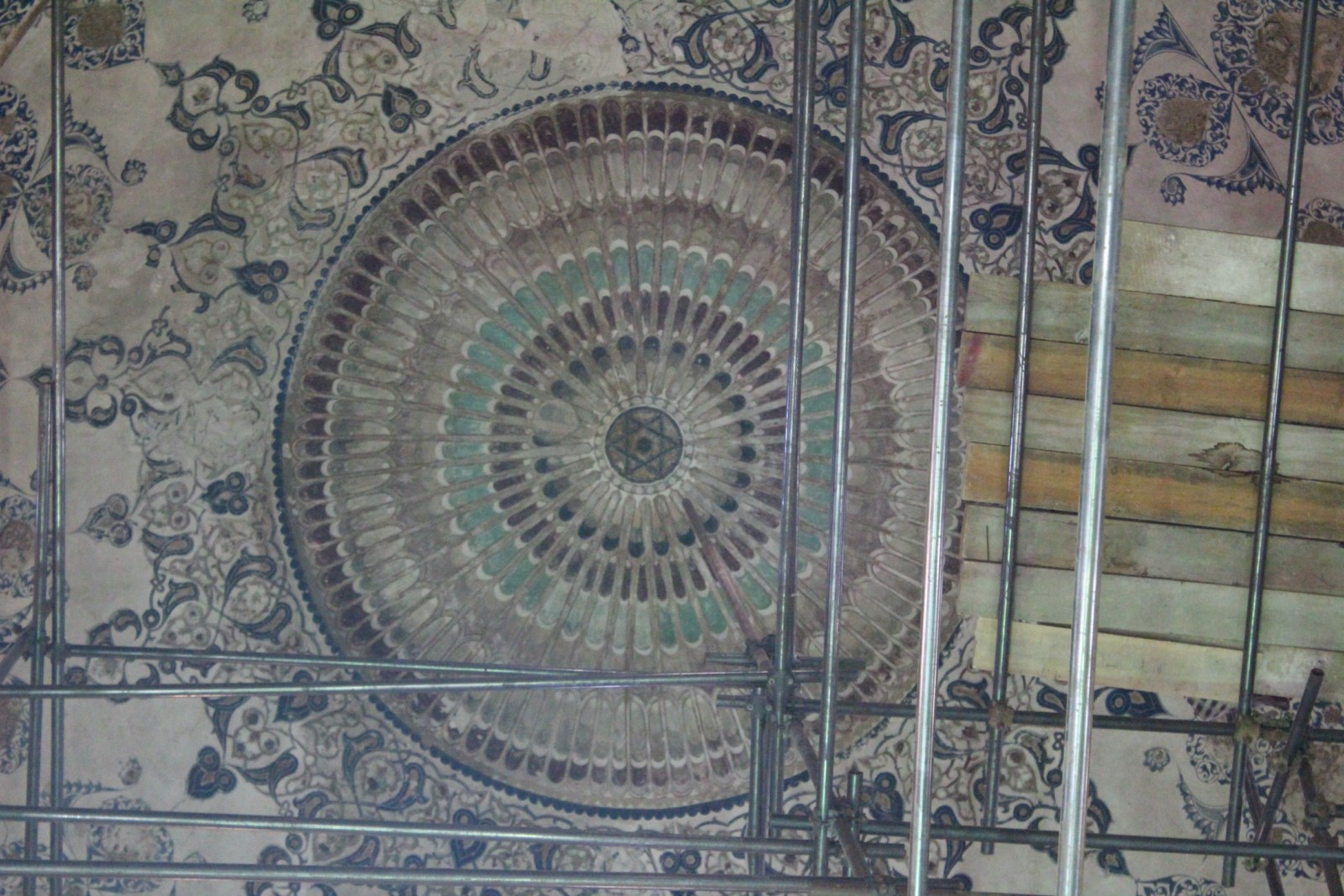
