= Kashkevar =

Kashkevar (Persian: كشكور) may refer to:

- Kashkevar, Markazi
- Kashkevar, Qazvin
