= Kalleh Dasht =

Kalleh Dasht (Persian: كله دشت) may refer to:

- Kalleh Dasht, Gilan
- Kalleh Dasht, Markazi
