= Kallik =

Kallik or Kalik or Kolik (Persian: كليك) may refer to:

- Kallik, Hamadan
- Kalik, Kermanshah
- Kalik, Nowshahr, Mazandaran Province
- Kolik, Nur, Mazandaran Province
- Kallik, Sistan and Baluchestan
- Kalik, West Azerbaijan
- Kolik, West Azerbaijan

== See also ==
- Kalik
- Karlik (disambiguation)
