= Kerik =

Kerik may refer to:

- Bernard Kerik, former police commissioner of New York City
- Kerik, North Khorasan, a village in Iran

== See also ==
- Karik (disambiguation)
