= Sari-ye Sofla =

Neighborhood in Markazi province, Iran

Sari-ye Sofla Persian: ساري سفلي
- Neighborhood
- Location within Iran
- Coordinates: 35°13′34″N 49°31′57″E
- Country: Iran
- Province: Markazi
- County: Saveh
- District: Nowbaran
- Rural District: Kuhpayeh
- Village: Khaneqah

Population (2006)
  - Total: 55
- Time zone: UTC+3:30 (IRST)

Sari-ye Sofla (Persian: ساري سفلي) (Note: Also romanized as Sārī Soflá and Sārī-ye Soflá) is a neighborhood in the village of Khaneqah in Kuhpayeh Rural District of Nowbaran District in Saveh County, Markazi province, Iran.

== Demographics ==
=== Population ===
At the time of the 2006 National Census, Sari-ye Sofla's population was 55 in 19 households, when it was a village in Kuhpayeh Rural District.

In 2010, Sari-ye Sofla merged with the village of Khaneqah.
