= Qarloq =

Qarloq or Qarleq (Persian: قارلق) may refer to:

- Qarleq, Kermanshah
- Qarloq, Markazi
- Qarloq, North Khorasan
- Qarloq, Zanjan
- Qarloq, Abhar, Zanjan Province

== See also ==
- Karluk (disambiguation)
- Qarluq, Iran (disambiguation)
