= Kord Khvord =

Kord Khvord or Kard Khowrd or Kord Khurd or Kard Khurd or Kard Khvord (Persian: كردخورد) may refer to:

- Kord Khvord-e Olya
- Kord Khvord-e Sofla
