= Zow =

Zow (Persian: زو) may refer to:

- Andrew Zow, American football player
- Zu, North Khorasan, a village in North Khorasan Province, Iran
- Zu-ye Olya, a village in North Khorasan Province, Iran
- Zu-ye Sofla (disambiguation)
- Zaav, a legendary king of Iran

== See also ==
- ZOW
