= Kord Khvord-e Sofla =

Kord Khvord-e Sofla كردخوردسفلي
- Village
- Location within Iran
- Coordinates: 35°10′38″N 49°43′54″E
- Country: Iran
- Province: Markazi
- County: Saveh
- Bakhsh: Nowbaran
- Rural District: Bayat

Population (2006)
  - Total: 78
- Time zone: UTC+3:30 (IRST)
  - Summer (DST): UTC+4:30 (IRDT)

Kord Khvord-e Sofla (Persian: كردخوردسفلي, also Romanized as Kord Khvord-e Soflá and Kard Khowrd Soflá; also known as Kard Khūrd, Kard Khvord, Kord Khord Sofla, Kord Khūrd-e Pā’īn, and Kord Khvord-e Pā’īn) is a village in Bayat Rural District, Nowbaran District, Saveh County, Markazi Province, Iran. At the 2006 census, its population was 78, in 19 families.
