= Jalakbar =

Village in Markazi province, Iran

Jalakbar Persian: جل اكبر
- Village
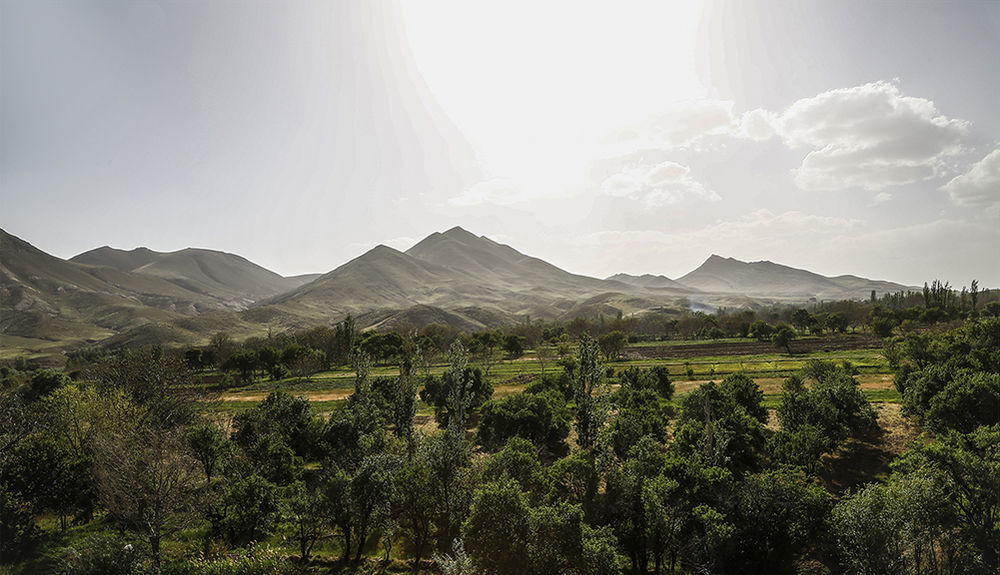
- The village if Jalakbar in 2017

- Location within Iran
- Coordinates: 35°10′47″N 49°36′28″E
- Country: Iran
- Province: Markazi
- County: Saveh
- District: Nowbaran
- Rural District: Kuhpayeh

Population (2016)
  - Total: 214
- Time zone: UTC+3:30 (IRST)

Jalakbar (Persian: جل اكبر) (Note: Also romanized as Jalākbar; also known as Chalageh, Chalakbar, Jalagbar, Jalakbarī, and Jalaqeh) is a village in Kuhpayeh Rural District of Nowbaran District in Saveh County, Markazi province, Iran.

== Demographics ==
=== Population ===
At the time of the 2006 National Census, the village's population was 155 in 76 households. The following census in 2011 counted 168 people in 91 households. The 2016 census measured the population of the village as 214 people in 97 households.
