= Chakhmaqlu =

Chakhmaqlu or Chakhmaghlu (Persian: چخماقلو) may refer to:

- Chakhmaqlu, Ardabil
- Chakhmaqlu, North Khorasan
- Chakhmaqlu-ye Sofla, West Azerbaijan Province
