= Kord Khvord-e Olya =

Kord Khvord-e Olya كردخوردعليا
- Village
- Location within Iran
- Coordinates: 35°10′31″N 49°43′22″E
- Country: Iran
- Province: Markazi
- County: Saveh
- Bakhsh: Nowbaran
- Rural District: Bayat

Population (2006)
  - Total: 59
- Time zone: UTC+3:30 (IRST)
  - Summer (DST): UTC+4:30 (IRDT)

Kord Khvord-e Olya (Persian: كردخوردعليا, also Romanized as Kord Khvord-e ‘Olyā and Kard Khowrd ‘Olyā; also known as Kord Khūrd-e Bālā and Kord Khvord-e Bālā) is a village in Bayat Rural District, Nowbaran District, Saveh County, Markazi Province, Iran. At the 2006 census, its population was 59, in 25 families.
