= Molla Hasani =

Molla Hasani (Persian: ملاحسني) may refer to:

- Molla Hasani, Hormozgan

== See also ==
- Molla Hasan (disambiguation)
