= Kalleh Dasht, Markazi =

Kalleh Dasht كله دشت
- Village
- Location within Iran
- Coordinates: 35°04′11″N 49°51′28″E
- Country: Iran
- Province: Markazi
- County: Saveh
- Bakhsh: Nowbaran
- Rural District: Aq Kahriz

Population (2006)
  - Total: 196
- Time zone: UTC+3:30 (IRST)
  - Summer (DST): UTC+4:30 (IRDT)

Kalleh Dasht (Persian: كله دشت) is a village in Aq Kahriz Rural District, Nowbaran District, Saveh County, Markazi Province, Iran. At the 2006 census, its population was 196, in 79 families.
