= Saman, Markazi =

Village in Markazi province, Iran

Saman Persian: سامان
- Village
- Location within Iran
- Coordinates: 35°15′31″N 49°34′36″E
- Country: Iran
- Province: Markazi
- County: Saveh
- District: Nowbaran
- Rural District: Kuhpayeh

Population (2016)
  - Total: 611
- Time zone: UTC+3:30 (IRST)

Saman (Persian: سامان) (Note: Also romanized as Sāmān; also known as Sāmān Qal‘eh-ye Pā’īn) is a village in Kuhpayeh Rural District of Nowbaran District in Saveh County, Markazi province, Iran.

The 14th-century author Hamdallah Mustawfi described Saman as "a large village in the district of the Two Kharraqans," lying on a stream that flowed down from a mountain also called Saman before joining the Muzdaqan stream and flowing towards Saveh. The crops grown at Saman, Mustawfi reported, were grain, grapes, and "some little fruit".

== Demographics ==
=== Population ===
At the time of the 2006 National Census, the village's population was 378 in 166 households. The following census in 2011 counted 373 people in 171 households. The 2016 census measured the population of the village as 611 people in 238 households.
