= Setaq =

Village in Markazi province, Iran

Setaq Persian: ستق
- Village
- Location within Iran
- Coordinates: 35°02′52″N 49°17′40″E
- Country: Iran
- Province: Markazi
- County: Saveh
- District: Nowbaran
- Rural District: Bayat

Population (2016)
  - Total: 1,046
- Time zone: UTC+3:30 (IRST)

Setaq (Persian: ستق) (Note: Also romanized as Sataq; also known as Satagh, Sī Taq, and Sītāb) is a village in Bayat Rural District of Nowbaran District in Saveh County, Markazi province, Iran.

== Demographics ==
=== Population ===
At the time of the 2006 National Census, the village's population was 1,488 in 314 households. The following census in 2011 counted 972 people in 285 households. The 2016 census measured the population of the village as 1,046 people in 304 households, the most populous in its rural district.
