= Qermezin =

Village in Markazi province, Iran

Qermezin Persian: قرمزين
- Village
- Location within Iran
- Coordinates: 35°15′38″N 49°37′20″E
- Country: Iran
- Province: Markazi
- County: Saveh
- District: Nowbaran
- Rural District: Kuhpayeh

Population (2016)
  - Total: 230
- Time zone: UTC+3:30 (IRST)

Qermezin (Persian: قرمزين) (Note: Also romanized as Qermezīn; also known as Qermezī and Qīrramzīn) is a village in Kuhpayeh Rural District of Nowbaran District in Saveh County, Markazi province, Iran.

== Demographics ==
=== Population ===
At the time of the 2006 National Census, the village's population was 184 in 82 households. The following census in 2011 counted 201 people in 99 households. The 2016 census measured the population of the village as 230 people in 129 households.
