= Qaleh-ye Teyn =

Village in Markazi province, Iran

Qaleh-ye Teyn Persian: قلعه تين
- Village
- Location within Iran
- Coordinates: 35°07′33″N 49°40′33″E
- Country: Iran
- Province: Markazi
- County: Saveh
- District: Nowbaran
- Rural District: Bayat

Population (2016)
  - Total: 259
- Time zone: UTC+3:30 (IRST)

Qaleh-ye Teyn (Persian: قلعه تين) (Note: Also romanized as Qal‘eh-ye Teyn; also known as Qalateyn) is a village in Bayat Rural District of Nowbaran District in Saveh County, Markazi province, Iran.

== Demographics ==
=== Population ===
At the time of the 2006 National Census, the village's population was 99 in 40 households. The following census in 2011 counted 173 people in 76 households. The 2016 census measured the population of the village as 259 people in 101 households.
