= Chamran, Markazi =

Village in Markazi province, Iran

Chamran Persian: چمران
- Village
- Location within Iran
- Coordinates: 35°10′44″N 49°55′39″E
- Country: Iran
- Province: Markazi
- County: Saveh
- District: Nowbaran
- Rural District: Aq Kahriz

Population (2016)
  - Total: 467
- Time zone: UTC+3:30 (IRST)

Chamran (Persian: چمران) (Note: Also romanized as Chamrān; also known as Chamarom, Chamarūm, Chamram, and Chatram) is a village in Aq Kahriz Rural District of Nowbaran District in Saveh County, Markazi province, Iran.

== Demographics ==
=== Population ===
At the time of the 2006 National Census, the village's population was 441 in 124 households. The following census in 2011 counted 373 people in 121 households. The 2016 census measured the population of the village as 467 people in 183 households.
