= Jushqan, Markazi =

Village in Markazi province, Iran

Jushqan Persian: جوشقان
- Village
- Location within Iran
- Coordinates: 35°10′07″N 49°38′39″E
- Country: Iran
- Province: Markazi
- County: Saveh
- District: Nowbaran
- Rural District: Kuhpayeh

Population (2016)
  - Total: 502
- Time zone: UTC+3:30 (IRST)

Jushqan (Persian: جوشقان) (Note: Also romanized as Jowshaqan, Jowsheqān, and Jūshqān; also known as Jowsheghan) is a village in Kuhpayeh Rural District of Nowbaran District in Saveh County, Markazi province, Iran.

== Demographics ==
=== Population ===
At the time of the 2006 National Census, the village's population was 366 in 142 households. The following census in 2011 counted 321 people in 123 households. The 2016 census measured the population of the village as 502 people in 204 households.
