= Damurchi =

Village in Markazi province, Iran

Damurchi Persian: دمورچي
- Village
- Location within Iran
- Coordinates: 35°09′58″N 49°39′46″E
- Country: Iran
- Province: Markazi
- County: Saveh
- District: Nowbaran
- Rural District: Bayat

Population (2016)
  - Total: 402
- Time zone: UTC+3:30 (IRST)

Damurchi (Persian: دمورچي) (Note: Also romanized as Damūrchī; also known as Damīrchī) is a village in Bayat Rural District of Nowbaran District in Saveh County, Markazi province, Iran.

== Demographics ==
=== Population ===
At the time of the 2006 National Census, the village's population was 128 in 51 households. The following census in 2011 counted 335 people in 125 households. The 2016 census measured the population of the village as 402 people in 168 households.
