= Meymah =

Maymah or Meymeh (Persian: ميمه) may refer to:

- Meymeh, a city in Isfahan Province
- Meymeh District, in Isfahan Province
- Meymeh, Ilam
- Meymah, Markazi
