= Mar, Markazi =

Village in Markazi province, Iran

Mar Persian: مر
- Village
- Location within Iran
- Coordinates: 35°05′24″N 49°48′23″E
- Country: Iran
- Province: Markazi
- County: Saveh
- District: Nowbaran
- Rural District: Aq Kahriz

Population (2016)
  - Total: 186
- Time zone: UTC+3:30 (IRST)

Mar (Persian: مر) is a village in Aq Kahriz Rural District of Nowbaran District in Saveh County, Markazi province, Iran.

== Demographics ==
=== Population ===
At the time of the 2006 National Census, the village's population was 139 in 51 households. The following census in 2011 counted 47 people in 20 households. The 2016 census measured the population of the village as 186 people in 72 households.
