= Khaneqah, Markazi =

Village in Markazi province, Iran

Khaneqah Persian: خانقاه
- Village
- Location within Iran
- Coordinates: 35°13′46″N 49°31′52″E
- Country: Iran
- Province: Markazi
- County: Saveh
- District: Nowbaran
- Rural District: Kuhpayeh

Population (2016)
  - Total: 235
- Time zone: UTC+3:30 (IRST)

Khaneqah (Persian: خانقاه) (Note: Also romanized as Khāneqāh and Khānqāh) is a village in Kuhpayeh Rural District of Nowbaran District in Saveh County, Markazi province, Iran.

== Demographics ==
=== Population ===
At the time of the 2006 National Census, the village's population was 215 in 84 households. The following census in 2011 counted 396 people in 130 households, by which time the village of Sari-ye Sofla had merged with Khaneqah. The 2016 census measured the population of the village as 235 people in 78 households.
