= Ghazemabad, Nowbaran =

Village in Markazi province, Iran

Ghazemabad Persian: غازم اباد
- Village
- Location within Iran
- Coordinates: 35°00′41″N 49°50′05″E
- Country: Iran
- Province: Markazi
- County: Saveh
- District: Nowbaran
- Rural District: Aq Kahriz

Population (2016)
  - Total: 178
- Time zone: UTC+3:30 (IRST)

Ghazemabad (Persian: غازم اباد) (Note: Also romanized as Ghāzemābād; also known as ‘Āzemābād, Kāz̧emābād, and Kāzimābād) is a village in Aq Kahriz Rural District of Nowbaran District in Saveh County, Markazi province, Iran.

== Demographics ==
=== Population ===
At the time of the 2006 National Census, the village's population was 354 in 112 households. The following census in 2011 counted 252 people in 93 households. The 2016 census measured the population of the village as 178 people in 84 households.
