= Molla Hasan =

Molla Hasan (Persian: ملاحسن) may refer to:

- Molla Hasan, North Khorasan
- Molla Hasan, West Azerbaijan

== See also ==
- Molla Hasani (disambiguation)
