= Karlik =

Karlik may refer to the following:

== People ==
- Karlik (name)

== Places ==
- Karlík, Czech Republic
- Karlık, Şuhut, Afyonkarahisar Province, Turkey
- Karlık, Yüreğir, Adana Province, Turkey
- Karlık, Taşova, Amasya Province, Turkey

== See also ==
- Karlikh, Iran
- Kallik (disambiguation)
- Karik (disambiguation)
- Karluk (disambiguation)
- Karnik (disambiguation)
- Kartik (disambiguation)
- Little Longnose (Russian: Ка́рлик Нос, Karlik Nos), a 2003 Russian animated film
