= Kashkevar, Markazi =

Kashkevar كشكور
- Village
- Location within Iran
- Coordinates: 35°13′43″N 49°59′14″E
- Country: Iran
- Province: Markazi
- County: Saveh
- Bakhsh: Nowbaran
- Rural District: Aq Kahriz

Population (2006)
  - Total: 17
- Time zone: UTC+3:30 (IRST)
  - Summer (DST): UTC+4:30 (IRDT)

Kashkevar (Persian: كشكور; also known as Koshkbar and Kūshkehbar) is a village in Aq Kahriz Rural District, Nowbaran District, Saveh County, Markazi Province, Iran. At the 2006 census, its population was 17, in 4 families.
