= Qarluq, Iran =

Qarluq (Persian: قارلوق), in Iran, may refer to:

- Qarloq, Markazi
- Qarluq, Zanjan
- Qarluq, Abhar, Zanjan Province

== See also ==
- Qarloq (disambiguation)
- Karluk (disambiguation)
