= Meymah, Markazi =

Meymah ميمه
- Village
- Location within Iran
- Coordinates: 35°11′02″N 49°41′22″E
- Country: Iran
- Province: Markazi
- County: Saveh
- Bakhsh: Nowbaran
- Rural District: Bayat

Population (2006)
  - Total: 58
- Time zone: UTC+3:30 (IRST)
  - Summer (DST): UTC+4:30 (IRDT)

Meymah (Persian: ميمه) is a village in Bayat Rural District, Nowbaran District, Saveh County, Markazi Province, Iran. At the 2006 census, its population was 58, in 28 families.
