= Koreh Bar =

Village in Markazi province, Iran

Koreh Bar Persian: كره بر
- Village
- Location within Iran
- Coordinates: 35°14′34″N 49°30′13″E
- Country: Iran
- Province: Markazi
- County: Saveh
- District: Nowbaran
- Rural District: Kuhpayeh

Population (2016)
  - Total: 360
- Time zone: UTC+3:30 (IRST)

Koreh Bar (Persian: كره بر) (Note: Also known as Kordeh Bar) is a village in Kuhpayeh Rural District of Nowbaran District in Saveh County, Markazi province, Iran.

== Demographics ==
=== Population ===
At the time of the 2006 National Census, the village's population was 217 in 87 households. The following census in 2011 counted 354 people in 123 households. The 2016 census measured the population of the village as 360 people in 122 households.
