= Telimxan =

Iranian Azerbaijani poet (1742–1829)

Telim Xan
- Born: 1742; Saveh, Iran
- Died: 1829 (aged 86–87); Saveh, Iran
- Occupation: Iranian Poet

Telim Xan or Tilim Khan (Persian: حكيم تليم خان) (1742 – 1829), was an Iranian Azerbaijani poet, who wrote in Azerbaijani and Persian. His most important work, Telimxan Divani, has been printed several times.

== Biography ==
He was born in Maraghey village in west of Saveh township and buried in the same village. However he had several travels across the country, especially Shiraz, since he may have been of Qashqai descendant. He is known for his poetry (Divan) and his memorial ceremonies are held annually.

== Poems ==
His poems reflect social structure of his time and are a considered a source for investigating Iran in Qajar dynasty era and their attitudes. His poems had been translated in Turkish, Persian and Azeri.

A sample poem:

Tilim deyir bəyənmişəm əzəldən
əl götürməm Mehri kimin güzəldən
necə dözüm,
yarım gedibdir əldən

Translation:

Tilimxan says since ever I have preferred
I shall never lose the beauty, as Mehri was
I have been waiting for long
but my beloved has left me alone
