= Karnik =

Karnik or Karnick is an Indian surname. It is mainly found among the members of the Maharashtrian Chandraseniya Kayastha Prabhu (CKP) community. The Karnik are one of 42 families which compose the CKP community. The Karniks' gotra is Bharghav, their god is Surya, and their progenitor was named Karnik.

People with the name Karnik:

- Vijay Karnik, Indian Armed forces
- Kiran Karnik, Indian administration
- Samir Karnik, Indian film director, producer and screenwriter
- Siddhant Karnick, Indian actor
- Gauri Karnik, Indian actress
- Madhu Mangesh Karnik, Indian literary activist
- Ganesh Karnik, Indian politician and Member of Legislative Council at Karnataka Legislative Council
- Sadashiva S. Karnik, professor of molecular medicine at Case Western Reserve University
- Supriya Karnik, Indian actress in Take It Easy and other films
- Capt. Ramkrishna Gangadhar Karnik MBE, Indian Merchant Navy circa 1942 Mumbai-Singapore. For Valiant Ship Escapade was awarded MBE

== See also ==
- Karlik (disambiguation)
- 17273 Karnik, a main-belt asteroid named after Ryna Karnik, the 2003 Intel International Science and Engineering Fair winner
- Medvedev–Sponheuer–Karnik scale, named after Vít Kárník of Czechoslovakia
