= Dakhan =

Village in Markazi province, Iran

Dakhan Persian: دخان
- Village
- Location within Iran
- Coordinates: 35°07′28″N 49°31′02″E
- Country: Iran
- Province: Markazi
- County: Saveh
- District: Nowbaran
- Rural District: Bayat

Population (2016)
  - Total: 233
- Time zone: UTC+3:30 (IRST)

Dakhan (Persian: دخان) (Note: Also romanized as Dakhān and Dokhān; also known as Dow Khān, Dūkhān, and Dūqān) is a village in Bayat Rural District of Nowbaran District in Saveh County, Markazi province, Iran.

== Demographics ==
=== Population ===
At the time of the 2006 National Census, the village's population was 104 in 28 households. The following census in 2011 counted 139 people in 59 households. The 2016 census measured the population of the village as 233 people in 73 households.
