= Yatan =

Village in Markazi province, Iran

Yatan Persian: ياتان
- Village
- Location within Iran
- Coordinates: 35°12′46″N 49°33′21″E
- Country: Iran
- Province: Markazi
- County: Saveh
- District: Nowbaran
- Rural District: Kuhpayeh

Population (2016)
  - Total: 993
- Time zone: UTC+3:30 (IRST)

Yatan (Persian: ياتان) (Note: Also romanized as Yātān) is a village in, and the capital of, Kuhpayeh Rural District in Nowbaran District of Saveh County, Markazi province, Iran.

== Demographics ==
=== Population ===
At the time of the 2006 National Census, the village's population was 764 in 218 households. The following census in 2011 counted 1,048 people in 364 households. The 2016 census measured the population of the village as 993 people in 331 households, the most populous in its rural district.
