= Mazlaqan =

Village in Markazi province, Iran

Mazlaqan Persian: مزلقان
- Village
- Location within Iran
- Coordinates: 35°07′06″N 49°44′17″E
- Country: Iran
- Province: Markazi
- County: Saveh
- District: Nowbaran
- Rural District: Bayat

Population (2016)
  - Total: 330
- Time zone: UTC+3:30 (IRST)

Mazlaqan (Persian: مزلقان) (Note: Also romanized as Mazlaqān; also known as Marqakān, Mazdaqān, Mazdaqān Kohneh, Mazdaqān-e Kohneh, and Mazlaqān-e Kohneh) is a village in Bayat Rural District of Nowbaran District in Saveh County, Markazi province, Iran.

== Demographics ==
=== Population ===
At the time of the 2006 National Census, the village's population was 207 in 81 households. The following census in 2011 counted 270 people in 113 households. The 2016 census measured the population of the village as 330 people in 124 households.
