= Ali Darzi, Saveh =

Village in Markazi province, Iran

Ali Darzi Persian: علي درزي
- Village
- Location within Iran
- Coordinates: 35°07′28″N 49°52′24″E
- Country: Iran
- Province: Markazi
- County: Saveh
- District: Nowbaran
- Rural District: Aq Kahriz

Population (2016)
  - Total: 253
- Time zone: UTC+3:30 (IRST)

Ali Darzi (Persian: علي درزي) (Note: Also romanized as ‘Alī Darzī) is a village in Aq Kahriz Rural District of Nowbaran District in Saveh County, Markazi province, Iran.

== Demographics ==
=== Population ===
At the time of the 2006 National Census, the village's population was 88 in 23 households. The following census in 2011 counted 157 people in 67 households. The 2016 census measured the population of the village as 253 people in 87 households.
