= Kahak-e Sofla =

Village in Markazi province, Iran

Kahak-e Sofla Persian: کهک سفلي
- Village
- Location within Iran
- Coordinates: 35°05′01″N 49°48′45″E
- Country: Iran
- Province: Markazi
- County: Saveh
- District: Nowbaran
- Rural District: Aq Kahriz

Population (2016)
  - Total: 203
- Time zone: UTC+3:30 (IRST)

Kahak-e Sofla (Persian: کهک سفلي) (Note: Also romanized as Kahak-e Soflá; formerly known as Kahak (كهك); also known as Kahak-e Bālā) is a village in Aq Kahriz Rural District of Nowbaran District in Saveh County, Markazi province, Iran.

== Demographics ==
=== Population ===
At the time of the 2006 National Census, the village's population, as Kahak, was 288 in 104 households. The following census in 2011 counted 156 people in 65 households, by which time the village was listed as Kahak-e Sofla. The 2016 census measured the population of the village as 203 people in 92 households.
