= Bivaran =

Village in Markazi province, Iran

Bivaran Persian: بيوران
- Village
- Location within Iran
- Coordinates: 35°11′12″N 49°53′18″E
- Country: Iran
- Province: Markazi
- County: Saveh
- District: Nowbaran
- Rural District: Aq Kahriz

Population (2016)
  - Total: 304
- Time zone: UTC+3:30 (IRST)

Bivaran (Persian: بيوران) (Note: Also romanized as Bīvarān and Bīwarān; also known as Bayooran) is a village in Aq Kahriz Rural District of Nowbaran District in Saveh County, Markazi province, Iran.

== Demographics ==
=== Population ===
At the time of the 2006 National Census, the village's population was 309 in 104 households. The following census in 2011 counted 326 people in 121 households. The 2016 census measured the population of the village as 304 people in 129 households.
