= Piman, Iran =

Village in Markazi province, Iran

Piman Persian: پيمان
- Village
- Location within Iran
- Coordinates: 35°05′56″N 49°47′11″E
- Country: Iran
- Province: Markazi
- County: Saveh
- District: Nowbaran
- Rural District: Aq Kahriz

Population (2016)
  - Total: 177
- Time zone: UTC+3:30 (IRST)

Piman (Persian: پيمان) (Note: Also romanized as Pīmān) is a village in, and the capital of, Aq Kahriz Rural District in Nowbaran District of Saveh County, Markazi province, Iran.

== Demographics ==
=== Population ===
At the time of the 2006 National Census, the village's population was 130 in 46 households. The following census in 2011 counted 154 people in 61 households. The 2016 census measured the population of the village as 177 people in 67 households.
