= Maqsudabad, Saveh =

Village in Markazi province, Iran

Maqsudabad Persian: مقصوداباد
- Village
- Location within Iran
- Coordinates: 35°14′34″N 49°30′10″E
- Country: Iran
- Province: Markazi
- County: Saveh
- District: Nowbaran
- Rural District: Kuhpayeh

Population (2016)
  - Total: 278
- Time zone: UTC+3:30 (IRST)

Maqsudabad (Persian: مقصوداباد) (Note: Also romanized as Maqşūdābād) is a village in Kuhpayeh Rural District of Nowbaran District in Saveh County, Markazi province, Iran.

== Demographics ==
=== Language ===
People in this village speak Turkish.

=== Population ===
At the time of the 2006 National Census, the village's population was 249 in 92 households. The following census in 2011 counted 283 people in 109 households. The 2016 census measured the population of the village as 278 people in 94 households.
