= Aqcheh Qaleh, Markazi =

Village in Markazi province, Iran

Aqcheh Qaleh Persian: اقچه قلعه
- Village
- Location within Iran
- Coordinates: 34°59′49″N 49°29′37″E
- Country: Iran
- Province: Markazi
- County: Saveh
- District: Nowbaran
- Rural District: Bayat

Population (2016)
  - Total: 580
- Time zone: UTC+3:30 (IRST)

Aqcheh Qaleh (Persian: اقچه قلعه) (Note: Also romanized as Āqcheh Qal‘eh; also known as Aghcheh Ghaleh, Aqjaqleh, and Āqjeh Qal‘eh) is a village in Bayat Rural District of Nowbaran District in Saveh County, Markazi province, Iran.

== Demographics ==
=== Population ===
At the time of the 2006 National Census, the village's population was 584 in 150 households. The following census in 2011 counted 563 people in 178 households. The 2016 census measured the population of the village as 580 people in 213 households.
