= Naderabad, North Khorasan =

Village in North Khorasan province, Iran

Naderabad Persian: نادراباد
- Village
- Location within Iran
- Coordinates: 37°33′09″N 56°56′35″E
- Country: Iran
- Province: North Khorasan
- County: Samalqan
- District: Central
- Rural District: Howmeh

Population (2016)
  - Total: 682
- Time zone: UTC+3:30 (IRST)

Naderabad (Persian: نادراباد) (Note: Also romanized as Nāderābād) is a village in Howmeh Rural District of the Central District in Samalqan County, (Note: Formerly Maneh and Samalqan County) North Khorasan province, Iran.

== Demographics ==
=== Population ===
At the time of the 2006 National Census, the village's population was 629 in 150 households. The following census in 2011 counted 740 people in 206 households. The 2016 census measured the population of the village as 682 people in 206 households.
