= Hasan Mast =

Village in North Khorasan province, Iran

Hasan Mast Persian: حسن مست
- Village
- Location within Iran
- Coordinates: 37°32′32″N 56°59′19″E
- Country: Iran
- Province: North Khorasan
- County: Samalqan
- District: Central
- Rural District: Howmeh

Population (2016)
  - Total: 42
- Time zone: UTC+3:30 (IRST)

Hasan Mast (Persian: حسن مست) (Note: Also romanized as Ḩasan Mast; also known as Ḩasanābād and Kalāteh-ye Ḩasan Mast) is a village in Howmeh Rural District of the Central District in Samalqan County, (Note: Formerly Maneh and Samalqan County) North Khorasan province, Iran.

== Demographics ==
=== Population ===
At the time of the 2006 National Census, the village's population was 110 in 28 households. The following census in 2011 counted 46 people in 11 households. The 2016 census measured the population of the village as 42 people in 12 households.
