= Mehmanak =

Village in North Khorasan province, Iran

Mehmanak Persian: مهمانك
- Village
- Location within Iran
- Coordinates: 37°30′35″N 56°52′05″E
- Country: Iran
- Province: North Khorasan
- County: Samalqan
- District: Central
- Rural District: Howmeh

Population (2016)
  - Total: 1,627
- Time zone: UTC+3:30 (IRST)

Mehmanak (Persian: مهمانك) (Note: Also romanized as Mehmānak) is a village in Howmeh Rural District of the Central District in Samalqan County, (Note: Formerly Maneh and Samalqan County) North Khorasan province, Iran.

== Demographics ==
=== Population ===
At the time of the 2006 National Census, the village's population was 1,762 in 474 households. The following census in 2011 counted 1,806 people in 558 households. The 2016 census measured the population of the village as 1,627 people in 528 households.
