= Gharqabad =

City in Markazi province, Iran

Gharqabad Persian: غرق آباد
- City
- Location within Iran
- Coordinates: 35°06′27″N 49°49′53″E
- Country: Iran
- Province: Markazi
- County: Saveh
- District: Nowbaran

Population (2016)
  - Total: 5,375
- Time zone: UTC+3:30 (IRST)

Gharqabad (Persian: غرق آباد) (Note: Also romanized as Gharqābād and Gharaqābād; also known as Ghargh Abad) is a city in Nowbaran District of Saveh County, Markazi province, Iran.

== Etymology ==
In antiquity, the city was named "Karagava," whose derivation is karag (tax) and ava (place). Locally the city is still referred to as "Kargava."

== Demographics ==
=== Population ===
At the time of the 2006 National Census, the city's population was 4,394 in 1,229 households. The following census in 2011 counted 4,992 people in 1,518 households. The 2016 census measured the population of the city as 5,375 people in 1,805 households.
