= Hasan Su =

Village in North Khorasan province, Iran

Hasan Su Persian: حسن سو
- Village
- Location within Iran
- Coordinates: 37°29′38″N 56°59′27″E
- Country: Iran
- Province: North Khorasan
- County: Samalqan
- District: Central
- Rural District: Howmeh

Population (2016)
  - Total: 622
- Time zone: UTC+3:30 (IRST)

Hasan Su (Persian: حسن سو) (Note: Also romanized as Ḩasan Sū) is a village in Howmeh Rural District of the Central District in Samalqan County, (Note: Formerly Maneh and Samalqan County) North Khorasan province, Iran.

== Demographics ==
=== Population ===
At the time of the 2006 National Census, the village's population was 728 in 178 households. The following census in 2011 counted 736 people in 208 households. The 2016 census measured the population of the village as 622 people in 198 households.
