= Howmeh Rural District (Samalqan County) =

Rural district in North Khorasan province, Iran

Howmeh Rural District Persian: دهستان حومه
- Rural District
- Location within Iran
- Coordinates: 37°30′36″N 56°52′48″E
- Country: Iran
- Province: North Khorasan
- County: Samalqan
- District: Central
- Established: 2001
- Capital: Eslamabad-e Kord

Population (2016)
  - Total: 14,725
- Time zone: UTC+3:30 (IRST)

Howmeh Rural District (Persian: دهستان حومه) is in the Central District of Samalqan County, (Note: Formerly Maneh and Samalqan County) North Khorasan province, Iran. Its capital is the village of Eslamabad-e Kord.

== Demographics ==
=== Population ===
At the time of the 2006 National Census, the rural district's population was 15,676 in 3,898 households. There were 16,718 inhabitants in 4,674 households at the following census of 2011. The 2016 census measured the population of the rural district as 14,725 in 4,526 households. The most populous of its 41 villages was Molla Hasan, with 1,734 people.

=== Other villages in the rural district ===
- Ansar
- Biar-e Kord
- Chakhmaqlu
- Darband
- Garmak
- Hasan Mast
- Hasan Su
- Kerik
- Mehmanak
- Naderabad
- Najaf
- Qarah Mosali
- Shirabad
- Shurak
- Zu-ye Olya
