= Najaf, Iran =

Village in North Khorasan province, Iran

Najaf Persian: نجف
- Village
- Location within Iran
- Coordinates: 37°34′19″N 56°53′46″E
- Country: Iran
- Province: North Khorasan
- County: Samalqan
- District: Central
- Rural District: Howmeh

Population (2016)
  - Total: 1,279
- Time zone: UTC+3:30 (IRST)

Najaf (Persian: نجف) (Note: Also known as Najaf-e Bālā, Najaf ‘Olyā, and Najaf-e ‘Olyā) is a village in Howmeh Rural District of the Central District in Samalqan County, (Note: Formerly Maneh and Samalqan County) North Khorasan province, Iran.

== Demographics ==
=== Population ===
At the time of the 2006 National Census, the village's population was 1,238 in 300 households. The following census in 2011 counted 1,352 people in 368 households. The 2016 census measured the population of the village as 1,279 people in 384 households.
