= Maragheh, Markazi =

Village in Markazi province, Iran

Maragheh Persian: مراغه
- Village
- Location within Iran
- Coordinates: 35°13′45″N 49°42′36″E
- Country: Iran
- Province: Markazi
- County: Saveh
- District: Nowbaran
- Rural District: Bayat

Population (2016)
  - Total: 303
- Time zone: UTC+3:30 (IRST)

Maragheh (Persian: مراغه) (Note: Also romanized as Marāgheh; also known as Marageh) is a village in Bayat Rural District of Nowbaran District in Saveh County, Markazi province, Iran.

== Demographics ==
=== Population ===
At the time of the 2006 National Census, the village's population was 398 in 157 households. The following census in 2011 counted 342 people in 141 households. The 2016 census measured the population of the village as 303 people in 120 households.
