= Biar-e Kord =

Village in North Khorasan province, Iran

Biar-e Kord Persian: بياركرد
- Village
- Location within Iran
- Coordinates: 37°32′11″N 56°57′05″E
- Country: Iran
- Province: North Khorasan
- County: Samalqan
- District: Central
- Rural District: Howmeh

Population (2016)
  - Total: 1,534
- Time zone: UTC+3:30 (IRST)

Biar-e Kord (Persian: بياركرد) (Note: Also romanized as Bīār-e Kord; also known as Beyār-e Barbar and Bīār-e Barbar) is a village in Howmeh Rural District of the Central District in Samalqan County, (Note: Formerly Maneh and Samalqan County) North Khorasan province, Iran.

== Demographics ==
=== Population ===
At the time of the 2006 National Census, the village's population was 1,496 in 395 households. The following census in 2011 counted 1,742 people in 509 households. The 2016 census measured the population of the village as 1,534 people in 469 households.
