= Ansar, North Khorasan =

Village in North Khorasan province, Iran

Ansar Persian: انصار
- Village
- Location within Iran
- Coordinates: 37°32′00″N 56°54′00″E
- Country: Iran
- Province: North Khorasan
- County: Samalqan
- District: Central
- Rural District: Howmeh

Population (2016)
  - Total: 480
- Time zone: UTC+3:30 (IRST)

Ansar (Persian: انصار) (Note: Also romanized as Anşār) is a village in Howmeh Rural District of the Central District in Samalqan County, (Note: Formerly Maneh and Samalqan County) North Khorasan province, Iran.

== Demographics ==
=== Population ===
At the time of the 2006 National Census, the village's population was 430 in 113 households. The following census in 2011 counted 567 people in 162 households. The 2016 census measured the population of the village as 480 people in 142 households.
