= Baleqlu, Markazi =

Village in Markazi province, Iran

Baleqlu Persian: بالُقلو
- Village
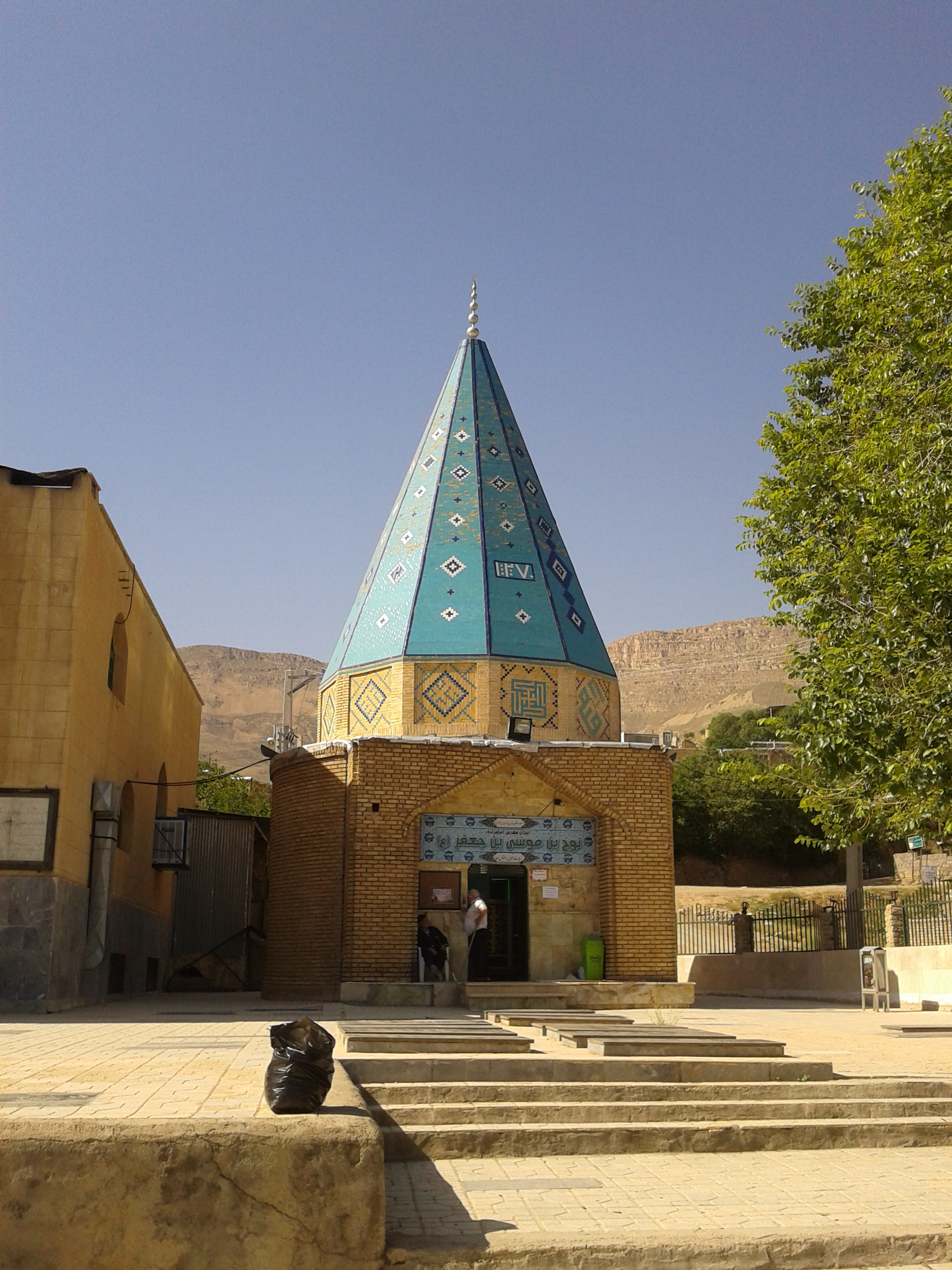
- Emamzadeh Noh in the village of Baleqlu

- Location within Iran
- Coordinates: 35°04′18″N 49°48′34″E
- Country: Iran
- Province: Markazi
- County: Saveh
- District: Nowbaran
- Rural District: Aq Kahriz

Population (2016)
  - Total: 1,091
- Time zone: UTC+3:30 (IRST)

Baleqlu (Persian: بالقلو) (Note: Also romanized as Bāleqlū and Baloqlu; also known as Balgholoo) is a village in Aq Kahriz Rural District of Nowbaran District in Saveh County, Markazi province, Iran.

== Demographics ==
=== Population ===
At the time of the 2006 National Census, the village's population was 1,331 in 396 households. The following census in 2011 counted 990 people in 319 households. The 2016 census measured the population of the village as 1,091 people in 390 households, the most populous in its rural district.

== Gallery ==
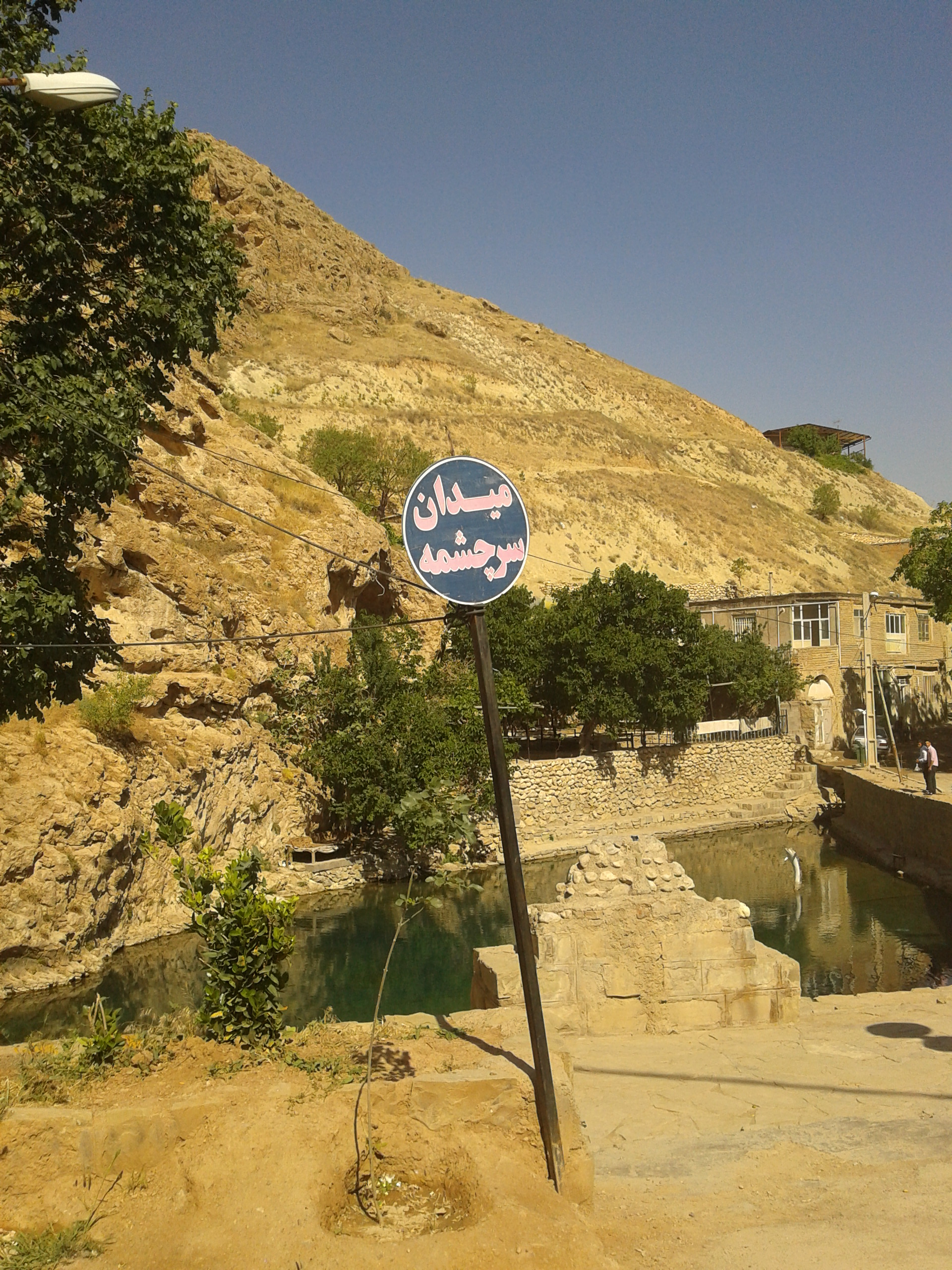

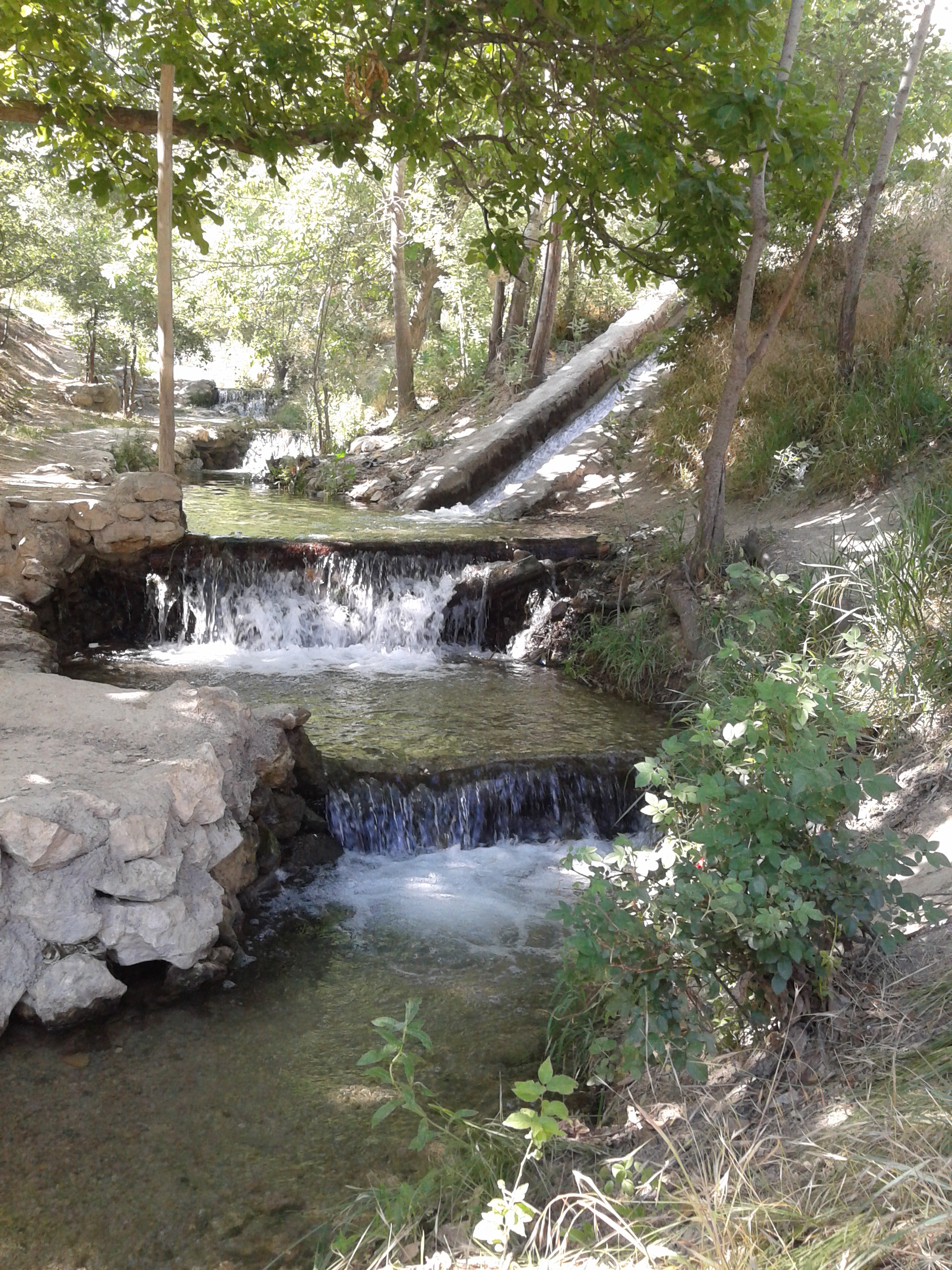

== See also ==
Media related to Baleqlu, Markazi at Wikimedia Commons
