= Darband, Samalqan =

Village in North Khorasan province, Iran

Darband Persian: دربند
- Village
- Location within Iran
- Coordinates: 37°36′02″N 56°59′10″E
- Country: Iran
- Province: North Khorasan
- County: Samalqan
- District: Central
- Rural District: Howmeh

Population (2016)
  - Total: 44
- Time zone: UTC+3:30 (IRST)

Darband (Persian: دربند) is a village in Howmeh Rural District of the Central District in Samalqan County, (Note: Formerly Maneh and Samalqan County) North Khorasan province, Iran.

== Demographics ==
=== Population ===
At the time of the 2006 National Census, the village's population was 89 in 20 households. The following census in 2011 counted 85 people in 23 households. The 2016 census measured the population of the village as 44 people in 15 households.
