= Garmak, Samalqan =

Village in North Khorasan province, Iran

Garmak Persian: گرمك
- Village
- Location within Iran
- Coordinates: 37°26′56″N 56°57′23″E
- Country: Iran
- Province: North Khorasan
- County: Samalqan
- District: Central
- Rural District: Howmeh

Population (2016)
  - Total: 389
- Time zone: UTC+3:30 (IRST)

Garmak (Persian: گرمك) (Note: Also romanized as Garmok) is a village in Howmeh Rural District of the Central District in Samalqan County, (Note: Formerly Maneh and Samalqan County) North Khorasan province, Iran.

== Demographics ==
=== Population ===
At the time of the 2006 National Census, the village's population was 487 in 112 households. The following census in 2011 counted 464 people in 124 households. The 2016 census measured the population of the village as 389 people in 109 households.
