= Zu-ye Sofla =

Zu-ye Sofla (Persian: زوسفلي) may refer to:

- Shirabad, Maneh and Samalqan, North Khorasan
- Shahr-e Zow, Razavi Khorasan
