= Shurak, North Khorasan =

Village in North Khorasan province, Iran

Shurak Persian: شورك
- Village
- Location within Iran
- Coordinates: 37°33′21″N 57°01′18″E
- Country: Iran
- Province: North Khorasan
- County: Samalqan
- District: Central
- Rural District: Howmeh

Population (2016)
  - Total: 143
- Time zone: UTC+3:30 (IRST)

Shurak (Persian: شورك) (Note: Also romanized as Shūrak; also known as Shūrak Zangāneh and Zangāneh) is a village in Howmeh Rural District of the Central District in Samalqan County, (Note: Formerly Maneh and Samalqan County) North Khorasan province, Iran.

== Demographics ==
=== Population ===
At the time of the 2006 National Census, the village's population was 188 in 46 households. The following census in 2011 counted 174 people in 53 households. The 2016 census measured the population of the village as 143 people in 49 households.
