= Eslamabad-e Kord =

Village in North Khorasan province, Iran

Eslamabad-e Kord Persian: اسلام اباد كرد
- Village
- Location within Iran
- Coordinates: 37°31′38″N 56°53′48″E
- Country: Iran
- Province: North Khorasan
- County: Samalqan
- District: Central
- Rural District: Howmeh

Population (2016)
  - Total: 1,167
- Time zone: UTC+3:30 (IRST)

Eslamabad-e Kord (Persian: اسلام ابادكرد) (Note: Also romanized as Eslāmābād-e Kord; also known as Eslāmābād, Shāhābād (شاه اباد), and Shāhābād-e Kord) is a village in, and the capital of, Howmeh Rural District in the Central District of Samalqan County, (Note: Formerly Maneh and Samalqan County) North Khorasan province, Iran.

== Demographics ==
=== Population ===
At the time of the 2006 National Census, the village's population was 1,360 in 326 households. The following census in 2011 counted 1,311 people in 373 households. The 2016 census measured the population of the village as 1,167 people in 367 households.
