= Qarah Mosali =

Village in North Khorasan province, Iran

Qarah Mosali Persian: قره مصلي
- Village
- Location within Iran
- Coordinates: 37°33′36″N 56°52′42″E
- Country: Iran
- Province: North Khorasan
- County: Samalqan
- District: Central
- Rural District: Howmeh

Population (2016)
  - Total: 1,311
- Time zone: UTC+3:30 (IRST)

Qarah Mosali (Persian: قره مصلي) (Note: Also romanized as Qarah Moşalī; also known as Gareh Mosalla, Qarah Moşallá, and Qareh Moşallá) is a village in Howmeh Rural District of the Central District in Samalqan County, (Note: Formerly Maneh and Samalqan County) North Khorasan province, Iran.

== Demographics ==
=== Population ===
At the time of the 2006 National Census, the village's population was 1,288 in 321 households. The following census in 2011 counted 1,443 people in 413 households. The 2016 census measured the population of the village as 1,311 people in 408 households.
