= Karik =

Karik or Kerik or Kareyak or Kariak (Persian: کریک) may refer to:

- Kareyak, Kohgiluyeh and Boyer-Ahmad
- Kerik, North Khorasan

== See also ==
- Karie (disambiguation)
- Karlik (disambiguation)
