= Nowbaran =

City in Markazi province, Iran

Nowbaran Persian: نوبران
- City
- Location within Iran
- Coordinates: 35°07′55″N 49°42′33″E
- Country: Iran
- Province: Markazi
- County: Saveh
- District: Nowbaran

Population (2016)
  - Total: 3,334
- Time zone: UTC+3:30 (IRST)

Nowbaran (Persian: نوبران) (Note: Also romanized as Nowbarān and Nūbarān) is a city in, and the capital of, Nowbaran District of Saveh County, Markazi province, Iran. It also serves as the administrative center for Bayat Rural District.

== Demographics ==
=== Population ===
At the time of the 2006 National Census, the city's population was 1,931 in 577 households. The following census in 2011 counted 2,170 people in 631 households. The 2016 census measured the population of the city as 3,334 people in 1,018 households.
