= Qarloq, Markazi =

Village in Markazi province, Iran

Qarloq Persian: قارلق
- Village
- Location within Iran
- Coordinates: 35°18′05″N 49°29′10″E
- Country: Iran
- Province: Markazi
- County: Saveh
- District: Nowbaran
- Rural District: Kuhpayeh

Population (2016)
  - Total: 238
- Time zone: UTC+3:30 (IRST)

Qarloq (Persian: قارلق) (Note: Also romanized as Qārloq; also known as Gharlogh, Qārlūq, and Qarlūq) is a village in Kuhpayeh Rural District of Nowbaran District in Saveh County, Markazi province, Iran.

== Demographics ==
=== Population ===
At the time of the 2006 National Census, the village's population was 143 in 57 households. The following census in 2011 counted 160 people in 70 households. The 2016 census measured the population of the village as 238 people in 75 households.
