= Sadashiva Karnik =

Indian-born American molecular biologist

Sadashiva "Sadu" Karnik is an Indian-born American molecular biologist who is a Professor in the Molecular Medicine Department of Cleveland Clinic Lerner College of Medicine at Case Western Reserve University. He is the Principal Investigator of the Sadashiva Karnik Laboratory, at the Lerner Research Institute of Cleveland Clinic.

== Early life and education ==
Sadu Karnik earned a B.Sc. degree in botany, zoology and chemistry from Sri Poornaprajna College, Udupi in 1973 and a M.Sc. degree in Clinical Biochemistry by research from Kasturba Medical College, Manipal. He entered the Indian Institute of Science, Department of Microbiology and Cell Biology Bengaluru in 1976 for doctoral studies on Mycobacteriophage in the laboratory of Prof. K.P Gopinathan. His post-doctoral studies were on Bacteriophage Qβ at the laboratory of molecular biologist Martin Billetter of the ETH Institute for Molecular Biology, University of Zurich, Switzerland. He later joined the laboratory of Har Gobind Khorana at Massachusetts Institute of Technology to study disulfide-bonding in integral membrane proteins. He became a naturalized citizen of the United States in 1995.

== Career ==
Karnik started his independent laboratory at the Cleveland Clinic research foundation as assistant staff studying Angiotensin receptor molecular biology and was promoted to full-staff in 2002. In 2000 he received conjoint appointment as professor of chemistry and biology at Cleveland State University (CSU), Cleveland, OH, and in 2003, he became Professor (non-tenure track) of Molecular Medicine in the newly accredited Cleveland Clinic Lerner College of Medicine (CCLCM) at Case Western Reserve University, Cleveland, Ohio. His research programs have been supported by National Institutes of Health funding continuously for the past 25 years.

=== Research ===
The Karnik Laboratory is known for first reporting of constitutive activation, atypical G protein coupling, biased ligand signaling, X-ray structure of antihypertensive drug bound angiotensin receptor, and structure-based allosteric ligand of Angiotensin receptors. These discoveries facilitated the development of novel transgenic models of cardiovascular diseases, β-arrestin biased agonists, next generation antihypertensive drugs and novel structures of GPCRs. His current research is aimed at developing novel allosteric ligand drugs for intervention in Preeclampsia due to autoimmunity and Hyperaldosteronism due to adrenal hyperplasia. In 1986, Karnik and colleagues at MIT reported that production of a functional, light sensing-state of rhodopsin depended on formation of a unique disulfide bond that is conserved in >90% GPCRs. The Karnik Laboratory at Cleveland Clinic extended this finding to other hormone and neurotransmitter GPCRs including β-adrenegic and angiotensin receptors.

== Awards and honors ==
Karnik won several fellowships including the Junior Research Fellowship of the Indian Institute of Science, Department of Science Technology (India) Senior Research Fellowship and the Swiss National Science Foundation Fellowship.

- In 1999, he was awarded Established Investigator of American Heart Association
- In 2001 he earned the Astra-Zeneca Basic Research Award
- In 2013 he became Chair of IUPHAR Committee on Angiotensin Receptors and continues his service in that position.

== Selected bibliography ==
- Unal, Hamiyet; Karnik, Sadashiva S. (2014). "Constitutive Activity in the Angiotensin II Type 1 Receptor". Pharmacology & Therapeutics of Constitutively Active Receptors. Advances in Pharmacology. Vol. 70. Elsevier. pp. 155–174. doi:10.1016/b978-0-12-417197-8.00006-7. ISBN 978-0-12-417197-8. PMC 7500102. PMID 24931196.
- Miura, S.; Karnik, S. S. (1999). "Angiotensin II type 1 and type 2 receptors bind angiotensin II through different types of epitope recognition". Journal of Hypertension. 17 (3): 397–404. doi:10.1097/00004872-199917030-00013. ISSN 0263-6352. PMID 10100078.
- Miura, S.; Karnik, S. S. (2000-08-01). "Ligand-independent signals from angiotensin II type 2 receptor induce apoptosis". The EMBO Journal. 19 (15): 4026–4035. doi:10.1093/emboj/19.15.4026. ISSN 0261-4189. PMC 306598. PMID 10921883.
- Holloway, Alice C.; Qian, Hongwei; Pipolo, Luisa; Ziogas, James; Miura, Shin-ichiro; Karnik, Sadashiva; Southwell, Bridget R.; Lew, Michael J.; Thomas, Walter G. (2002). "Side-chain substitutions within angiotensin II reveal different requirements for signaling, internalization, and phosphorylation of type 1A angiotensin receptors". Molecular Pharmacology. 61 (4): 768–777. doi:10.1124/mol.61.4.768. ISSN 0026-895X. PMID 11901215.
- Wei, Huijun; Ahn, Seungkirl; Shenoy, Sudha K.; Karnik, Sadashiva S.; Hunyady, László; Luttrell, Louis M.; Lefkowitz, Robert J. (2003-09-16). "Independent beta-arrestin 2 and G protein-mediated pathways for angiotensin II activation of extracellular signal-regulated kinases 1 and 2". Proceedings of the National Academy of Sciences of the United States of America. 100 (19): 10782–10787. Bibcode:2003PNAS..10010782W. doi:10.1073/pnas.1834556100. ISSN 0027-8424. PMC 196880. PMID 12949261.
- Zhang, Haitao; Unal, Hamiyet; Gati, Cornelius; Han, Gye Won; Liu, Wei; Zatsepin, Nadia A.; James, Daniel; Wang, Dingjie; Nelson, Garrett; Weierstall, Uwe; Sawaya, Michael R. (2015-05-07). "Structure of the Angiotensin receptor revealed by serial femtosecond crystallography". Cell. 161 (4): 833–844. Bibcode:2015Cell..161..833Z. doi:10.1016/j.cell.2015.04.011. ISSN 1097-4172. PMC 4427029. PMID 25913193.
- Zhang, Haitao; Unal, Hamiyet; Desnoyer, Russell; Han, Gye Won; Patel, Nilkanth; Katritch, Vsevolod; Karnik, Sadashiva S.; Cherezov, Vadim; Stevens, Raymond C. (2015-12-04). "Structural Basis for Ligand Recognition and Functional Selectivity at Angiotensin Receptor". The Journal of Biological Chemistry. 290 (49): 29127–29139. doi:10.1074/jbc.M115.689000. ISSN 1083-351X. PMC 4705918. PMID 26420482.
- Singh, Khuraijam Dhanachandra; Unal, Hamiyet; Desnoyer, Russell; Karnik, Sadashiva S. (2018). "Divergent Spatiotemporal Interaction of Angiotensin Receptor Blocking Drugs with Angiotensin Type 1 Receptor". Journal of Chemical Information and Modeling. 58 (1): 182–193. doi:10.1021/acs.jcim.7b00424. ISSN 1549-960X. PMC 6058968. PMID 29195045.
- Karnik, S. S.; Khorana, H. G. (1990-10-15). "Assembly of functional rhodopsin requires a disulfide bond between cysteine residues 110 and 187". The Journal of Biological Chemistry. 265 (29): 17520–17524. doi:10.1016/S0021-9258(18)38195-X. ISSN 0021-9258. PMID 2145276.
- Tremblay, Mark S; LeBlanc, Allana G; Kho, Michelle E; Saunders, Travis J; Larouche, Richard; Colley, Rachel C; Goldfield, Gary; Gorber, Sarah Connor (2011-09-21). "Systematic review of sedentary behaviour and health indicators in school-aged children and youth". The International Journal of Behavioral Nutrition and Physical Activity. 8: 98. doi:10.1186/1479-5868-8-98. ISSN 1479-5868. PMC 3186735. PMID 21936895.<
