= Karluk =

Karluk or Qarluq may refer to:

== Alaska ==
- Karluk River, a river on Kodiak Island in Alaska, USA.
  - Karluk, Alaska, a town at the mouth of the Karluk River
    - Karluk Airport
- Karluk (1884 ship), a ship crushed and sunk by Arctic ice in January 1914.

== Asia ==
- Karluk languages, spoken in Central Asia and Western China
- Karluks (also known as Qarluqs), a Turkic pastoral and agricultural tribe in Central Asia
  - Karluk Yabghu, a polity ruled by Karluk tribes in the 8th-9th centuries.
- Qarluq, Uzbekistan, an urban-type settlement in Uzbekistan
- Qarluq, Iran (disambiguation), several locations in Iran

== Other uses ==
- Karluk (ship)

== See also ==
- Karlik (disambiguation)
