= Kuhpayeh Rural District (Saveh County) =

Rural district in Markazi province, Iran

Kuhpayeh Rural District Persian: دهستان كوهپايه
- Rural District
- Location within Iran
- Coordinates: 35°17′N 49°32′E
- Country: Iran
- Province: Markazi
- County: Saveh
- District: Nowbaran
- Established: 1987
- Capital: Yatan

Population (2016)
  - Total: 5,391
- Time zone: UTC+3:30 (IRST)

Kuhpayeh Rural District (Persian: دهستان كوهپايه) is in Nowbaran District of Saveh County, Markazi province, Iran. Its capital is the village of Yatan.

== Demographics ==
=== Population ===
At the time of the 2006 National Census, the rural district's population was 3,891 in 1,453 households. There were 4,912 inhabitants in 1,977 households at the following census of 2011. The 2016 census measured the population of the rural district as 5,391 in 2,061 households. The most populous of its 24 villages was Yatan, with 993 people.

=== Other villages in the rural district ===
- Jalakbar
- Jushqan
- Khaneqah
- Koreh Bar
- Maqsudabad
- Qarloq
- Qermezin
- Saman
