= Shirabad, Samalqan =

Village in North Khorasan province, Iran

Shirabad Persian: شيراباد
- Village
- Location within Iran
- Coordinates: 37°30′55″N 56°55′38″E
- Country: Iran
- Province: North Khorasan
- County: Samalqan
- District: Central
- Rural District: Howmeh

Population (2016)
  - Total: 733
- Time zone: UTC+3:30 (IRST)

Shirabad (Persian: شيراباد) (Note: Also romanized as Shīrābād; also known as Shahrābād, Shahrābād Kord, Shīrābād-e Soflá, and Zū-ye Soflá (زوسفلي)) is a village in Howmeh Rural District of the Central District in Samalqan County, (Note: Formerly Maneh and Samalqan County) North Khorasan province, Iran.

== Demographics ==
=== Population ===
At the time of the 2006 National Census, the village's population was 774 in 204 households. The following census in 2011 counted 944 people in 261 households. The 2016 census measured the population of the village as 733 people in 225 households.
