= Molla Hasan, North Khorasan =

Village in North Khorasan province, Iran

Molla Hasan Persian: ملاحسن
- Village
- Location within Iran
- Coordinates: 37°32′50″N 56°53′50″E
- Country: Iran
- Province: North Khorasan
- County: Samalqan
- District: Central
- Rural District: Howmeh

Population (2016)
  - Total: 1,734
- Time zone: UTC+3:30 (IRST)

Molla Hasan (Persian: ملاحسن) (Note: Also romanized as Mollā Ḩasan; also known as Mollā Ḩoseyn) is a village in Howmeh Rural District of the Central District in Samalqan County, (Note: Formerly Maneh and Samalqan County) North Khorasan province, Iran.

== Demographics ==
=== Population ===
At the time of the 2006 National Census, the village's population was 1,646 in 414 households. The following census in 2011 counted 1,778 people in 510 households. The 2016 census measured the population of the village as 1,734 people in 536 households, the most populous in its rural district.
