= Kashkevar, Qazvin =

Kashkevar كشكور
- Village
- Location within Iran
- Coordinates: 36°45′41″N 49°08′39″E
- Country: Iran
- Province: Qazvin
- County: Qazvin
- Bakhsh: Tarom Sofla
- Rural District: Khandan

Population (2006)
  - Total: 163
- Time zone: UTC+3:30 (IRST)
  - Summer (DST): UTC+4:30 (IRDT)

Kashkevar (Persian: كشكور) is a village in Khandan Rural District, Tarom Sofla District, Qazvin County, Qazvin Province, Iran. At the 2006 census, its population was 163, in 42 families.
