= Molla Hasani, Hormozgan =

Molla Hasani ملاحسني
- Village
- Location within Iran
- Coordinates: 27°09′18″N 57°01′36″E
- Country: Iran
- Province: Hormozgan
- County: Minab
- Bakhsh: Central
- Rural District: Howmeh

Population (2006)
  - Total: 200
- Time zone: UTC+3:30 (IRST)
  - Summer (DST): UTC+4:30 (IRDT)

Molla Hasani (Persian: ملاحسني, also Romanized as Mollā Ḩasanī) is a village in Howmeh Rural District, in the Central District of Minab County, Hormozgan Province, Iran. At the 2006 census, its population was 200, in 43 families.
