= Kolik, West Azerbaijan =

Kolik كليك
- Village
- Location within Iran
- Coordinates: 39°42′49″N 44°39′52″E
- Country: Iran
- Province: West Azerbaijan
- County: Maku
- Bakhsh: Bazargan
- Rural District: Chaybasar-e Shomali

Population (2006)
  - Total: 165
- Time zone: UTC+3:30 (IRST)
  - Summer (DST): UTC+4:30 (IRDT)

Kolik (Persian: كليك, also Romanized as Kolīk; also known as Gelīk-e Qadīm) is a village in Chaybasar-e Shomali Rural District, Bazargan District, Maku County, West Azerbaijan Province, Iran. At the 2006 census, its population was 165, in 23 families.
