= Chakhmaqlu, North Khorasan =

Village in North Khorasan province, Iran

Chakhmaqlu Persian: چخماقلو
- Village
- Location within Iran
- Coordinates: 37°27′11″N 56°54′40″E
- Country: Iran
- Province: North Khorasan
- County: Samalqan
- District: Central
- Rural District: Howmeh

Population (2016)
  - Total: 1,244
- Time zone: UTC+3:30 (IRST)

Chakhmaqlu (Persian: چخماقلو) (Note: Also romanized as Chakhmāqlū; also known as Chakhmāghlū) is a village in Howmeh Rural District of the Central District in Samalqan County, (Note: Formerly Maneh and Samalqan County) North Khorasan province, Iran.

== Demographics ==
=== Population ===
At the time of the 2006 National Census, the village's population was 1,609 in 367 households. The following census in 2011 counted 1,466 people in 390 households. The 2016 census measured the population of the village as 1,244 people in 366 households.
