= Karlík =

- Municipality
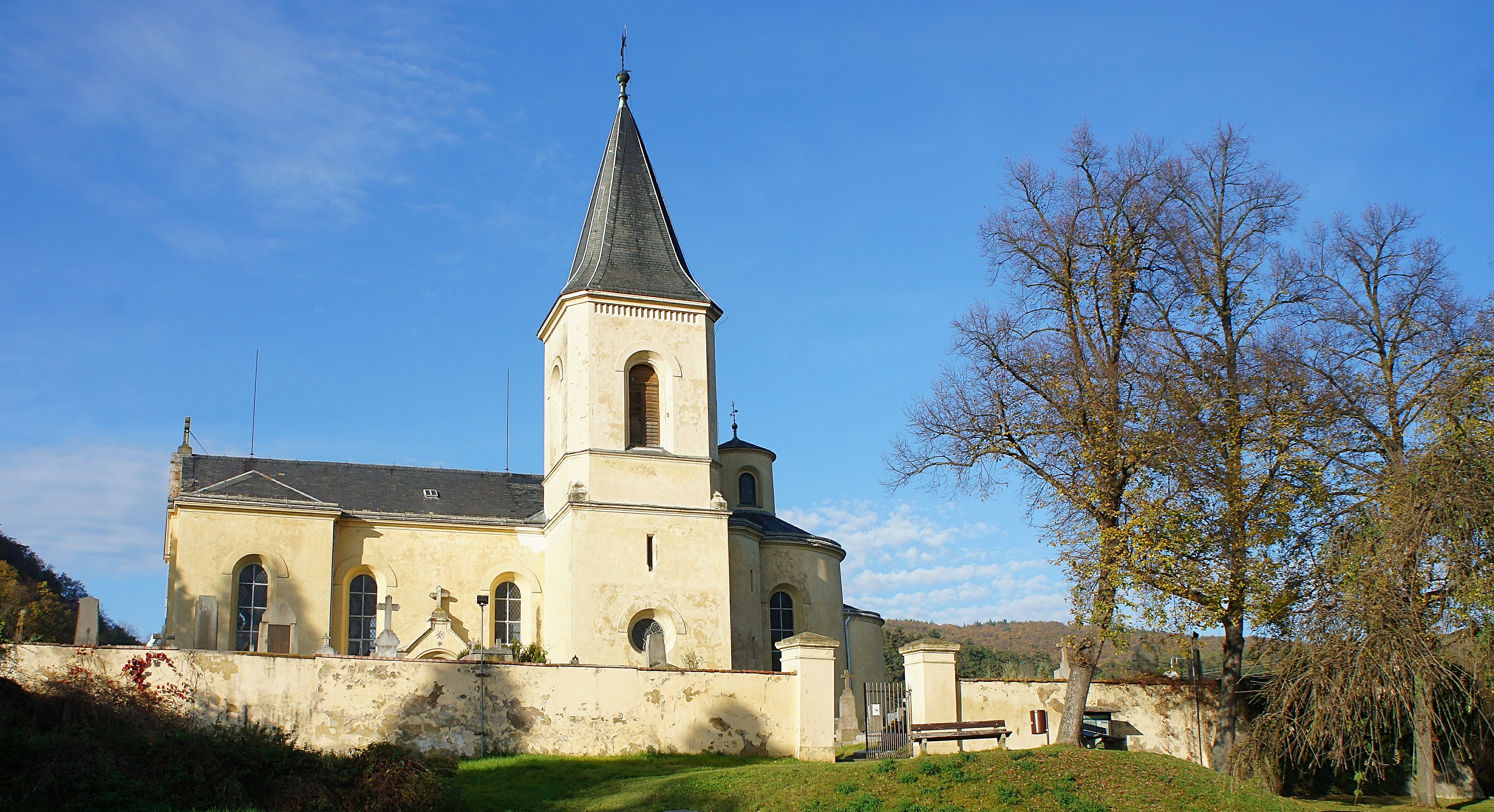
- Church of Saints Martin and Procopius

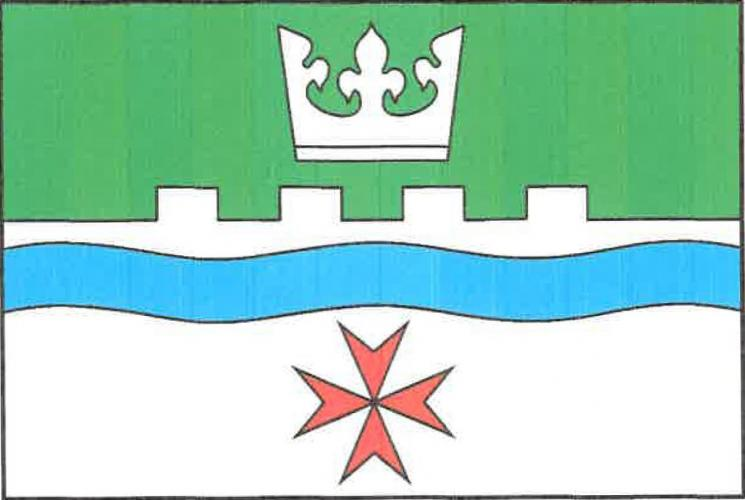
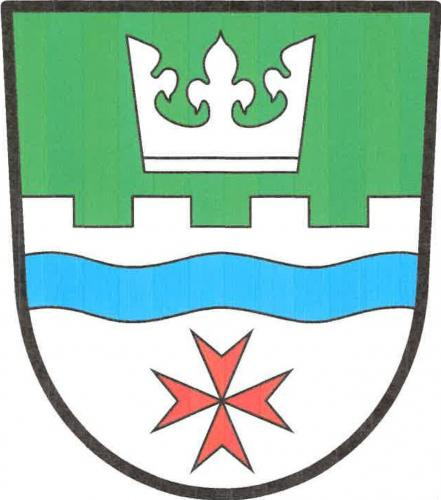
- Flag Coat of arms

- Location in the Czech Republic
- Coordinates: 49°56′8″N 14°15′34″E
- Country: Czech Republic
- Region: Central Bohemian
- District: Prague-West
- First mentioned: 1253

Area
  - Total: 1.88 km^{2} (0.73 sq mi)
- Elevation: 219 m (719 ft)

Population (2026-01-01)
  - Total: 482
  - Density: 256/km^{2} (664/sq mi)
- Time zone: UTC+1 (CET)
  - Summer (DST): UTC+2 (CEST)
- Postal code: 252 29
- Website: www.obeckarlik.cz

Karlík is a municipality and village in Prague-West District in the Central Bohemian Region of the Czech Republic. It has about 500 inhabitants.

== History ==
The first written mention of Karlík is from 1253.

== Demographics ==
Historical population
Year	Pop.	±%
1869	175	—
1880	206	+17.7%
1890	180	−12.6%
1900	200	+11.1%
1910	178	−11.0%
1921	165	−7.3%
1930	270	+63.6%
1950	201	−25.6%
1961	196	−2.5%
1970	194	−1.0%
1980	220	+13.4%
1991	192	−12.7%
2001	274	+42.7%
2011	469	+71.2%
2021	518	+10.4%
Source: Censuses
