= Zu-ye Olya =

Village in North Khorasan province, Iran

Zu-ye Olya Persian: زوعليا
- Village
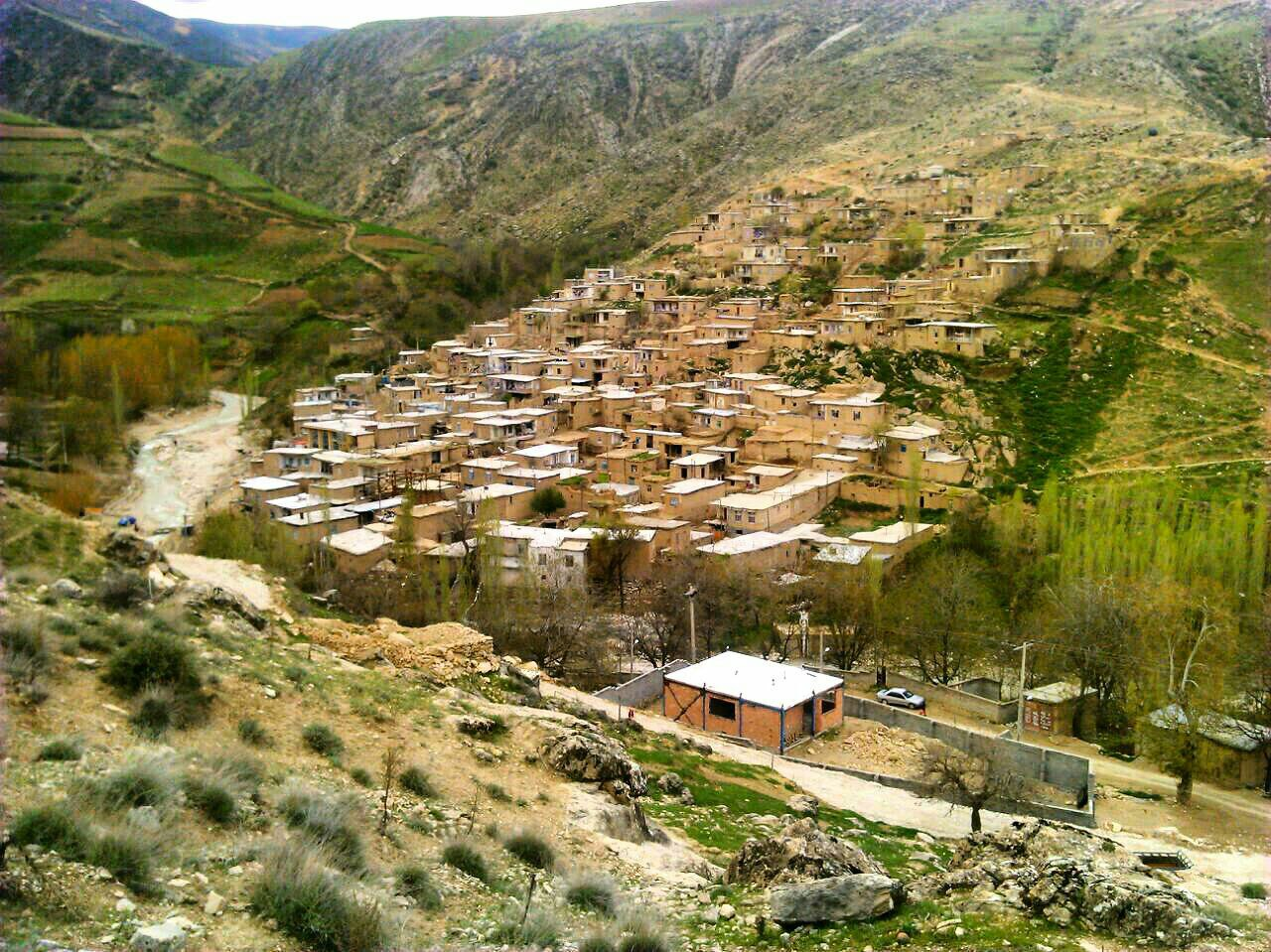
- The village of Zu-ye Olya

- Location within Iran
- Coordinates: 37°30′00″N 56°56′16″E
- Country: Iran
- Province: North Khorasan
- County: Samalqan
- District: Central
- Rural District: Howmeh

Population (2016)
  - Total: 546
- Time zone: UTC+3:30 (IRST)

Zu-ye Olya (Persian: زوعليا) (Note: Also romanized as Zow-ye ‘Olyā and Zū-ye ‘Olyā; also known as Zow, Zū-ye Bālā, and Zūye ‘Olya) is a village in Howmeh Rural District of the Central District in Samalqan County, (Note: Formerly Maneh and Samalqan County) North Khorasan province, Iran.

== Demographics ==
=== Population ===
At the time of the 2006 National Census, the village's population was 673 in 146 households. The following census in 2011 counted 575 people in 137 households. The 2016 census measured the population of the village as 546 people in 157 households.
