= Aq Kahriz Rural District =

Rural district in Markazi province, Iran

Aq Kahriz Rural District Persian: دهستان آق كهريز
- Rural District
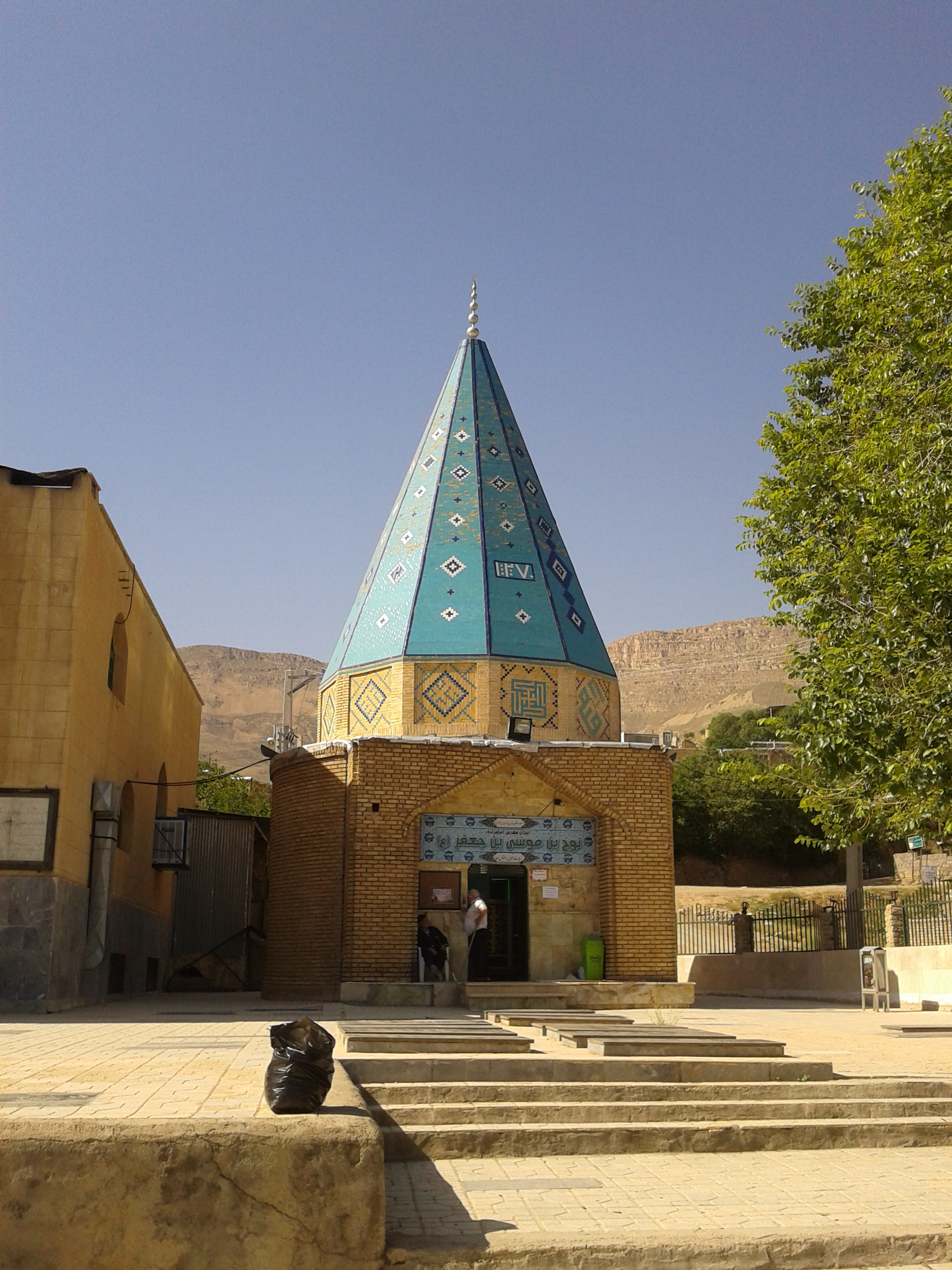
- Emamzadeh Noh in the village of Baleqlu

- Location within Iran
- Coordinates: 35°09′N 49°51′E
- Country: Iran
- Province: Markazi
- County: Saveh
- District: Nowbaran
- Established: 1987
- Capital: Piman

Population (2016)
  - Total: 4,076
- Time zone: UTC+3:30 (IRST)

Aq Kahriz Rural District (Persian: دهستان آق كهريز) is in Nowbaran District of Saveh County, Markazi province, Iran. Its capital is the village of Piman.

== Demographics ==
=== Population ===
At the time of the 2006 National Census, the rural district's population was 4,712 in 1,564 households. There were 3,578 inhabitants in 1,370 households at the following census of 2011. The 2016 census measured the population of the rural district as 4,076 in 1,615 households. The most populous of its 30 villages was Baleqlu, with 1,091 people.

=== Other villages in the rural district ===
- Ali Darzi
- Bivaran
- Chamran
- Ghazemabad
- Kahak-e Sofla
- Mar
