= Kerik, North Khorasan =

Village in North Khorasan province, Iran

Kerik Persian: كريك
- Village
- Location within Iran
- Coordinates: 37°34′37″N 56°57′00″E
- Country: Iran
- Province: North Khorasan
- County: Samalqan
- District: Central
- Rural District: Howmeh

Population (2016)
  - Total: 1,122
- Time zone: UTC+3:30 (IRST)

Kerik (Persian: كريك) (Note: Also romanized as Kerīk and Kerrik) is a village in Howmeh Rural District of the Central District in Samalqan County, (Note: Formerly Maneh and Samalqan County) North Khorasan province, Iran.

== Demographics ==
=== Population ===
At the time of the 2006 National Census, the village's population was 1,098 in 278 households. The following census in 2011 counted 1,204 people in 345 households. The 2016 census measured the population of the village as 1,122 people in 346 households.
