= Bayat Rural District =

Rural district in Markazi province, Iran

Bayat Rural District Persian: دهستان بيات
- Rural District
- Location within Iran
- Coordinates: 35°05′N 49°31′E
- Country: Iran
- Province: Markazi
- County: Saveh
- District: Nowbaran
- Established: 1987
- Capital: Nowbaran

Population (2016)
  - Total: 6,006
- Time zone: UTC+3:30 (IRST)

Bayat Rural District (Persian: دهستان بيات) is in Nowbaran District of Saveh County, Markazi province, Iran. It is administered from the city of Nowbaran.

== Demographics ==
=== Population ===
At the time of the 2006 National Census, the rural district's population was 5,502 in 1,647 households. There were 5,337 inhabitants in 1,976 households at the following census of 2011. The 2016 census measured the population of the rural district as 6,006 in 2,308 households. The most populous of its 48 villages was Setaq, with 1,046 people.

=== Other villages in the rural district ===
- Aqcheh Qaleh
- Dakhan
- Damurchi
- Maragheh
- Mazlaqan
- Qaleh-ye Teyn
