= Nowbaran District =

District in Markazi province, Iran

Nowbaran District Persian: بخش نوبران
- District
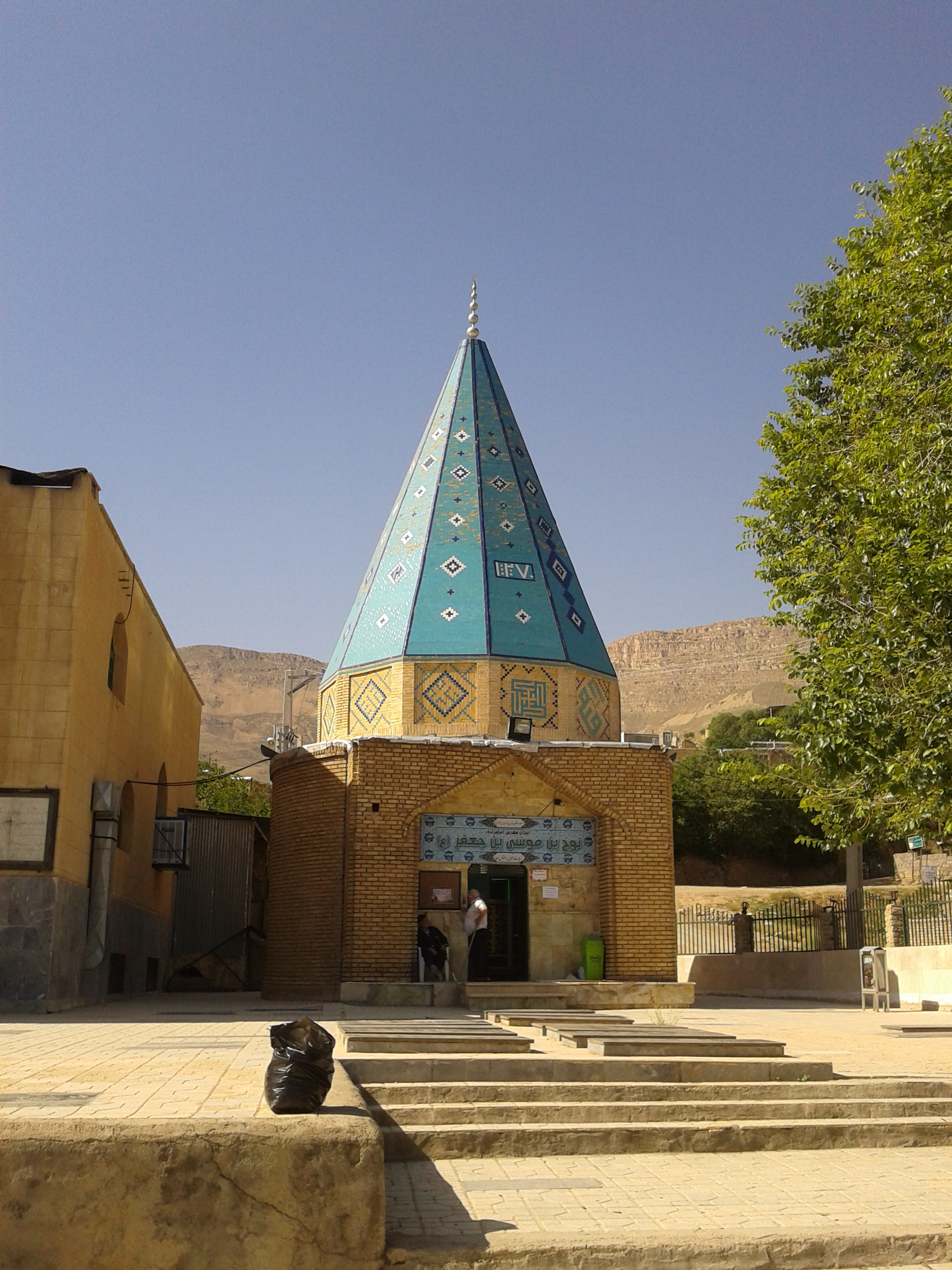
- Emamzadeh Noh in Baleqlu

- Location within Iran
- Coordinates: 35°09′N 49°43′E
- Country: Iran
- Province: Markazi
- County: Saveh
- Capital: Nowbaran

Population (2016)
  - Total: 24,182
- Time zone: UTC+3:30 (IRST)

Nowbaran District (Persian: بخش نوبران) is in Saveh County, Markazi province, Iran. Its capital is the city of Nowbaran.

== Demographics ==
=== Population ===
At the time of the 2006 National Census, the district's population was 20,430 in 6,470 households. The following census in 2011 counted 20,989 people in 7,472 households. The 2016 census measured the population of the district as 24,182 inhabitants in 8,807 households.

=== Administrative divisions ===
Nowbaran District Population
Administrative Divisions	2006	2011	2016
Aq Kahriz RD	4,712	3,578	4,076
Bayat RD	5,502	5,337	6,006
Kuhpayeh RD	3,891	4,912	5,391
Gharqabad (city)	4,394	4,992	5,375
Nowbaran (city)	1,931	2,170	3,334
Total	20,430	20,989	24,182
RD = Rural District
