= Tehran Gate, Qazvin =

National heritage site in Qazvin, Iran

Coordinates: 36°15′31″N 50°00′50″E

Tehran Gate دروازه تهران قدیم
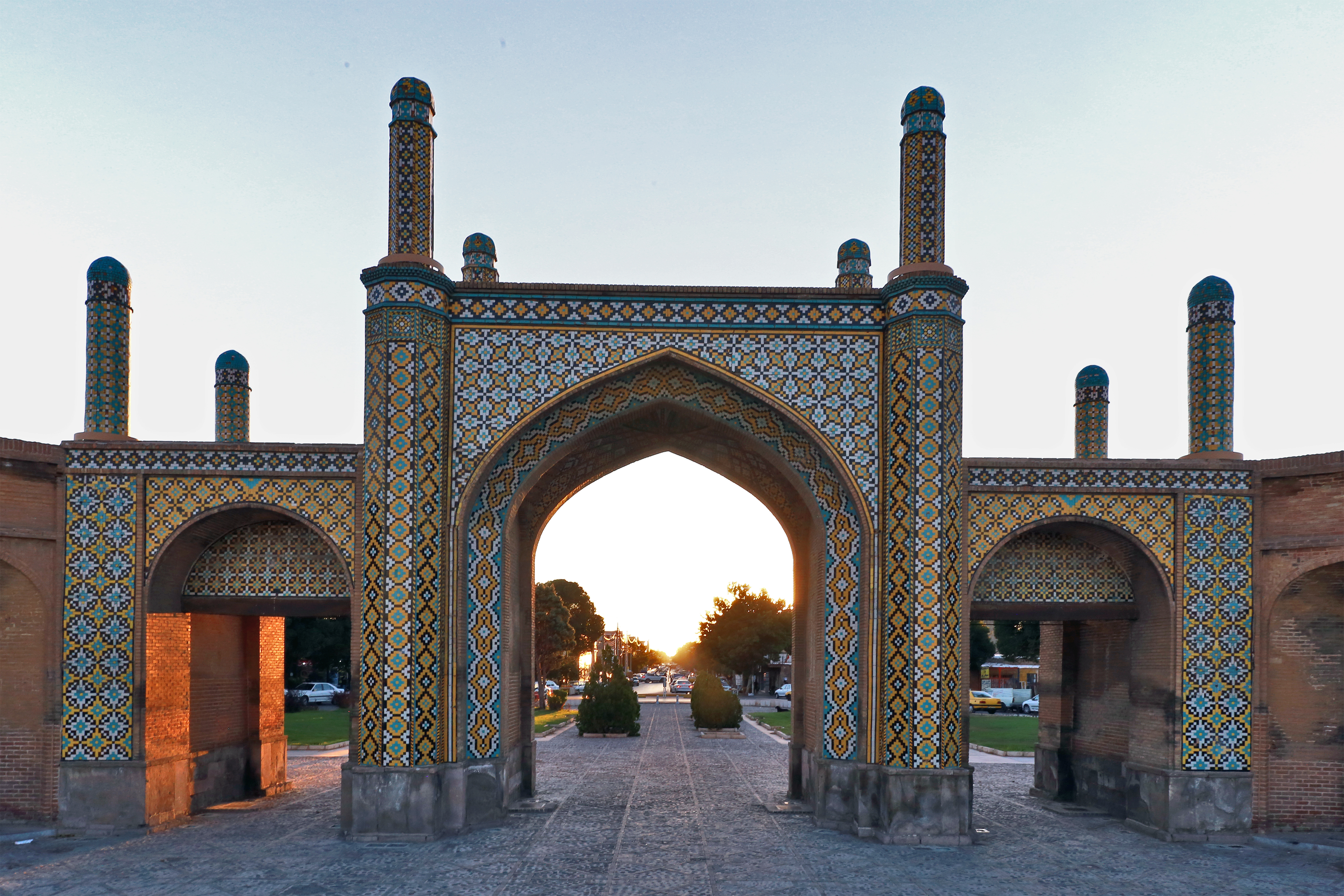
- Interactive map of Tehran Gate دروازه تهران قدیم
- Location: Qazvin, Qazvin province, Iran

History
- Built: Qajar era

Iran National Heritage List
- Official name: Tehran Gate
- Type: Gate
- Designated: 1955
- Reference no.: 392
- Conservation organization: Cultural Heritage, Handicrafts and Tourism Organization of Iran

The Old Tehran Gate (Persian: دروازه تهران قدیم), or simply the Tehran Gate (دروازه تهران), is a historic gate in Qazvin, Iran. It is one of the only 2 remaining city gates of Qazvin, the other being the Darb Kushk Gate.

It is located at the south east entrance of the city, allowing for people who came from Tehran to enter. Thus, it was named the Tehran gate, the gate that is at the direction to Tehran. Although it was built on the outskirts of Qazvin, it is now located within the city due to its expansion. It is listed in Iranian national heritage sites with the number 392.

There used to be a counterpart to this gate in Tehran, named Qazvin gate, that was located at the other end of the Tehran-Qazvin road.

== Gallery ==
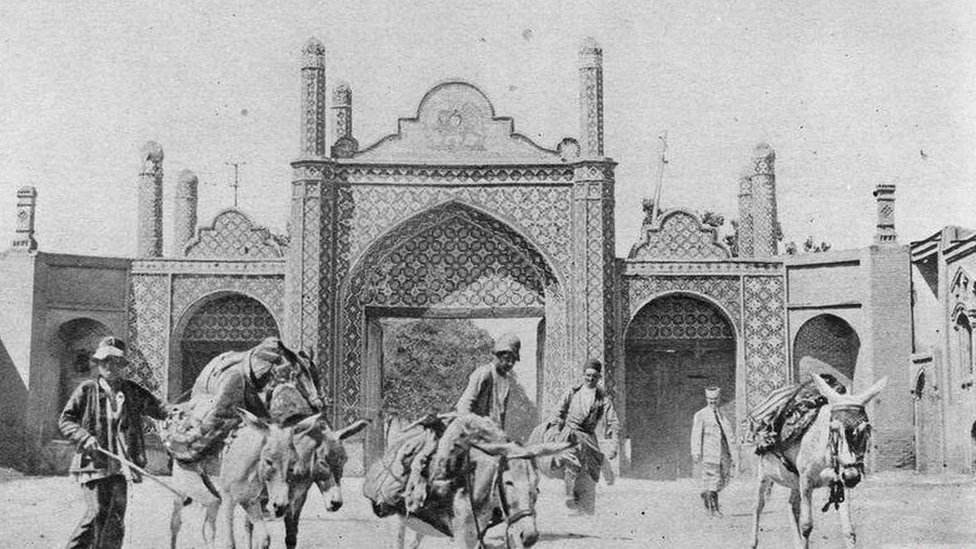
Photograph of Tehran Gate, circa 1900

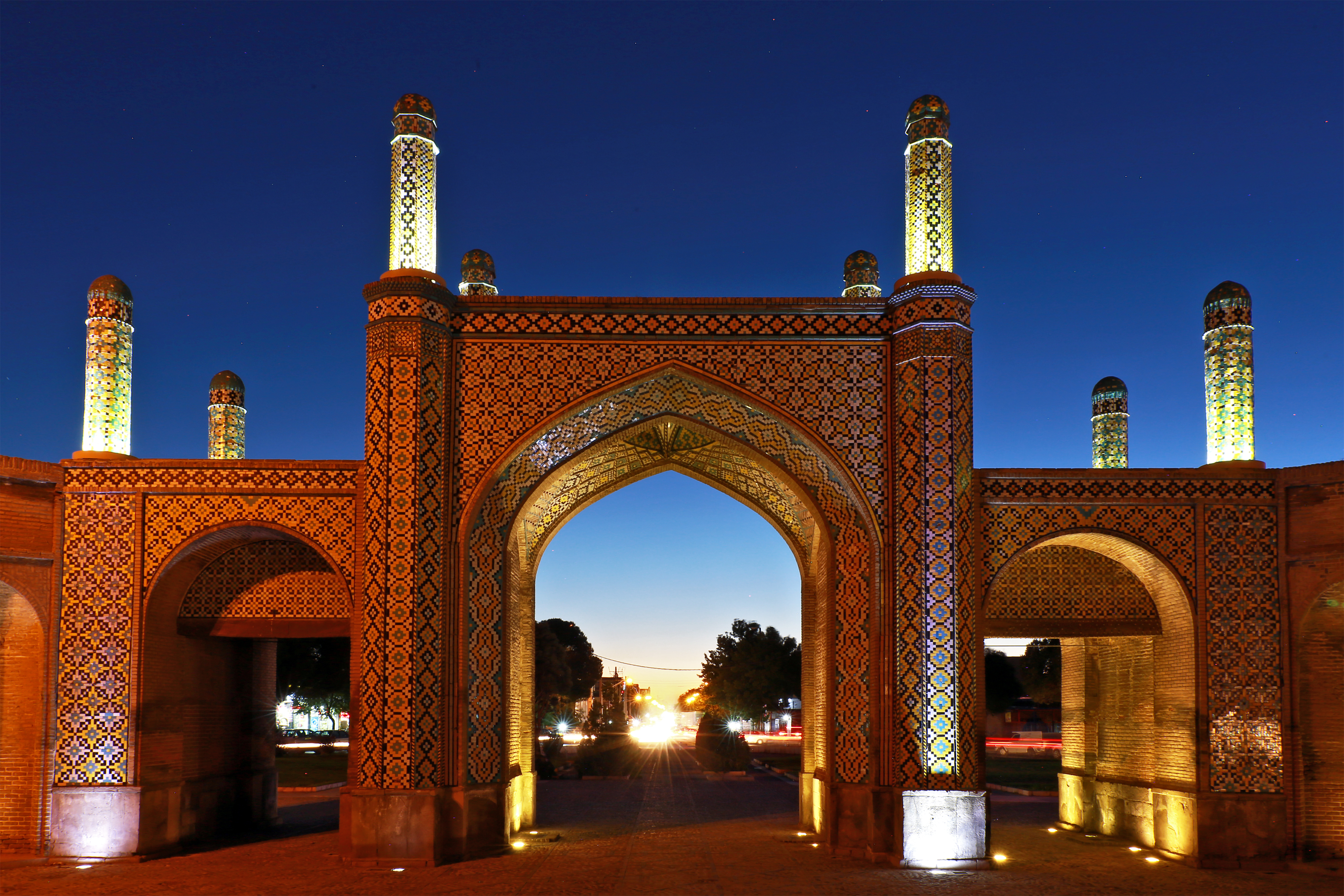
At night

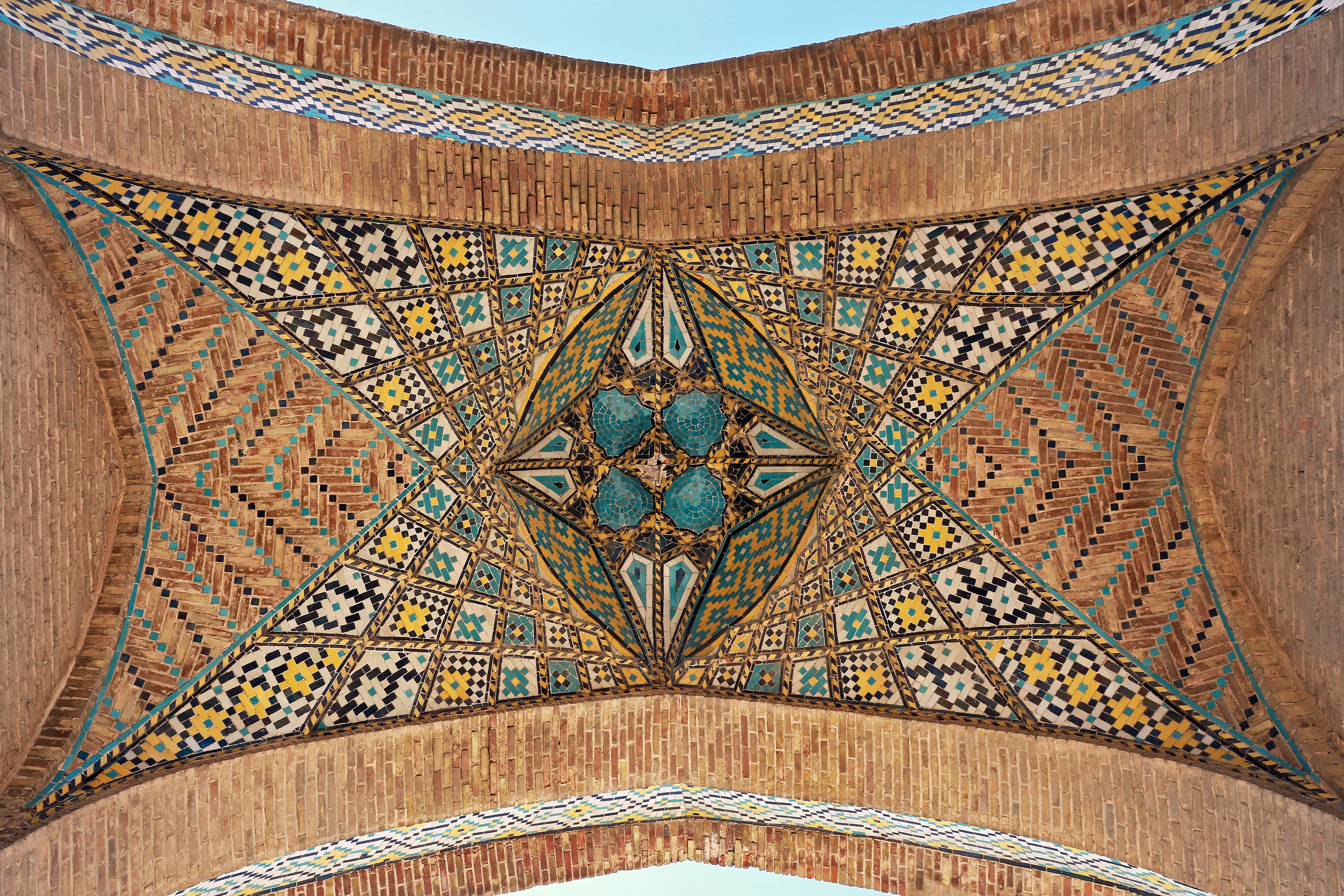
Ceiling

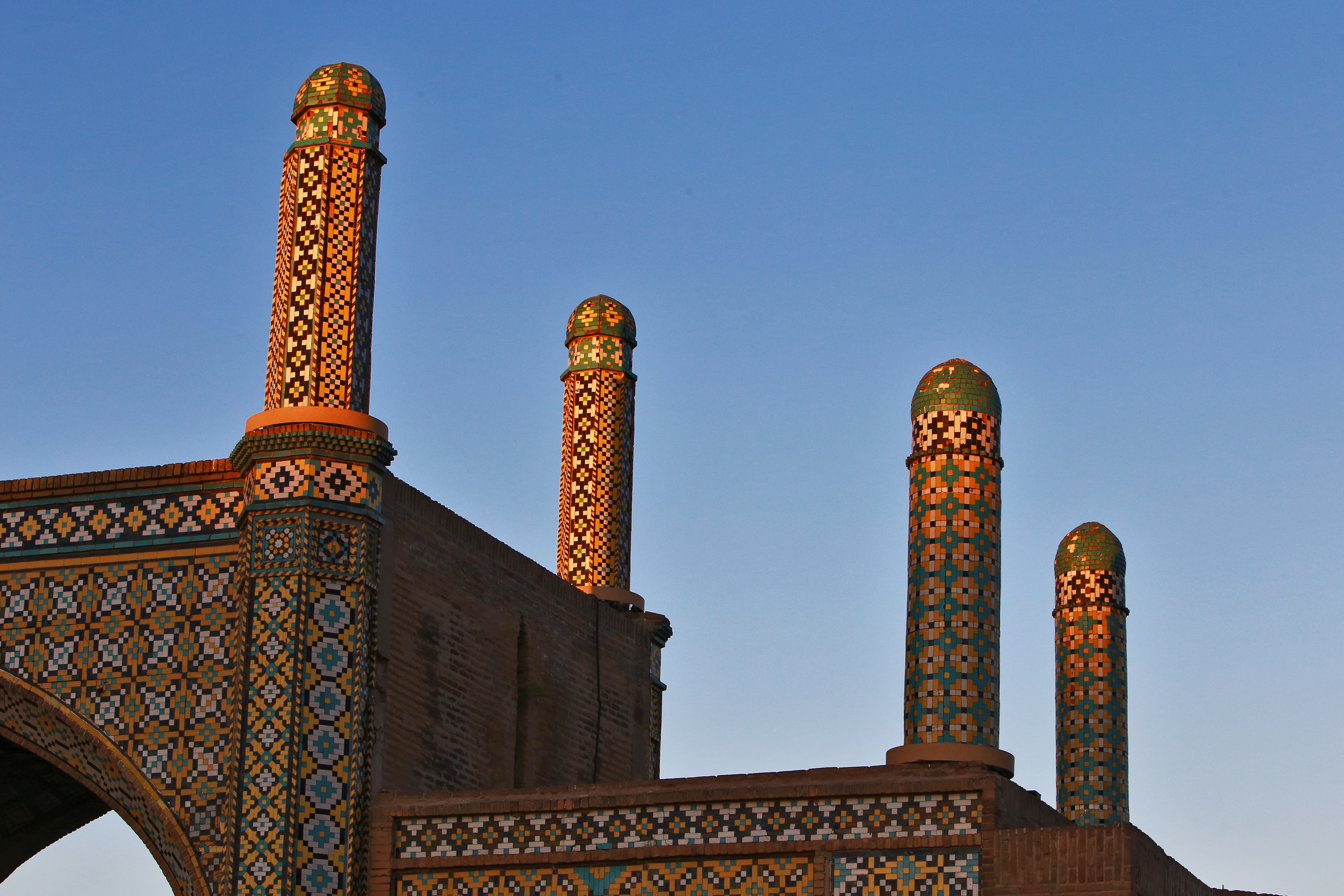
Details

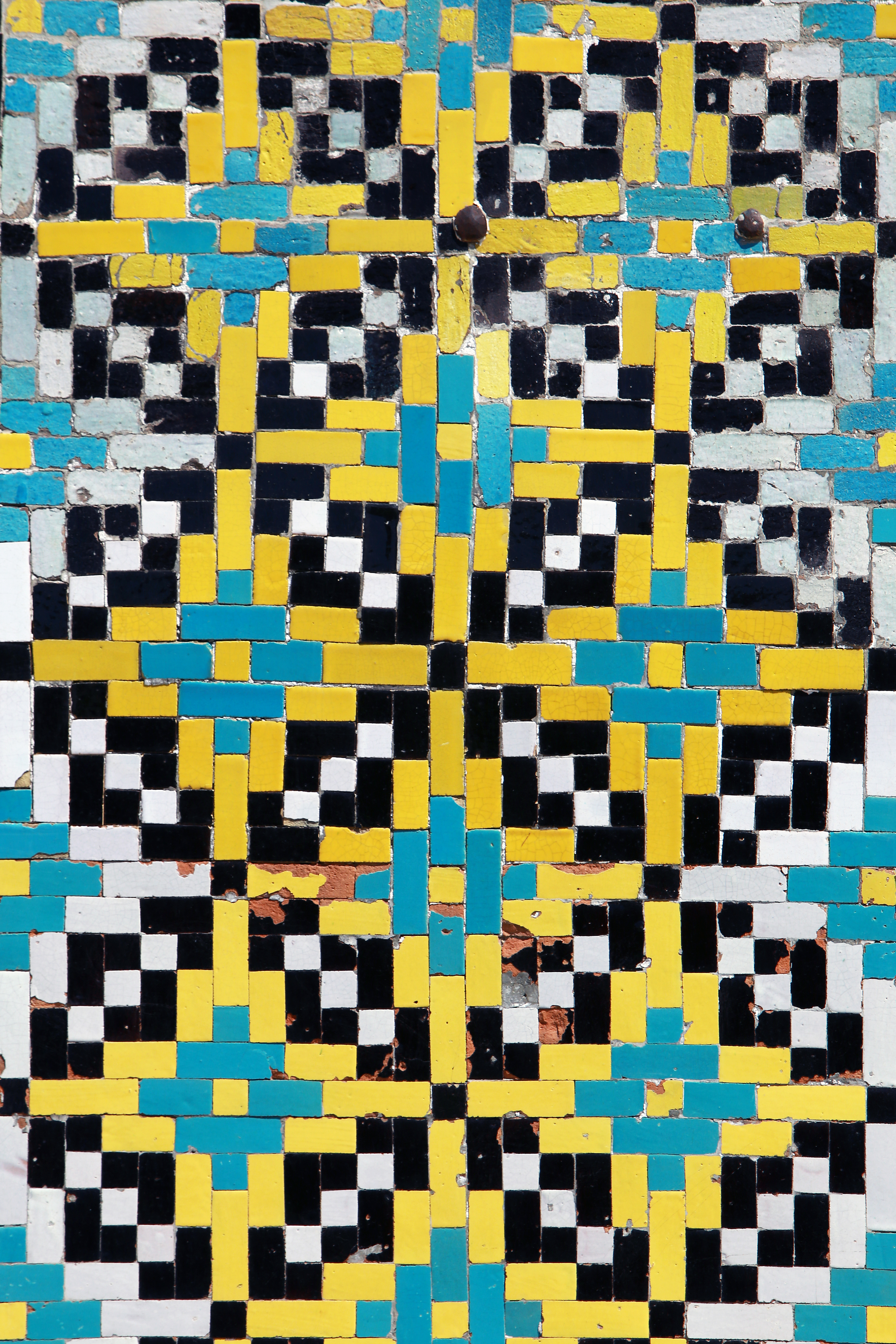
Details
