= Darb Kushk Gate =

Historic gate in Qazvin, Iran

Coordinates: 36°16′46″N 50°00′14″E

Darb-e Kushk Gate دروازه درب کوشک
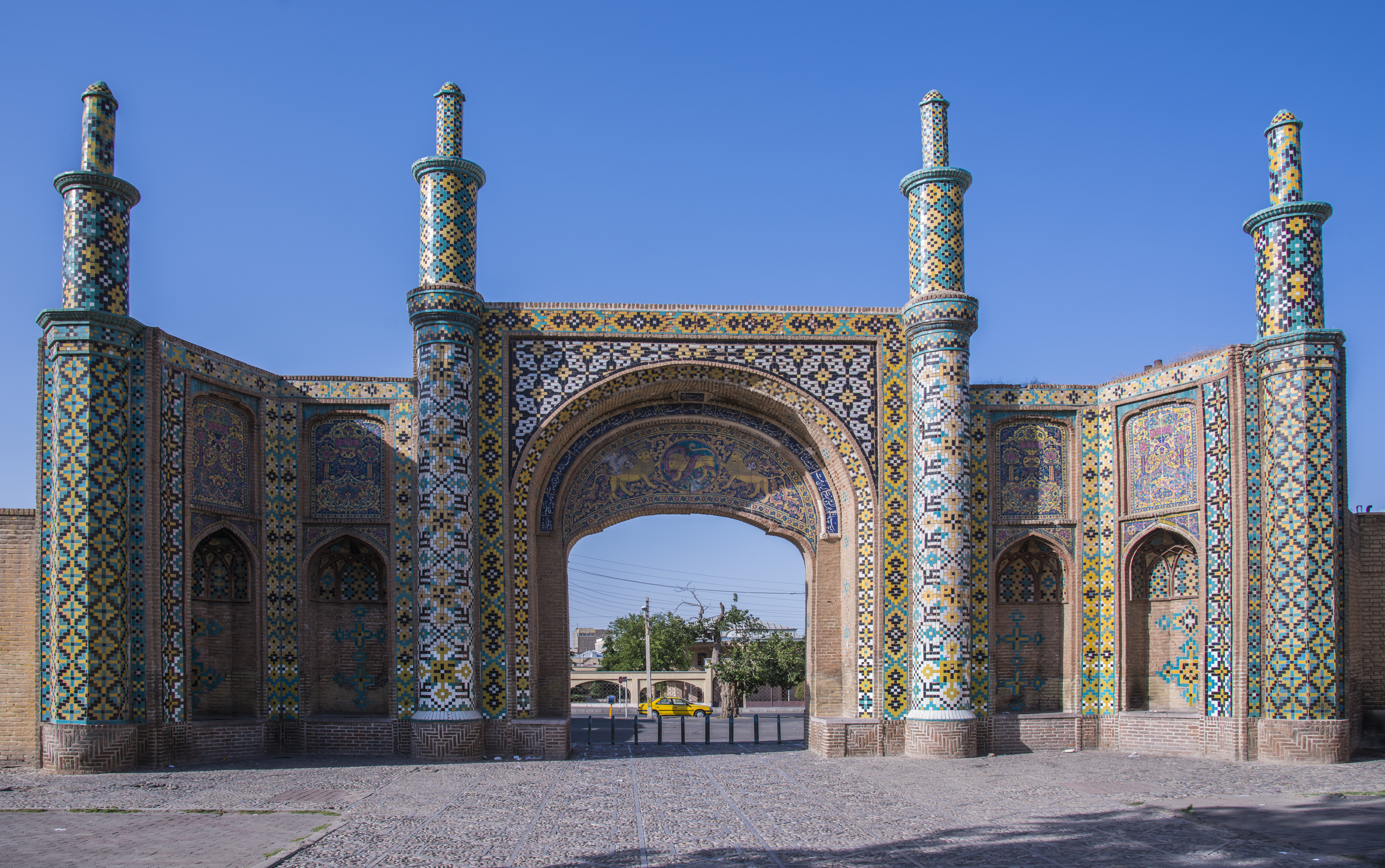
- Interactive map of Darb-e Kushk Gate دروازه درب کوشک

History
- Built: Qajar era

Iran National Heritage List
- Official name: Darb-e Kushk Gate
- Type: Gate
- Designated: 1955
- Reference no.: 391
- Conservation organization: Cultural Heritage, Handicrafts and Tourism Organization of Iran

The Darb-e Kushk Gate (Persian: دروازه درب کوشک) is a historic gate in Qazvin, Iran. It is one of the only 2 remaining city gates of Qazvin, the other being the Tehran gate.

It was repaired and retiled in 1879 during the reign of Naser al-Din Shah Qajar and when Azd ol-molk Qazvini was the governor of Qazvin.

== Gallery ==
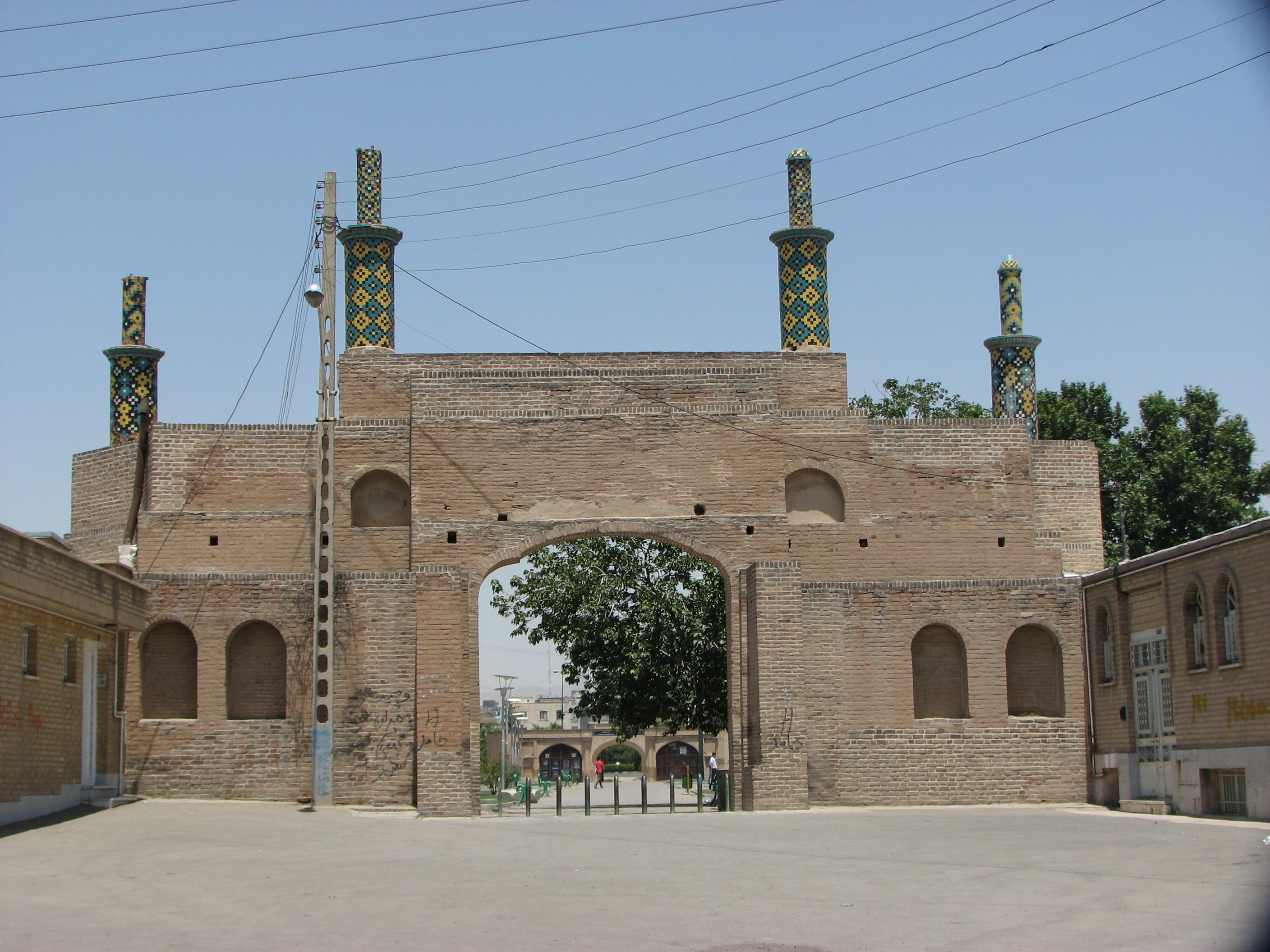
rear view

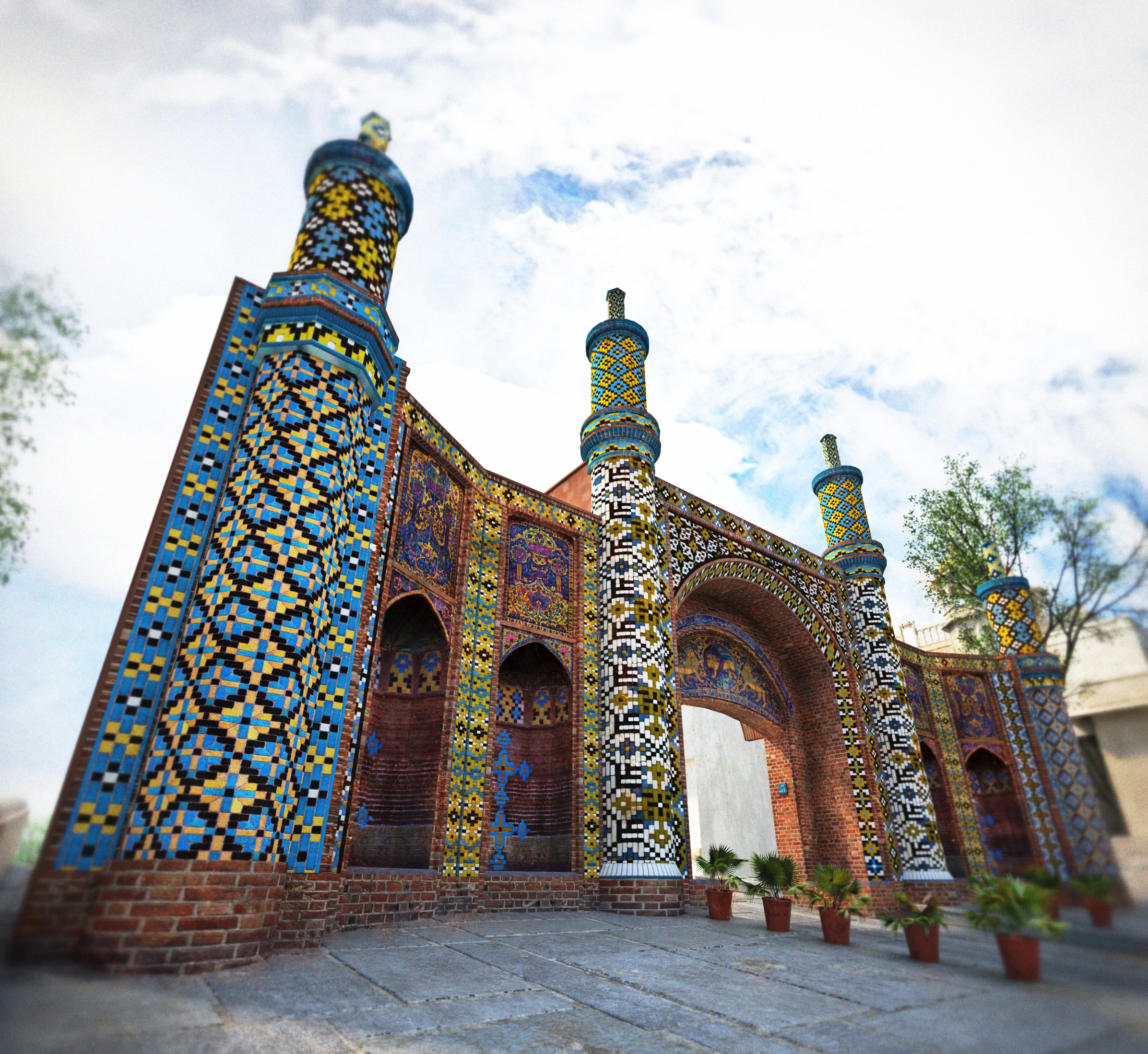

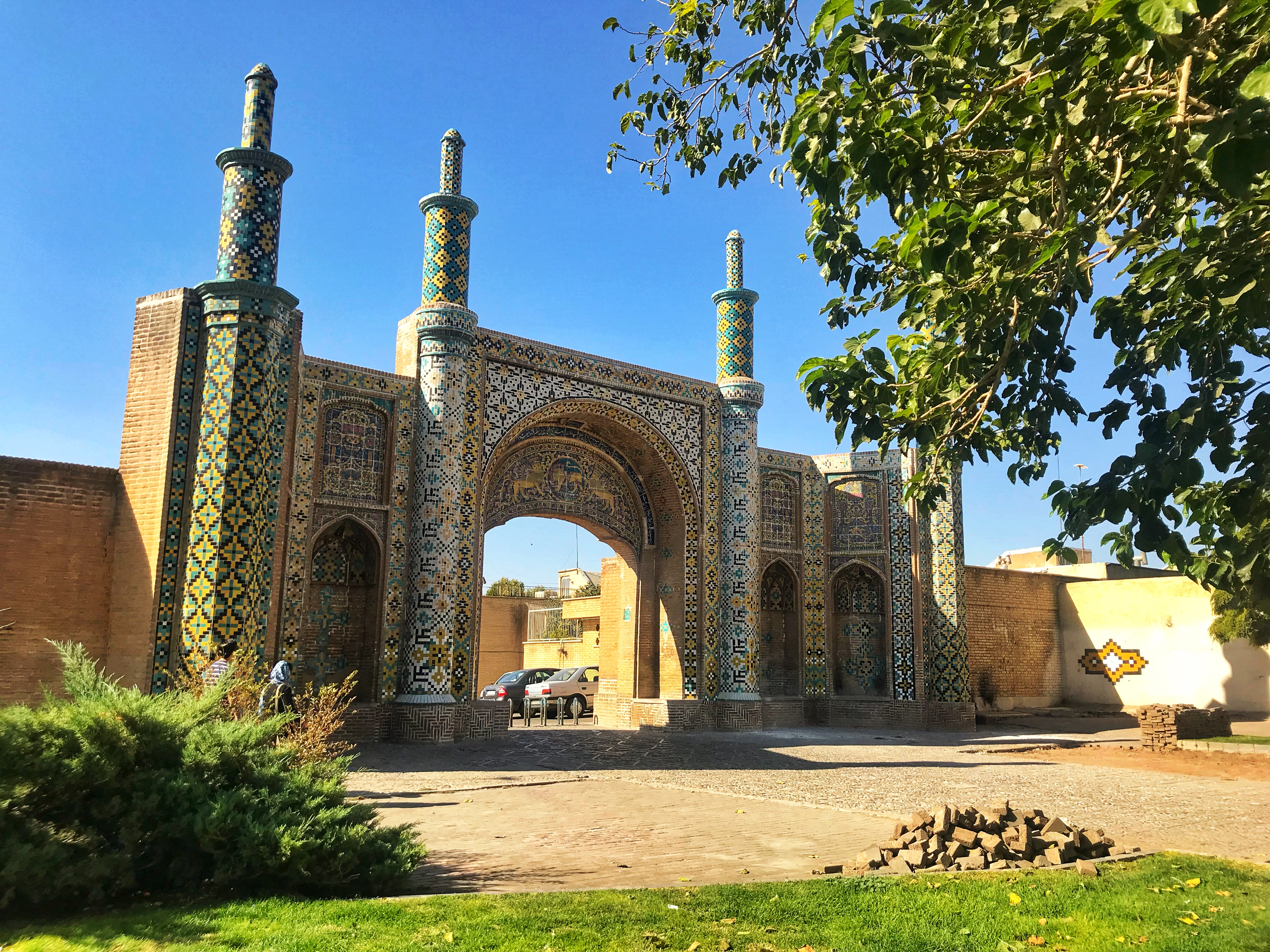
