= Segonbad =

Historic structure in Urmia, Iran

Coordinates: 37°32′36″N 45°04′35″E

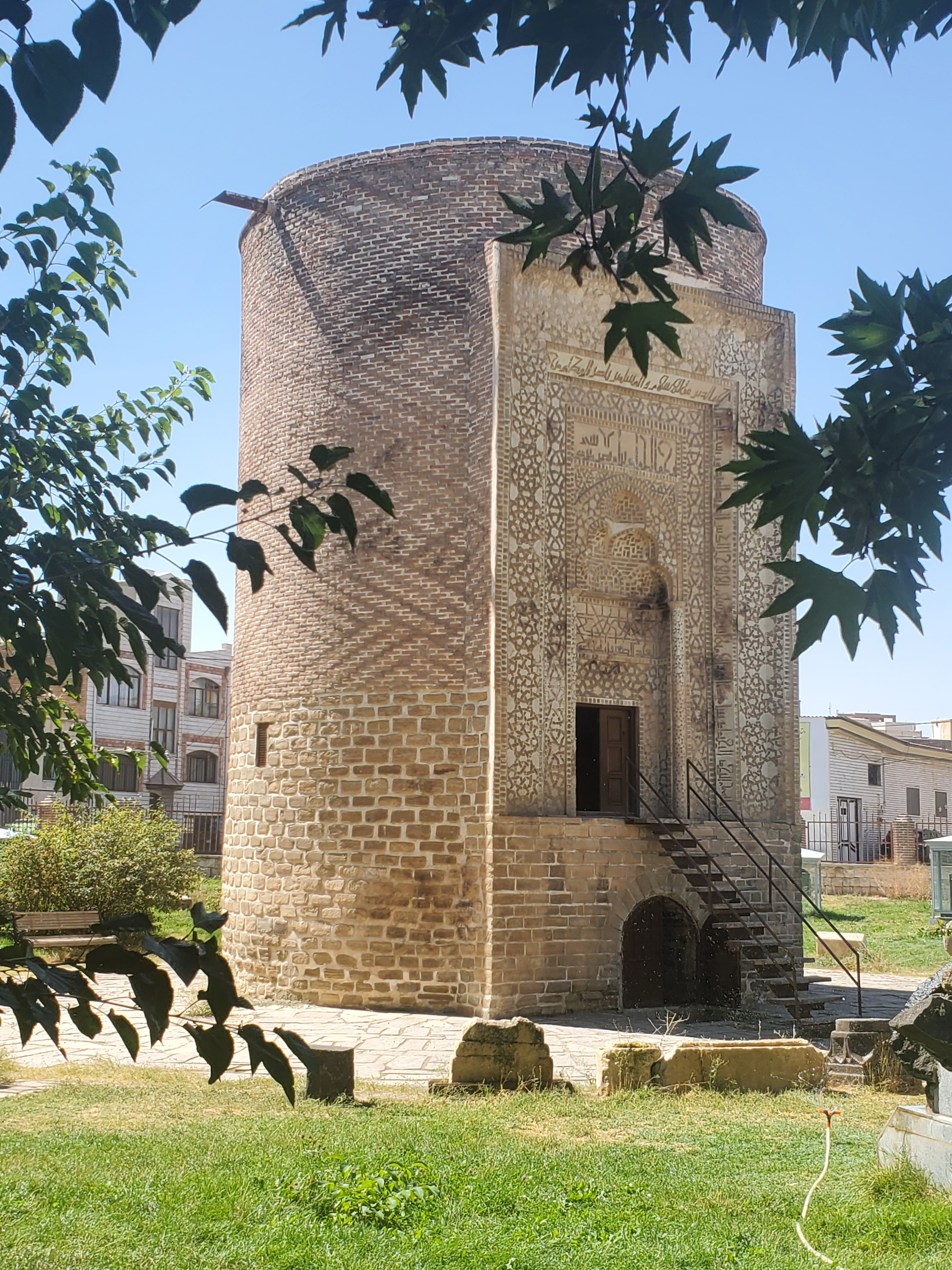
- Interactive map of the Segonbad area

General information
- Location: Urmia, Iran

Segonbad (Persian: سه‌گنبد, lit. 'Three Domes') is a historic structure located in Urmia, northwestern Iran. The monument has three inscriptions in the Kufic script placed on the entrance door. Segonbad is a remnant of the Seljuk era.

== Building ==
The current building has two floors and there are vents on all four sides. The first floor is called the crypt, which has an arched cover and is thus separated from the second floor.

== Gallery ==
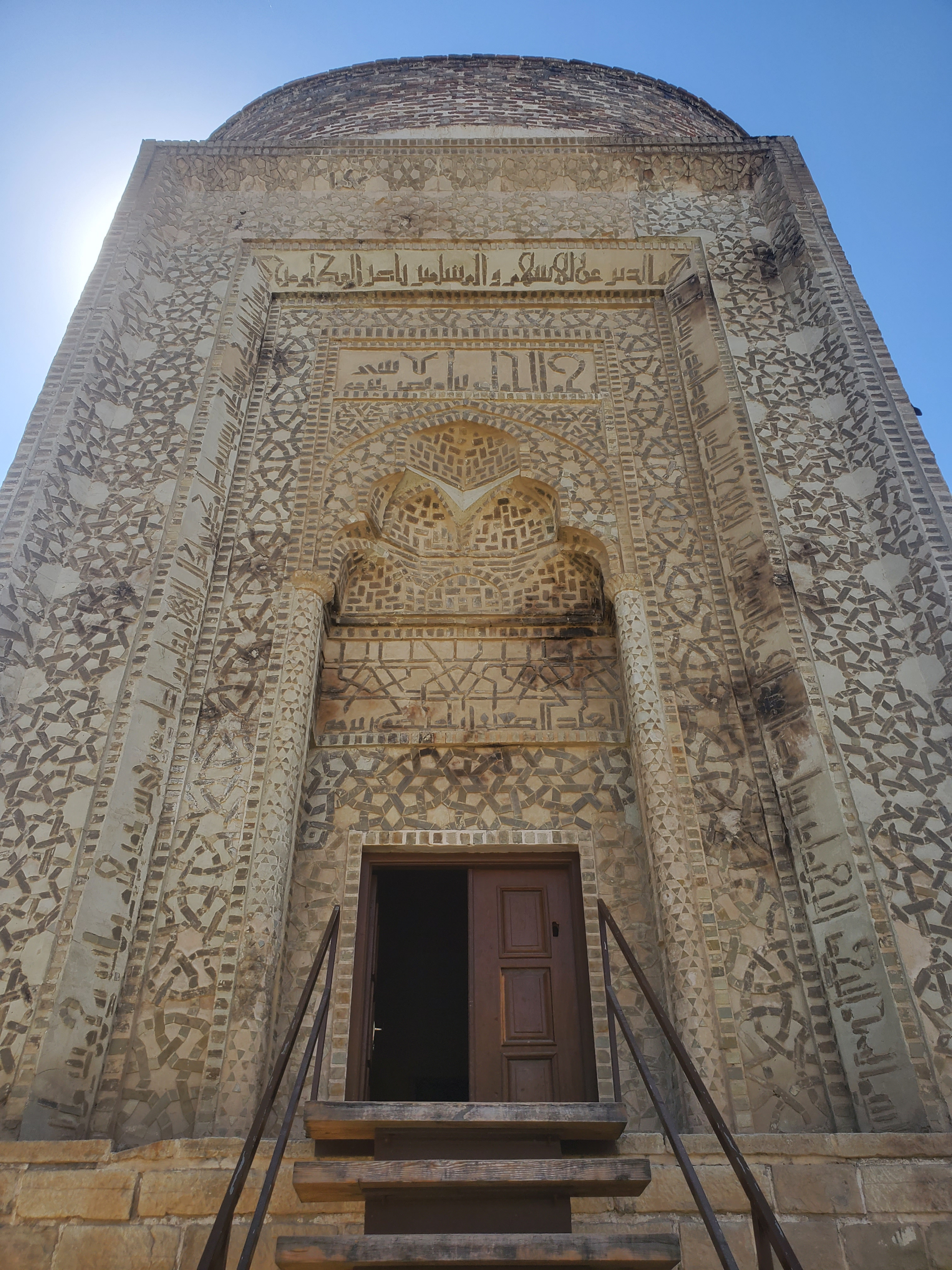
Entrance

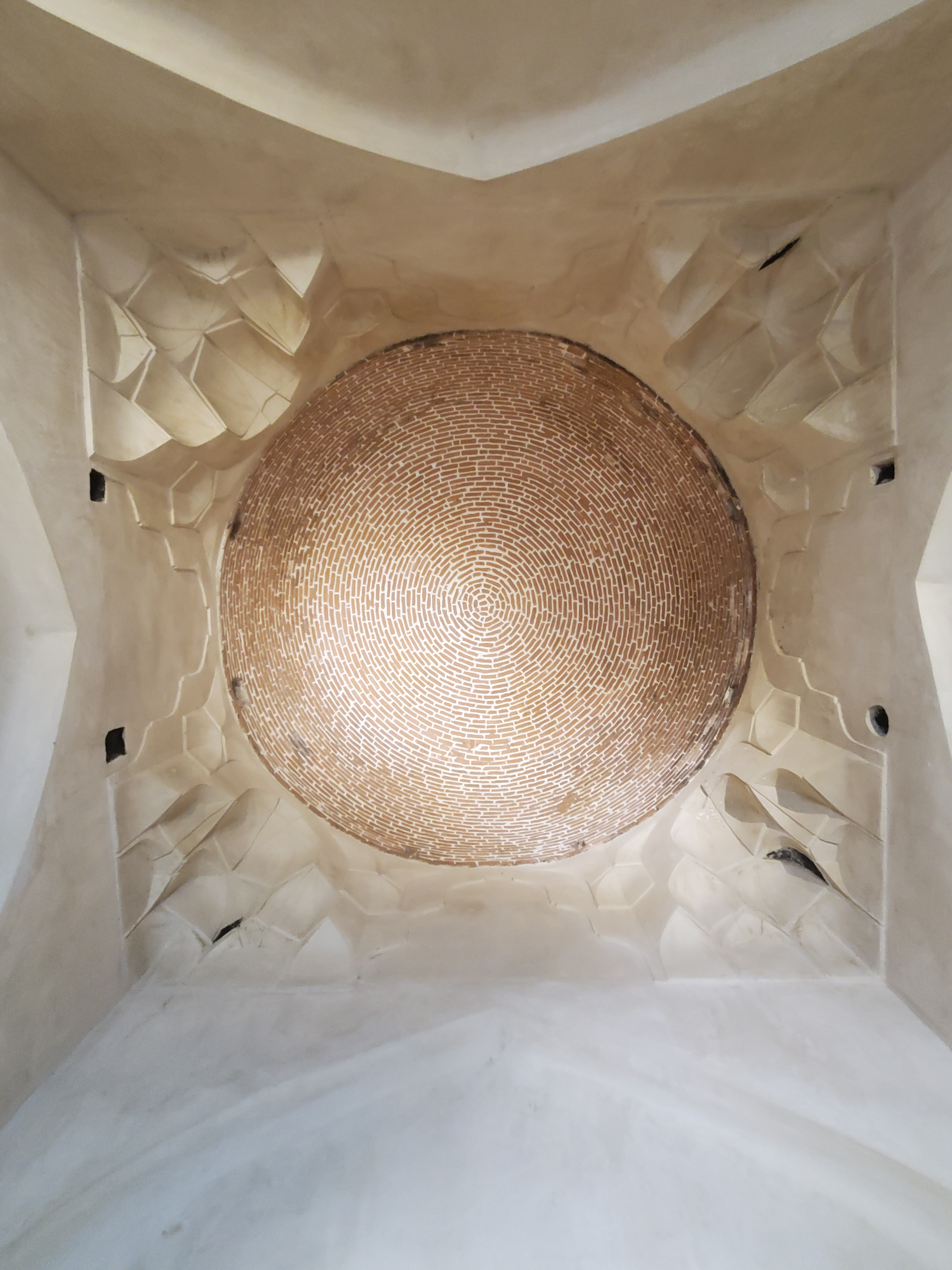
Muqarnas on the Ceiling
