= Moinabad =

Moinabad (Persian: معين اباد) may refer to:

== India ==
- Moinabad, Ranga Reddy district, a town in Telangana
- Moinabad mandal, Ranga Reddy district

== Iran ==
- Moinabad, Fasa, a village in Fasa County, Fars Province
- Moinabad, Kazerun, a village in Kazerun County, Fars Province
- Moinabad, Ardestan, a village in Ardestan County, Isfahan Province
- Moinabad, Nain, a village in Nain County, Isfahan Province
- Moinabad, Divandarreh, a village in Divandarreh County, Kurdistan Province
- Moinabad, Sanandaj, a village in Sanandaj County, Kurdistan Province
- Moinabad, Markazi, a village in Tafresh County, Markazi Province
- Moinabad-e Bala, a village in Mashhad County, Razavi Khorasan Province
- Moinabad-e Sofla, a village in Mashhad County, Razavi Khorasan Province
- Moinabad, Semnan, a village in Damghan County, Semnan Province
- Moinabad, South Khorasan, a village in Zirkuh County, South Khorasan Province
- Moinabad, Tehran, a village in Pishva County, Tehran Province

== Pakistan ==
- Moinabad, Karachi, a neighbourhood in Karachi
