= Moeen =

Moeen or Moein or Moien is a given name and surname. It is a Quranic name which means: helper, supporter, or provider of refuge.

Notable persons with the name include:

== Persons with the given name ==
- Moeen U Ahmed (born 1953), Bangladeshi military officer
- Moeen Akhtar (1950–2011), Pakistani actor and comedian
- Moeen Ali (born 1987), English cricketer
- Moeen Charif (born 1972), Lebanese singer
- Moeen Faruqi (born 1958), Pakistani writer
- Moeen Marastial (born 1950), Afghan politician
- Moeen Nizami (born 1965), Pakistani Urdu poet
- Moein (singer) (born 1951), Iranian singer
- Moein Abbasian (born 1989), Iranian football player
- Moein Al Bastaki (born 1980), Emirati television presenter
- Moein Moghimi, British biochemist and nanoscientist
- Moein Rahimi (born 1989), Iranian volleyball player
- Moein Taghavi (born 1990), Iranian wushu athlete
- Moeenuddin Ahmad Qureshi (1930–2016), Pakistani economist and politician

== Persons with the surname ==
- Ali Moeen (born 1968), Pakistani dramatist and lyricist
- Mohammad Moeen (1914–1971), Iranian scholar of Persian literature and Iranology
- Mostafa Moeen (born 1951), Iranian politician

== See also ==
- Moin (disambiguation)
