= Jalayer =

Jalayer (Persian: جلاير) may refer to:

- Jalayer, Ardabil, a village in Iran
- Jalayer, East Azerbaijan, a village in Iran
- Jalayer, Shazand, a village in Markazi Province, Iran
- Jalayer, Tafresh, a village in Markazi Province, Iran
- Jalayer (surname)
