= Tararan-e Bala =

Village in Markazi province, Iran

Tararan-e Bala Persian: تراران بالا
- Village
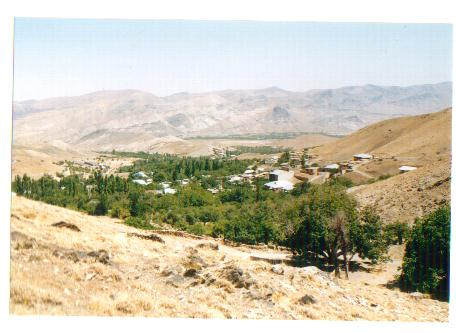
- The village of Tararan-e Bala

- Location within Iran
- Coordinates: 34°42′17″N 49°56′52″E
- Country: Iran
- Province: Markazi
- County: Tafresh
- District: Central
- Rural District: Bazarjan

Population (2016)
  - Total: 67
- Time zone: UTC+3:30 (IRST)

Tararan-e Bala (Persian: تراران بالا) (Note: Also romanized as Tarārān-e ‘Bālā and Ţarārān-e Bālā; formerly known as Delaram (دلارام); also known as Tararan (تراران), also romanized as Tarārān) is a village in Bazarjan Rural District of the Central District in Tafresh County, Markazi province, Iran.

Tararan-e Bala is a summer resort and its main cultivation is walnut. The village has an old, lush field called dasht (field) which is popular among many urban people who know the area and is used as a strolling area. Remains of a very old mill are buried on the way to the dasht.

== Demographics ==
=== Language ===
The language of the village was in older times a kind of dialect from the Central Iranian languages but it had disappeared some time ago and the current language is standard Persian. Traces of the old dialect are to be found in the speech of some older residents. In the past, a large number of Iranian courtiers and calligraphers were from the Tafresh and Ashtian regions.

=== Population ===
At the time of the 2006 National Census, the village's population was 68 in 30 households. The following census in 2011 counted 111 people in 44 households. The 2016 census measured the population of the village as 67 people in 31 households.

== Migration ==
A high percentage of the people of Tararan-e Bala have migrated to Tehran over time, and many still visit the village during the ceremonies of Ashura for watching the traditional ta'ziyeh plays The focus of Tafreshi migrants to Tehran was at the beginning the neighborhoods around the Mokhtari crossroad with the Shahpour Street (today's Vahdat-e Eslami). The Tafreshi Mosque is still located nearby.

== Higher education ==
Between the village of Moinabad, to the east of Tararan-e Bala, and Tafresh lies the Tafresh Azad University.

== See also ==
Media related to Tararan-e Bala at Wikimedia Commons
