= Karyan, Markazi =

Village in Markazi province, Iran

Karyan Persian: كريان
- Village
- Location within Iran
- Coordinates: 34°49′02″N 49°52′15″E
- Country: Iran
- Province: Markazi
- County: Tafresh
- District: Central
- Rural District: Bazarjan

Population (2016)
  - Total: 242
- Time zone: UTC+3:30 (IRST)

Karyan (Persian: كريان) (Note: Also romanized as Karyān; also known as Kharīān, Kūreyān, Kūrīān, and Kūrīyān) is a village in Bazarjan Rural District of the Central District in Tafresh County, Markazi province, Iran.

== Demographics ==
=== Population ===
At the time of the 2006 National Census, the village's population was 320 in 88 households. The following census in 2011 counted 294 people in 93 households. The 2016 census measured the population of the village as 242 people in 78 households.
