= Saeedeh Ghods =

Iranian author, entrepreneur and philanthropist

- Saeedeh Ghods in 2019
- Born: 1951 (age 74–75); Shemiran, Tehran, Iran
- Education: university of Tehran
- Occupations: Author entrepreneur philanthropist
- Known for: founder of Mahak
- Spouse: Nader Sharifi
- Children: Mehrbod; Kiana

Saeedeh Ghods (Persian: سعیده قدس born 1951, Tehran) is an Iranian author, philanthropist, and entrepreneur who founded the Mahak charity organization for children with cancer.

== Life and education ==
She holds a bachelor's degree in Geography (with a specialization in Political Geography) from the University of Tehran. After completing her undergraduate studies, she began working as a planning and budget specialist at the Iranian Tobacco Company. During this period, she passed the master's degree entrance exam and continued her studies in urban sociology while employed by the Plan and Budget Organization. Several years later she began working as an international relations specialist at the Ministry of Industries and Mines.

== Marriage and life abroad ==
At the age of 23 Ghods married Nader Sharifi, an employee of the Ministry of Foreign Affairs. Through this marriage she lived abroad for several years, including in Pakistan and Germany, where she pursued further studies in German language and literature at Humboldt University of Berlin. Her first child, Mehrbod, was born in Germany. Seven years later, her second child, Kiana, was born in Iran. Following Kiana's birth, Ghods resigned from her job, feeling unable to balance her career with raising two children.

== Motivation and founding of mahak ==
Ghods' motivation to establish Mahak stemmed from her personal experience with her daughter's illness. Two years after Kiana's birth, Ghods discovered that Kiana had a kidney tumor requiring immediate surgery. During the years she spent caring for Kiana through treatment, Ghods witnessed the hardships faced by other families of children with cancer, particularly those from low-income backgrounds who struggled to afford treatment. She vowed that if her daughter recovered, she would dedicate herself to helping families of children with cancer who lacked the financial means to pursue treatment. Kiana's cancer was diagnosed early and she recovered, though she endured considerable suffering from intensive chemotherapy. Through subsequent research, ghods concluded that the primary obstacle facing families of children with cancer in Iran was the high cost of treatment, and that raising funds from the public and donors could substantially address this problem. This realization led her to found Mahak in autumn 1991.

== Expansion to a hospital ==
Mahak purchased a 4,400-square-meter plot of land from the Tehran Municipality in the Darabad district to expand its physical facilities. Initially the plan was to build a residence on the site for families who traveled to Tehran from across Iran for their children's treatment. However, as construction began, Mahak was introduced to a philanthropist who intended to establish a cancer treatment center, motivated by his wife's own battle with cancer. As a result, the project was changed from a three-story residence to a six-story hospital with a capacity of 100 beds. This led to the opening of Mahak Hospital and Rehabilitation Complex in 2001.

== Works ==
• Kimia Khatoon. Tehran: Nashr-e Cheshmeh, Winter 2004/2005 (1383 SH); 4th printing 2005/2006 (1384 SH).

== Media ==
In November 2017 a documentary film titled: بنیان‌گذار محک (The Founder of Mahak), directed by Mohsen Abdolvahab was produced; the film explores the life and activities of Saeedeh Ghods, the founder of the "Mahak Society to Support Children Suffering from Cancer."
