= Naqusan =

Village in Markazi province, Iran

Naqusan Persian: نقوسان
- Village
- Location within Iran
- Coordinates: 34°43′55″N 49°53′23″E
- Country: Iran
- Province: Markazi
- County: Tafresh
- District: Central
- Rural District: Bazarjan

Population (2016)
  - Total: 233
- Time zone: UTC+3:30 (IRST)

Naqusan (Persian: نقوسان) (Note: Also romanized as Naqūsān and Neqūsān; also known as Naghoosan, Nāqūsān, and Naqūshan) is a village in Bazarjan Rural District of the Central District in Tafresh County, Markazi province, Iran.

== Demographics ==
=== Population ===
At the time of the 2006 National Census, the village's population was 316 in 149 households. The following census in 2011 counted 284 people in 133 households. The 2016 census measured the population of the village as 233 people in 110 households.
