= Gazavand =

Village in Markazi province, Iran

Gazavand Persian: گزاوند
- Village
- Location within Iran
- Coordinates: 35°00′36″N 49°39′37″E
- Country: Iran
- Province: Markazi
- County: Tafresh
- District: Central
- Rural District: Rudbar

Population (2016)
  - Total: 168
- Time zone: UTC+3:30 (IRST)

Gazavand (Persian: گزاوند) (Note: Also romanized as Gazāvand) is a village in Rudbar Rural District of the Central District in Tafresh County, Markazi province, Iran.

== Demographics ==
=== Population ===
At the time of the 2006 National Census, the village's population was 205 in 51 households. The following census in 2011 counted 171 people in 60 households. The 2016 census measured the population of the village as 168 people in 59 households.
