= Fesengan =

Village in Markazi province, Iran

Fesengan Persian: فسنگان
- Village
- Location within Iran
- Coordinates: 34°46′52″N 49°51′13″E
- Country: Iran
- Province: Markazi
- County: Tafresh
- District: Central
- Rural District: Rudbar

Population (2016)
  - Total: 160
- Time zone: UTC+3:30 (IRST)

Fesengan (Persian: فسنگان) (Note: Also romanized as Fesengān; also known as Fesenjān) is a village in Rudbar Rural District of the Central District in Tafresh County, Markazi province, Iran.

== Demographics ==
=== Population ===
At the time of the 2006 National Census, the village's population was 254 in 80 households. The following census in 2011 counted 182 people in 68 households. The 2016 census measured the population of the village as 160 people in 65 households.
