= Qarah Jaqayah =

Village in Markazi province, Iran

Qarah Jaqayah Persian: قره جاقيه
- Village
- Location within Iran
- Coordinates: 34°56′10″N 49°34′44″E
- Country: Iran
- Province: Markazi
- County: Tafresh
- District: Central
- Rural District: Rudbar

Population (2016)
  - Total: 191
- Time zone: UTC+3:30 (IRST)

Qarah Jaqayah (Persian: قره جاقيه) (Note: Also romanized as Qarā Jāqayah; also known as Qarājeh Qeyeh) is a village in Rudbar Rural District of the Central District in Tafresh County, Markazi province, Iran.

== Demographics ==
=== Population ===
At the time of the 2006 National Census, the village's population was 129 in 44 households. The following census in 2011 counted 114 people in 36 households. The 2016 census measured the population of the village as 191 people in 62 households.
