= Bazarjan =

Village in Markazi province, Iran

Bazarjan Persian: بازرجان
- Village
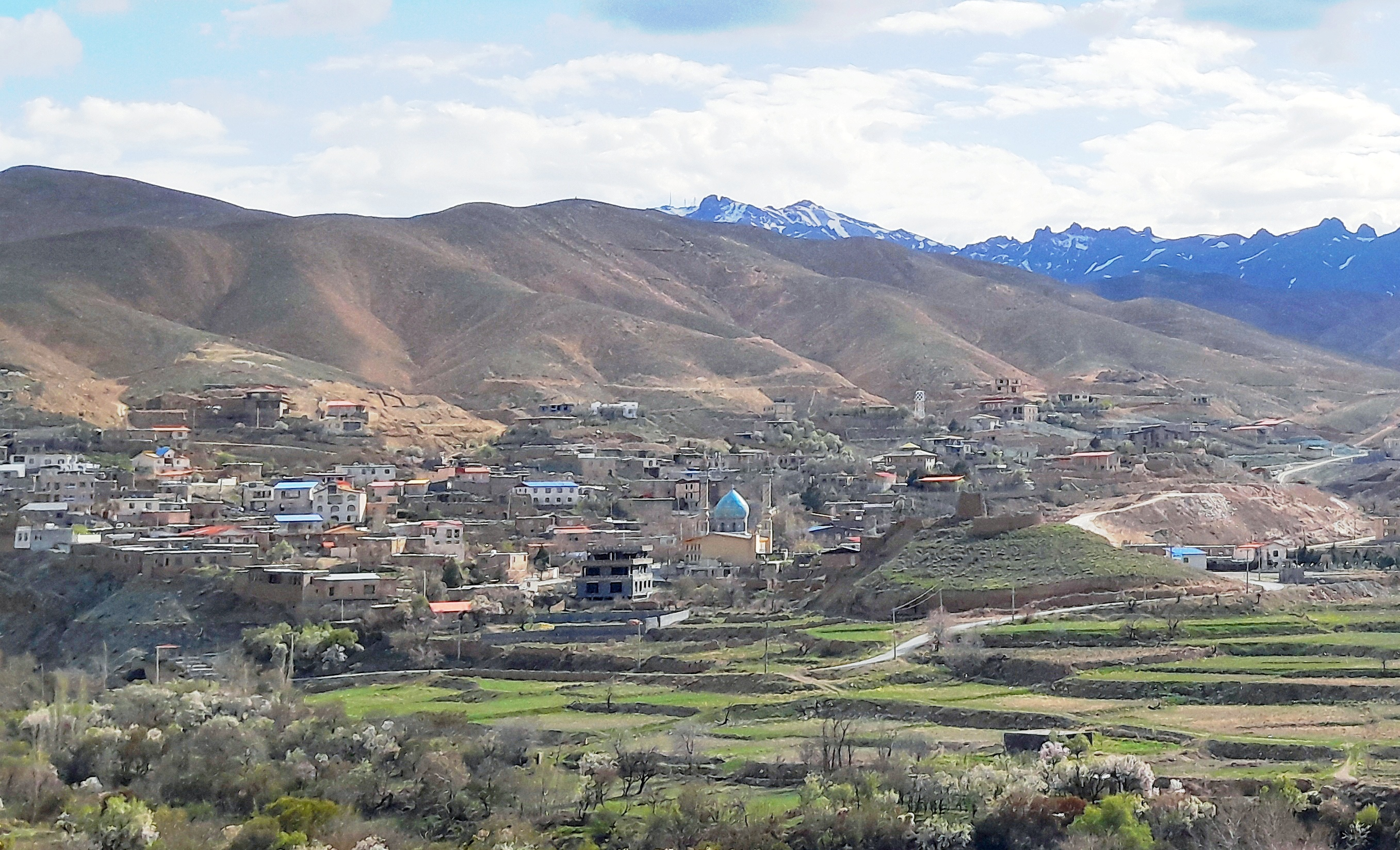
- The village of Bazarjan

- Location within Iran
- Coordinates: 34°47′00″N 49°55′33″E
- Country: Iran
- Province: Markazi
- County: Tafresh
- District: Central
- Rural District: Bazarjan

Population (2016)
  - Total: 172
- Time zone: UTC+3:30 (IRST)

Bazarjan (Persian: بازرجان) (Note: Also romanized as Bāzarjān, Bazerjan, and Bāzerjān; also known as Bāzrijān) is a village in, and the capital of, Bazarjan Rural District in the Central District of Tafresh County, Markazi province, Iran.

== Demographics ==
=== Population ===
At the time of the 2006 National Census, the village's population was 136 in 48 households. The following census in 2011 counted 144 people in 56 households. The 2016 census measured the population of the village as 172 people in 68 households.

== See also ==
- Borzeh, a mountain near Bazarjan
