= Kohlu, Iran =

Kohlu or Kahloo or Koholu (Persian: كهلو) in Iran, may refer to:

- Kohlu-ye Olya
- Kohlu-ye Sofla
