= Farak, Tafresh =

Village in Markazi province, Iran

Farak Persian: فرك
- Village
- Location within Iran
- Coordinates: 34°47′02″N 49°48′50″E
- Country: Iran
- Province: Markazi
- County: Tafresh
- District: Central
- Rural District: Rudbar

Population (2016)
  - Total: 227
- Time zone: UTC+3:30 (IRST)

Farak (Persian: فرك) (Note: Also romanized as Fark and Fork) is a village in Rudbar Rural District of the Central District in Tafresh County, Markazi province, Iran.

== Demographics ==
=== Population ===
At the time of the 2006 National Census, the village's population was 312 in 118 households. The following census in 2011 counted 310 people in 111 households. The 2016 census measured the population of the village as 227 people in 102 households.
