= Abrahdar =

Village in Markazi province, Iran

Abrahdar Persian: ابره در
- Village
- Location within Iran
- Coordinates: 34°47′54″N 50°07′25″E
- Country: Iran
- Province: Markazi
- County: Tafresh
- District: Central
- Rural District: Kharrazan

Population (2016)
  - Total: 133
- Time zone: UTC+3:30 (IRST)

Abrahdar (Persian: ابره در) (Note: Also romanized as Abrehdar; also known as Ābardarreh, Abradar, and Abredar) is a village in Kharrazan Rural District of the Central District in Tafresh County, Markazi province, Iran.

== Demographics ==
=== Population ===
At the time of the 2006 National Census, the village's population was 215 in 101 households. The following census in 2011 counted 229 people in 111 households. The 2016 census measured the population of the village as 133 people in 77 households.
