= Shahr Ab, Markazi =

Village in Markazi province, Iran

Shahr Ab Persian: شهراب
- Village
- Location within Iran
- Coordinates: 34°35′30″N 49°53′46″E
- Country: Iran
- Province: Markazi
- County: Tafresh
- District: Central
- Rural District: Kuh Panah

Population (2016)
  - Total: 389
- Time zone: UTC+3:30 (IRST)

Shahr Ab (Persian: شهراب) (Note: Also romanized as Shahr Āb, Shahrab, Shahrāb, and Shehrāb) is a village in, and the capital of, Kuh Panah Rural District in the Central District of Tafresh County, Markazi province, Iran.

== Demographics ==
=== Population ===
At the time of the 2006 National Census, the village's population was 471 in 177 households. The following census in 2011 counted 459 people in 184 households. The 2016 census measured the population of the village as 389 people in 172 households, the most populous in its rural district.
