= Joftan =

Village in Markazi province, Iran

Joftan Persian: جفتان
- Village
- Location within Iran
- Coordinates: 34°50′09″N 49°45′09″E
- Country: Iran
- Province: Markazi
- County: Tafresh
- District: Central
- Rural District: Rudbar

Population (2016)
  - Total: 382
- Time zone: UTC+3:30 (IRST)

Joftan (Persian: جفتان) (Note: Also romanized as Jaftān and Joftān; also known as Jaghtān) is a village in, and the capital of, Rudbar Rural District in the Central District of Tafresh County, Markazi province, Iran.

== Demographics ==
=== Population ===
At the time of the 2006 National Census, the village's population was 182 in 73 households. The following census in 2011 counted 199 people in 84 households. The 2016 census measured the population of the village as 382 people in 154 households, the most populous in its rural district.
