= Kangaran =

Village in Markazi province, Iran

Kangaran Persian: كنگران
- Village
- Location within Iran
- Coordinates: 34°37′09″N 49°51′41″E
- Country: Iran
- Province: Markazi
- County: Tafresh
- District: Central
- Rural District: Kuh Panah

Population (2016)
  - Total: 133
- Time zone: UTC+3:30 (IRST)

Kangaran (Persian: كنگران) (Note: Also romanized as Kangarān) is a village in Kuh Panah Rural District of the Central District in Tafresh County, Markazi province, Iran.

== Demographics ==
=== Population ===
At the time of the 2006 National Census, the village's population was 182 in 70 households. The following census in 2011 counted 169 people in 70 households. The 2016 census measured the population of the village as 133 people in 60 households.
