= Dinjerd =

Village in Markazi province, Iran

Dinjerd Persian: دينجرد
- Village
- Location within Iran
- Coordinates: 34°42′15″N 49°59′07″E
- Country: Iran
- Province: Markazi
- County: Tafresh
- District: Central
- Rural District: Bazarjan

Population (2016)
  - Total: 224
- Time zone: UTC+3:30 (IRST)

Dinjerd (Persian: دينجرد) (Note: Also romanized as Dīnjerd; also known as Banī Gerd, Danījerd, Dīnehgerd, and Dīnerjed) is a village in Bazarjan Rural District of the Central District in Tafresh County, Markazi province, Iran.

== Demographics ==
=== Population ===
At the time of the 2006 National Census, the village's population was 73 in 28 households. The following census in 2011 counted 146 people in 23 households. The 2016 census measured the population of the village as 224 people in 63 households.
