= Haftan-e Olya =

Village in Markazi province, Iran

Haftan-e Olya Persian: هفتان عليا
- Village
- Location within Iran
- Coordinates: 34°48′26″N 49°41′23″E
- Country: Iran
- Province: Markazi
- County: Tafresh
- District: Central
- Rural District: Rudbar

Population (2016)
  - Total: 234
- Time zone: UTC+3:30 (IRST)

Haftan-e Olya (Persian: هفتان عليا) (Note: Also romanized as Haftān-e ‘Olyā and Haftān-i-‘Uliya; also known as Bābālar and Haftān-e Bālā) is a village in Rudbar Rural District of the Central District in Tafresh County, Markazi province, Iran.

== Demographics ==
=== Population ===
At the time of the 2006 National Census, the village's population was 336 in 95 households. The following census in 2011 counted 328 people in 97 households. The 2016 census measured the population of the village as 234 people in 82 households.
