= Sarabadan =

Village in Markazi province, Iran

Sarabadan Persian: سرابادان
- Village
- The village of Sarabadan

- Location within Iran
- Coordinates: 34°44′21″N 50°06′33″E
- Country: Iran
- Province: Markazi
- County: Tafresh
- District: Central
- Rural District: Kharrazan

Population (2016)
  - Total: 52
- Time zone: UTC+3:30 (IRST)

Sarabadan (Persian: سرآبادان) (Note: Also romanized as Sarābādān; also known as Sarboodoon) is a village in Kharrazan Rural District of the Central District in Tafresh County, Markazi province, Iran.

== Demographics ==
=== Population ===
At the time of the 2006 National Census, the village's population was 54 in 29 households. The following census in 2011 counted 101 people in 53 households. The 2016 census measured the population of the village as 52 people in 26 households.
