= Qasemabad, Tafresh =

Village in Markazi province, Iran

Qasemabad Persian: قاسم اباد
- Village
- Country: Iran
- Province: Markazi
- County: Tafresh
- District: Central
- Rural District: Kuh Panah

Population (2016)
  - Total: 87
- Time zone: UTC+3:30 (IRST)

Qasemabad (Persian: قاسم اباد) (Note: Also romanized as Qāsemābād; formerly known as Shah Varuq (شاه وروق)) is a village in Kuh Panah Rural District of the Central District in Tafresh County, Markazi province, Iran.

== Demographics ==
=== Population ===
At the time of the 2006 National Census, the village's population was 74 in 25 households. The following census in 2011 counted 57 people in 23 households. The 2016 census measured the population of the village as 87 people in 35 households.
