= Sarband, Markazi =

Village in Markazi province, Iran

Sarband Persian: سربند
- Village
- Location within Iran
- Coordinates: 34°35′19″N 49°51′07″E
- Country: Iran
- Province: Markazi
- County: Tafresh
- District: Central
- Rural District: Kuh Panah

Population (2016)
  - Total: 83
- Time zone: UTC+3:30 (IRST)

Sarband (Persian: سربند) (Note: Also romanized as Sar-e Band; also known as Sar Rāh Band and Sarāhband) is a village in Kuh Panah Rural District of the Central District in Tafresh County, Markazi province, Iran.

== Demographics ==
=== Population ===
At the time of the 2006 National Census, the village's population was 155 in 55 households. The following census in 2011 counted 131 people in 53 households. The 2016 census measured the population of the village as 83 people in 42 households.
