= Sefid Shaban =

Village in Markazi province, Iran

Sefid Shaban Persian: سفيدشبان
- Village
- Location within Iran
- Coordinates: 34°37′45″N 49°57′41″E
- Country: Iran
- Province: Markazi
- County: Tafresh
- District: Central
- Rural District: Kuh Panah

Population (2016)
  - Total: 86
- Time zone: UTC+3:30 (IRST)

Sefid Shaban (Persian: سفيدشبان) (Note: Also romanized as Sefīd Shabān; also known as Sefīd Shīān) is a village in Kuh Panah Rural District of the Central District in Tafresh County, Markazi province, Iran.

== Demographics ==
=== Population ===
At the time of the 2006 National Census, the village's population was 142 in 36 households. The following census in 2011 counted 111 people in 37 households. The 2016 census measured the population of the village as 86 people in 29 households.
