= Nowbahar, Markazi =

Village in Markazi province, Iran

Nowbahar Persian: نوبهار
- Village
- Location within Iran
- Coordinates: 34°47′50″N 49°50′04″E
- Country: Iran
- Province: Markazi
- County: Tafresh
- District: Central
- Rural District: Rudbar

Population (2016)
  - Total: 152
- Time zone: UTC+3:30 (IRST)

Nowbahar (Persian: نوبهار) (Note: Also romanized as Nowbahār; also known as Naubahār) is a village in Rudbar Rural District of the Central District in Tafresh County, Markazi province, Iran.

== Demographics ==
=== Population ===
At the time of the 2006 National Census, the village's population was 103 in 36 households. The following census in 2011 counted 95 people in 38 households. The 2016 census measured the population of the village as 152 people in 53 households.
