= Tararan-e Pain =

Village in Markazi province, Iran

Tararan-e Pain Persian: تراران پایین
- Village
- Location within Iran
- Coordinates: 34°42′37″N 49°57′32″E
- Country: Iran
- Province: Markazi
- County: Tafresh
- District: Central
- Rural District: Bazarjan

Population (2016)
  - Total: 87
- Time zone: UTC+3:30 (IRST)

Tararan-e Pain (Persian: تراران پایین) (Note: Formerly known as Saidiyeh (سعيديه), also romanized as Saeedīyeh and Saʿīdīyeh) is a village in Bazarjan Rural District of the Central District in Tafresh County, Markazi province, Iran.

== Demographics ==
=== Population ===
At the time of the 2006 National Census, the village's population was 69 in 25 households. The following census in 2011 counted 55 people in 21 households. The 2016 census measured the population of the village as 87 people in 46 households.
