= Farismaneh =

Village in Markazi province, Iran

Farismaneh Persian: فريسمانه
- Village
- Location within Iran
- Coordinates: 34°53′54″N 49°59′26″E
- Country: Iran
- Province: Markazi
- County: Tafresh
- District: Central
- Rural District: Kharrazan

Population (2016)
  - Total: 46
- Time zone: UTC+3:30 (IRST)

Farismaneh (Persian: فريسمانه) (Note: Also romanized as Farīsmāneh; also known as Farasmāneh, Faresmāneh, and Parsmān) is a village in Kharrazan Rural District of the Central District in Tafresh County, Markazi province, Iran.

== Demographics ==
=== Population ===
At the time of the 2006 National Census, the village's population was 102 in 41 households. The following census in 2011 counted 85 people in 30 households. The 2016 census measured the population of the village as 46 people in 19 households.
