= Dizaj, Markazi =

Village in Markazi province, Iran

Dizaj Persian: ديزج
- Village
- Location within Iran
- Coordinates: 34°49′53″N 50°06′51″E
- Country: Iran
- Province: Markazi
- County: Tafresh
- District: Central
- Rural District: Kharrazan

Population (2016)
  - Total: 64
- Time zone: UTC+3:30 (IRST)

Dizaj (Persian: ديزج) (Note: Also romanized as Dīzaj; also known as Dīzak) is a village in Kharrazan Rural District of the Central District in Tafresh County, Markazi province, Iran.

== Demographics ==
=== Population ===
At the time of the 2006 National Census, the village's population was 82 in 32 households. The following census in 2011 counted 125 people in 45 households. The 2016 census measured the population of the village as 64 people in 28 households.
