= Qezeljeh, Markazi =

Village in Markazi province, Iran

Qezeljeh Persian: قزلجه
- Village
- Location within Iran
- Coordinates: 34°46′27″N 49°52′13″E
- Country: Iran
- Province: Markazi
- County: Tafresh
- District: Central
- Rural District: Bazarjan

Population (2016)
  - Total: 289
- Time zone: UTC+3:30 (IRST)

Qezeljeh (Persian: قزلجه) (Note: Also romanized as Qezeljah; also known as Qezeljeh-ye Rūdbār and Qiziljāh) is a village in Bazarjan Rural District of the Central District in Tafresh County, Markazi province, Iran.

== Demographics ==
=== Population ===
At the time of the 2006 National Census, the village's population was 588 in 134 households. The following census in 2011 counted 443 people in 120 households. The 2016 census measured the population of the village as 289 people in 101 households.
