= Sefid Ab, Markazi =

Village in Markazi province, Iran

Sefid Ab Persian: سفيداب
- Village
- Location within Iran
- Coordinates: 34°35′10″N 49°49′42″E
- Country: Iran
- Province: Markazi
- County: Tafresh
- District: Central
- Rural District: Kuh Panah

Population (2016)
  - Total: 88
- Time zone: UTC+3:30 (IRST)

Sefid Ab (Persian: سفيداب) (Note: Also romanized as Safīd Āb and Sefīd Āb) is a village in Kuh Panah Rural District of the Central District in Tafresh County, Markazi province, Iran.

== Demographics ==
=== Population ===
At the time of the 2006 National Census, the village's population was 143 in 49 households. The following census in 2011 counted 127 people in 46 households. The 2016 census measured the population of the village as 88 people in 39 households.
