= Kahak, Tafresh =

Village in Markazi province, Iran

Kahak Persian: كهك
- Village
- Location within Iran
- Coordinates: 34°41′42″N 50°04′02″E
- Country: Iran
- Province: Markazi
- County: Tafresh
- District: Central
- Rural District: Bazarjan

Population (2016)
  - Total: 292
- Time zone: UTC+3:30 (IRST)

Kahak (Persian: كهك) (Note: Also known as Kerek) is a village in Bazarjan Rural District of the Central District in Tafresh County, Markazi province, Iran.

== Demographics ==
=== Language ===
Tati is the main language of Kahak.

=== Population ===
At the time of the 2006 National Census, the village's population was 360 in 124 households. The following census in 2011 counted 326 people in 106 households. The 2016 census measured the population of the village as 292 people in 110 households, the most populous in its rural district.
