= Darestan, Markazi =

Village in Markazi province, Iran

Darestan Persian: دارستان
- Village
- Location within Iran
- Coordinates: 34°33′33″N 49°48′27″E
- Country: Iran
- Province: Markazi
- County: Tafresh
- District: Central
- Rural District: Kuh Panah

Population (2016)
  - Total: 111
- Time zone: UTC+3:30 (IRST)

Darestan (Persian: دارستان) (Note: Also romanized as Dārestān; also known as Daristān) is a village in Kuh Panah Rural District of the Central District in Tafresh County, Markazi province, Iran.

== Demographics ==
=== Population ===
At the time of the 2006 National Census, the village's population was 133 in 47 households. The following census in 2011 counted 110 people in 45 households. The 2016 census measured the population of the village as 111 people in 47 households.
