= Kharrazan =

Village in Markazi province, Iran

Kharrazan Persian: خرازان
- Village
- Location within Iran
- Coordinates: 34°46′14″N 50°03′13″E
- Country: Iran
- Province: Markazi
- County: Tafresh
- District: Central
- Rural District: Kharrazan

Population (2016)
  - Total: 40
- Time zone: UTC+3:30 (IRST)

Kharrazan (Persian: خرازان) (Note: Also romanized as Kharāzān and Kharrāzān; also known as Khurāzān) is a village in Kharrazan Rural District of the Central District in Tafresh County, Markazi province, Iran.

== Demographics ==
=== Population ===
At the time of the 2006 National Census, the village's population was 47 in 24 households. The following census in 2011 counted 90 people in 37 households. The 2016 census measured the population of the village as 40 people in 23 households.
