= Kukan, Iran =

Village in Markazi province, Iran

Kukan Persian: كوكان
- Village
- Location within Iran
- Coordinates: 34°42′22″N 50°00′52″E
- Country: Iran
- Province: Markazi
- County: Tafresh
- District: Central
- Rural District: Bazarjan

Population (2016)
  - Total: 226
- Time zone: UTC+3:30 (IRST)

Kukan (Persian: كوكان) (Note: Also romanized as Kūkān) is a village in Bazarjan Rural District of the Central District in Tafresh County, Markazi province, Iran.

== Demographics ==
=== Population ===
At the time of the 2006 National Census, the village's population was 152 in 46 households. The following census in 2011 counted 172 people in 54 households. The 2016 census measured the population of the village as 226 people in 53 households.
