= Kandej =

Village in Markazi province, Iran

Kandej Persian: كندج
- Village
- Location within Iran
- Coordinates: 34°52′11″N 50°02′50″E
- Country: Iran
- Province: Markazi
- County: Tafresh
- District: Central
- Rural District: Kharrazan

Population (2016)
  - Total: 137
- Time zone: UTC+3:30 (IRST)

Kandej (Persian: كندج) (Note: Also romanized as Kandaj and Kondaj; also known as Kandījh and Kanj) is a village in Kharrazan Rural District of the Central District in Tafresh County, Markazi province, Iran.

== Demographics ==
=== Population ===
At the time of the 2006 National Census, the village's population was 209 in 88 households. The following census in 2011 counted 171 people in 84 households. The 2016 census measured the population of the village as 137 people in 68 households.
