= Kuh Panah Rural District =

Rural district in Markazi province, Iran

Kuh Panah Rural District Persian: دهستان كوه پناه
- Rural District
- Location within Iran
- Coordinates: 34°36′N 49°53′E
- Country: Iran
- Province: Markazi
- County: Tafresh
- District: Central
- Established: 1993
- Capital: Shahr Ab

Population (2016)
  - Total: 1,114
- Time zone: UTC+3:30 (IRST)

Kuh Panah Rural District (Persian: دهستان كوه پناه) is in the Central District of Tafresh County, Markazi province, Iran. Its capital is the village of Shahr Ab.

== Demographics ==
=== Population ===
At the time of the 2006 National Census, the rural district's population was 1,487 in 518 households. There were 1,334 inhabitants in 519 households at the following census of 2011. The 2016 census measured the population of the rural district as 1,114 in 473 households. The most populous of its 11 villages was Shahr Ab, with 389 people.

=== Other villages in the rural district ===
- Darestan
- Kangaran
- Kasheh
- Qasemabad
- Sarband
- Sefid Ab
- Sefid Shaban
