= Kondaj =

Kondaj may refer to:

- Kandej (Persian: كندج), a village in Tafresh County, Markazi province, Iran
- Kundaj (Persian: كوندج), a village in Abyek County, Qazvin province, Iran
