= Moin (disambiguation) =

Moin is a greeting in Frisian and German dialects.

Moin may also refer to:

== People ==
=== Given name ===
- Moin (singer), Iranian singer
- Moin Akhter (1950–2011), Pakistani actor and comedian
- Moin Khan (born 1971), former Pakistani cricketer
- Syed Moinuddin (1924-1978), former Indian footballer, known as 'Moin'

=== Surname ===
- Mohammad Moin (1914–1971), Iranian scholar of Persian literature and Iranology
- Mostafa Moin (born 1951), Iranian politician
- Parviz Moin (born 1952), director of a research laboratory at the Stanford University

== Places ==
- Moin, Gevgelija, North Macedonia
- Moín, Costa Rica, a terminal port in the Limón province

== Other uses ==
- Moin (mythology), a serpent in Norse mythology
- MoinMoin, a wiki engine
- Moin moin, Nigerian cuisine
- Moin (band), a British music band

== See also ==
- Moeen, a given name and surname
- Moinabad (disambiguation)
