= Kohlu-ye Sofla =

Village in Markazi province, Iran

Kohlu-ye Sofla Persian: كهلوسفلي
- Village
- Location within Iran
- Coordinates: 34°59′33″N 49°46′10″E
- Country: Iran
- Province: Markazi
- County: Tafresh
- District: Central
- Rural District: Rudbar

Population (2016)
  - Total: 152
- Time zone: UTC+3:30 (IRST)

Kohlu-ye Sofla (Persian: كهلوسفلي) (Note: Also romanized as Kohlū-ye Soflá; also known as Kahloo, Kohlū Pā’īn, Kohlūy, Kohlū-ye Pā’īn, and Koholū) is a village in Rudbar Rural District of the Central District in Tafresh County, Markazi province, Iran.

== Demographics ==
=== Population ===
At the time of the 2006 National Census, the village's population was 285 in 106 households. The following census in 2011 counted 243 people in 92 households. The 2016 census measured the population of the village as 152 people in 67 households.
