= Khanak, Markazi =

Village in Markazi province, Iran

Khanak Persian: خانك
- Village
- Location within Iran
- Coordinates: 34°51′14″N 50°03′23″E
- Country: Iran
- Province: Markazi
- County: Tafresh
- District: Central
- Rural District: Kharrazan

Population (2016)
  - Total: 248
- Time zone: UTC+3:30 (IRST)

Khanak (Persian: خانك) (Note: Also romanized as Khānak) is a village in, and the capital of, Kharrazan Rural District in the Central District of Tafresh County, Markazi province, Iran.

== Demographics ==
=== Population ===
At the time of the 2006 National Census, the village's population was 242 in 92 households. The following census in 2011 counted 268 people in 106 households. The 2016 census measured the population of the village as 248 people in 108 households, the most populous in its rural district.
