= Delaram, Iran =

Delaram (Persian: دلارام) may refer to:

- Delaram, Markazi
- Delaram, Sistan and Baluchestan

== See also ==
- Delaram, city in Nimruz Province, Afghanistan
