= Borzeh =

Mountain in Iran

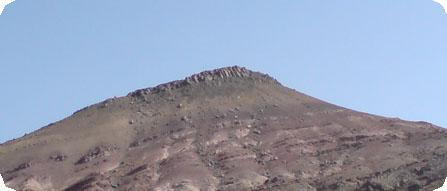
Borzeh

Borzeh is a 1,999-meter high mountain in Iran, near Tafresh and the village of Bazerjan.
