= Rudbar Rural District (Tafresh County) =

Rural district in Markazi province, Iran

Rudbar Rural District Persian: دهستان رودبار
- Rural District
- Location within Iran
- Coordinates: 34°53′N 49°41′E
- Country: Iran
- Province: Markazi
- County: Tafresh
- District: Central
- Established: 1987
- Capital: Joftan

Population (2016)
  - Total: 3,016
- Time zone: UTC+3:30 (IRST)

Rudbar Rural District (Persian: دهستان رودبار) is in the Central District of Tafresh County, Markazi province, Iran. Its capital is the village of Joftan.

== Demographics ==
=== Population ===
At the time of the 2006 National Census, the rural district's population was 3,656 in 1,133 households. There were 3,288 inhabitants in 1,114 households at the following census of 2011. The 2016 census measured the population of the rural district as 3,016 in 1,161 households. The most populous of its 31 villages was Joftan, with 382 people.

=== Other villages in the rural district ===
- Farak
- Fesengan
- Gazavand
- Haftan-e Olya
- Kohlu-ye Olya
- Kohlu-ye Sofla
- Nowbahar
- Qarah Jaqayah
