= Moinabad, Markazi =

Moinabad معين اباد
- Village
- Location within Iran
- Coordinates: 34°41′05″N 49°58′13″E
- Country: Iran
- Province: Markazi
- County: Tafresh
- Bakhsh: Central
- Rural District: Bazarjan

Population (2006)
  - Total: 63
- Time zone: UTC+3:30 (IRST)
  - Summer (DST): UTC+4:30 (IRDT)

Moinabad (Persian: معين اباد, also Romanized as Mo‘īnābād) is a village in Bazarjan Rural District, in the Central District of Tafresh County, Markazi Province, Iran. At the 2006 census, its population was 63, consisting of 19 families.
