= Kasheh, Markazi =

Village in Markazi province, Iran

Kasheh Persian: كشه
- Village
- Location within Iran
- Coordinates: 34°34′05″N 49°51′01″E
- Country: Iran
- Province: Markazi
- County: Tafresh
- District: Central
- Rural District: Kuh Panah

Population (2016)
  - Total: 135
- Time zone: UTC+3:30 (IRST)

Kasheh (Persian: كشه) is a village in Kuh Panah Rural District of the Central District in Tafresh County, Markazi province, Iran.

== Demographics ==
=== Population ===
At the time of the 2006 National Census, the village's population was 187 in 59 households. The following census in 2011 counted 168 people in 60 households. The 2016 census measured the population of the village as 135 people in 48 households.
