= Kaburan =

Village in Markazi province, Iran

Kaburan Persian: کبوران
- Village
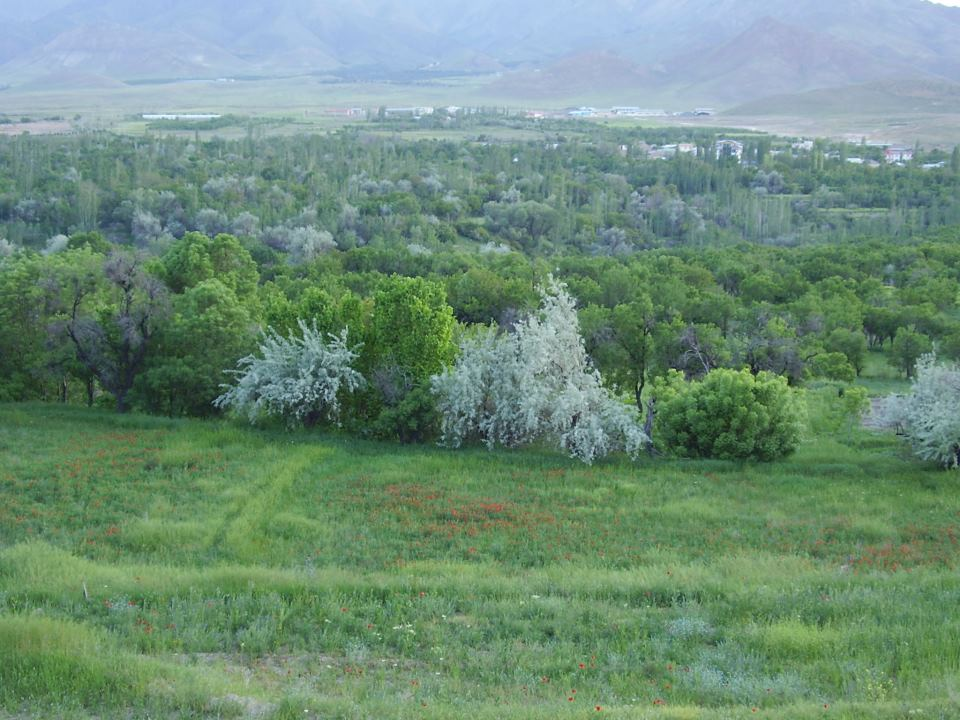
- The village of Kaburan

- Location within Iran
- Coordinates: 34°43′48″N 49°58′35″E
- Country: Iran
- Province: Markazi
- County: Tafresh
- District: Central
- Rural District: Bazarjan

Population (2016)
  - Total: 136
- Time zone: UTC+3:30 (IRST)

Kaburan (Persian: کبوران) (Note: Also romanized as Kabūrān; also known as Gaburan, also romanized as Gaburān; formerly Baharan (بهاران), also romanized as Bahārān) is a village in Bazarjan Rural District of the Central District in Tafresh County, Markazi province, Iran.

== Demographics ==
=== Population ===
At the time of the 2006 National Census, the village's population was 147 in 49 households. The following census in 2011 counted 119 people in 50 households. The 2016 census measured the population of the village as 136 people in 63 households.
