= Kasheh =

Kasheh or Kesheh (Persian: كشه) may refer to:

- Kesheh, Isfahan
- Kasheh, Markazi
