= Kharrazan Rural District =

Rural district in Markazi province, Iran

Kharrazan Rural District Persian: دهستان خرازان
- Rural District
- Location within Iran
- Coordinates: 34°50′N 50°04′E
- Country: Iran
- Province: Markazi
- County: Tafresh
- District: Central
- Established: 1993
- Capital: Khanak

Population (2016)
  - Total: 861
- Time zone: UTC+3:30 (IRST)

Kharrazan Rural District (Persian: دهستان خرازان) is in the Central District of Tafresh County, Markazi province, Iran. Its capital is the village of Khanak.

== Demographics ==
=== Population ===
At the time of the 2006 National Census, the rural district's population was 1,102 in 467 households. There were 1,303 inhabitants in 571 households at the following census of 2011. The 2016 census measured the population of the rural district as 861 in 409 households. The most populous of its 12 villages was Khanak, with 248 people.

=== Other villages in the rural district ===
- Abrahdar
- Dizaj
- Farismaneh
- Jalayer
- Kandej
- Kharrazan
- Sarabadan
