= Parvaneh Vossough =

Iranian physician

Parvaneh Vosogh
- پروانه وثوق
- Born: March 1935
- Died: May 2013 (aged 78)

Parvaneh Vossough (March 1935- May 2013 پروانه وثوق) was an Iranian physician, chiefly known for her work for children with cancer.

== Early life and education ==
Parvaneh Vossough was born in March 1935 in Tafresh, Iran. She joined the faculty of Medicine of Tehran University in 1961 where she received a doctorate degree in medicine. She completed her specialization in Pediatric Oncology at the Medical Sciences department of University of Illinois from 1962 to 1964. She later went to the universities of Cambridge and Massachusetts and finished her further studies in those universities. She also attended Washington University for her graduate course.

In 1971 she returned to Iran and practiced her profession in Ali Asghar Children's Hospital, Mofid and Tehran Children hospitals. She also was one of the founders and fixed members of the Mahak Sub specialty Hospital that is a charity hospital for children suffering from cancer.

Vossough treated many cancer-suffering children around the world, mostly in Iran, giving them health. She dedicated her life and career to those in need of her care, expertise and wisdom, and she had never married. She was called ‘Iran’s Mother Teresa’ by some people. She died on May 20, 2013, at the age of 78.

== Career ==
In 1971 Vossough began her professional work in Ali Asghar Hospital in Tehran. As a founding member of sub specialty course in blood and children's cancer in Iran, she founded the first hematology and oncology section in Ali Asghar Hospital, her effort led to the establishment of comparable departments in various hospitals. It was a groundbreaking work among her greatest success stories in the field of cancer treatment. Mofid and Tehran Children hospitals were also among the centers where professor Vossough practiced medicine.

Vossough also was a member of the board of trustees of Mahak Institute in Tehran. Mahak is a charity foundation set up to support children with cancer. It is also the name of a hospital specializing in cancer. She was a volunteer associate director of Mahak from the early time of Mahak's foundation. After her retirement, she became the chairperson of Mahak's Board of Trustees and later, she assumed the additional responsibility of becoming the chief physician of Mahak hospital. Throughout her many years of service, she functioned as a dedicated volunteer without ever collecting any compensation.

Vossough was an active member of various medical societies, including the International Society of Pediatric Oncology (SIOP), International Network for Cancer Treatment and Research (INCTR) and Middle East Children's Cancer Alliance (MECCA), Global cancer control UICC. She also published more than 100 papers in different medical journals.

== Commemoration ==
In a ceremony attended by Tehran's municipal authorities coincided with "National Doctors’ Day", the City Council of Tehran, based on a proposal from the Tehran municipality, has named a street in the Iranian capital, Tehran, after Parvaneh Vossough, known as "Angel for Kids with Cancer".
