= Khanak =

Khanakmay refer to:

- Khanak, a village and hill in Bhiwani district, Haryana, India
- Khanak, Markazi, Iran
- Khanak, Sistan and Baluchestan, a place in Sistan and Baluchestan Province, Iran
