= Jalayer, Tafresh =

Village in Markazi province, Iran

Jalayer Persian: جلاير
- Village
- Location within Iran
- Coordinates: 34°53′05″N 50°02′12″E
- Country: Iran
- Province: Markazi
- County: Tafresh
- District: Central
- Rural District: Kharrazan

Population (2016)
  - Total: 92
- Time zone: UTC+3:30 (IRST)

Jalayer (Persian: جلاير) (Note: Also romanized as Jalāīr and Jalāyer; also known as Jalāuer) is a village in Kharrazan Rural District of the Central District in Tafresh County, Markazi province, Iran.

== Demographics ==
=== Population ===
At the time of the 2006 National Census, the village's population was 150 in 59 households. The following census in 2011 counted 129 people in 55 households. The 2016 census measured the population of the village as 92 people in 42 households.
