= Kohlu-ye Olya =

Village in Markazi province, Iran

Kohlu-ye Olya Persian: كهلوعليا
- Village
- Location within Iran
- Coordinates: 35°01′35″N 49°42′36″E
- Country: Iran
- Province: Markazi
- County: Tafresh
- District: Central
- Rural District: Rudbar

Population (2016)
  - Total: 174
- Time zone: UTC+3:30 (IRST)

Kohlu-ye Olya (Persian: كهلوعليا) (Note: Also romanized as Kahloo Olya and Kohlū-ye ‘Olyā; also known as Kholeh Bāla, Kohlū, Kohlū Bālā, and Kohlū-ye Bālā) is a village in Rudbar Rural District of the Central District in Tafresh County, Markazi province, Iran.

== Demographics ==
=== Population ===
At the time of the 2006 National Census, the village's population was 248 in 84 households. The following census in 2011 counted 230 people in 89 households. The 2016 census measured the population of the village as 174 people in 82 households.
