= Mahak Hospital and Rehabilitation Complex =

- Mahak
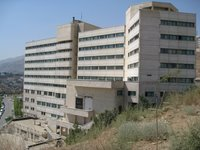

Geography
- Location: Darband, Tehran, Iran
- Coordinates: 35°49′09″N 51°29′37″E

Organisation
- Care system: Charity
- Type: Specialist

Services
- Emergency department: Yes
- Beds: 120
- Speciality: Pediatric Cancer

History
- Opened: 2003

Links
- Website: http://mahak-charity.org/
- Lists: Hospitals in Iran

Mahak Hospital and Rehabilitation Complex is a Pediatric Cancer Research and Hospital Center, located in Tehran, Iran. It was built and is organized by Mahak charity. The 120 bedroom complex focuses on the treatment and rehabilitation of children and providing support to their families during treatment.

== History ==
From the beginning of Mahak's activities, the need for creating facilities to help children with cancer became the long-term goal of the organization. A piece of land located in Darabad heights was purchased. The project was left on hold however, due to lack of funding and the size of the project. The work began in year 2000. Finally in 2003 Mahak 's Hospital and Rehabilitation Center, was completed.

The two Rehabilitation wards in Mahak were set up and made operational by August 2003. The center is situated above the city's northeastern heights and boasts an 18000 square meters building with 120 rooms equipped to accommodate patients accompanied by one member of their families.

== Facilities ==
Oncology and Chemotherapy clinics of the hospital are offering daily services to children and the laboratory is routinely carrying out Biochemical, Hematological, Microbiological, And Hormonal tests. Spiral CT Scan, Digital Radiology, Sonography and MRI tests are offered using state of the art equipment and highly skilled supervision. The Radiotherapy section of the Mahak's Hospital is equipped with Liner Accelerator and Simulator.
