= Abdul Karim Gharib =

Iranian geologist (1912 –2002)

- عبدالکریم قریب
- Born: 1912; Tehran
- Died: 17 February 2002 (aged 89–90); Ashtian
- Education: PhD in Geology (University of Tehran)
- Occupation: Geologist
- Known for: father of Iranian geology

Abdolkarim Gharib (1912 In Tehran – 17 February 2002 In Ashtian) was an Iranian geologist and academic. He has been described in multiple secondary sources as the “father of Iranian geology”. He was also one of the founders and early directors of the Higher School of Sciences in Arak, which later became the Arak University.

== Early life and education ==
Gharib was born in 1912 in Tehran. He completed his primary education at Safavid School and graduated from Tehran Seminary High School in 1935 with a science diploma. He initially enrolled in mathematics at university for a short period, before transferring to the natural sciences. He completed his undergraduate studies in natural sciences in 1938, where geology formed part of his academic training. During this period, he studied under severalmasters, including Ahmad Parsa in botany.

== Academic career ==
Gharib joined the Higher School of Sciences, where he later became an associate professor in 1955. He remained active in academic teaching and research for several decades and retired in 1969 after approximately 38 years of service. Between 1969 and 1975, he played a key role in the establishment and administration of the Higher School of Sciences in Arak, which later developed into part of Arak University’s academic structure.

In 1992, Kharazmi University held a scientific seminar in recognition of his contributions to geology and education in Iran. In 1993, a section of the library of the Atomic Energy Organization of Iran was named in his honor.

== Death ==
He passed away on 17 February 2002 in Ashtian and was buried at the Islamic Azad University, Ashtian Branch.

== Works ==
- بلورشناسی، چاپخانه علمی، 1950
- کانی‌شناسی، درباره کانی‌های جزیره هرمز، دانشگاه تهران، 1957
- اصول علم کانی‌ها، چاپخانه علمی، 1959
- شناختن کانی‌ها به وسیله معرفهای شیمیایی، دانشگاه تربیت معلم، 1965
- چگونه کانی‌ها را می‌توان شناخت، دانشگاه تربیت معلم، 1965
- مقالاتی چند درباره زمین، دانشگاه تربیت معلم، 1966
- سنگ شناسی، دانشگاه تربیت معلم، 1967
- یک دوره ۱۷ جلدی کتاب‌های طبیعی برای دبیرستانها، 1967
- گرکان، نشر آفتاب، 1984
- زمین در فضا، نشر آفتاب، 1984
- فرهنگ زمین‌شناسی، انتشارات انزلی، 1987
- مبارزه با عوارض پیری، چاپخانه رامین، 1992
- شناخت سنگها با نگاهی ویژه به سنگهای ایران، جلد اول، انتشارات و آموزش انقلاب اسلامی، 1993
- 1994 شناخت سنگها با نگاهی ویژه به سنگهای ایران، جلد دوم، انتشارات و آموزش انقلاب اسلامی
- واژه‌های زمین شناسی، دانشگاه تربیت معلم، 1998
