= Islamic Azad University, Tafresh Branch =

- دانشگاه آزاد اسلامی واحد تفرش; Danushgah-e Âzad-e Eslâmi-ye Vahed-e Tefresh
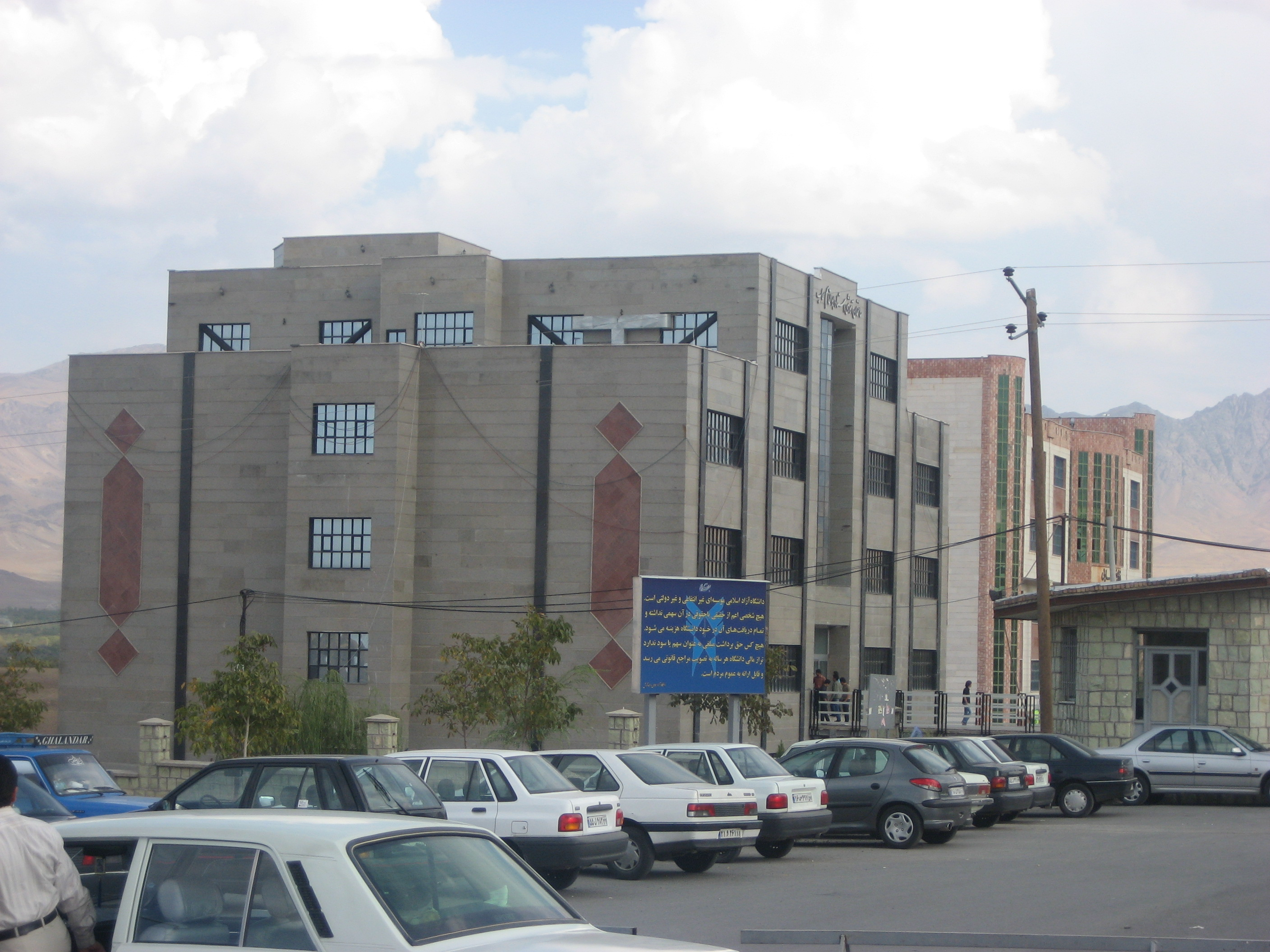
- Type: Private
- Established: 1997
- President: Ali Akbar Sherafati Nezhad
- Students: 3,000
- Location: Tafresh, Markazi province, Iran; 34°41′51″N 49°58′58″E
- Campus: Urban
- Website: www.iautb.ac.ir

The Islamic Azad University, Tafresh Branch, is a branch of Iran's Islamic Azad Universities. It is situated in the city of Tafresh 222 kilometers southwest of Tehran. This university with more than 3000 students and more than 100 professors provides 20 different majors.

== See also ==
- Tafresh University
- Higher education in Iran
- List of Iranian Universities
