= Bazarjan Rural District =

Rural district in Markazi province, Iran

Bazarjan Rural District Persian: دهستان بازرجان
- Rural District
- Location within Iran
- Coordinates: 34°47′N 49°55′E
- Country: Iran
- Province: Markazi
- County: Tafresh
- District: Central
- Capital: Bazarjan

Population (2016)
  - Total: 3,429
- Time zone: UTC+3:30 (IRST)

Bazarjan Rural District (Persian: دهستان بازرجان) is in the Central District of Tafresh County, Markazi province, Iran. Its capital is the village of Bazarjan.

== Demographics ==
=== Population ===
At the time of the 2006 National Census, the rural district's population was 3,779 in 1,275 households. There were 3,540 inhabitants in 1,263 households at the following census of 2011. The 2016 census measured the population of the rural district as 3,429 in 1,313 households. The most populous of its 47 villages was Kahak, with 292 people.

=== Other villages in the rural district ===
- Dinjerd
- Kaburan
- Karyan
- Kukan
- Naqusan
- Qezeljeh
- Tararan-e Bala
- Tararan-e Pain
