= Parsana =

Scientific classification
- Kingdom: Plantae
- Clade: Tracheophytes
- Clade: Angiosperms
- Clade: Eudicots
- Clade: Rosids
- Order: Rosales
- Family: Urticaceae
- Genus: Parsana; Parsa & Maleki
- Species: P. malekiana

Binomial name
- Parsana malekiana Parsa & Maleki

Genus of plants

Parsana is a monotypic genus of flowering plants belonging to the family Urticaceae. It just contains one species, Parsana malekiana Parsa & Maleki

It is native to Iran.

The genus name of Parsana is in honour of Ahmad Parsa (1907–1997), an Iranian botanist and co-author of the genus. The Latin specific epithet of malekiana refers to Zeynol-Abedin (or Zeinolabedin) Maleki, (1913-) the other co-author of the plant genus and species. Both the genus and the species were first described and published in A.Parsa, Fl. Iran, Suppl. Gen. on page 548 in 1952.
