= Tafresh =

City in Markazi province, Iran

Tafresh Persian: تفرش
- City
- Tafresh in summer

- Location within Iran
- Coordinates: 34°41′39″N 50°01′16″E
- Country: Iran
- Province: Markazi
- County: Tafresh
- District: Central

Population (2016)
  - Total: 16,493
- Time zone: UTC+3:30 (IRST)

Tafresh (Persian: تفرش) (Note: Also romanized as Tafreš) is a city in the Central District of Tafresh County, Markazi province, Iran, serving as capital of both the county and the district. Tafresh is located amidst high mountains 222 kilometres (138 mi) southwest of Tehran.

== History ==
Tafresh is believed to be one of the oldest regions in the present Markazi province and constituted a Zoroastrian stronghold in antiquity. A famous general by the name Delaram of Tafresh fought in the defense of Sasanian Iran during the Islamic conquest and has given name to the village Delaram nearby Tafresh. Today the village is also called Teraran.

There are fifty historical monuments in Tafresh that have been listed as part of Iranian national heritage. These include ruins of Zoroastrian places of worship and burial sites (so-called dakhmas) in and around the town, particularly on the summits of the surrounding mountains and hills. There are also remains of Zoroastrian dakhmas in nearby villages, such as in Kaburan and Khalchal.

Tafresh appears in the Nuzhat al-Qulub of the 14th-century author Hamdallah Mustawfi, who reported that the town encompassed of 13 villages, the largest ones being Fam and Tarkhuran. He further reported that the town was assessed for a tax value of 6000 dinars, and the inhabitants were adherents of Twelver Shi'ism.

== Demographics ==
=== Population ===
At the time of the 2006 National Census, the city's population was 13,914 in 4,254 households. The following census in 2011 counted 16,447 people in 4,928 households. The 2016 census measured the population of the city as 16,493 people in 5,232 households.

== Geography ==
The flight distance between Tehran and Tafresh is 170 km towards southwest. The average altitude of Tafresh is 1912 meters above sea level, with a continental and semi-arid climate with an annual rainfall of 270 mm.

== Learning and culture ==
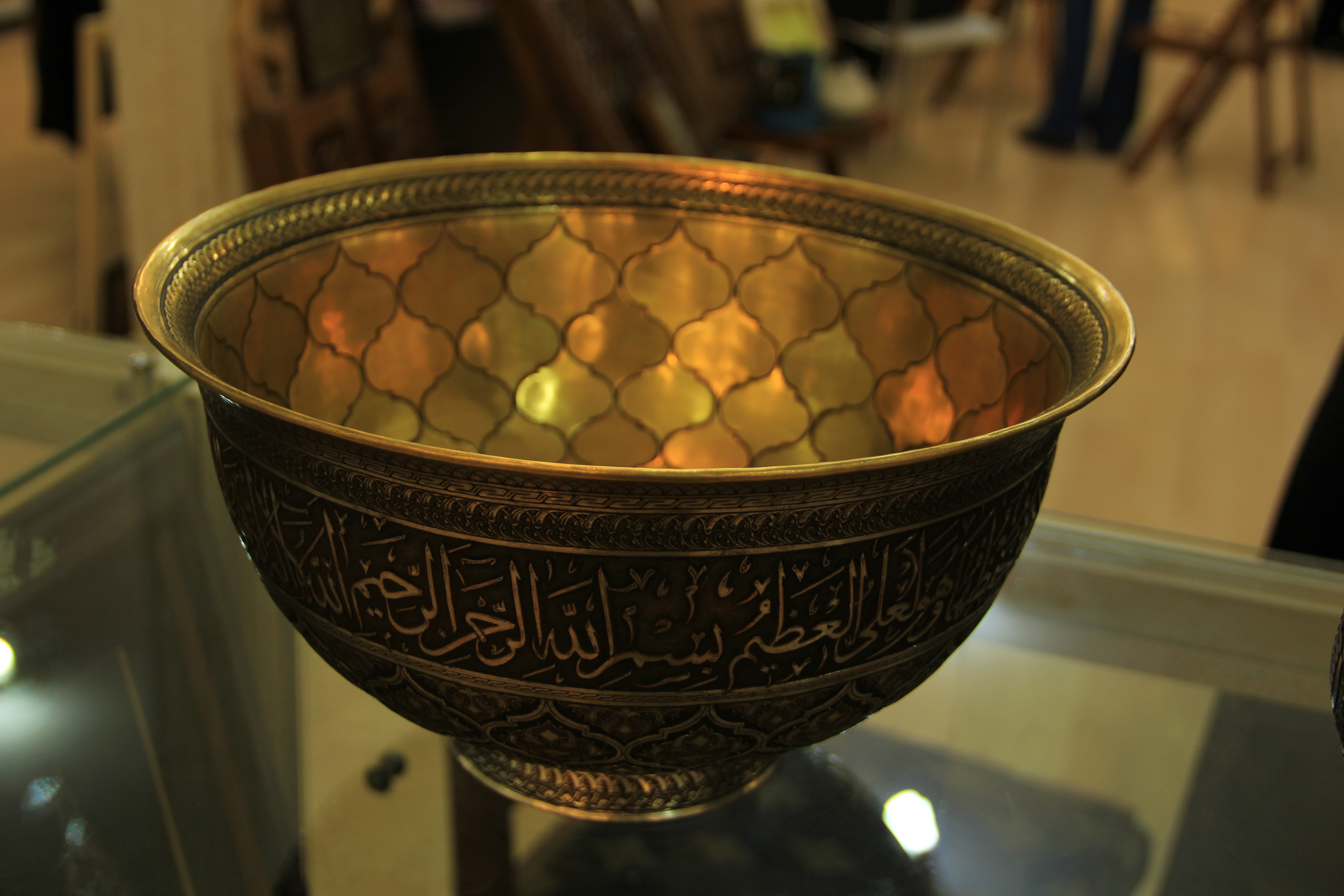
Tafresh is famous for its artistic metalworking

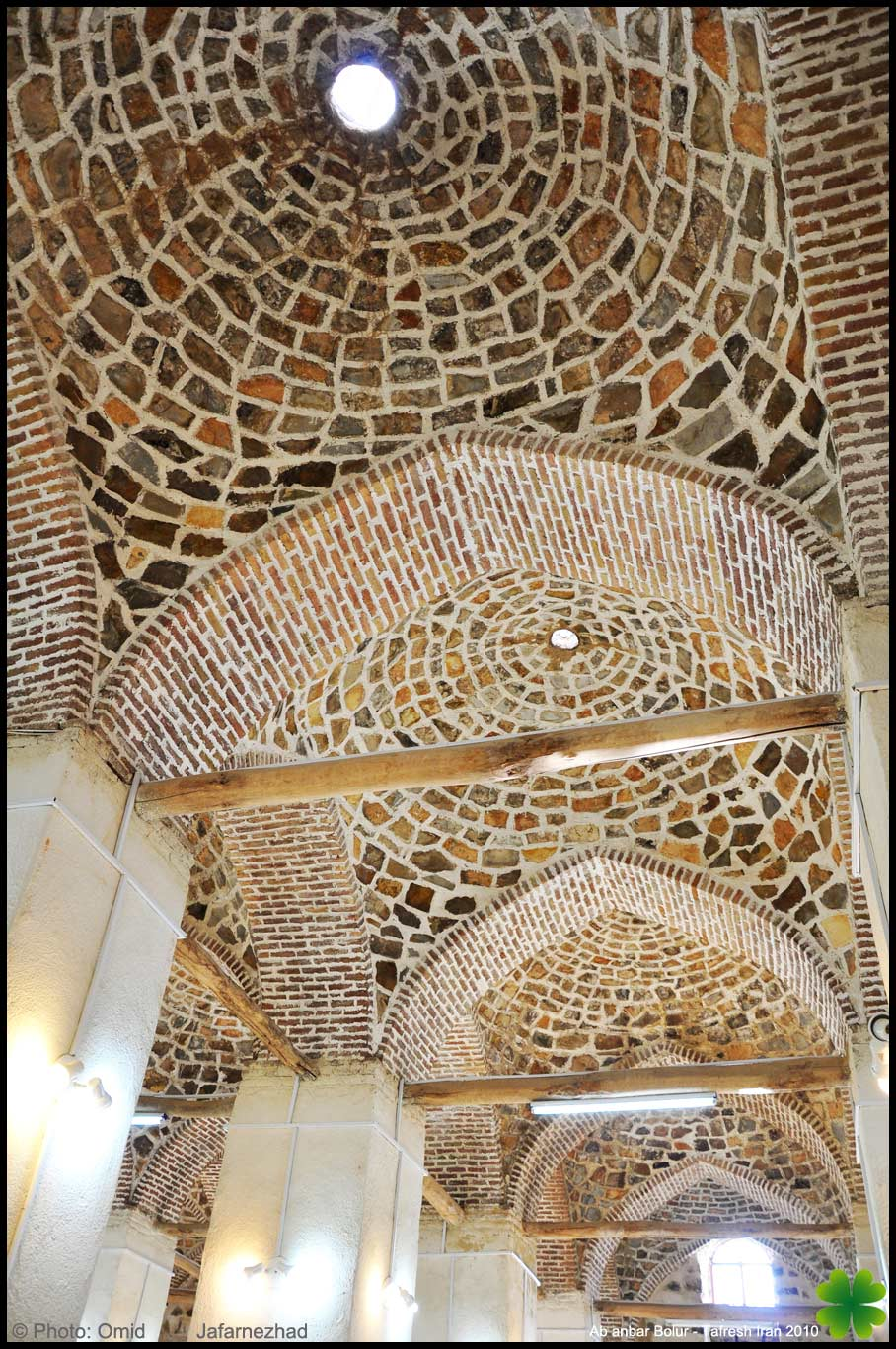
The ceiling inside the drinking water reservoir Ab anbar-e Bolur in Tafresh.

Despite its small size, Tafresh is known in Iran for being the cradle of science, literature, culture and art, as well as a land of mountains and plains, springs and waterfalls.

Tafresh has provided Iran with many notable figures such as poets, ministers, statesmen, scientists and calligraphers, especially from Qajar times and onwards. The Qajar statesmen Amir Kabir and Ghasem Magham Farahani hailed from the Tafresh Province. The strong tradition of learning reassured the early establishment of Modern Schools in the early 20th century.

Famous scientists from Tafresh include Mahmoud Hessaby, the father of modern physics in Iran, Ahmad Parsa, the father of Iranian botanics, Abbas Sahab, the father of cartography in Iran, Mohammad Gharib, the father of pediatrics in Iran, and Abdolkarim Gharib, the father of modern geology in Iran.

For this reason Tafresh has received the nickname "City of Iran's Fathers" (Shahr-e pedarān-e Irān). The city has preserved its position as an important Iranian scientific and literary center in the 21st century due to its modern universities.

The village of Delaram, with a population today of about 250 people, is famous as the "Village of physicians" (Dehkade-ye pezeshkān) since it has produced more than 175 physicians.

== Traditional handicrafts ==
Tafresh is famous for its traditional carpet weaving and artistic metalworking. The Tafresh carpet is of the Hamadan type but the quality is finer than the average production of that area.

== Universities ==
Three universities are situated in Tafresh:

- Tafresh University (formerly branch of Amirkabir University of Technology).
- Islamic Azad University, Tafresh branch.
- Payame Noor University, Tafresh branch.

== Notable people ==
- Ashk Dahlén, professor, scholar in Iranian Studies, translator
- Fereydoun Farrokhzad, originally from Tafresh, singer, actor, TV host, political figure
- Forough Farrokhzad, originally from Tafresh, poet, film director
- Mahmoud Hessabi, originally from Tafresh, scholar of modern physics
- Ali Mansur, originally from Tafresh, prime minister
- Mehran Modiri, originally from Tafresh, director and actor
- Ali Mosaffa, originally from Tafresh, movie actor
- Ahmad Parsa, originally from Tafresh, botanist
- Abbas Sahab, pioneer in cartography
- Shaykh Tabarsi, a Persian Shia scholar
- Parvaneh Vossough, physician, chiefly known for her work for children with cancer

== See also ==
Media related to Tafresh at Wikimedia Commons

Tafresh travel guide from Wikivoyage

== Sources ==
- Le Strange, Guy (1919). The Geographical Part Of The Nuzhat-al-qulub. Brill. OCLC 976165251.
