= WWE Wal3ooha =

WWE television program

- Genre: Sports entertainment; Professional wrestling
- Created by: Vince McMahon
- Countries of origin: United Arab Emirates; United States
- No. of seasons: 3
- No. of episodes: 391

Production
- Camera setup: Multicamera setup
- Production company: WWE

Original release
- Network: OSN Sports (2017 – 2019); MBC Action (2018 – present
- Release: May 4, 2017 – present

Related
- Bottom Line; Experience; Afterburn; Vintage; Free For All; Raw Sunday Dhamaal

WWE Wal3ooha (WWE ولعوها), or simply Wal3ooha, is a television program produced by WWE originally broadcast on OSN Sports in the United Arab Emirates, which features recaps of Monday Night Raw and Friday Night SmackDown as well as exclusive interviews with WWE wrestlers and personalities. The show's title translates to “light it up” and is the first WWE program to feature original and localized content intended exclusively for the Middle East and North Africa market.

In October 2018 the show also began airing on MBC Action.

== Hosts ==
Year(s)	Hosts
May 4, 2017–present	Moein Al Bastaki and Nathalie Mamo

== See also ==
- List of WWE broadcasters
