= Moinabad-e Bala =

Moinabad-e Bala معين ابادبالا
- Village
- Location within Iran
- Coordinates: 36°31′13″N 59°39′03″E
- Country: Iran
- Province: Razavi Khorasan
- County: Mashhad
- Bakhsh: Central
- Rural District: Tabadkan

Population (2006)
  - Total: 459
- Time zone: UTC+3:30 (IRST)
  - Summer (DST): UTC+4:30 (IRDT)

Moinabad-e Bala (Persian: معين ابادبالا, also Romanized as Mo‘īnābād-e Bālā; also known as Mo‘īnābād-e ‘Olyā) is a village in Tabadkan Rural District, in the Central District of Mashhad County, Razavi Khorasan Province, Iran. At the 2006 census, its population was 459, in 119 families.
