= Moinabad-e Sofla =

Moinabad-e Sofla معين ابادسفلي
- Village
- Location within Iran
- Coordinates: 36°30′44″N 59°39′37″E
- Country: Iran
- Province: Razavi Khorasan
- County: Mashhad
- Bakhsh: Central
- Rural District: Tabadkan

Population (2006)
  - Total: 348
- Time zone: UTC+3:30 (IRST)
  - Summer (DST): UTC+4:30 (IRDT)

Moinabad-e Sofla (Persian: معين ابادسفلي, also Romanized as Mo‘īnābād-e Soflá; also known as Mo‘īnābād-e Pā’īn) is a village in Tabadkan Rural District, in the Central District of Mashhad County, Razavi Khorasan Province, Iran. At the 2006 census, its population was 348, in 88 families.
