= Moinabad, Sanandaj =

Moinabad معين اباد
- Village
- Location within Iran
- Coordinates: 35°31′33″N 46°52′09″E
- Country: Iran
- Province: Kurdistan
- County: Sanandaj
- Bakhsh: Central
- Rural District: Sarab Qamish

Population (2006)
  - Total: 45
- Time zone: UTC+3:30 (IRST)
  - Summer (DST): UTC+4:30 (IRDT)

Moinabad (Persian: معين اباد, also Romanized as Mo‘īnābād; also known as Qalā Peyvand) is a village in Sarab Qamish Rural District, in the Central District of Sanandaj County, Kurdistan Province, Iran. At the 2006 census, its population was 45, in 9 families. The village is populated by Kurds.
