= Jalayer (surname) =

Jalayer (Persian: جلاير) is a Persian surname. Notable people with the surname include:

- Parviz Jalayer (1939–2019), Iranian weightlifter
- Tahmasp Khan Jalayer, 18th-century Iranian military commander
