= Tafresh University =

- دانشگاه تفرش
- Former name: Tafresh Amir Kabir University of Technology (TAUT)
- Type: Public
- Established: 1987
- President: Dr.Mahmoud Reza Shahverdi
- Academic staff: 88
- Students: 2,179
- Undergraduates: 1800
- Postgraduates: 300
- Location: Tafresh, Markazi, Iran; 34.6769°N 50.0535°E
- Campus: Urban
- Website: tafreshu.ac.ir

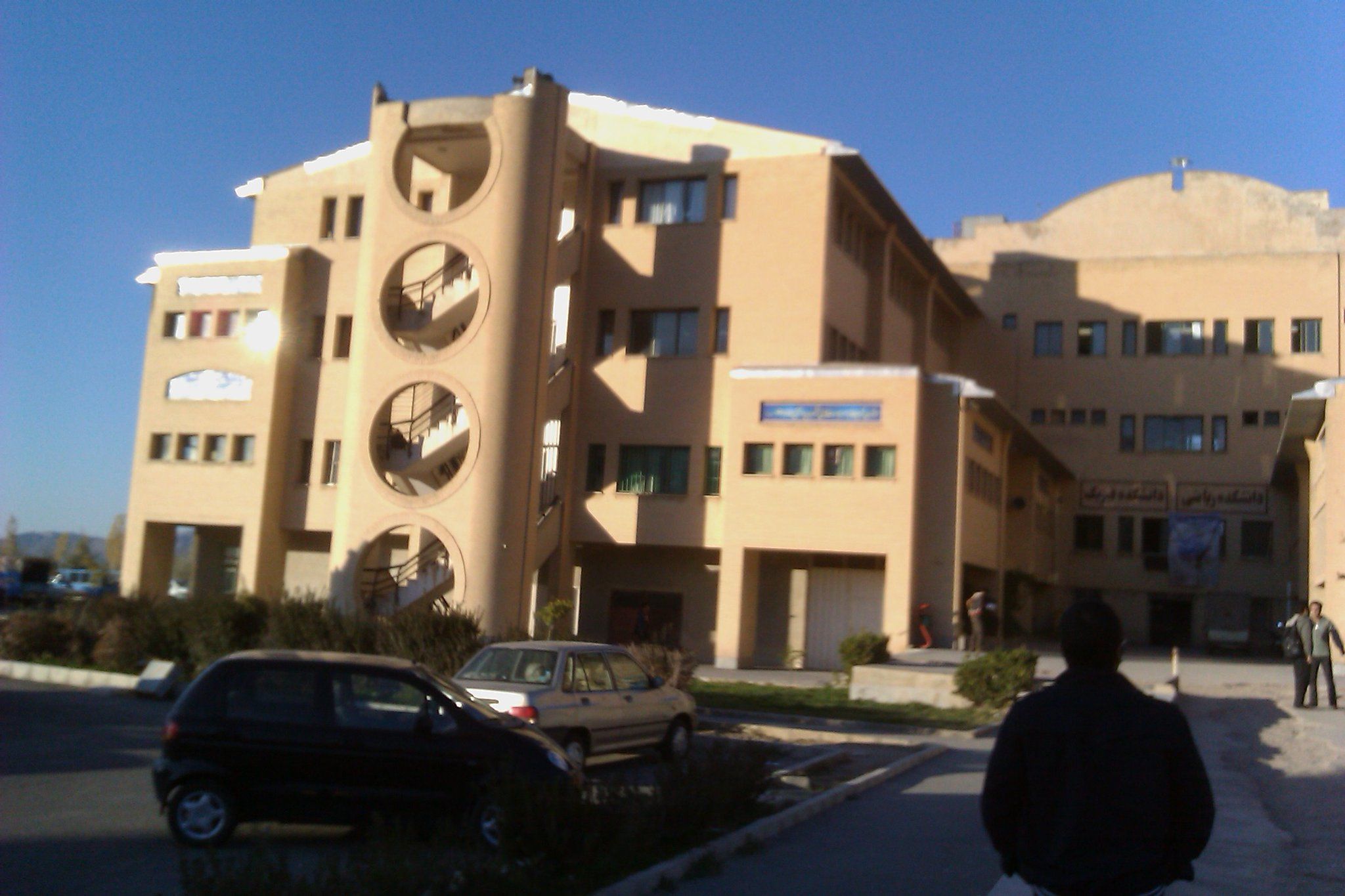
One of the university buildings

Tafresh University (Persian: دانشگاه تفرش), formerly named Tafresh Amir Kabir University of Technology (TAUT) is an educational university located in Tafresh, Iran. Now, about 3,000 students study in this university.

== History ==
iIn 1988, Tafresh University began academic activities. Tafresh University was elevated to an independent university in 2005.

== Academics ==
Tafresh University was founded to constitute 4 research centres and 17 faculties with 45 academic majors available at undergraduate and graduate levels. At the time being Tafresh University hosts 2,130 students in 7 academic disciplines.

Presently, Tafresh university has 70 full-time academic staff members. They comprise the following faculties:

- Electrical engineering
- Industrial engineering
- Mechanical engineering
- Civil and Geodesy engineering
- Chemical engineering
- Mathematics
- Physics

The university offers the following academic majors at the B.Sc. level:

- Mechanical engineering – Mechanics of fluids and heat
- Electrical engineering – Electronics
- Electrical engineering – Control
- Electrical engineering – Power
- Civil engineering – Surveying
- Civil engineering – Civil
- Industrial engineering – Industrial technology
- Chemical engineering
- Mathematics – Pure
- Mathematics – Applied
- Mathematics and its applications
- Physics

Academic majors at the M.Sc. level are:

- Civil engineering – Surveying – Photogrammetry
- Civil engineering – Structure
- Civil engineering - Soil Mechanics and Foundation
- Industrial engineering – Management systems
- Industrial engineering – Industry
- Electrical engineering – Electronics
- Electrical engineering – Control
- Electrical engineering – Power
- Mechanical engineering – Manufacturing
- Applied Mathematics – Numerical Analysis
- Pure Mathematics – Geometry
- Physics – Fundamental Particles and Field theory
- Physics – Nuclear

The university offers the following academic fields at the PhD level:

- Electrical engineering - Control
- Mathematics – Algebraic graph theory

== See also ==
- Higher education in Iran
- Science in Iran
