= Moinabad, Divandarreh =

Moinabad معين آباد
- Village
- Location within Iran
- Coordinates: 36°08′48″N 47°06′49″E
- Country: Iran
- Province: Kurdistan
- County: Divandarreh
- Bakhsh: Karaftu
- Rural District: Kani Shirin

Population (2006)
  - Total: 167
- Time zone: UTC+3:30 (IRST)
  - Summer (DST): UTC+4:30 (IRDT)

Moinabad (Persian: معين آباد, also Romanized as Mo‘īnābād) is a village in Kani Shirin Rural District, Karaftu District, Divandarreh County, Kurdistan Province, Iran. At the 2006 census, its population was 167, in 31 families. The village is populated by Kurds.
