= Jalayer, East Azerbaijan =

Jalayer جلاير
- village
- Location within Iran
- Coordinates: 38°31′02″N 47°28′48″E
- Country: Iran
- Province: East Azerbaijan
- County: Ahar
- Bakhsh: Central
- Rural District: Qeshlaq

Population (2006)
  - Total: 86
- Time zone: UTC+3:30 (IRST)
  - Summer (DST): UTC+4:30 (IRDT)

Jalayer (Persian: جلاير, also Romanized as Jalāyer; also known as Jalāyer Qeshlāq) is a village in Qeshlaq Rural District, in the Central District of Ahar County, East Azerbaijan Province, Iran. At the 2006 census, its population was 86, in 16 families.
