= Moeen Marastial =

Afghan politician (born 1950)

Mohammad Moeen Marastial

MP MNA
- In office January, 2005 – December, 2009
- President: Hamid Karzai

Deputy Minister of Education
- In office 10 March 2001 – 25 December 2003
- President: Hamid Karzai

Senior Adviser
- In office 11 January 2003 – 6 June 2005
- President: Hamid Karzai

Deputy Chairman of the Rights and Justice Party of Afghanistan
- Incumbent
- Assumed office Formed in 2009

Consul General of Afghanistan
- In office September 2017 – Resigned in December 2019
- President: Ashraf Ghani

Personal details
- Born: Khan Abad, Afghanistan
- Party: Truth and Justice (since 2009)

Mohammad Moeen Marastial (Pashto: معین مرستیال محمد ; born 1 February 1950) is an Afghan politician who served as a Member of Parliament in Wolesi Jirga, the lower house, representing the people of Afghanistan from 2003 to 2009. During his incumbency, he advocated for education for all, a receptive and accountable government, focusing on the best interests of the nation and a strong rule of law.

== Life and career ==
Pohanmal Moeen Marastial migrated to Melbourne, Australia in September 1982. During his early years, Marastial founded a partnership business between Afghanistan and Australia. He also worked as a Legal Interpreter and translator for The department of immigration and border affairs

Moeen returned to Afghanistan in the Summer of 2001, following the Borne conference in Germany, where he was appointed as the Deputy Minister of Education.

In 2003, Marastial was appointed as a Senior Adviser to the Minister of Interior Affairs and at the mean time, the general director for The Afghanistan Stabilisation Program.

Marastial was a Member of the Parliament of Afghanistan from 2003 to 2009.

In 2009, he was appointed as a political advisor to Hamid Karzai's Campaign team for presidency. Karzai went on to win the elections in 2009, voted as President.

In 2014 Marastial worked in the political and media campaign team of Ashraf Ghani, who is the current president of Afghanistan. Following his election as President in September, Ashraf Ghani wished for Marastial to work with him in the government, but he respectfully declined, saying he preferred to lead his own political party "Rights and Justice Party of Afghanistan", now known as the Truth and Justice Party or Hezb-e-Haq-wa-Adalat. Its members come from various ethnic groups, representing the Pashtuns, Tajiks, Hazaras, Uzbeks, Balochs and Nuristanis.

During his time outside Afghanistan, Moeen Marastial participated in many conferences about the issues in Afghanistan in nations such as Pakistan, India, Turkey, USA and Germany. He was an active member of those conferences.

In September 2017, President Ghani suggested that he resume working with the Government of Afghanistan and take up the role of The Afghan Consul General in Peshawar, in which he accepted. He hoped that would lead to regional peace. “Such contacts and visits at the government level in both the countries should continue as these will improve the ties between the two brotherly Islamic countries and strengthen the efforts for peace,” he said while he was working at the Consulate General. In late 2019, Moeen, resigned from his position, as the Consul General, wishing to retire from the Government.

Aside from his work with the Parliament of Afghanistan, Moeen graduated from Kabul University in Literature and Language Arts, at the age of 22. Following this, Moeen began working as a Lecturer in Literature at the age of 23, at Kabul University. He continued to do so until him and his family, migrated to India, where he began working as an associate professor at Jawaharlal Nehru University (JNU), New Delhi from 1980 to 1982. Marastial, then migrated to Melbourne, Australia in September, 1982.

He is fluent in Pashto, Dari, Persian and English.

== Education ==
Lucknow University Class of 1982 · Master of Arts · Lucknow, Uttar Pradesh

RMIT University Class of 1977· English language · Melbourne, Victoria, Australia Certificate

Kabul University Class of 1972 · Literature/Language Arts · Chaman, Kabul, Afghanistan

KhanAbad High school Class of 1968 · Khan Abad, Afghanistan

== Career highlights ==
Member of High Council of Afghanistan Conflict Resolution · 2014 to present · Kabul, Afghanistan

Consul General of Afghanistan in Peshawar. 2017 to 2019. Peshawar, Pakistan

Hambastagi Consulting Group Senior researcher · 2011 to 2014 · Kabul, Afghanistan

Parliament of Afghanistan Elected member · 2005 to 2010

Afghanistan Stabilization Program Program Manager · 2003 to 2005 · Kabul, Afghanistan

Afghan Ministry of Interior Affairs Senior Advisor · 2003 to 2004 · Kabul, Afghanistan

وزارت معارف - Ministry of Education Deputy Minister of Administration & Finance · 2002 to 2003 · Kabul, Afghanistan

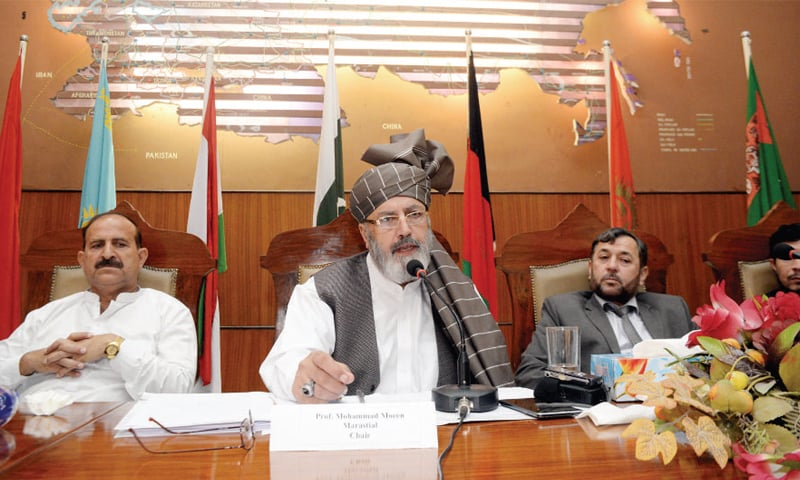

Australian Department of Immigration and Ethnic Affairs Certified Legal Translator- Interpreter · 1983 to 2001 · Melbourne, Victoria, Australia

Jawaharlal Nehru University (JNU), New Delhi Associate Professor · 1980 to 1982

Kabul University Lecturer · 1973 to 1979 · Kabul, Afghanistan

== Life in Australia ==
In 1982, Professor Mohammad Moeen Marastial was granted asylum in Australia.

Marastial has three sons. His family reside in Melbourne, Australia, where he is a prominent figure of the Afghan community.

Whilst in Australia, Marastial organized for Australian Senator Richard Kenneth Robert Alston and himself, to visit the Mujahideen leaders in Pakistan Following this, Moeen and Richard went to Afghanistan to meet with Dr Mohammad Najibullah, President of Afghanistan and the former king of Afghanistan Zahir Shah, in Italy, to discuss Afghanistan’s issues.

Aside from this, Marastial visited Afghanistan with The Mujahideen in the battle front several times and supported them.
