= Moein Taghavi =

Personal information
- Full name: Seyed Moein Taghavi
- Nationality: Iranian
- Born: 14 April 1990 (age 36) Nur, Mazandaran Province, Iran
- Height: 180 cm (5 ft 11 in)
- Weight: 90 kg (198 lb)

Sport
- Country: Iran
- Sport: Wushu
- Event: Sanda
Medal record
Representing Iran
Men's sanda
Asian Youth
Bronze medal – third place	2007 Seol	85 kg
West Asia
Gold medal – first place	2008 Bandarabbas	85 kg
World Youth
Silver medal – second place	2008 Bali	85 kg
Pars International
Gold medal – first place	2011 Tehran	85 kg
Gold medal – first place	2018 Tehran	85 kg
Asian Championship
Gold medal – first place	2016 Taiwan	85 kg
World Championships
Gold medal – first place	2017 Kazan	70 kg

Seyed Moein Taghavi (Persian: معین تقوی, born 14 April 1990 in Nur, Iran), also known as Moein Taghavi, is an Iranian wushu athlete. Taghavi has a record of winning domestic competitions, Asian championships and world championships. He also won a gold medal in the Wushu World Cup and won the championship title, but due to the positive announcement of his doping test, the medal won was lost for Taghavi.

== Positive doping test ==
Taghavi, who participated in the 2018 China World Cup as a member of Iran's national wushu team, was able to win the gold medal against Vadzim Lurich from Belarus in the final match of minus 85 kg. After winning this title, Moein Taghavi was subjected to a doping test, and after the investigations, the result of this test was positive, so that his gold medal in the World Cup competitions was withdrawn. Also, Taghavi was banned from wushu for 4 years. Hamidreza Gholipour and Maryam Hashemi were among the other wrestlers whose doping test results were also declared positive.
