= Mahak =

Iranian NGO for children's cancer

Mahak Logo

The Mahak Society to Support Children with Cancer (Persian: مؤسسهٔ خیریهٔ حمایت از کودکان مبتلا به سرطان) is a non-governmental organisation in Tehran dedicated to helping Iranian children with cancer. It runs an 18000 sq m hospital in the north of Tehran.

== Foundation of MAHAK ==
The organisation was founded in 1991 by Saeedeh Ghods.

== MAHAK hospital and rehabilitation centre ==
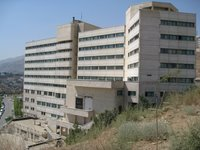
The Mahak hospital

In 2003, MAHAK’s Hospital and Rehabilitation center in Darabad was completed. The center is situated in Tehran’s North Eastern hills and comprises an 18000 square meters building equipped to accommodate up to 120 children, each accompanied by a member of their family.

== Operation ==
The wards were equipped and began operation in August 2003. MAHAK pays all related expenses including X-rays, test, chemotherapy, radiation therapy, food, clothing and all accommodation during their treatment.

== Awards ==
Saideh Ghods received the 2008 IDB prize from the Islamic Development Bank for her work with Mahak

== See also ==
- Healthcare in Iran
