= Ahmad Parsa =

Iranian botanist (1907–1997)

Ahmad Parsa (1907 in Tafresh, Iran – July 4, 1997 in California) was an Iranian botanist. After obtaining his doctorate in France, he returned to Iran and became the first modern professor of Botany at Tehran in 1933. He helped establish a natural history museum with a herbarium in Tehran in 1954. He wrote eight volumes on the flora of Iran published between 1943 and 1959, in which he described over 250 new species. He has also formally published 280 names, including Parsana, a monotypic genus of flowering plants from Iran belonging to the family Urticaceae.

Ahmad Parsa is survived by two daughters, and three sons. Flora Stay D.D.S., Vida Parsa, Cyrus Parsa, M.D., Kooros Parsa, M.D., and Dariush Parsa, M.D.

== Standard author abbreviation ==
The standard author abbreviation Parsa is used to indicate this person as the author when citing a botanical name.
