= Moein Al Bastaki =

Emirati presenter

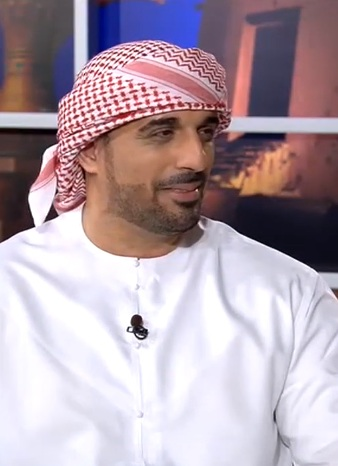
- Al Bastaki in 2019

Personal information
- Born: 29 August 1980 (age 46) Dubai, United Arab Emirates
- Education: University of Dubai

Professional wrestling career
- Ring name: Al Bastaki
- Debut: 2017

Moein Al Bastaki (Arabic: معين البستكي; born 29 August 1980) is an Emirati television presenter and magician. Hailing from Dubai, Al Bastaki is best known for his street magic, large illusions, mentalism and performing close up magic for international and Arabic celebrities. He is currently signed with WWE where he hosts WWE Wal3ooha.

== Early life ==
Moein Al Bastaki was born and raised in Dubai, United Arab Emirates. He is the eldest of four siblings.

== Education ==
Moein Al Bastaki graduated from Al Imam Malik school in 1998. He then attended Dubai University College where he graduated, with a bachelor's degree in Business, in 2004. Having been deprived of an education himself, Al Bastaki’s father disagreed with Al Bastaki’s choice of career, and insisted that his son focus on education instead, so Al Bastaki continued with his studies and obtained a master's degree in marketing from the University of Wollongong in Dubai in 2008.

== Magic career ==
Al Bastaki began his career as a magician in 2005, initially performing for friends and family before moving into professional entertainment. His first professional performance took place at a New Year's Eve event in Dubai in 2005. Between 2005 and 2010, he performed close-up magic and stage illusions at various events and festivals throughout the United Arab Emirates.

In 2010, Al Bastaki expanded his career into television and radio, making his television debut on Sama Dubai TV. He gained wider public attention through a magic performance in which he appeared the Emirati Singer Abdullah Bul Khair vanish from his home and reappeared in the studio. The performance received considerable attention from television programs and radio stations in the UAE. He subsequently attracted further interest for a television illusion in which he appeared to make Dubai's Burj Khalifa disappear in front of a live audience.

Following these performances, Al Bastaki continued to appear at public events and on Arabic-language television programs. He later became a weekly guest on Men El Akher, broadcast on DMTV, further establishing his presence in regional entertainment. Not only as a magician but also as a presenter for events and TV Shows.

in 2015, Al Bastaki introduced a range of magic products under his own brand. The products were distributed through toy shops in the United Arab Emirates and other Gulf cooperation Council (GCC) markets.

In 2016, he expanded his performance to incorporate elements of mentalism combining traditional magic with demonstrations presented as feats of mental ability. His work also incorporated Middle Eastern cultural influences into his performance style, distinguishing his presentations from conventional stage magic.

== TV appearances ==
Al Bastaki has appeared on a number of TV stations including MBC, Al Arabiya, CNN, BBC, Abu Dhabi TV, Dubai One, Dubai Television, Dubai Sports, Rotana, Qatar TV, Orbit TV, DMTV and Future Television, and radio stations including MBC FM, Panorama FM, Saudi Radio and Dubai FM He has appeared on the following shows:

- Pulse 95 ( Sharjah Broadcasting Authority )
- Men El Akher
- Ya Halla (Rotana)
- Saba Al Kheir Ya’Arab (MBC)
- MBC this week
- Inside the Middle East
- Al Forsah (Sama Dubai)
- Studio One (Dubai One)
- BBC World News
- Spotlight (OSN)

== WWE ==
In 2017, Moein Al Bastaki became a TV presenter of a new weekly Arabic show WWE Wal3ooha on MBC Action. Titled WWE Wal3ooha, meaning ‘light it up’, the weekly show sees presenters Moein Al Bastaki and Nathalie Mamo delivering exclusive interviews, highlights and stories from the week’s key matches to WWE fans in the region.

== Additional sources ==
- Emirati illusionist plans to open magic school in Dubai
- Tempo Planet "Magical Moein"
- Time Out Dubai "Moein Al Bastaki: UAE's only magician"
- Moein Al Bastaki Wows Travolta
- FirstPost "Moein Al Bastaki Performing a magic trick with the WWE Superstar John Cena in Dubai & Abu Dhabi "
- Magicaean World Magic News "Dubai based magician Moein Al Bastaki recently posted this encounter with private airline pilot and actor John Travolta."
- Khaleej Times "Passion not an illusion"
- WWE Wal3ooha will take fans to the heart of the WWE Universe - Presented by Moein Al Bastaki and Nathalie Mamo for the region, from the region
- WWE and OSN announce new weekly Arabic show WWE Wal3ooha
