= Moinabad, Fasa =

Moinabad معين اباد
- Village
- Location within Iran
- Coordinates: 29°08′40″N 53°27′12″E
- Country: Iran
- Province: Fars
- County: Fasa
- Bakhsh: Central
- Rural District: Jangal

Population (2006)
  - Total: 73
- Time zone: UTC+3:30 (IRST)
  - Summer (DST): UTC+4:30 (IRDT)

Moinabad (Persian: معين اباد, also Romanized as Mo‘īnābād) is a village in Jangal Rural District, in the Central District of Fasa County, Fars province, Iran. At the 2006 census, its population was 73, in 21 families.
