= Darabad, Tehran =

Neighbourhood in Tehran, Iran

Darabad (Persian: دارآباد) is a quarter in northeastern Tehran, the capital city of Iran.

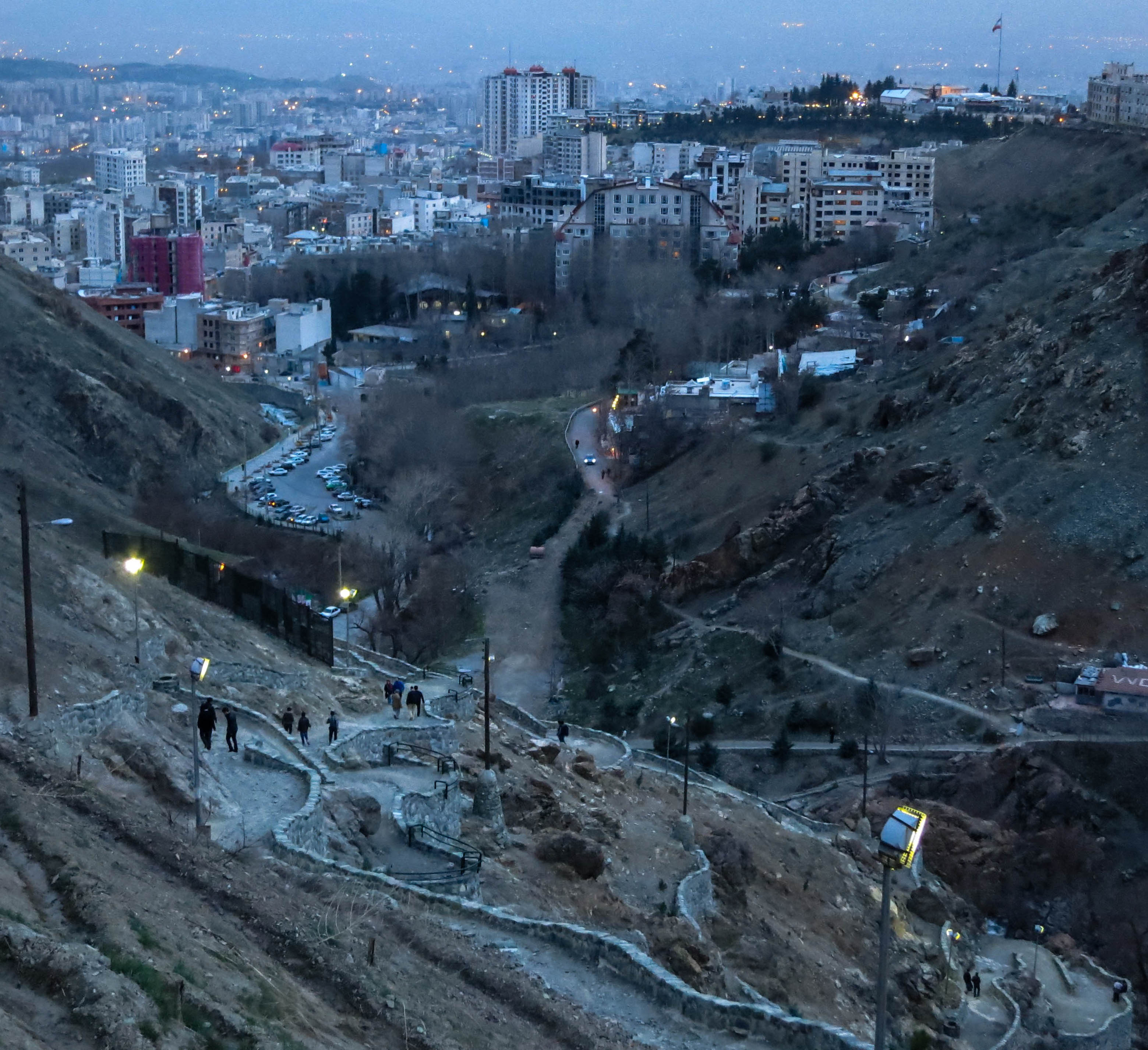
Darabad at dawn, 2013

Darabad is a former village and a summit on the slopes of the Alborz mountain range to the northeast of Tehran, which has become part of the Greater Tehran area as a result of rapid expansion of the Tehran metropolis. Many people use Darabad as the starting point for hiking the southern slopes of Alborz, especially in the summer.

== Museum of Wildlife Natural Monuments of Iran ==
The Museum of Wildlife and Natural Monuments of Iran is one of the museums of Tehran province. It is located at the beginning of Darabad and Ajudanieh streets in Museum Street. Its location was one of the palaces of Princess Fatemeh Pahlavi, which was built for guests but never used, and after the 1979 Iranian Revolution, with changes for public use, it became a museum focused on the nature of Iran. This museum was inaugurated in 1993 by the Municipality of Tehran. The museum has a two floors building with 2500 square meters of infrastructure on a land area of 12,000 square meters, and has several sections, which are:

Aquatic, Birds and Mammals Section

- Salon of European, Asian and North American specimens with species of deer, North American brown bear and mouse, Asian and Siberian birds and tigers.
- Two salons of specimens of mammals, birds and aquatic animals of Iran with species of deer, whole and ram, pheasant, bear, leopard, jackal, fox, wolf and feline small and large.
- Salon of specimens of mammals and birds of the African continent.
- Salon of aquatics and reptiles which are live and taxidermy.
- Large live cat cages, such as Persian leopards and African lions and leopards, and small bird and mammal cages inside the exhibition grounds and on the museum grounds.

Museum activities include:

- Publication of many useful books in the field of environment for children and adolescents as well as for academic reference. Including the collection "My Beautiful Animals", "Fish of Inland Waters of Iran", Ecology.
- Training classes for students in different age groups are held during the summer in collaboration with NGOs and active volunteers to increase environmental awareness.
- Child and Nature Festival, which is held on the occasion of International Children's Day for a week. During this period, with free entry for children, happy and fun programs with an educational focus on environmental protection are held for them.
- World Museum Day, with free admission for the general public.
- The International Cartoon Festival of Man and Nature with the theme of global protection of the earth and the environment, which was held with the active participation of internationally renowned cartoonists.
- Holding nature tours with a focus on education and public awareness to protect the environment.

== Darabad Palace ==
Darabad Palace
- Interactive map of the Darabad Palace area

Darabad Palace, alternatively Mozaffari Palace (Persian: کاخ مظفری دارآباد, Kākh-e Mozaffari-ye Dārābād) is a late-19th-century historic royal mansion located in the Darabad. Built from stone and concrete, the structure was later named after its founder, Mozaffar ad-Din Shah Qajar, who commissioned the estate as a private royal residence for the Qajar dynasty.

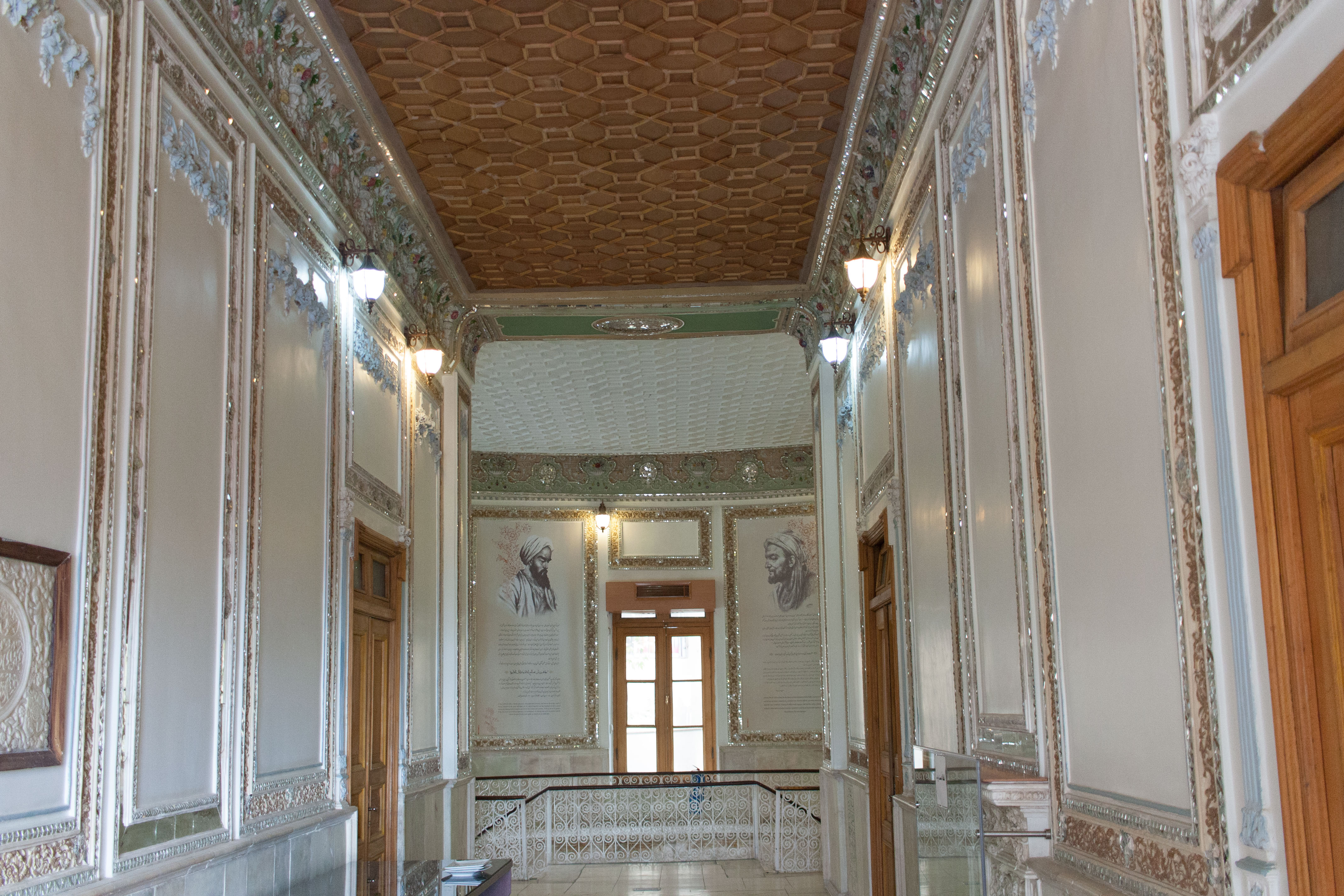
