= Central District (Tafresh County) =

District in Markazi province, Iran

Central District (Tafresh County) Persian: بخش مرکزی شهرستان تفرش
- District
- Location within Iran
- Coordinates: 34°48′N 49°53′E
- Country: Iran
- Province: Markazi
- County: Tafresh
- Capital: Tafresh

Population (2016)
  - Total: 24,913
- Time zone: UTC+3:30 (IRST)

The Central District of Tafresh County (Persian: بخش مرکزی شهرستان تفرش) is in Markazi province, Iran. Its capital is the city of Tafresh.

== Demographics ==
=== Population ===
At the time of the 2006 National Census, the district's population was 23,938 in 7,647 households. The following census in 2011 counted 25,912 people in 8,372 households. The 2016 census measured the population of the district as 24,913 inhabitants in 8,588 households.

=== Administrative divisions ===
Central District (Tafresh County) Population
Administrative Divisions	2006	2011	2016
Bazarjan RD	3,779	3,540	3,429
Kharrazan RD	1,102	1,303	861
Kuh Panah RD	1,487	1,334	1,114
Rudbar RD	3,656	3,288	3,016
Tafresh (city)	13,914	16,447	16,493
Total	23,938	25,912	24,913
RD = Rural District
