= Markazi province =

Province of Iran

Markazi Province استان مرکزی (Persian)
- Province
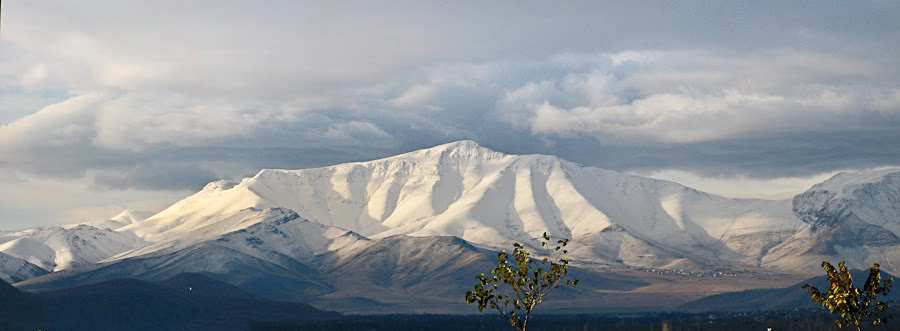
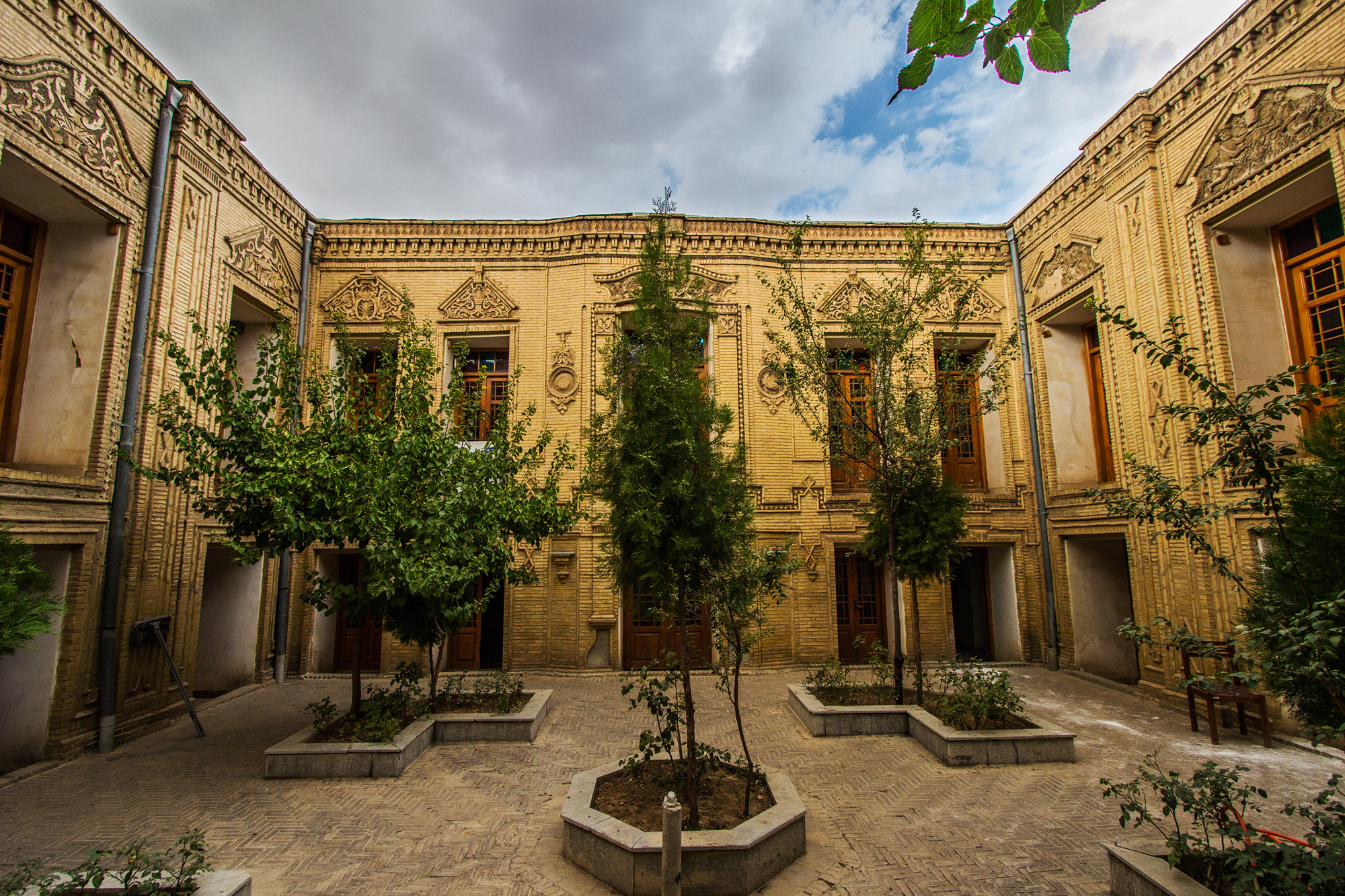
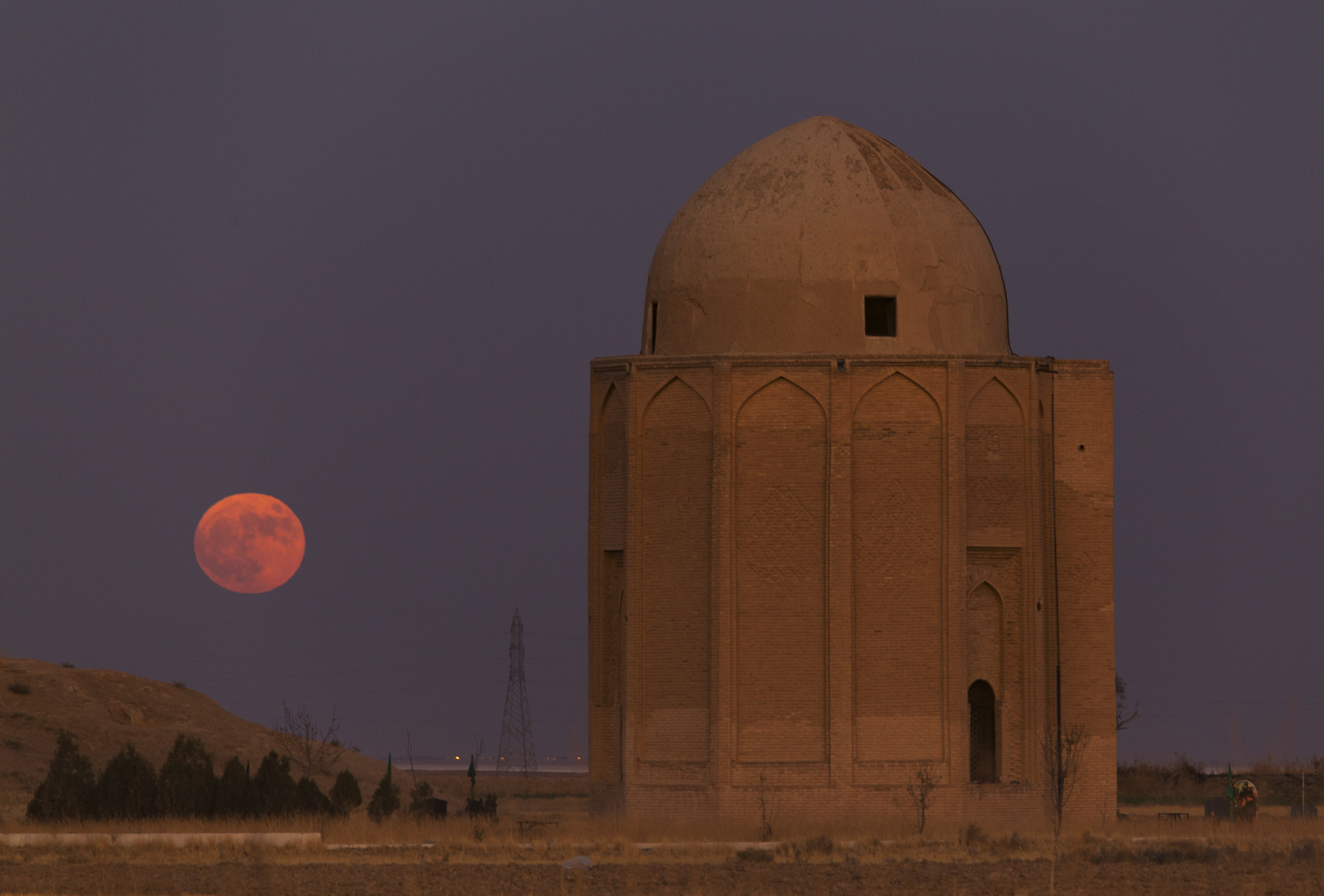
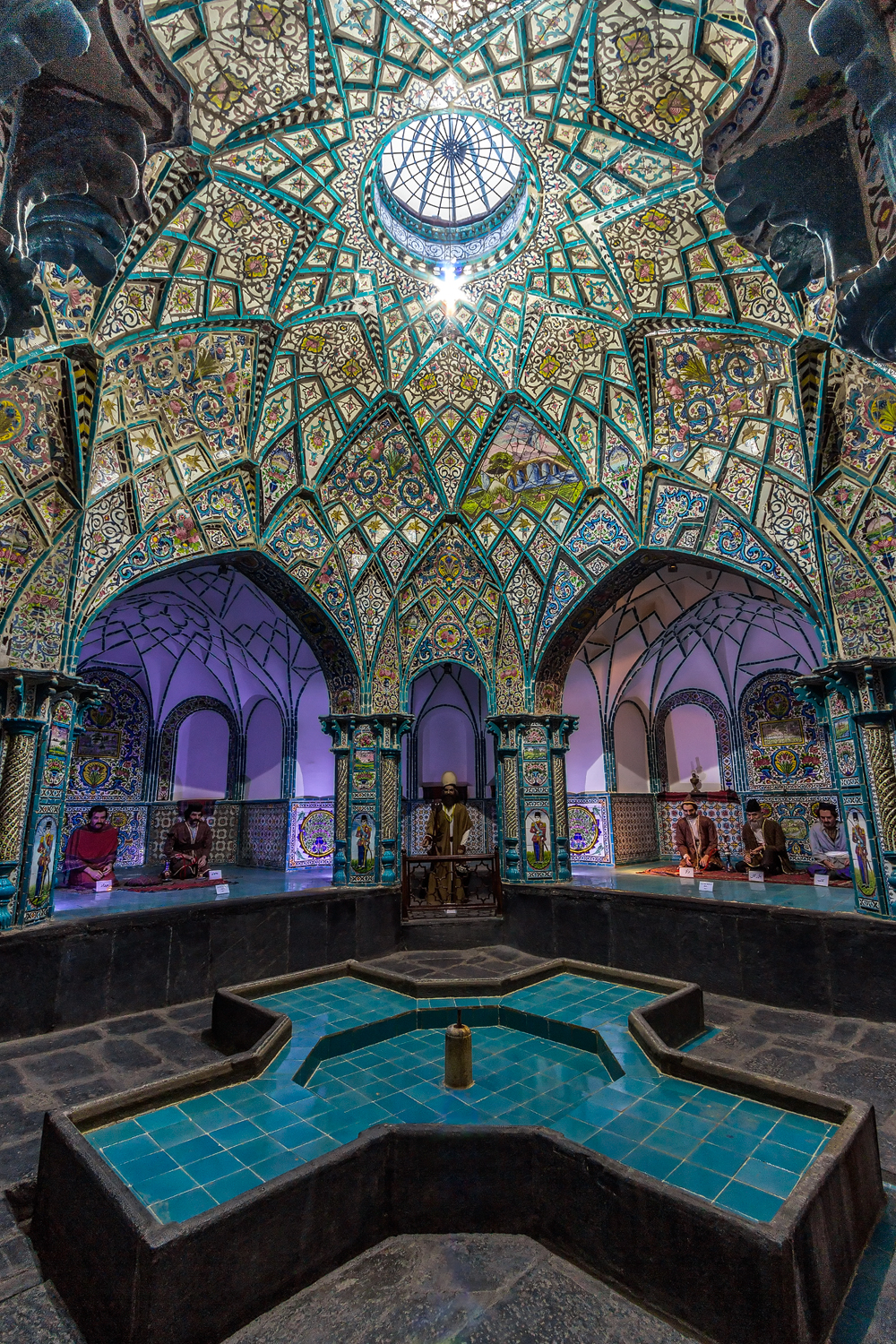
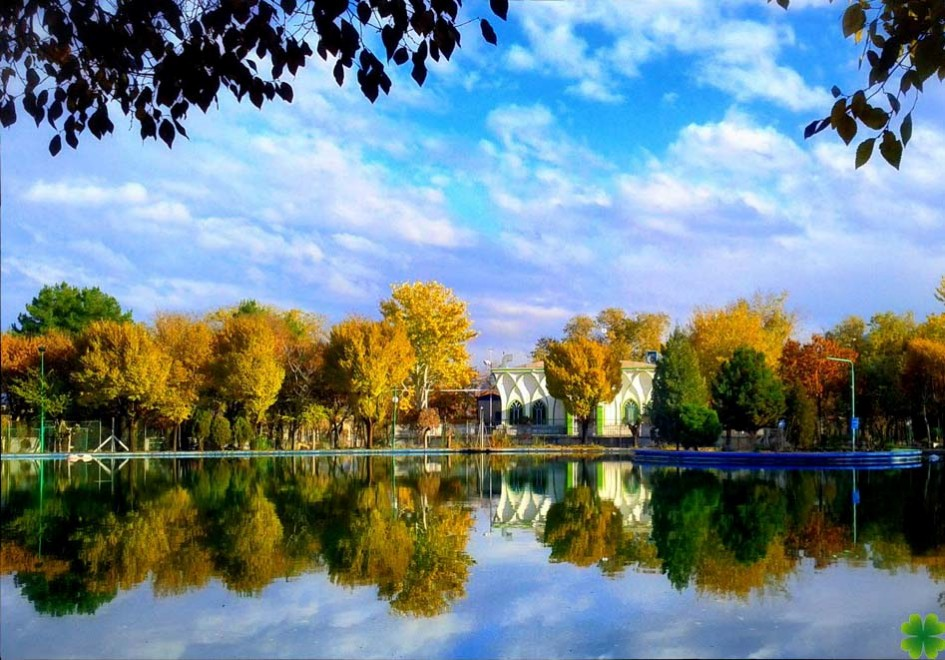
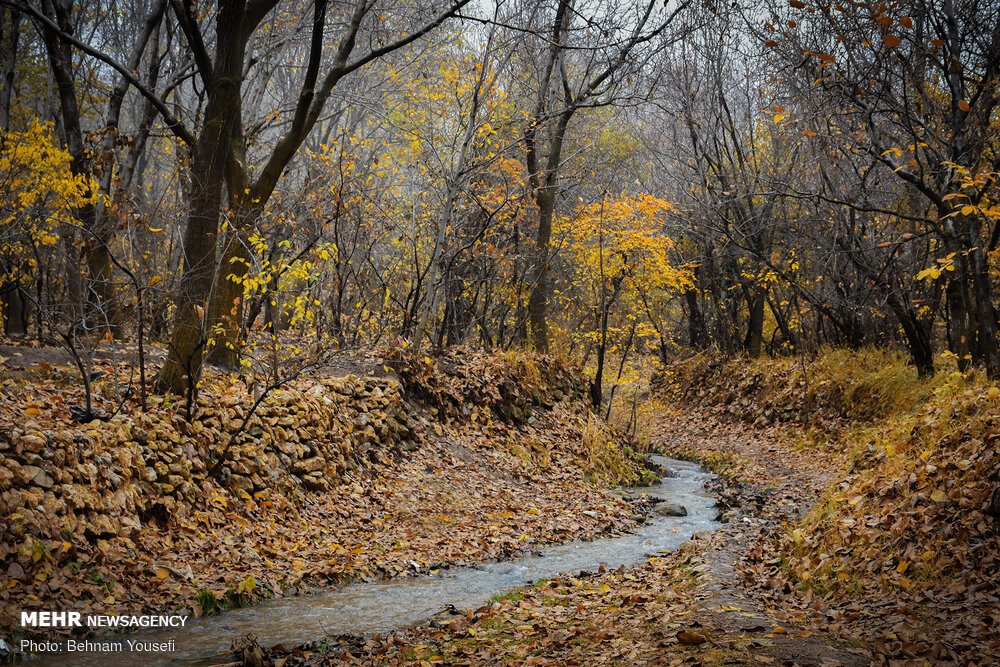
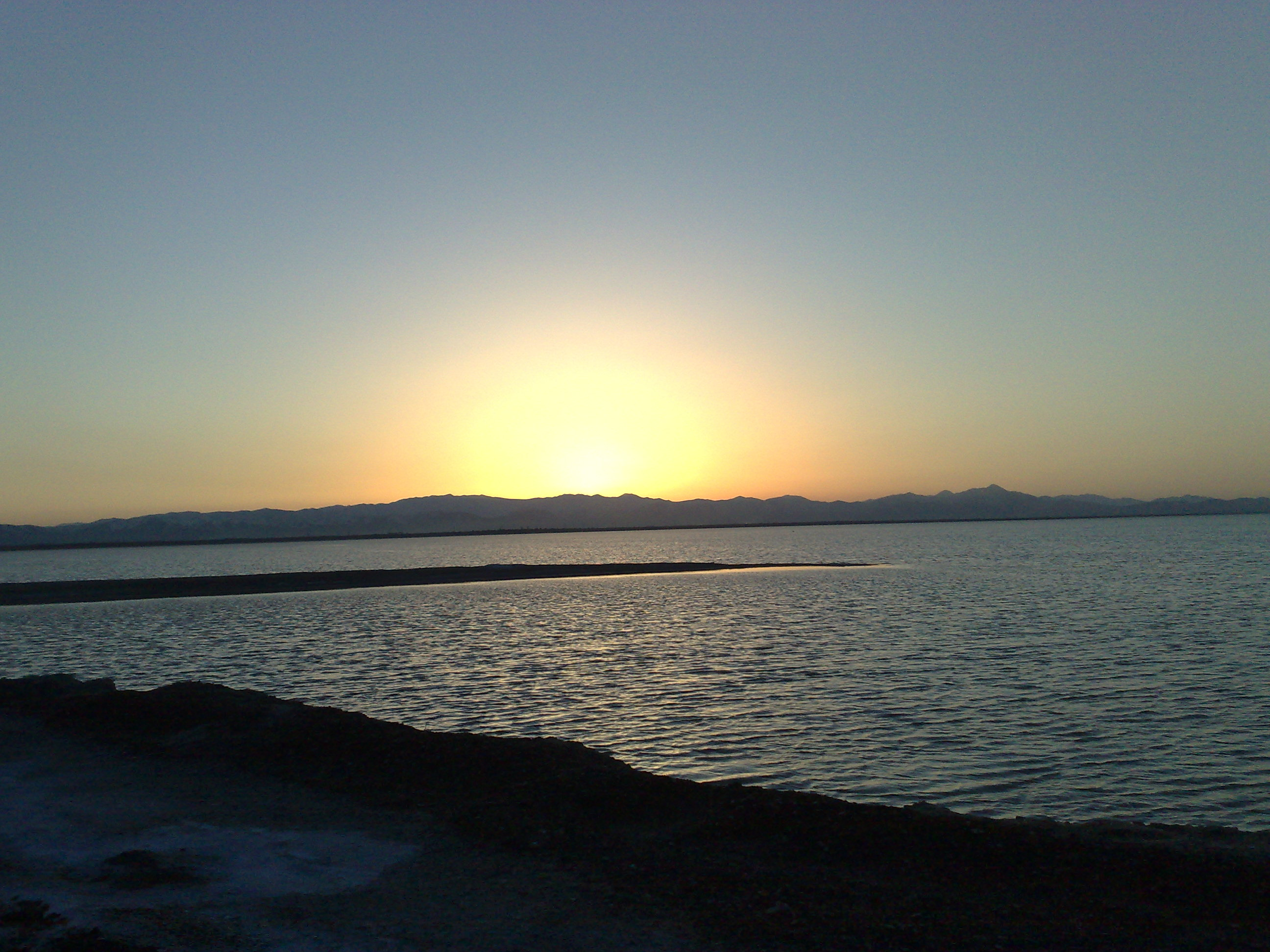
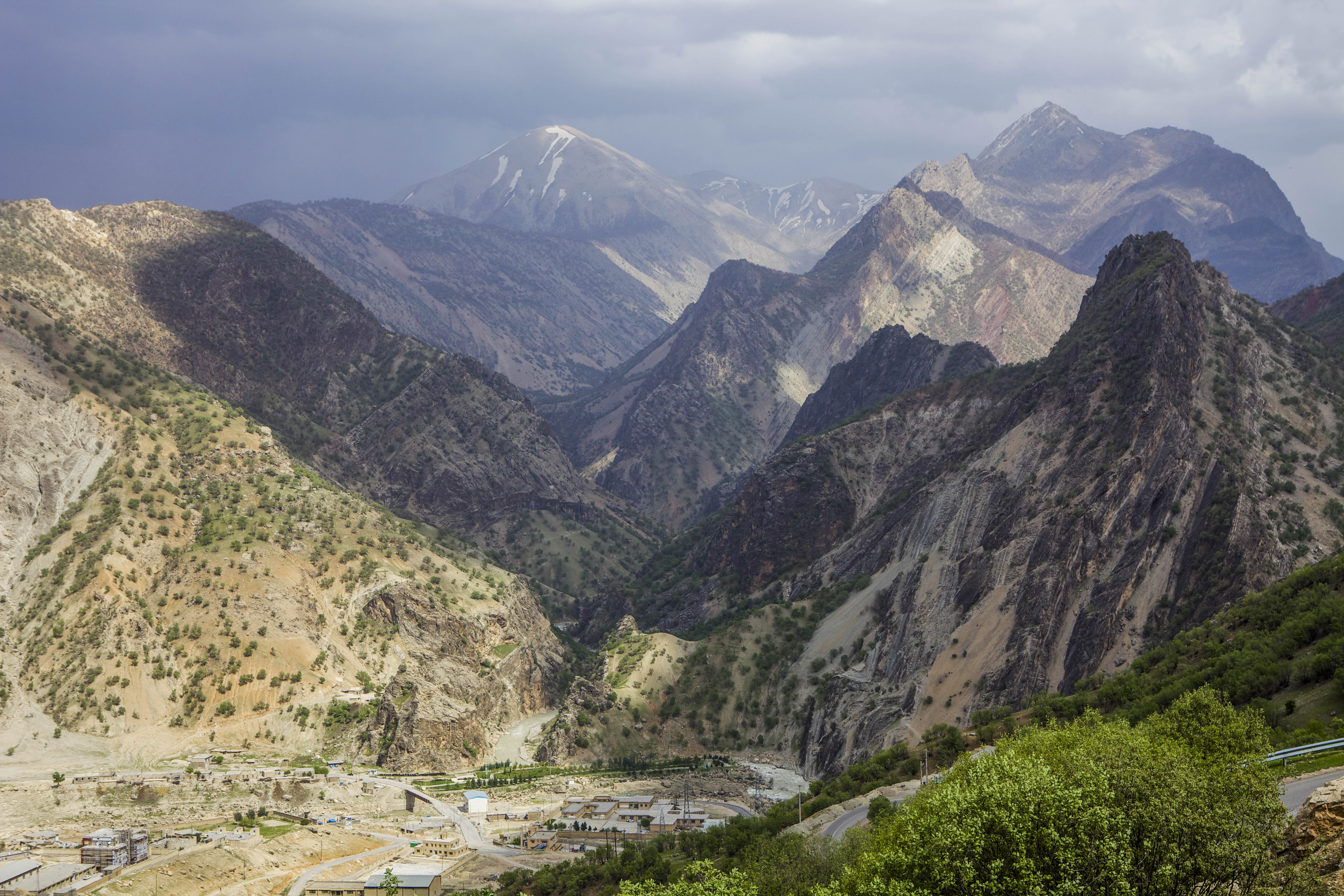
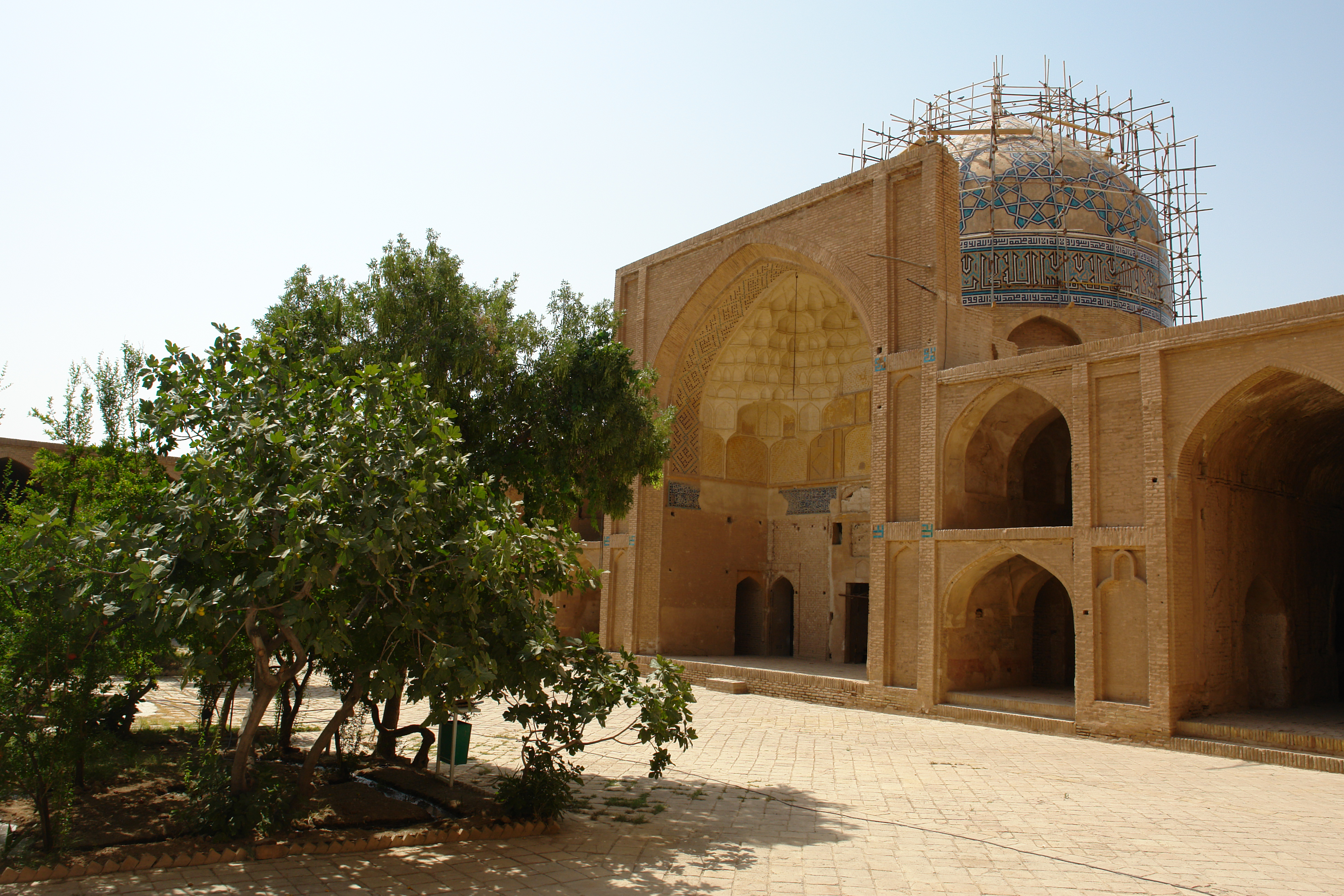

- Location of Markazi province within Iran
- Coordinates: 34°35′N 49°41′E
- Country: Iran
- Region: Region 4
- Capital: Arak
- Counties: 12

Government
  - Governor-general: Mahdi Zandiyeh Vakili (Independent)

Area
  - Total: 29,127 km^{2} (11,246 sq mi)

Population (2016)
  - Total: 1,429,475
  - Density: 49.077/km^{2} (127.11/sq mi)
- Time zone: UTC+03:30 (IRST)
- Area code: 86
- Main language(s): Persian
- HDI (2018): 0.791 high · 15th

Markazi province (Persian: استان مرکزی) (Note: Also romanized as Ostān-e Markazi; the Persian word markazi means "central" in English, as the province lies in central Iran) is one of the 31 provinces of Iran. Its capital is the city of Arak. The present borders of the province date to 1977, when the province was split into the current Markazi and Tehran provinces, with portions being annexed by Isfahan, Semnan, and Zanjan Provinces. In 2014, the province was placed in Region 4.

== History ==
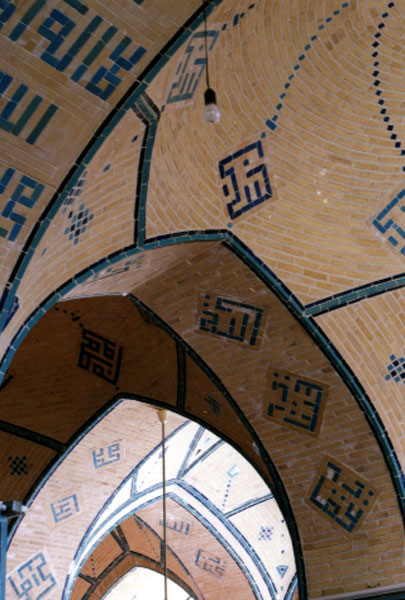
The Congregation Mosque of Narāgh

Markazi province was part of the Median Empire in the first millennium BC, which included all of the central and western parts of modern-day Iran. The region is considered to be one of the ancient settlements on the Iranian plateau. Numerous remaining ruins testify to the antiquity of this area.

In the early centuries of Islam, the name of the area was changed to Jibal or Kuhestan. By the early 10th century, Khorheh had become a famous city of Jibal province, followed by Tafresh and Khomein.

In recent times, the expansion of the north–south railroad (commonly known as the Persian Corridor) and the establishment of major industries have helped boost development in the area.

== Demographics ==
=== Ethnicity ===
Persians make up the vast majority of the province, but there are also smaller minorities of Azerbaijanis, Kurds, Lurs, etc.

=== Population ===
At the time of the 2006 National Census, the province's population was 1,326,826 in 364,155 households. The following census in 2011 counted 1,413,959 people in 426,613 households. The 2016 census measured the population of the province as 1,429,475 in 455,866 households.

=== Administrative divisions ===

The population history and structural changes of Markazi province's administrative divisions over three consecutive censuses are shown in the following table.

Markazi province
Counties	2006	2011	2016
Arak	602,971	599,634	591,756
Ashtian	19,011	17,105	16,357
Delijan	43,388	48,986	51,621
Farahan (Note: Separated from Komijan County and Tafresh County after the 2006 census)	—	30,042	28,994
Khomeyn	108,840	107,368	105,017
Khondab (Note: Separated from Arak County after the 2006 census)	—	58,262	54,018
Komijan	45,296	39,340	36,441
Mahallat	48,458	53,381	55,342
Saveh	235,843	259,030	283,538
Shazand	118,789	117,746	117,571
Tafresh	46,680	25,912	24,913
Zarandieh	57,550	57,153	63,907
Total	1,326,826	1,413,959	1,429,475

=== Cities ===
According to the 2016 census, 1,099,764 people (over 76% of the population of Markazi province) live in the following cities:

City	Population
Arak	520,944
Ashtian	8,763
Astaneh	7,166
Aveh	3,906
Delijan	40,902
Davudabad	5,491
Farmahin	5,756
Gharqabad	5,375
Hendudur	1,918
Javersiyan	4,993
Karchan	3,743
Khenejin	3,235
Khomeyn	72,882
Khondab	7,810
Khoshkrud	5,246
Komijan	8,776
Mahajeran	20,346
Mahallat	43,245
Mamuniyeh	21,814
Milajerd	9,288
Naraq	2,592
Nimvar	7,507
Nowbaran	3,334
Parandak	6,886
Qurchi Bashi	1,374
Razeghi	826
Saruq	1,345
Saveh	220,762
Shahbaz	7,536
Shazand	21,181
Tafresh	16,493
Tureh	2,302
Zavieh	6,027

== Colleges and universities ==
1. Arak University of Medical Sciences
2. Arak University of Technology
3. University of Arak
4. Tafresh University
5. Islamic Azad University of Khomein
6. Islamic Azad University of Arak
7. Islamic Azad University of Saveh
8. Islamic Azad University of Farahan
9. Islamic Azad University of Ashtian
10. Islamic Azad University of Tafresh
11. Farhangian University of Arak
12. Energy University (Saveh)

== Notable people ==
Many figures in Iranian history trace their origins to this province. namely: Mirza Abu'l-Qasem Qa'em-Maqam, Abbas Eqbal Ashtiani, Mirza Taqi Khan Amir Kabir, Mirza Bozorg Qa'em-Maqam, Mahmoud Hessabi, Ayatollah Khomeini, Ayatollah Araki, and many others.

== Gallery ==
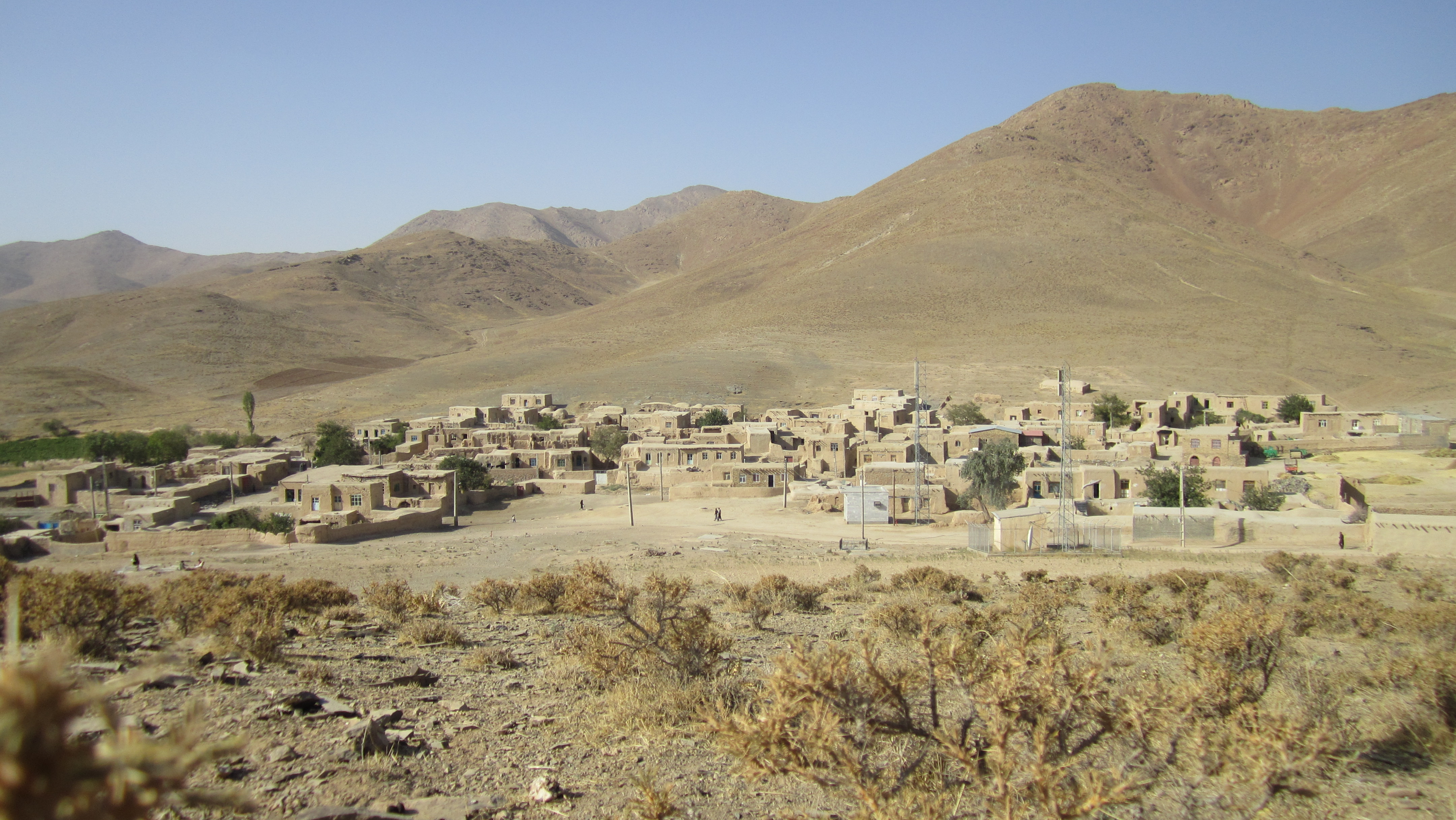
Kharpahlou Village

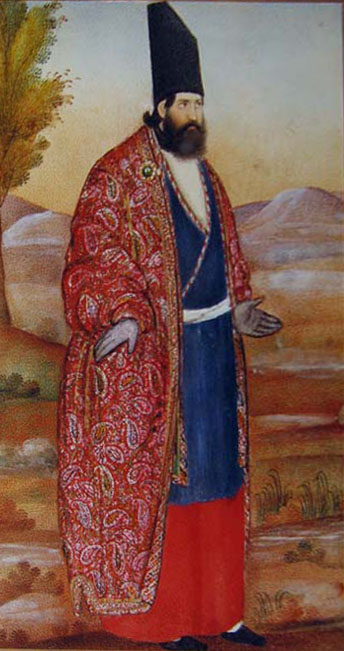
Painting attributed to Amir Kabir, National Museum of Iran

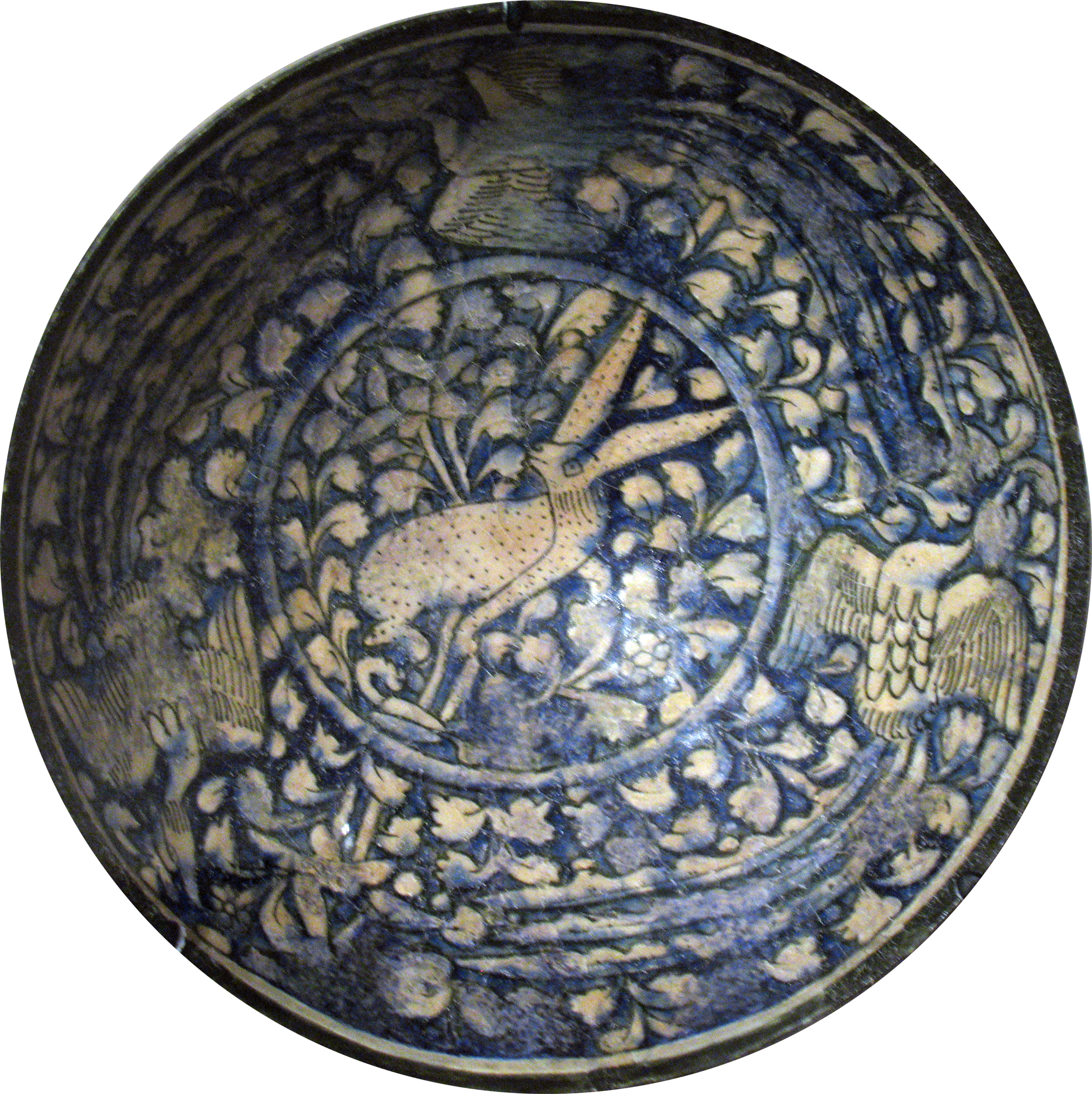
14th century ceramic bowl with hare and flying Simurghs from Sultanabad (today Arak)

== See also ==
Media related to Markazi Province at Wikimedia Commons
