= Talkhab =

Talkhab (Persian: تلخاب) may refer to various places in Iran:

== Bushehr Province ==
- Talkhab, Bushehr
- Talkhab-e Riz, Bushehr Province

== East Azerbaijan Province ==
- Talkhab, East Azerbaijan, a village in Hashtrud County

== Fars Province ==
- Talkhab, Doshman Ziari, a village in Mamasani County
- Talkhab, Mahvarmilani, a village in Mamasani County
- Talkhab-e Olya, Fars, a village in Rostam County
- Talkhab-e Sofla, a village in Rostam County

== Ilam Province ==
- Talkhab, Dustan, Darreh Shahr County, Ilam Province
- Talkhab, Hendmini, Darreh Shahr County, Ilam Province

== Kohgiluyeh and Boyer-Ahmad Province ==
- Talkhab-e Dishmuk
- Talkhab-e Magher
- Talkhab-e Olya, Kohgiluyeh and Boyer-Ahmad
- Talkhab-e Shirin
- Talkhab-e Sofla Bidak
- Talkhab Rural District, an administrative division of Basht County

== Khuzestan Province ==
- Talkhab, Izeh, Khuzestan Province
- Talkhab, Susan, Khuzestan Province
- Talkhab-e Ahmadi, Khuzestan Province
- Talkhab-e Hamzeh Ali, Khuzestan Province
- Talkhab-e Khun Ali, Khuzestan Province
- Talkhab-e Nazer, Khuzestan Province
- Talkhab-e Taj od Din, Khuzestan Province
- Talkhab-e Zardpatak, Khuzestan Province

== Markazi Province ==
- Talkhab, Markazi, Markazi Province

== Semnan Province ==
- Talkhab, Semnan

== West Azerbaijan Province ==
- Talkhab, West Azerbaijan, a village in Miandoab County

== Zanjan Province ==
- Talkhab, Zanjan, a village in Zanjan County
- Talkhab, Zanjanrud, a village in Zanjan County

== See also ==
- Talkh Ab (disambiguation), various places in Iran
