= Talkh Ab =

Talkh Ab (Persian: تلخ اب) may refer to various places in Iran:

- Talkh Ab, Bushehr
- Talkh Ab-e Riz, Bushehr Province
- Talkh Ab, Jahrom, Fars Province
- Talkh Ab, Kazerun, Fars Province
- Talkh Ab-e Valad, Mamasani County, Fars Province
- Talkh Ab, Ilam
- Talkh Ab-e Ahmadzadeh, Kohgiluyeh and Boyer-Ahmad Province
- Talkh Ab-e Pain, Kohgiluyeh and Boyer-Ahmad Province
- Talkh Ab-e Shirin, Kohgiluyeh and Boyer-Ahmad Province
- Talkh Ab, Markazi
- Talkh Ab, Zanjan
- Talkh Ab-e Zardpatak, Khuzestan Province
- Talkh Ab Rural District, in Markazi Province

== See also ==
- Talkhab (disambiguation), various places in Iran
