= Majidabad =

Majidabad (Persian: مجيداباد) may refer to:

- Majidabad, Nir, Ardabil Province
- Majidabad, Parsabad, Ardabil Province
- Majidabad, Ahar, East Azerbaijan Province
- Majidabad, Malekan, East Azerbaijan Province
- Majidabad, Hamadan
- Majidabad, Khuzestan
- Majidabad, Kamyaran, Kurdistan Province
- Majidabad, Khondab, Markazi Province
- Majidabad, Mazandaran
- Majidabad, Qazvin
- Majidabad, Qom
- Majidabad, Zanjan

== See also ==
- Majdabad (disambiguation)
