= Arezumand =

Village in Markazi province, Iran

Arezumand Persian: ارزومند
- Village
- Location within Iran
- Coordinates: 34°45′35″N 49°39′28″E
- Country: Iran
- Province: Markazi
- County: Farahan
- District: Khenejin
- Rural District: Talkh Ab

Population (2016)
  - Total: 318
- Time zone: UTC+3:30 (IRST)

Arezumand (Persian: ارزومند) (Note: Also romanized as Ārezūmand and Ārzūmand) is a village in Talkh Ab Rural District of Khenejin District in Farahan County, Markazi province, Iran.

== Demographics ==
=== Population ===
At the time of the 2006 National Census, the village's population was 434 in 117 households, when it was in Feshk Rural District of the former Farahan District in Tafresh County. The following census in 2011 counted 354 people in 107 households, by which time the district had been separated from the county in the establishment of Farahan County. The rural district was transferred to the new Central District, and Arezumand was transferred to Talkh Ab Rural District created in the new Khenejin District. The 2016 census measured the population of the village as 318 people in 110 households.
