= Abbasabad, Farahan =

Village in Markazi province, Iran

Abbasabad Persian: عباس اباد
- Village
- Location within Iran
- Coordinates: 34°38′40″N 49°33′27″E
- Country: Iran
- Province: Markazi
- County: Farahan
- District: Khenejin
- Rural District: Talkh Ab

Population (2016)
  - Total: 280
- Time zone: UTC+3:30 (IRST)

Abbasabad (Persian: عباس اباد) (Note: Also romanized as ‘Abbāsābād) is a village in Talkh Ab Rural District of Khenejin District in Farahan County, Markazi province, Iran.

== Demographics ==
=== Population ===
At the time of the 2006 National Census, the village's population was 280 in 62 households, when it was in Farmahin Rural District of the former Farahan District in Tafresh County. The following census in 2011 counted 278 people in 66 households, by which time the district had been separated from the county in the establishment of Farahan County. The rural district was transferred to the new Central District, and Abbasabad was transferred to Talkh Ab Rural District created in the new Khenejin District. The 2016 census measured the population of the village as 280 people in 71 households.
