= Amirabad, Farahan =

Village in Markazi province, Iran

Amirabad Persian: اميراباد
- Village
- Location within Iran
- Coordinates: 34°38′59″N 49°31′30″E
- Country: Iran
- Province: Markazi
- County: Farahan
- District: Khenejin
- Rural District: Talkh Ab

Population (2016)
  - Total: 764
- Time zone: UTC+3:30 (IRST)

Amirabad (Persian: اميراباد) (Note: Also romanized as Amīrābād) is a village in Talkh Ab Rural District of Khenejin District in Farahan County, Markazi province, Iran.

== Demographics ==
=== Population ===
At the time of the 2006 National Census, the village's population was 954 in 222 households, when it was in Farmahin Rural District of the former Farahan District in Tafresh County. The following census in 2011 counted 1,009 people in 274 households, by which time the district had been separated from the county in the establishment of Farahan County. The rural district was transferred to the new Central District, and Amirabad was transferred to Talkh Ab Rural District created in the new Khenejin District. The 2016 census measured the population of the village as 764 people in 237 households.
