= Chaqqar =

Village in Markazi province, Iran

Chaqqar Persian: چاقر
- Village
- Location within Iran
- Coordinates: 34°42′04″N 49°42′42″E
- Country: Iran
- Province: Markazi
- County: Farahan
- District: Khenejin
- Rural District: Talkh Ab

Population (2016)
  - Total: 171
- Time zone: UTC+3:30 (IRST)

Chaqqar (Persian: چاقر) (Note: Also romanized as Chāqar and Chāqqar) is a village in Talkh Ab Rural District of Khenejin District in Farahan County, Markazi province, Iran.

== Demographics ==
=== Population ===
At the time of the 2006 National Census, the village's population was 229 in 66 households, when it was in Feshk Rural District of the former Farahan District in Tafresh County. The following census in 2011 counted 164 people in 57 households, by which time the district had been separated from the county in the establishment of Farahan County. The rural district was transferred to the new Central District, and Chaqqar was transferred to Talkh Ab Rural District created in the new Khenejin District. The 2016 census measured the population of the village as 171 people in 58 households.
