= Kazemabad, Farahan =

Village in Markazi province, Iran

Kazemabad Persian: كاظماباد
- Village
- Location within Iran
- Coordinates: 34°37′29″N 49°40′45″E
- Country: Iran
- Province: Markazi
- County: Farahan
- District: Central
- Rural District: Feshk

Population (2016)
  - Total: 64
- Time zone: UTC+3:30 (IRST)

Kazemabad (Persian: كاظماباد) (Note: Also romanized as Kāz̧emābād; also known as Kāzimābād) is a village in Feshk Rural District of the Central District in Farahan County, Markazi province, Iran.

== Demographics ==
=== Population ===
At the time of the 2006 National Census, the village's population was 110 in 31 households, when it was in the former Farahan District of Tafresh County. The following census in 2011 counted 88 people in 23 households, by which time the district had been separated from the county in the establishment of Farahan County. The rural district was transferred to the new Central District. The 2016 census measured the population of the village as 64 people in 23 households.

== Geography ==
Kazemabad is located in the center of Iran, southwest of the capital, Tehran.
