= Tabarteh =

Village in Markazi province, Iran

Tabarteh Persian: تبرته
- Village
- Location within Iran
- Coordinates: 34°31′14″N 49°30′44″E
- Country: Iran
- Province: Markazi
- County: Farahan
- District: Central
- Rural District: Farmahin

Population (2016)
  - Total: 786
- Time zone: UTC+3:30 (IRST)

Tabarteh (Persian: تبرته) is a village in Farmahin Rural District of the Central District in Farahan County, Markazi province, Iran.

== Demographics ==
=== Population ===
At the time of the 2006 National Census, the village's population was 1,064 in 251 households, when it was in the former Farahan District of Tafresh County. The following census in 2011 counted 878 people in 258 households, by which time the district had been separated from the county in the establishment of Farahan County. The rural district was transferred to the new Central District. The 2016 census measured the population of the village as 786 people in 250 households.
