= Dermanak, Markazi =

Village in Markazi province, Iran

Dermanak Persian: درمنك
- Village
- Location within Iran
- Coordinates: 34°36′04″N 49°45′55″E
- Country: Iran
- Province: Markazi
- County: Farahan
- District: Central
- Rural District: Feshk

Population (2016)
  - Total: 132
- Time zone: UTC+3:30 (IRST)

Dermanak (Persian: درمنك) (Note: Also romanized as Darmank and Dormonak; also known as Dirmanik) is a village in Feshk Rural District of the Central District in Farahan County, Markazi province, Iran.

== Demographics ==
=== Population ===
At the time of the 2006 National Census, the village's population was 173 in 63 households, when it was in the former Farahan District of Tafresh County. The following census in 2011 counted 131 people in 52 households, by which time the district had been separated from the county in the establishment of Farahan County. The rural district was transferred to the new Central District. The 2016 census measured the population of the village as 132 people in 52 households.
