= Vasheqan =

Village in Markazi province, Iran

Vasheqan Persian: واشقان
- Village
- Location within Iran
- Coordinates: 34°39′54″N 49°49′09″E
- Country: Iran
- Province: Markazi
- County: Farahan
- District: Central
- Rural District: Feshk

Population (2016)
  - Total: 76
- Time zone: UTC+3:30 (IRST)

Vasheqan (Persian: واشقان) (Note: Also romanized as Vāshaqān, Vāsheqān, and Vāshqān; also known as Vasheghan, Vāsheqeh, and Wāshghān) is a village in Feshk Rural District of the Central District in Farahan County, Markazi province, Iran.

== Demographics ==
=== Language ===
All of the inhabitants of the village are ethnic Khalaj people who speak the endangered Khalaj language.

=== Population ===
At the time of the 2006 National Census, the village's population was 129 in 65 households, when it was in the former Farahan District of Tafresh County. The following census in 2011 counted 107 people in 57 households, by which time the district had been separated from the county in the establishment of Farahan County. The rural district was transferred to the new Central District. The 2016 census measured the population of the village as 76 people in 48 households.
