= Master, Iran =

Village in Markazi province, Iran

Master Persian: ماستر
- Village
- Location within Iran
- Coordinates: 34°37′48″N 49°46′38″E
- Country: Iran
- Province: Markazi
- County: Farahan
- District: Central
- Rural District: Feshk

Population (2016)
  - Total: 505
- Time zone: UTC+3:30 (IRST)

Master (Persian: ماستر) (Note: Also romanized as Māstar and Māster; also known as Moassar) is a village in Feshk Rural District of the Central District in Farahan County, Markazi province, Iran.

== Demographics ==
=== Population ===
At the time of the 2006 National Census, the village's population was 675 in 212 households, when it was in the former Farahan District of Tafresh County. The following census in 2011 counted 571 people in 195 households, by which time the district had been separated from the county in the establishment of Farahan County. The rural district was transferred to the new Central District. The 2016 census measured the population of the village as 505 people in 188 households.
