= Khosravan-e Olya =

Village in Markazi province, Iran

Khosravan-e Olya Persian: خسروان عليا
- Village
- Location within Iran
- Coordinates: 34°39′18″N 49°46′05″E
- Country: Iran
- Province: Markazi
- County: Farahan
- District: Central
- Rural District: Feshk

Population (2016)
  - Total: 71
- Time zone: UTC+3:30 (IRST)

Khosravan-e Olya (Persian: خسروان عليا) (Note: Also romanized as Khosravān-e ‘Olyā; also known as Khosravān-e Bālā) is a village in Feshk Rural District of the Central District in Farahan County, Markazi province, Iran.

== Demographics ==
=== Population ===
At the time of the 2006 National Census, the village's population was 77 in 32 households, when it was in the former Farahan District of Tafresh County. The following census in 2011 counted 68 people in 31 households, by which time the district had been separated from the county in the establishment of Farahan County. The rural district was transferred to the new Central District. The 2016 census measured the population of the village as 71 people in 32 households.
