= Ayr, Iran =

Village in Markazi province, Iran

Ayr Persian: اير
- Village
- Location within Iran
- Coordinates: 34°42′12″N 49°44′30″E
- Country: Iran
- Province: Markazi
- County: Farahan
- District: Central
- Rural District: Feshk

Population (2016)
  - Total: 150
- Time zone: UTC+3:30 (IRST)

Ayr (Persian: اير) (Note: Also known as Līr) is a village in Feshk Rural District of the Central District in Farahan County, Markazi province, Iran.

== Demographics ==
=== Population ===
At the time of the 2006 National Census, the village's population was 175 in 48 households, when it was in the former Farahan District of Tafresh County. The following census in 2011 counted 165 people in 50 households, by which time the district had been separated from the county in the establishment of Farahan County. The rural district was transferred to the new Central District. The 2016 census measured the population of the village as 150 people in 51 households.
