= Shotoriyeh =

Village in Markazi province, Iran

Shotoriyeh Persian: شتريه
- Village
- Location within Iran
- Coordinates: 34°35′35″N 49°37′17″E
- Country: Iran
- Province: Markazi
- County: Farahan
- District: Central
- Rural District: Farmahin

Population (2016)
  - Total: 361
- Time zone: UTC+3:30 (IRST)

Shotoriyeh (Persian: شتريه) (Note: Also romanized as Shotorīyeh; also known as Shotorgah) is a village in Farmahin Rural District of the Central District in Farahan County, Markazi province, Iran.

== Demographics ==
=== Population ===
At the time of the 2006 National Census, the village's population was 620 in 167 households, when it was in the former Farahan District of Tafresh County. The following census in 2011 counted 490 people in 149 households, by which time the district had been separated from the county in the establishment of Farahan County. The rural district was transferred to the new Central District. The 2016 census measured the population of the village as 361 people in 130 households.
