= Kordabad, Markazi =

Village in Markazi province, Iran

Kordabad Persian: كرداباد
- Village
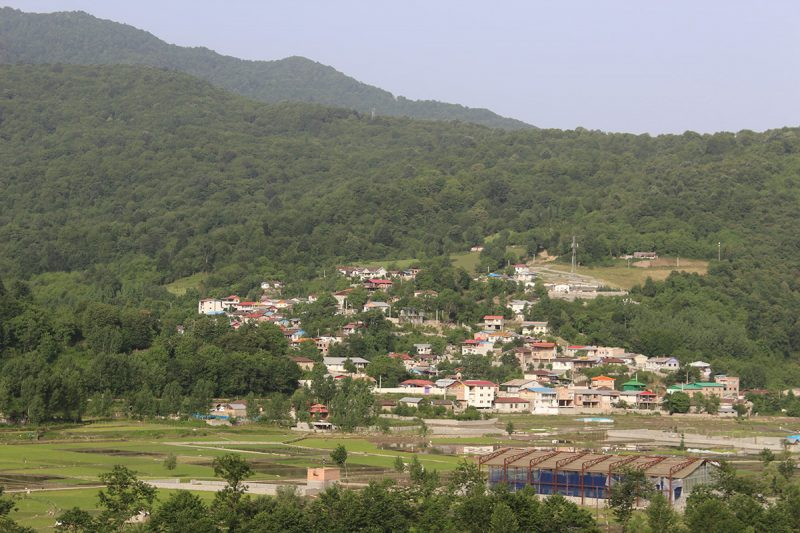
- The village of Kordabad

- Location within Iran
- Coordinates: 34°43′53″N 49°49′25″E
- Country: Iran
- Province: Markazi
- County: Farahan
- District: Central
- Rural District: Feshk

Population (2016)
  - Total: 19
- Time zone: UTC+3:30 (IRST)

Kordabad (Persian: كرداباد) (Note: Also romanized as Kordābād) is a village in Feshk Rural District of the Central District in Farahan County, Markazi province, Iran.

== Demographics ==
=== Population ===
At the time of the 2006 National Census, the village's population was 13 in six households, when it was in the former Farahan District of Tafresh County. The following census in 2011 once again counted 13 people in six households, by which time the district had been separated from the county in the establishment of Farahan County. The rural district was transferred to the new Central District. The 2016 census measured the population of the village as 19 people in eight households.
