= Aqa Ziarat =

Village in Markazi province, Iran

Aqa Ziarat Persian: اقازيارت
- Village
- Location within Iran
- Coordinates: 34°38′02″N 49°28′16″E
- Country: Iran
- Province: Markazi
- County: Farahan
- District: Central
- Rural District: Farmahin

Population (2016)
  - Total: 311
- Time zone: UTC+3:30 (IRST)

Aqa Ziarat (Persian: اقازيارت) (Note: Also romanized as Āqā Zeyārat, Āqā Zīārat, and Āqā Zīyārat; also known as Āqzīārat) is a village in Farmahin Rural District of the Central District in Farahan County, Markazi province, Iran.

== Demographics ==
=== Population ===
At the time of the 2006 National Census, the village's population was 402 in 99 households, when it was in the former Farahan District of Tafresh County. The following census in 2011 counted 307 people in 95 households, by which time the district had been separated from the county in the establishment of Farahan County. The rural district was transferred to the new Central District. The 2016 census measured the population of the village as 311 people in 103 households.
