= Ahangaran, Markazi =

Village in Markazi province, Iran

Ahangaran Persian: اهنگران
- Village
- Location within Iran
- Coordinates: 34°23′47″N 49°40′14″E
- Country: Iran
- Province: Markazi
- County: Farahan
- District: Central
- Rural District: Farmahin

Population (2016)
  - Total: 328
- Time zone: UTC+3:30 (IRST)

Ahangaran (Persian: اهنگران) (Note: Also romanized as Āhangarān) is a village in Farmahin Rural District of the Central District in Farahan County, Markazi province, Iran.

== Demographics ==
=== Population ===
At the time of the 2006 National Census, the village's population was 398 in 127 households, when it was in the former Farahan District of Tafresh County. The following census in 2011 counted 392 people in 135 households, by which time the district had been separated from the county in the establishment of Farahan County. The rural district was transferred to the new Central District. The 2016 census measured the population of the village as 328 people in 115 households.
