= Kudzar =

Village in Markazi province, Iran

Kudzar Persian: كودزر
- Village
- Location within Iran
- Coordinates: 34°33′32″N 49°30′29″E
- Country: Iran
- Province: Markazi
- County: Farahan
- District: Central
- Rural District: Farmahin

Population (2016)
  - Total: 612
- Time zone: UTC+3:30 (IRST)

Kudzar (Persian: كودزر) (Note: Also romanized as Kūdzar; also known as Koodraz, Kūdraz, and Kūzāl) is a village in Farmahin Rural District of the Central District in Farahan County, Markazi province, Iran.

== Demographics ==
=== Population ===
At the time of the 2006 National Census, the village's population was 744 in 221 households, when it was in the former Farahan District of Tafresh County. The following census in 2011 counted 682 people in 205 households, by which time the district had been separated from the county in the establishment of Farahan County. The rural district was transferred to the new Central District. The 2016 census measured the population of the village as 612 people in 215 households.
