= Guneh =

Village in Markazi province, Iran

Guneh Persian: گونه
- Village
- Location within Iran
- Coordinates: 34°37′39″N 49°49′47″E
- Country: Iran
- Province: Markazi
- County: Farahan
- District: Central
- Rural District: Feshk

Population (2016)
  - Total: 99
- Time zone: UTC+3:30 (IRST)

Guneh (Persian: گونه) (Note: Also romanized as Gūneh; also known as Goneh) is a village in Feshk Rural District of the Central District in Farahan County, Markazi province, Iran.

== Demographics ==
=== Population ===
At the time of the 2006 National Census, the village's population was 97 in 35 households, when it was in the former Farahan District of Tafresh County. The following census in 2011 counted 121 people in 38 households, by which time the district had been separated from the county in the establishment of Farahan County. The rural district was transferred to the new Central District. The 2016 census measured the population of the village as 99 people in 37 households.
