= Ghiasabad, Markazi =

Village in Markazi province, Iran

Ghiasabad Persian: غياث‌آباد
- Village
- Location within Iran
- Coordinates: 34°24′54″N 49°36′28″E
- Country: Iran
- Province: Markazi
- County: Farahan
- District: Central
- Rural District: Farmahin

Population (2016)
  - Total: 1,231
- Time zone: UTC+3:30 (IRST)

Ghiasabad (Persian: غياث‌آباد) (Note: Also romanized as Gheyāsābād and Ghīās̄ābād) is a village in Farmahin Rural District of the Central District in Farahan County, Markazi province, Iran.

== Demographics ==
=== Population ===
At the time of the 2006 National Census, the village's population was 1,333 in 364 households, when it was in the former Farahan District of Tafresh County. The following census in 2011 counted 1,344 people in 426 households, by which time the district had been separated from the county in the establishment of Farahan County. The rural district was transferred to the new Central District. The 2016 census measured the population of the village as 1,231 people in 392 households, the most populous in its rural district.
