= Dastjan =

Village in Markazi province, Iran

Dastjan Persian: دستجان
- Village
- Location within Iran
- Coordinates: 34°35′12″N 49°30′05″E
- Country: Iran
- Province: Markazi
- County: Farahan
- District: Central
- Rural District: Farmahin

Population (2016)
  - Total: 1,023
- Time zone: UTC+3:30 (IRST)

Dastjan (Persian: دستجان) (Note: Also romanized as Dastejān and Dastjān; also known as Dostkānd) is a village in Farmahin Rural District of the Central District in Farahan County, Markazi province, Iran.

== Demographics ==
=== Population ===
At the time of the 2006 National Census, the village's population was 1,263 in 365 households, when it was in the former Farahan District of Tafresh County. The following census in 2011 counted 1,240 people in 377 households, by which time the district had been separated from the county in the establishment of Farahan County. The rural district was transferred to the new Central District. The 2016 census measured the population of the village as 1,023 people in 368 households.
