= Mashhad (disambiguation) =

Mashhad is a city in Iran.

Mashhad (Persian: مشهد) may also refer to:

== Places ==
=== Iran ===
- Mashhad-e Kaveh, a village in Isfahan Province, Iran
- Mashhad, Khuzestan, a village in Khuzestan Province, Iran
- Mashhad ol Kubeh, a village in Markazi Province, Iran
- Mashhad-e Bazarjan, a village in Markazi Province, Iran
- Mashhad-e Miqan, a village in Markazi Province, Iran
- Mashhad-e Zolfabad, a village in Markazi Province, Iran
- Mashhad, Qazvin, a village in Qazvin Province, Iran
- Mashhad-e Ardehal, a village in Iran
- Mashhad-e Firuzkuh, a village in Tehran Province, Iran
- Mashhad County, a county (shahrestān) in Razavi Khorasan Province in Iran
- Mashhad-e Miqan Rural District, in Markazi Province, Iran

=== Elsewhere ===
- Mashhad, Afghanistan
- Mashhad, Israel, an Arab town in northern Israel

== Other uses ==
- Mashad (architecture), a Muslim mausoleum or shrine of a religious figure
