= Ziaabad, Farahan =

Village in Markazi province, Iran

Ziaabad Persian: ضيااباد
- Village
- Location within Iran
- Coordinates: 34°43′10″N 49°33′46″E
- Country: Iran
- Province: Markazi
- County: Farahan
- District: Khenejin
- Rural District: Talkh Ab

Population (2016)
  - Total: 338
- Time zone: UTC+3:30 (IRST)

Ziaabad (Persian: ضيااباد) (Note: Also romanized as Zeyā’ābād, Ẕīā’ābād, and Zīā’ābād; also known as Ziādābād) is a village in Talkh Ab Rural District of Khenejin District in Farahan County, Markazi province, Iran.

== Demographics ==
=== Population ===
At the time of the 2006 National Census, the village's population was 339 in 78 households, when it was in Khenejin Rural District of the Central District in Komijan County. The following census in 2011 counted 345 people in 102 households, by which time the rural district had been separated from the county in the establishment of Farahan County. The rural district was transferred to the new Khenejin District, and Ziaabad was transferred to Talkh Ab Rural District created in the same district. The 2016 census measured the population of the village as 338 people in 115 households.
