= Hafteh Khanak =

Village in Markazi province, Iran

Hafteh Khanak Persian: هفته خانك
- Village
- Location within Iran
- Coordinates: 34°40′45″N 49°30′35″E
- Country: Iran
- Province: Markazi
- County: Farahan
- District: Khenejin
- Rural District: Talkh Ab

Population (2016)
  - Total: 134
- Time zone: UTC+3:30 (IRST)

Hafteh Khanak (Persian: هفته خانك) (Note: Also romanized as Hafteh Khānak) is a village in Talkh Ab Rural District of Khenejin District in Farahan County, Markazi province, Iran.

== Demographics ==
=== Population ===
At the time of the 2006 National Census, the village's population was 177 in 39 households, when it was in Khenejin Rural District of the Central District in Komijan County. The following census in 2011 counted 144 people in 36 households, by which time the rural district had been separated from the county in the establishment of Farahan County. The rural district was transferred to the new Khenejin District, and Hafteh Khanak was transferred to Talkh Ab Rural District created in the same district. The 2016 census measured the population of the village as 134 people in 38 households.
