= Majdabad-e Kohneh =

Village in Markazi province, Iran

Majdabad-e Kohneh Persian: مجدابادكهنه
- Village
- Location within Iran
- Coordinates: 34°32′18″N 49°42′51″E
- Country: Iran
- Province: Markazi
- County: Farahan
- District: Central
- Rural District: Farmahin

Population (2016)
  - Total: 403
- Time zone: UTC+3:30 (IRST)

Majdabad-e Kohneh (Persian: مجدابادكهنه) (Note: Also romanized as Majdābād-e Kohneh; also known as Majd Ābād and Mujdābād Kūhneh) is a village in Farmahin Rural District of the Central District in Farahan County, Markazi province, Iran.

== Demographics ==
=== Population ===
At the time of the 2006 National Census, the village's population was 538 in 184 households, when it was in the former Farahan District of Tafresh County. The following census in 2011 counted 544 people in 183 households, by which time the district had been separated from the county in the establishment of Farahan County. The rural district was transferred to the new Central District. The 2016 census measured the population of the village as 403 people in 156 households.
