= Feshk, Markazi =

Village in Markazi province, Iran

Feshk Persian: فشك
- Village
- Location within Iran
- Coordinates: 34°40′19″N 49°44′34″E
- Country: Iran
- Province: Markazi
- County: Farahan
- District: Central
- Rural District: Feshk

Population (2016)
  - Total: 1,140
- Time zone: UTC+3:30 (IRST)

Feshk (Persian: فشك) (Note: Also romanized as Fashk) is a village in, and the capital of, Feshk Rural District in the Central District of Farahan County, Markazi province, Iran.

== Demographics ==
=== Population ===
At the time of the 2006 National Census, the village's population was 1,231 in 409 households, when it was in the former Farahan District of Tafresh County. The following census in 2011 counted 990 people in 362 households, by which time the district had been separated from the county in the establishment of Farahan County. The rural district was transferred to the new Central District. The 2016 census measured the population of the village as 1,140 people in 444 households, the most populous in its rural district.
