= Zanjiran =

Village in Markazi province, Iran

Zanjiran Persian: زنجيران
- Village
- Location within Iran
- Coordinates: 34°40′03″N 49°28′42″E
- Country: Iran
- Province: Markazi
- County: Farahan
- District: Khenejin
- Rural District: Talkh Ab

Population (2016)
  - Total: 128
- Time zone: UTC+3:30 (IRST)

Zanjiran (Persian: زنجيران) (Note: Also romanized as Zanjīrān) is a village in Talkh Ab Rural District of Khenejin District in Farahan County, Markazi province, Iran.

== Demographics ==
=== Population ===
At the time of the 2006 National Census, the village's population was 162 in 47 households, when it was in Khenejin Rural District of the Central District in Komijan County. The following census in 2011 counted 130 people in 45 households, by which time the rural district had been separated from the county in the establishment of Farahan County. The rural district was transferred to the new Khenejin District, and Zanjiran was transferred to Talkh Ab Rural District created in the same district. The 2016 census measured the population of the village as 128 people in 42 households.
