= Chowgan, Farahan =

Village in Markazi province, Iran

Chowgan Persian: چوگان
- Village
- Location within Iran
- Coordinates: 34°50′36″N 49°31′52″E
- Country: Iran
- Province: Markazi
- County: Farahan
- District: Khenejin
- Rural District: Khenejin

Population (2016)
  - Total: 72
- Time zone: UTC+3:30 (IRST)

Chowgan (Persian: چوگان) (Note: Also romanized as Chowgān) is a village in Khenejin Rural District of Khenejin District in Farahan County, Markazi province, Iran.

== Demographics ==
=== Population ===
At the time of the 2006 National Census, the village's population was 114 in 27 households, when it was in the Central District of Komijan County. The following census in 2011 counted 59 people in 19 households, by which time the rural district had been separated from the county in the establishment of Farahan County. The rural district was transferred to the new Khenejin District. The 2016 census measured the population of the village as 72 people in 27 households.
