= Fardeqan =

Village in Markazi province, Iran

Fardeqan Persian: فردقان
- Village
- Location within Iran
- Coordinates: 34°49′52″N 49°36′01″E
- Country: Iran
- Province: Markazi
- County: Farahan
- District: Khenejin
- Rural District: Khenejin

Population (2016)
  - Total: 456
- Time zone: UTC+3:30 (IRST)

Fardeqan (Persian: فردقان) (Note: Also romanized as Fardaqān and Fardeqān; also known as Fardaghān and Phardogan) is a village in Khenejin Rural District of Khenejin District in Farahan County, Markazi province, Iran.

== Demographics ==
=== Population ===
At the time of the 2006 National Census, the village's population was 473 in 115 households, when it was in the Central District of Komijan County. The following census in 2011 counted 525 people in 143 households, by which time the rural district had been separated from the county in the establishment of Farahan County. The rural district was transferred to the new Khenejin District. The 2016 census measured the population of the village as 456 people in 133 households.
