= Paband =

Paband (Persian: پابند) may refer to:

- Paband, Hormozgan
- Paband-e Genow, Hormozgan Province
- Paband, Mazandaran
- Paband, Zanjan
