= Talkh Ab Rural District =

Rural district in Markazi province, Iran

Talkh Ab Rural District Persian: دهستان تلخ اب
- Rural District
- Location within Iran
- Coordinates: 34°41′N 49°35′E
- Country: Iran
- Province: Markazi
- County: Farahan
- District: Khenejin
- Established: 2011
- Capital: Talkh Ab

Population (2016)
  - Total: 6,684
- Time zone: UTC+3:30 (IRST)

Talkh Ab Rural District (Persian: دهستان تلخ اب) is in Khenejin District of Farahan County, Markazi province, Iran. It is administered from the city of Talkh Ab.

== History ==
In 2011, Khenejin Rural District was separated from Komijan County, and the former Farahan District was separated from Tafresh County, in the establishment of Farahan County. Talkh Ab Rural District was created in the new Khenejin District.

== Demographics ==
=== Population ===
At the time of the 2011 census, the rural district's population was 7,027 in 2,049 households. The 2016 census measured the population of the rural district as 6,684 in 2,134 households. The most populous of its 11 villages was Talkh Ab (now a city), with 3,442 people.

=== Other villages in the rural district ===
- Abbasabad
- Amirabad
- Arezumand
- Chaqqar
- Hafteh Khanak
- Shirinabad
- Vanak
- Zanjiran
- Ziaabad
