= Sojas Rud =

Sojas Rud (Persian: سجاس‌رود) may refer to:

- Sojas Rud District
- Sojas Rud Rural District
