= Gazeran, Farahan =

Gazeran گازران
- Village
- Location within Iran
- Coordinates: 34°34′30″N 49°37′04″E
- Country: Iran
- Province: Markazi
- County: Farahan
- Bakhsh: Central
- Rural District: Farmahin

Population (2006)
  - Total: 209
- Time zone: UTC+3:30 (IRST)
  - Summer (DST): UTC+4:30 (IRDT)

Gazeran (Persian: گازران, also Romanized as Gāzerān; also known as Gazrah and Kāzerūn) is a village in Farmahin Rural District, in the Central District of Farahan County, Markazi Province, Iran. At the 2006 census, its population was 209, in 52 families.
