= Salimabad =

Salimabad (Persian: سليم اباد) may refer to:

== Places in Iran ==
- Salimabad, Gilan
- Salimabad, Markazi
- Salimabad, Chalus, Mazandaran Province
- Salimabad, Tonekabon, Mazandaran Province
- Salimabad, Razavi Khorasan
- Salimabad, Sarbisheh, in South Khorasan Province
- Salimabad, Yazd

== Places in India ==
- Salimabad, Purba Bardhaman, West Bengal

== Places in Bangladesh ==
- Salimabad Union

== See also ==
- Salmabad (disambiguation)
- Salemabad (disambiguation)
