= Mashhad-e Zolfabad =

Mashhad-e Zolfabad مشهدزلف اباد
- Village
- Location within Iran
- Coordinates: 34°30′44″N 49°38′29″E
- Country: Iran
- Province: Markazi
- County: Farahan
- Bakhsh: Central
- Rural District: Farmahin

Population (2006)
  - Total: 133
- Time zone: UTC+3:30 (IRST)
  - Summer (DST): UTC+4:30 (IRDT)

Mashhad-e Zolfabad (Persian: مشهدزلف اباد, also Romanized as Mashhad-e Zolfābād) is a village in Farmahin Rural District, in the Central District of Farahan County, Markazi Province, Iran. At the 2006 census, its population was 133, in 56 families.

== Archeological Sites ==
Near the village lies a major archeological mound known by the same name, which includes archeological material stretching from the Achaemenid Period to the fourteenth century. The site was excavated in 2008.
