= Majdabad =

Majdabad or Majd Abad (Persian: مجداباد), also rendered as Mujdabad, may refer to various places in Iran:

- Majdabad, Marvdasht, Fars Province
- Majdabad, Isfahan
- Majdabad-e Kohneh, Markazi Province
- Majdabad-e Now, Markazi Province
- Majdabad, Razavi Khorasan
- Majdabad Rural District, in Fars Province

== See also ==
- Majidabad (disambiguation)
