= Majdabad-e Now =

Majdabad-e Now مجدابادنو
- Village
- Location within Iran
- Coordinates: 34°28′31″N 49°43′22″E
- Country: Iran
- Province: Markazi
- County: Farahan
- Bakhsh: Central
- Rural District: Farmahin

Population (2006)
  - Total: 63
- Time zone: UTC+3:30 (IRST)
  - Summer (DST): UTC+4:30 (IRDT)

Majdabad-e Now (Persian: مجدابادنو, also Romanized as Majdābād-e Now; also known as Majābād, Mujdābād, and Mujdābād Nau) is a village in Farmahin Rural District, in the Central District of Farahan County, Markazi Province, Iran. At the 2006 census, its population was 63, in 25 families.
