= Varvan =

Varvan وروان
- Village
- Location within Iran
- Coordinates: 34°34′09″N 49°33′38″E
- Country: Iran
- Province: Markazi
- County: Farahan
- Bakhsh: Central
- Rural District: Farmahin

Population (2006)
  - Total: 121
- Time zone: UTC+3:30 (IRST)
  - Summer (DST): UTC+4:30 (IRDT)

Varvan (Persian: وروان, also Romanized as Varvān; also known as Barband) is a village in Farmahin Rural District, in the Central District of Farahan County, Markazi Province, Iran. At the 2006 census, its population was 121, in 34 families.
