= Fashak =

Fashak or Feshk or Fashk (Persian: فشك) may refer to:

- Feshk, Markazi
- Fashak, Qazvin
- Feshk Rural District, an administrative division of Farahan County in Markazi province
