= Rakin, Markazi =

Village in Markazi province, Iran

Rakin Persian: ركين
- Village
- Location within Iran
- Coordinates: 34°45′57″N 49°35′21″E
- Country: Iran
- Province: Markazi
- County: Farahan
- District: Khenejin
- Rural District: Khenejin

Population (2016)
  - Total: 260
- Time zone: UTC+3:30 (IRST)

Rakin (Persian: ركين) (Note: Also romanized as Rakīn and Rokīn; also known as Raikhin) is a village in Khenejin Rural District of Khenejin District in Farahan County, Markazi province, Iran.

== Demographics ==
=== Population ===
At the time of the 2006 National Census, the village's population was 449 in 104 households, when it was in the Central District of Komijan County. The following census in 2011 counted 343 people in 101 households, by which time the rural district had been separated from the county in the establishment of Farahan County. The rural district was transferred to the new Khenejin District. The 2016 census measured the population of the village as 260 people in 72 households.
