= Borzabad, Markazi =

Borzabad برزاباد
- Village
- Location within Iran
- Coordinates: 34°32′13″N 49°40′15″E
- Country: Iran
- Province: Markazi
- County: Farahan
- Bakhsh: Central
- Rural District: Farmahin

Population (2006)
  - Total: 185
- Time zone: UTC+3:30 (IRST)
  - Summer (DST): UTC+4:30 (IRDT)

Borzabad (Persian: برزاباد, also Romanized as Borzābād; also known as Burzābād) is a village in Farmahin Rural District, in the Central District of Farahan County, Markazi Province, Iran. The 2006 Iranian census found the population of the village was 185, made up of 71 families.
