= Kamarak =

Kamarak or Kamrak (Persian: كمرك) may refer to:

- Kamarak, Afghanistan
- Kamarak, Iran
