= Darvishan, Markazi =

Village in Markazi province, Iran

Darvishan Persian: درويشان
- Village
- Location within Iran
- Coordinates: 34°45′57″N 49°28′16″E
- Country: Iran
- Province: Markazi
- County: Farahan
- District: Khenejin
- Rural District: Khenejin

Population (2016)
  - Total: 302
- Time zone: UTC+3:30 (IRST)

Darvishan (Persian: درويشان) (Note: Also romanized as Darvīshān; also known as Imām-i-Darvīshān) is a village in Khenejin Rural District of Khenejin District in Farahan County, Markazi province, Iran.

== Demographics ==
=== Population ===
At the time of the 2006 National Census, the village's population was 384 in 96 households, when it was in the Central District of Komijan County. The following census in 2011 counted 309 people in 90 households, by which time the rural district had been separated from the county in the establishment of Farahan County. The rural district was transferred to the new Khenejin District. The 2016 census measured the population of the village as 302 people in 93 households.
