= Kamarak, Iran =

Kamarak كمرك
- Village
- Location within Iran
- Coordinates: 34°35′13″N 49°35′12″E
- Country: Iran
- Province: Markazi
- County: Farahan
- Bakhsh: Central
- Rural District: Farmahin

Population (2006)
  - Total: 41
- Time zone: UTC+3:30 (IRST)
  - Summer (DST): UTC+4:30 (IRDT)

Kamarak (Persian: كمرك, also Romanized as Kamrak; also known as Kamareh) is a village in Farmahin Rural District, in the Central District of Farahan County, Markazi Province, Iran. At the 2006 census, its population was 41, in 12 families.
