= Sheykh Musa =

Sheykh Musa (Persian: شيخ موسي) may refer to:

- Sheykh Musa, Mazandaran
- Sheykh Musa, Zanjan
- Sheykh Musa Rural District, in Golestan Province
