= Gurchan, Markazi =

Village in Markazi province, Iran

Gurchan Persian: گورچان
- Village
- Location within Iran
- Coordinates: 34°48′24″N 49°29′12″E
- Country: Iran
- Province: Markazi
- County: Farahan
- District: Khenejin
- Rural District: Khenejin

Population (2016)
  - Total: 380
- Time zone: UTC+3:30 (IRST)

Gurchan (Persian: گورچان) (Note: Also romanized as Gūrchān; also known as Qūrchān) is a village in Khenejin Rural District of Khenejin District in Farahan County, Markazi province, Iran.

== Demographics ==
=== Language ===
The inhabitants speak Tati

=== Population ===
At the time of the 2006 National Census, the village's population was 466 in 115 households, when it was in the Central District of Komijan County. The following census in 2011 counted 392 people in 122 households, by which time the rural district had been separated from the county in the establishment of Farahan County. The rural district was transferred to the new Khenejin District. The 2016 census measured the population of the village as 380 people in 133 households.
