= Talkh Ab, Markazi =

City in Markazi province, Iran

Talkh Ab Persian: تلخ اب
- City
- Location within Iran
- Coordinates: 34°42′46″N 49°38′57″E
- Country: Iran
- Province: Markazi
- County: Farahan
- District: Khenejin
- Established as a city: 2018

Population (2016)
  - Total: 3,681
- Time zone: UTC+3:30 (IRST)

Talkh Ab (Persian: تلخ اب) (Note: Also romanized as Talkh Āb and Talkhāb) is a city in Khenejin District of Farahan County, Markazi province, Iran, serving as the administrative center for Talkh Ab Rural District.

== Demographics ==
=== Population ===
At the time of the 2006 National Census, Talkh Ab's population was 3,100 in 8,281 households, when it was a village in Feshk Rural District of the former Farahan District in Tafresh County. The following census in 2011 counted 3,569 people in 1,038 households, by which time the district had been separated from the county in the establishment of Farahan County. The rural district was transferred to the new Central District, and Talkh Ab was transferred to Talkh Ab Rural District created in the new Khenejin District. The 2016 census measured the population of the village as 3,681 people in 1,162 households, the most populous in its rural district.

The village of Talkh Ab was converted to a city in 2018.
