= Yengejeh, Khodabandeh =

Village in Zanjan province, Iran

Yengejeh Persian: ينگجه
- Village
- Location within Iran
- Coordinates: 36°20′42″N 48°38′37″E
- Country: Iran
- Province: Zanjan
- County: Khodabandeh
- District: Sojas Rud
- Rural District: Sojas Rud

Population (2016)
  - Total: 691
- Time zone: UTC+3:30 (IRST)

Yengejeh (Persian: ينگجه) (Note: Also known as Bengajeh, Yangidzhekh, and Yangijeh) is a village in Sojas Rud Rural District of Sojas Rud District in Khodabandeh County, Zanjan province, Iran.

== Demographics ==
=== Population ===
At the time of the 2006 National Census, the village's population was 639 in 166 households. The following census in 2011 counted 745 people in 224 households. The 2016 census measured the population of the village as 691 people in 209 households.
