= Mouza =

Type of administrative district in Bangladesh, Pakistan and India

In Bangladesh, Pakistan and parts of India, a mouza or mauza (also mouja) is a type of administrative district, corresponding to a specific land area within which there may be one or more settlements. Before the 20th century, the term referred to a revenue collection unit just underneath a pargana or revenue district.

The mauza system in the Indian Subcontinent is similar to the manorial system in Europe. The head of a mauza is styled as Mustajir, Pradhan or Mulraiyat, equivalent to Lord of the Manor in the manorial system.

As populations increased and villages became more common and developed, the concept of the mouza declined in importance. Today it has become mostly synonymous with the gram or village. Most voter lists, for example, now use the names of villages rather than mouzas.

In contemporary Pakistan, a mouza is defined as "a territorial unit with a separate name, definite boundaries, and area precisely measured and divided into plots/khasras/survey numbers." Each mouza has a cadastral map maintained in the land revenue record and, except in Sindh, each one has a Hadabast Number. A mouza may be either a compact or a scattered unit, and there may be one or more settlements (a.k.a. abadis, bastis, dhoks, goths, tola, turf, hundi etc.) in the mouza's territory. A mouza may also be unpopulated.

In Sindh, a mouza is known as a deh.

== See also ==
- Mauja
