= Qameshlu, Sojas Rud =

Village in Zanjan province, Iran

Qameshlu Persian: قمشلو
- Village
- Location within Iran
- Coordinates: 36°09′06″N 48°18′49″E
- Country: Iran
- Province: Zanjan
- County: Khodabandeh
- District: Sojas Rud
- Rural District: Aq Bolagh

Population (2016)
  - Total: 68
- Time zone: UTC+3:30 (IRST)

Qameshlu (Persian: قمشلو) (Note: Also romanized as Qameshlū; also known as Gomeshlū, Gowmeshlū, Kūkūshlu, Kūshgūnlū, Kushkunu, Kūshlū, and Qīmishlu) is a village in Aq Bolagh Rural District of Sojas Rud District in Khodabandeh County, Zanjan province, Iran.

== Demographics ==
=== Population ===
At the time of the 2006 National Census, the village's population was 77 in 12 households. The following census in 2011 counted 55 people in 15 households. The 2016 census measured the population of the village as 68 people in 20 households.
