= Nahravan =

Nahravan (Persian: نهروان) may refer to:

- Nahrawan Canal, an ancient Persian irrigation system in modern-day Iraq
- Nahravan, Iran, a village in Zanjan Province, Iran
