= Khandab, Zanjan =

Village in Zanjan province, Iran

Khandab Persian: خنداب
- Village
- Location in Iran
- Coordinates: 36°15′52″N 48°29′35″E
- Country: Iran
- Province: Zanjan
- County: Khodabandeh
- District: Sojas Rud
- Rural District: Sojas Rud

Population (2016)
  - Total: 1,646
- Time zone: UTC+3:30 (IRST)

Khandab (Persian: خنداب) (Note: Also romanized as Khandāb and Khondāb; also known as Khundab) is a village in Sojas Rud Rural District of Sojas Rud District in Khodabandeh County, Zanjan province, Iran.

== Demographics ==
=== Population ===
At the time of the 2006 National Census, the village's population was 1,562 in 376 households. The following census in 2011 counted 1,721 people in 490 households. The 2016 census measured the population of the village as 1,646 people in 490 households.
