= Malek Baghi, Markazi =

Village in Markazi province, Iran

Malek Baghi Persian: ملك باغي
- Village
- Location within Iran
- Coordinates: 34°47′09″N 49°36′40″E
- Country: Iran
- Province: Markazi
- County: Farahan
- District: Khenejin
- Rural District: Khenejin

Population (2016)
  - Total: 33
- Time zone: UTC+3:30 (IRST)

Malek Baghi (Persian: ملك باغي) (Note: Also romanized as Malek Bāghī; also known as Malik Poweh) is a village in Khenejin Rural District of Khenejin District in Farahan County, Markazi province, Iran.

== Demographics ==
=== Population ===
At the time of the 2006 National Census, the village's population was 31 in eight households, when it was in the Central District of Komijan County. The following census in 2011 counted 18 people in six households, by which time the rural district had been separated from the county in the establishment of Farahan County. The rural district was transferred to the new Khenejin District. The 2016 census measured the population of the village as 33 people in 11 households.
