= Barik Ab, Khodabandeh =

Village in Zanjan province, Iran

Barik Ab Persian: باريك اب
- Village
- Location within Iran
- Coordinates: 36°12′42″N 48°24′23″E
- Country: Iran
- Province: Zanjan
- County: Khodabandeh
- District: Sojas Rud
- Rural District: Aq Bolagh

Population (2016)
  - Total: 86
- Time zone: UTC+3:30 (IRST)

Barik Ab (Persian: باريك اب) (Note: Also romanized as Bārīk Āb; also known as Barkab) is a village in Aq Bolagh Rural District of Sojas Rud District in Khodabandeh County, Zanjan province, Iran.

== Demographics ==
=== Population ===
At the time of the 2006 National Census, the village's population was 190 in 40 households. The following census in 2011 counted 133 people in 38 households. The 2016 census measured the population of the village as 86 people in 29 households.
