= Mohammadabad, Sojas Rud =

Village in Zanjan province, Iran

Mohammadabad Persian: محمداباد
- Village
- Location within Iran
- Coordinates: 36°21′11″N 48°36′43″E
- Country: Iran
- Province: Zanjan
- County: Khodabandeh
- District: Sojas Rud
- Rural District: Sojas Rud

Population (2016)
  - Total: 453
- Time zone: UTC+3:30 (IRST)

Mohammadabad (Persian: محمداباد) (Note: Also romanized as Moḩammadābād; also known as Muhammadābād and Mukhammabad) is a village in Sojas Rud Rural District of Sojas Rud District in Khodabandeh County, Zanjan province, Iran.

== Demographics ==
=== Population ===
At the time of the 2006 National Census, the village's population was 475 in 92 households. The following census in 2011 counted 453 people in 125 households. The 2016 census measured the population of the village as 453 people in 128 households.
