= Mehdiabad, Zanjan =

Village in Zanjan province, Iran

Mehdiabad Persian: مهدي اباد
- Village
- Location within Iran
- Coordinates: 36°10′46″N 48°27′19″E
- Country: Iran
- Province: Zanjan
- County: Khodabandeh
- District: Sojas Rud
- Rural District: Aq Bolagh

Population (2016)
  - Total: 386
- Time zone: UTC+3:30 (IRST)

Mehdiabad (Persian: مهدي اباد) (Note: Also romanized as Mehdīābād) is a village in Aq Bolagh Rural District of Sojas Rud District in Khodabandeh County, Zanjan province, Iran.

== Demographics ==
=== Population ===
At the time of the 2006 National Census, the village's population was 414 in 79 households. The following census in 2011 counted 423 people in 99 households. The 2016 census measured the population of the village as 386 people in 106 households.
