= Kashkabad =

Kashkabad or Koshkabad (Persian: كشك اباد) may refer to:

- Kashkabad, North Khorasan
- Koshkabad, Zanjan

== See also ==
- Kushkabad (disambiguation)
