= Mehrinabad =

Village in Zanjan province, Iran

Mehrinabad Persian: مهرين اباد
- Village
- Location within Iran
- Coordinates: 36°08′48″N 48°25′25″E
- Country: Iran
- Province: Zanjan
- County: Khodabandeh
- District: Sojas Rud
- Rural District: Aq Bolagh

Population (2016)
  - Total: 95
- Time zone: UTC+3:30 (IRST)

Mehrinabad (Persian: مهرين اباد) (Note: Also romanized as Mehrīnābād; also known as Mehrānābād) is a village in Aq Bolagh Rural District of Sojas Rud District in Khodabandeh County, Zanjan province, Iran.

== Demographics ==
=== Population ===
At the time of the 2006 National Census, the village's population was 160 in 36 households. The following census in 2011 counted 154 people in 35 households. The 2016 census measured the population of the village as 95 people in 25 households.
