= Gazeran, Iran =

Gazeran or Gazoran or Gazran (Persian: گازران) may refer to:

- Gazeran, Farahan
- Gazeran, Khondab
