= Borzabad =

Borzabad or Barzabad (Persian: برزاباد) may refer to:

- Borzabad, Kashan, a village in Isfahan province
- Borzabad, Kuhpayeh, a village in Isfahan province
- Borzabad, Markazi
- Borzabad, North Khorasan
