= Kasr-e Asef =

Village in Markazi province, Iran

Kasr-e Asef Persian: كسراصف
- Village
- Location within Iran
- Coordinates: 34°50′27″N 49°33′16″E
- Country: Iran
- Province: Markazi
- County: Farahan
- District: Khenejin
- Rural District: Khenejin

Population (2016)
  - Total: 339
- Time zone: UTC+3:30 (IRST)

Kasr-e Asef (Persian: كسراصف) (Note: Also romanized as Kaşr Āşef, Kasr-e Āşef, and Kaşr-e Āşef; also known as Kasrāset and Khāsrās) is a village in Khenejin Rural District of Khenejin District in Farahan County, Markazi province, Iran.

== Demographics ==
=== Population ===
At the time of the 2006 National Census, the village's population was 465 in 101 households, when it was in the Central District of Komijan County. The following census in 2011 counted 421 people in 113 households, by which time the rural district had been separated from the county in the establishment of Farahan County. The rural district was transferred to the new Khenejin District. The 2016 census measured the population of the village as 339 people in 107 households.
