= Kushkabad =

Kushkabad (Persian: كوشك اباد or كوشكاباد) may refer to:

- Kushkabad, Hamadan
- Kushkabad, Razavi Khorasan
- Kushkabad, alternate name of Kushk, South Khorasan
- Kushkabad, Zanjan

== See also ==
- Kashkabad (disambiguation)
