= Changuri =

Village in Zanjan province, Iran

Changuri Persian: چنگوري
- Village
- Location within Iran
- Coordinates: 36°23′23″N 48°35′41″E
- Country: Iran
- Province: Zanjan
- County: Khodabandeh
- District: Sojas Rud
- Rural District: Sojas Rud

Population (2016)
  - Total: 785
- Time zone: UTC+3:30 (IRST)

Changuri (Persian: چنگوري) (Note: Also romanized as Changūrī; also known as Chinguru) is a village in Sojas Rud Rural District of Sojas Rud District in Khodabandeh County, Zanjan province, Iran.

== Demographics ==
=== Population ===
At the time of the 2006 National Census, the village's population was 851 in 174 households. The following census in 2011 counted 822 people in 239 households. The 2016 census measured the population of the village as 785 people in 197 households.
