= Qarah Gol, Khodabandeh =

Village in Zanjan province, Iran

Qarah Gol Persian: قره گل
- Village
- Location within Iran
- Coordinates: 36°10′13″N 48°24′48″E
- Country: Iran
- Province: Zanjan
- County: Khodabandeh
- District: Sojas Rud
- Rural District: Aq Bolagh

Population (2016)
  - Total: 172
- Time zone: UTC+3:30 (IRST)

Qarah Gol (Persian: قره گل) (Note: Also romanized as Qareh Gol; also known as Karakul and Qara Kūl) is a village in Aq Bolagh Rural District of Sojas Rud District in Khodabandeh County, Zanjan province, Iran.

== Demographics ==
=== Population ===
At the time of the 2006 National Census, the village's population was 184 in 31 households. The following census in 2011 counted 166 people in 37 households. The 2016 census measured the population of the village as 172 people in 49 households.
