= Zarand, Zanjan =

Village in Zanjan province, Iran

Zarand Persian: زرند
- Village
- Location within Iran
- Coordinates: 36°09′49″N 48°31′09″E
- Country: Iran
- Province: Zanjan
- County: Khodabandeh
- District: Sojas Rud
- Rural District: Aq Bolagh

Population (2016)
  - Total: 949
- Time zone: UTC+3:30 (IRST)

Zarand (Persian: زرند) is a village in Aq Bolagh Rural District of Sojas Rud District in Khodabandeh County, Zanjan province, Iran.

== Demographics ==
=== Population ===
At the time of the 2006 National Census, the village's population was 901 in 208 households. The following census in 2011 counted 949 people in 251 households. The 2016 census measured the population of the village as 949 people in 261 households.
