= Valazjerd =

Valazjerd or Velazjerd or Walazird (Persian: ولازجرد) may refer to:

- Valazjerd, Markazi
- Valazjerd, Farahan, Markazi Province
- Valazjerd, Qazvin

== See also ==
- Velashjerd (disambiguation)
