= Dehjalal =

Village in Zanjan province, Iran

Dehjalal Persian: ده جلال
- Village
- Location within Iran
- Coordinates: 36°19′09″N 48°42′08″E
- Country: Iran
- Province: Zanjan
- County: Khodabandeh
- District: Sojas Rud
- Rural District: Sojas Rud

Population (2016)
  - Total: 439
- Time zone: UTC+3:30 (IRST)

Dehjalal (Persian: ده جلال) (Note: Also romanized as Dehjalāl; also known as Dekh-Dzhalal) is a village in Sojas Rud Rural District of Sojas Rud District in Khodabandeh County, Zanjan province, Iran.

== Demographics ==
=== Population ===
At the time of the 2006 National Census, the village's population was 505 in 115 households. The following census in 2011 counted 490 people in 136 households. The 2016 census measured the population of the village as 439 people in 128 households. Dehjalal is a village in the Sojas Rud Rural District of Khodabandeh County, located within the Zanjan Province of Iran.
