= Alencheh =

Village in Zanjan province, Iran

Alencheh Persian: النچه
- Village
- Location within Iran
- Coordinates: 36°14′25″N 48°23′36″E
- Country: Iran
- Province: Zanjan
- County: Khodabandeh
- District: Sojas Rud
- Rural District: Aq Bolagh

Population (2016)
  - Total: 288
- Time zone: UTC+3:30 (IRST)

Alencheh (Persian: النچه) (Note: Also known as Alenjeh, Alīnjeh, Alundzha, Alūnjeh, and Alunjeh) is a village in Aq Bolagh Rural District of Sojas Rud District in Khodabandeh County, Zanjan province, Iran.

== Demographics ==
=== Population ===
At the time of the 2006 National Census, the village's population was 371 in 72 households. The following census in 2011 counted 331 people in 85 households. The 2016 census measured the population of the village as 288 people in 83 households.
