= Owch Bolagh, Khodabandeh =

Village in Zanjan province, Iran

Owch Bolagh Persian: اوچ بلاغ
- Village
- Location within Iran
- Coordinates: 36°09′05″N 48°20′38″E
- Country: Iran
- Province: Zanjan
- County: Khodabandeh
- District: Sojas Rud
- Rural District: Aq Bolagh

Population (2016)
  - Total: 157
- Time zone: UTC+3:30 (IRST)

Owch Bolagh (Persian: اوچ بلاغ) (Note: Also romanized as Aūch Bulāq, Owch Bolāgh, and Ūch Bolāgh) is a village in Aq Bolagh Rural District of Sojas Rud District in Khodabandeh County, Zanjan province, Iran.

== Demographics ==
=== Population ===
At the time of the 2006 National Census, the village's population was 161 in 32 households. The following census in 2011 counted 147 people in 37 households. The 2016 census measured the population of the village as 157 people in 49 households.
