= Aqbolagh-e Sofla =

Village in Zanjan province, Iran

Aqbolagh-e Sofla Persian: اقبلاغ سفلي
- Village
- Location within Iran
- Coordinates: 36°09′47″N 48°22′21″E
- Country: Iran
- Province: Zanjan
- County: Khodabandeh
- District: Sojas Rud
- Rural District: Aq Bolagh

Population (2016)
  - Total: 597
- Time zone: UTC+3:30 (IRST)

Aqbolagh-e Sofla (Persian: اقبلاغ سفلي) (Note: Also romanized as Āqbolāgh-e Soflá; also known as Āq Bolāgh, Āq Bolāgh-e Pā’īn, and Aq Bulāq) is a village in, and the capital of, Aq Bolagh Rural District in Sojas Rud District of Khodabandeh County, Zanjan province, Iran.

== Demographics ==
=== Population ===
At the time of the 2006 National Census, the village's population was 723 in 144 households. The following census in 2011 counted 739 people in 164 households. The 2016 census measured the population of the village as 597 people in 162 households.
