= Aqa Jari, Zanjan =

Village in Zanjan province, Iran

Aqa Jari Persian: اقاجري
- Village
- Location within Iran
- Coordinates: 36°18′42″N 48°25′04″E
- Country: Iran
- Province: Zanjan
- County: Khodabandeh
- District: Sojas Rud
- Rural District: Sojas Rud

Population (2016)
  - Total: 444
- Time zone: UTC+3:30 (IRST)

Aqa Jari (Persian: اقاجري) (Note: Also romanized as Āqā Jarī; also known as Aga Jari and Agach Ayry) is a village in Sojas Rud Rural District of Sojas Rud District in Khodabandeh County, Zanjan province, Iran.

== Demographics ==
=== Population ===
At the time of the 2006 National Census, the village's population was 536 in 108 households. The following census in 2011 counted 496 people in 126 households. The 2016 census measured the population of the village as 444 people in 131 households.
