= Velashjerd =

Velashjerd or Valashjerd or Valashejerd (Persian: ولاشجرد) may refer to:

- Valashejerd, Razan, Hamadan Province
- Velashjerd, Tuyserkan, Hamadan Province
- Velashjerd, Markazi

== See also ==
- Valazjerd (disambiguation)
