= Kabutarak =

Village in Zanjan province, Iran

Kabutarak Persian: كبوترك
- Village
- Location within Iran
- Coordinates: 36°17′45″N 48°43′00″E
- Country: Iran
- Province: Zanjan
- County: Khodabandeh
- District: Sojas Rud
- Rural District: Sojas Rud

Population (2016)
  - Total: Below reporting threshold
- Time zone: UTC+3:30 (IRST)

Kabutarak (Persian: كبوترك) (Note: Also romanized as Kabūtarak) is a village in Sojas Rud Rural District of Sojas Rud District in Khodabandeh County, Zanjan province, Iran.

== Demographics ==
=== Population ===
At the time of the 2006 National Census, the village's population was 37 in nine households. The following censuses in 2011 and 2016 measured the population of the village as below the reporting threshold.
