= Muhammad Rashid =

Muhammad Rashid or Muhammad Rashid may refer to:

- Muhammad Rashid (long jumper) (born 1935), Pakistani Olympic athlete
- Muhammad Rashid (field hockey, born 1992), Pakistani field hockey player
- Muhammad Rashid (field hockey, born 1941)
- Mohammed Rashid (born 1995), Palestinian footballer
- Muhammed Rashid, Indian football midfielder
- Mohammad Rashed, Kuwaiti footballer
- Muhammad Rashid, leader of the Hama Rashid revolt
- Moḩammad Rashīd, another name for the Iranian village Talkhab-e Dishmuk

== See also ==
- Mohamed Rasheed (disambiguation)
- Mohamed Rashed Daoud Al-Owhali, British-born Saudi terrorist
- Muhammad Rashid Khan, Pakistani athlete
- Mohammad Rashid Khilji, Pakistani politician
- Mohammad Rashid Mazaheri, Iranian footballer
- Muhammad Rashid Pasha, Ottoman statesman
- Muhammad Rashid Rida, Syrian-Egyptian Islamic scholar and reformer
- Muhammad Rashid Shah, Pakistani politician
- Mohamed Rashid Srour, Emirati footballer
- Mohamed Rashad, Maldivian singer
- Mohammad Rashad Al Matini, former Egpytian minister of transportation
- Mohammed Rashad Abdulle, Ethiopian scholar
