= Nosratabad, Zanjan =

Village in Zanjan province, Iran

Nosratabad Persian: نصرت اباد
- Village
- Location within Iran
- Coordinates: 36°12′29″N 48°22′47″E
- Country: Iran
- Province: Zanjan
- County: Khodabandeh
- District: Sojas Rud
- Rural District: Aq Bolagh

Population (2016)
  - Total: 490
- Time zone: UTC+3:30 (IRST)

Nosratabad (Persian: نصرت اباد) (Note: Also romanized as Noşratābād) is a village in Aq Bolagh Rural District of Sojas Rud District in Khodabandeh County, Zanjan province, Iran.

== Demographics ==
=== Population ===
At the time of the 2006 National Census, the village's population was 607 in 112 households. The following census in 2011 counted 554 people in 139 households. The 2016 census measured the population of the village as 490 people in 145 households.
