= Guran, Zanjan =

Village in Zanjan province, Iran

Guran Persian: گوران
- Village
- Location within Iran
- Coordinates: 36°11′22″N 48°18′58″E
- Country: Iran
- Province: Zanjan
- County: Khodabandeh
- District: Sojas Rud
- Rural District: Aq Bolagh

Population (2016)
  - Total: 234
- Time zone: UTC+3:30 (IRST)

Guran (Persian: گوران) (Note: Also romanized as Gūrān) is a village in Aq Bolagh Rural District of Sojas Rud District in Khodabandeh County, Zanjan province, Iran.

== Demographics ==
=== Population ===
At the time of the 2006 National Census, the village's population was 375 in 68 households. The following census in 2011 counted 311 people in 77 households. The 2016 census measured the population of the village as 234 people in 67 households.
