= Velashjerd, Markazi =

Velashjerd ولاشجرد
- Village
- Location within Iran
- Coordinates: 34°24′08″N 49°43′47″E
- Country: Iran
- Province: Markazi
- County: Farahan
- Bakhsh: Central
- Rural District: Farmahin

Population (2006)
  - Total: 92
- Time zone: UTC+3:30 (IRST)
  - Summer (DST): UTC+4:30 (IRDT)

Velashjerd (Persian: ولاشجرد, also Romanized as Velāshjerd and Valāshjerd; also known as Bīlāskīrt, Valāsjerd, Valāzjerd, and Walashgird) is a village in Farmahin Rural District, in the Central District of Farahan County, Markazi Province, Iran. At the 2006 census, its population was 92, in 29 families.
