= Dabanlu, Zanjan =

Village in Zanjan province, Iran

Dabanlu Persian: دابانلو
- Village
- Location within Iran
- Coordinates: 36°23′51″N 48°33′59″E
- Country: Iran
- Province: Zanjan
- County: Khodabandeh
- District: Sojas Rud
- Rural District: Sojas Rud

Population (2016)
  - Total: 630
- Time zone: UTC+3:30 (IRST)

Dabanlu (Persian: دابانلو) (Note: Also romanized as Dābānlū; also known as Dapatlu and Oapatlu) is a village in Sojas Rud Rural District of Sojas Rud District in Khodabandeh County, Zanjan province, Iran.

== Demographics ==
=== Population ===
At the time of the 2006 National Census, the village's population was 666 in 157 households. The following census in 2011 counted 631 people in 182 households. The 2016 census measured the population of the village as 630 people in 202 households.
