= Zavinaq =

Village in Zanjan province, Iran

Zavinaq Persian: ذوينق
- Village
- Location within Iran
- Coordinates: 36°13′46″N 48°28′24″E
- Country: Iran
- Province: Zanjan
- County: Khodabandeh
- District: Sojas Rud
- Rural District: Sojas Rud

Population (2016)
  - Total: 433
- Time zone: UTC+3:30 (IRST)

Zavinaq (Persian: ذوينق) (Note: Also romanized as Z̄avīnaq; also known as Zavanaq, Zavanīq, Zavnīq, Zoonaq, Zūneh, and Zvina) is a village in Sojas Rud Rural District of Sojas Rud District in Khodabandeh County, Zanjan province, Iran.

== Demographics ==
=== Population ===
At the time of the 2006 National Census, the village's population was 442 in 92 households. The following census in 2011 counted 443 people in 119 households. The 2016 census measured the population of the village as 433 people in 128 households.
