= Khvosh =

Village in Zanjan province, Iran

Khvosh Persian: خوش
- Village
- Location within Iran
- Coordinates: 36°16′10″N 48°28′01″E
- Country: Iran
- Province: Zanjan
- County: Khodabandeh
- District: Sojas Rud
- Rural District: Sojas Rud

Population (2016)
  - Total: 830
- Time zone: UTC+3:30 (IRST)

Khvosh (Persian: خوش) (Note: Also romanized as Khowsh and Khush; also known as Khosh) is a village in Sojas Rud Rural District of Sojas Rud District in Khodabandeh County, Zanjan province, Iran.

== Demographics ==
=== Population ===
At the time of the 2006 National Census, the village's population was 799 in 171 households. The following census in 2011 counted 836 people in 213 households. The 2016 census measured the population of the village as 830 people in 244 households.
