= Shin, Iran =

Village in Zanjan province, Iran

Shin Persian: شين
- Village
- Location within Iran
- Coordinates: 36°12′10″N 48°24′54″E
- Country: Iran
- Province: Zanjan
- County: Khodabandeh
- District: Sojas Rud
- Rural District: Aq Bolagh

Population (2016)
  - Total: 79
- Time zone: UTC+3:30 (IRST)

Shin (Persian: شين) (Note: Also romanized as Shīn; also known as Sen) is a village in Aq Bolagh Rural District of Sojas Rud District in Khodabandeh County, Zanjan province, Iran.

== Demographics ==
=== Population ===
At the time of the 2006 National Census, the village's population was 84 in 20 households. The following census in 2011 counted 85 people in 24 households. The 2016 census measured the population of the village as 79 people in 24 households.
