= Siaman =

Village in Zanjan province, Iran

Siaman Persian: سيامان
- Village
- Location within Iran
- Coordinates: 36°12′53″N 48°33′57″E
- Country: Iran
- Province: Zanjan
- County: Khodabandeh
- District: Sojas Rud
- Rural District: Sojas Rud

Population (2016)
  - Total: 88
- Time zone: UTC+3:30 (IRST)

Siaman (Persian: سيامان) (Note: Also romanized as Seyāmān and Sīāmān; also known as Sīāhmān and Siakhman) is a village in Sojas Rud Rural District of Sojas Rud District in Khodabandeh County, Zanjan province, Iran.

== Demographics ==
=== Population ===
At the time of the 2006 National Census, the village's population was 190 in 44 households. The following census in 2011 counted 123 people in 35 households. The 2016 census measured the population of the village as 88 people in 34 households.
