= Chuzak =

Village in Zanjan province, Iran

Chuzak Persian: چوزك
- Village
- Location within Iran
- Coordinates: 36°18′06″N 48°26′01″E
- Country: Iran
- Province: Zanjan
- County: Khodabandeh
- District: Sojas Rud
- Rural District: Sojas Rud

Population (2016)
  - Total: 1,787
- Time zone: UTC+3:30 (IRST)

Chuzak (Persian: چوزك) (Note: Also romanized as Chūzak and Chūzok; also known as Chizuk, Chūzūk, Jūrak, and Jūrīk) is a village in, and the capital of, Sojas Rud Rural District in Sojas Rud District of Khodabandeh County, Zanjan province, Iran. The previous capital of the rural district was the village of Sojas, now a city.

== Demographics ==
=== Population ===
At the time of the 2006 National Census, the village's population was 1,558 in 363 households. The following census in 2011 counted 1,697 people in 493 households. The 2016 census measured the population of the village as 1,787 people in 549 households. It was the most populous village in its rural district.
