= Shur Ab, Khodabandeh =

Village in Zanjan province, Iran

Shur Ab Persian: شوراب
- Village
- Location within Iran
- Coordinates: 36°18′46″N 48°40′27″E
- Country: Iran
- Province: Zanjan
- County: Khodabandeh
- District: Sojas Rud
- Rural District: Sojas Rud

Population (2016)
  - Total: 296
- Time zone: UTC+3:30 (IRST)

Shur Ab (Persian: شوراب) (Note: Also romanized as Shūr Āb) is a village in Sojas Rud Rural District of Sojas Rud District in Khodabandeh County, Zanjan province, Iran.

== Demographics ==
=== Population ===
At the time of the 2006 National Census, the village's population was 301 in 68 households. The following census in 2011 counted 327 people in 95 households. The 2016 census measured the population of the village as 296 people in 88 households.
