= Emam Kandi, Khodabandeh =

Village in Zanjan province, Iran

Emam Kandi Persian: امام كندي
- Village
- Location within Iran
- Coordinates: 36°21′56″N 48°39′18″E
- Country: Iran
- Province: Zanjan
- County: Khodabandeh
- District: Sojas Rud
- Rural District: Sojas Rud

Population (2016)
  - Total: 222
- Time zone: UTC+3:30 (IRST)

Emam Kandi (Persian: امام كندي) (Note: Also romanized as Emām Kandī) is a village in Sojas Rud Rural District of Sojas Rud District in Khodabandeh County, Zanjan province, Iran.

== Demographics ==
=== Population ===
At the time of the 2006 National Census, the village's population was 318 in 72 households. The following census in 2011 counted 268 people in 68 households. The 2016 census measured the population of the village as 222 people in 60 households.
