= Mazidabad, Zanjan =

Village in Zanjan province, Iran

Mazidabad Persian: مزيداباد
- Village
- Location within Iran
- Coordinates: 36°12′17″N 48°36′15″E
- Country: Iran
- Province: Zanjan
- County: Khodabandeh
- District: Sojas Rud
- Rural District: Sojas Rud

Population (2016)
  - Total: 934
- Time zone: UTC+3:30 (IRST)

Mazidabad (Persian: مزيداباد) (Note: Also romanized as Mazīdābād; also known as Marzīdābād, Maziawa, and Mazlava) is a village in Sojas Rud Rural District of Sojas Rud District in Khodabandeh County, Zanjan province, Iran.

== Demographics ==
=== Population ===
At the time of the 2006 National Census, the village's population was 960 in 203 households. The following census in 2011 counted 1,035 people in 275 households. The 2016 census measured the population of the village as 934 people in 266 households.
