= Bulamaji, Khodabandeh =

Village in Zanjan province, Iran

Bulamaji Persian: بولاماجي
- Village
- Location within Iran
- Coordinates: 36°21′03″N 48°35′14″E
- Country: Iran
- Province: Zanjan
- County: Khodabandeh
- District: Sojas Rud
- Rural District: Sojas Rud

Population (2016)
  - Total: 781
- Time zone: UTC+3:30 (IRST)

Bulamaji (Persian: بولاماجي) (Note: Also romanized as Boolamaji, Būlāmājī, and Bulamāji; also known as Balā Māchī, Bolāmājī, and Bula-Madzhid) is a village in Sojas Rud Rural District of Sojas Rud District in Khodabandeh County, Zanjan province, Iran.

== Demographics ==
=== Population ===
At the time of the 2006 National Census, the village's population was 755 in 197 households. The following census in 2011 counted 868 people in 238 households. The 2016 census measured the population of the village as 781 people in 240 households.
