= Nahavis =

Village in Zanjan province, Iran

Nahavis Persian: نهاويس
- Village
- Location within Iran
- Coordinates: 36°15′24″N 48°27′27″E
- Country: Iran
- Province: Zanjan
- County: Khodabandeh
- District: Sojas Rud
- Rural District: Sojas Rud

Population (2016)
  - Total: 281
- Time zone: UTC+3:30 (IRST)

Nahavis (Persian: نهاويس) (Note: Also romanized as Nahāvīs and Nahawis; also known as Nabawais and Nakhavais) is a village in Sojas Rud Rural District of Sojas Rud District in Khodabandeh County, Zanjan province, Iran.

== Demographics ==
=== Population ===
At the time of the 2006 National Census, the village's population was 390 in 103 households. The following census in 2011 counted 336 people in 97 households. The 2016 census measured the population of the village as 281 people in 95 households.
