= Cheragh Mazraeh =

Village in Zanjan province, Iran

Cheragh Mazraeh Persian: چراغ مزرعه
- Village
- Location within Iran
- Coordinates: 36°11′54″N 48°20′23″E
- Country: Iran
- Province: Zanjan
- County: Khodabandeh
- District: Sojas Rud
- Rural District: Aq Bolagh

Population (2016)
  - Total: 74
- Time zone: UTC+3:30 (IRST)

Cheragh Mazraeh (Persian: چراغ مزرعه) (Note: Also romanized as Cherāgh Mazra‘eh; also known as Chirāgh Mazreh) is a village in Aq Bolagh Rural District of Sojas Rud District in Khodabandeh County, Zanjan province, Iran.

== Demographics ==
=== Population ===
At the time of the 2006 National Census, the village's population was 109 in 23 households. The following census in 2011 counted 96 people in 25 households. The 2016 census measured the population of the village as 74 people in 22 households.
