= Khomarak =

Village in Zanjan province, Iran

Khomarak Persian: خمارك
- Village
- Location within Iran
- Coordinates: 36°16′52″N 48°40′56″E
- Country: Iran
- Province: Zanjan
- County: Khodabandeh
- District: Sojas Rud
- Rural District: Sojas Rud

Population (2016)
  - Total: 366
- Time zone: UTC+3:30 (IRST)

Khomarak (Persian: خمارك) (Note: Also romanized as Khomārak; also known as Khovārak, Khuārak, and Khumarak) is a village in Sojas Rud Rural District of Sojas Rud District in Khodabandeh County, Zanjan province, Iran.

== Demographics ==
=== Population ===
At the time of the 2006 National Census, the village's population was 340 in 76 households. The following census in 2011 counted 358 people in 94 households. The 2016 census measured the population of the village as 366 people in 99 households.
