= Arqin =

Village in Zanjan province, Iran

Arqin Persian: ارقين
- Village
- Location within Iran
- Coordinates: 36°10′05″N 48°32′40″E
- Country: Iran
- Province: Zanjan
- County: Khodabandeh
- District: Sojas Rud
- Rural District: Aq Bolagh

Population (2016)
  - Total: 1,110
- Time zone: UTC+3:30 (IRST)

Arqin (Persian: ارقين) (Note: Also romanized as Arqīn; also known as Arghīn and Arkin) is a village in Aq Bolagh Rural District of Sojas Rud District in Khodabandeh County, Zanjan province, Iran.

== Demographics ==
=== Population ===
At the time of the 2006 National Census, the village's population was 936 in 209 households. The following census in 2011 counted 1,088 people in 308 households. The 2016 census measured the population of the village as 1,110 people in 332 households. It was the most populous village in its rural district.
