= Esperin =

Village in Zanjan province, Iran

Esperin Persian: اسپرين
- Village
- Location within Iran
- Coordinates: 36°17′18″N 48°23′24″E
- Country: Iran
- Province: Zanjan
- County: Khodabandeh
- District: Sojas Rud
- Rural District: Sojas Rud

Population (2016)
  - Total: 171
- Time zone: UTC+3:30 (IRST)

Esperin (Persian: اسپرين) (Note: Also romanized as Asperin, Esperīn, and Esprīn; also known as Esfrīn, Isbarin, and Isbirin) is a village in Sojas Rud Rural District of Sojas Rud District in Khodabandeh County, Zanjan province, Iran.

== Demographics ==
=== Population ===
At the time of the 2006 National Census, the village's population was 258 in 52 households. The following census in 2011 counted 226 people in 61 households. The 2016 census measured the population of the village as 171 people in 54 households.
