= Zarzar =

Village in Zanjan province, Iran

Zarzar Persian: زرزر
- Village
- Location within Iran
- Coordinates: 36°17′18″N 48°26′35″E
- Country: Iran
- Province: Zanjan
- County: Khodabandeh
- District: Sojas Rud
- Rural District: Sojas Rud

Population (2016)
  - Total: 578
- Time zone: UTC+3:30 (IRST)

Zarzar (Persian: زرزر) (Note: Also known as Raz Zarzar) is a village in Sojas Rud Rural District of Sojas Rud District in Khodabandeh County, Zanjan province, Iran.

== Demographics ==
=== Population ===
At the time of the 2006 National Census, the village's population was 608 in 116 households. The following census in 2011 counted 599 people in 152 households. The 2016 census measured the population of the village as 578 people in 176 households.
