= Chalakhvor =

Village in Zanjan province, Iran

Chalakhvor Persian: چیلاخور
- Village
- Location within Iran
- Coordinates: 36°22′58″N 48°34′30″E
- Country: Iran
- Province: Zanjan
- County: Khodabandeh
- District: Sojas Rud
- Rural District: Sojas Rud

Population (2016)
  - Total: 262
- Time zone: UTC+3:30 (IRST)

Chalakhvor (Persian: چلاخور) (Note: Also romanized as Chalakhur and Chalākhvor; also known as Chīlākhowr, Chīlākhvor, and Galakhur) is a village in Sojas Rud Rural District of Sojas Rud District in Khodabandeh County, Zanjan province, Iran.

== Demographics ==
=== Population ===
At the time of the 2006 National Census, the village's population was 288 in 66 households. The following census in 2011 counted 251 people in 65 households. The 2016 census measured the population of the village as 262 people in 71 households.
