= Malek Baghi =

Malek Baghi (Persian: ملك باغي) may refer to:

- Malek Baghi, Markazi, Iran
- Malek Baghi, Zanjan, Iran
