= Sarin Darreh =

Sarin Darreh (Persian: سرين دره) may refer to:

- Sarin Darreh, Khodabandeh
- Sarin Darreh, Mahneshan
