= Barband =

Barband (Persian: باربند) may refer to:

- Barband, Hamadan
- Barband, Markazi
