= Cheragh Hesari =

Village in Zanjan province, Iran

Cheragh Hesari Persian: چراغ حصاري
- Village
- Location within Iran
- Coordinates: 36°11′08″N 48°25′38″E
- Country: Iran
- Province: Zanjan
- County: Khodabandeh
- District: Sojas Rud
- Rural District: Aq Bolagh

Population (2016)
  - Total: 106
- Time zone: UTC+3:30 (IRST)

Cheragh Hesari (Persian: چراغ حصاري) (Note: Also romanized as Cherāgh Ḩeşārī; also known as Chirag-Khissari and Chirāgh Hisari) is a village in Aq Bolagh Rural District of Sojas Rud District in Khodabandeh County, Zanjan province, Iran.

== Demographics ==
=== Population ===
At the time of the 2006 National Census, the village's population was 142 in 38 households. The following census in 2011 counted 93 people in 30 households. The 2016 census measured the population of the village as 106 people in 32 households.
