= Tulum (disambiguation) =

Tulum is an archaeological site of the Maya civilization in Mexico. It may also refer to:

- Tulum (municipality), a municipality in the Mexican state Quintana Roo, named after the archaeological site
  - Tulum, Quintana Roo, a community in the Tulum Municipality, Quintana Roo, Mexico, near the archaeological site
  - Tulum railway station
- Tulum (bagpipe), a traditional musical instrument from Eastern Anatolia and the Caucasus regions
- "Tulum" (song), a song by Peso Pluma from the album Génesis
- Tulum Valley, a wine making region located within San Juan Province, Argentina
- Tulum cheese, a goat's milk cheese from Turkey

People

- Kurban Tulum (1883–1975), Uyghur treated by the Chinese Communist Party as a symbol of unity with the Uyghurs
- Zoran Tulum (b. 1956), a fencer and fencing coach from Yugoslavia

== See also ==
- Tulun (disambiguation)
