= Changur =

Village in Zanjan province, Iran

Changur Persian: چنگور
- Village
- Location within Iran
- Coordinates: 36°13′49″N 48°30′13″E
- Country: Iran
- Province: Zanjan
- County: Khodabandeh
- District: Sojas Rud
- Rural District: Sojas Rud

Population (2016)
  - Total: 489
- Time zone: UTC+3:30 (IRST)

Changur (Persian: چنگور) (Note: Also romanized as Changūr; also known as Chanqūr and Jankūr) is a village in Sojas Rud Rural District of Sojas Rud District in Khodabandeh County, Zanjan province, Iran.

== Demographics ==
=== Population ===
At the time of the 2006 National Census, the village's population was 468 in 102 households. The following census in 2011 counted 476 people in 144 households. The 2016 census measured the population of the village as 489 people in 160 households.
