= Eslamabad, Khodabandeh =

Village in Zanjan province, Iran

Eslamabad Persian: اسلام آباد
- Village
- Location within Iran
- Coordinates: 36°12′11″N 48°30′18″E
- Country: Iran
- Province: Zanjan
- County: Khodabandeh
- District: Sojas Rud
- Rural District: Sojas Rud

Population (2016)
  - Total: 150
- Time zone: UTC+3:30 (IRST)

Eslamabad (Persian: اسلام آباد) (Note: Also romanized as Eslāmābād) is a village in Sojas Rud Rural District of Sojas Rud District in Khodabandeh County, Zanjan province, Iran.

== Demographics ==
=== Population ===
At the time of the 2006 National Census, the village's population was 156 in 38 households. The following census in 2011 counted 143 people in 41 households. The 2016 census measured the population of the village as 150 people in 51 households.
