= Salimabad, Markazi =

Village in Markazi province, Iran

Salimabad Persian: سليم آباد
- Village
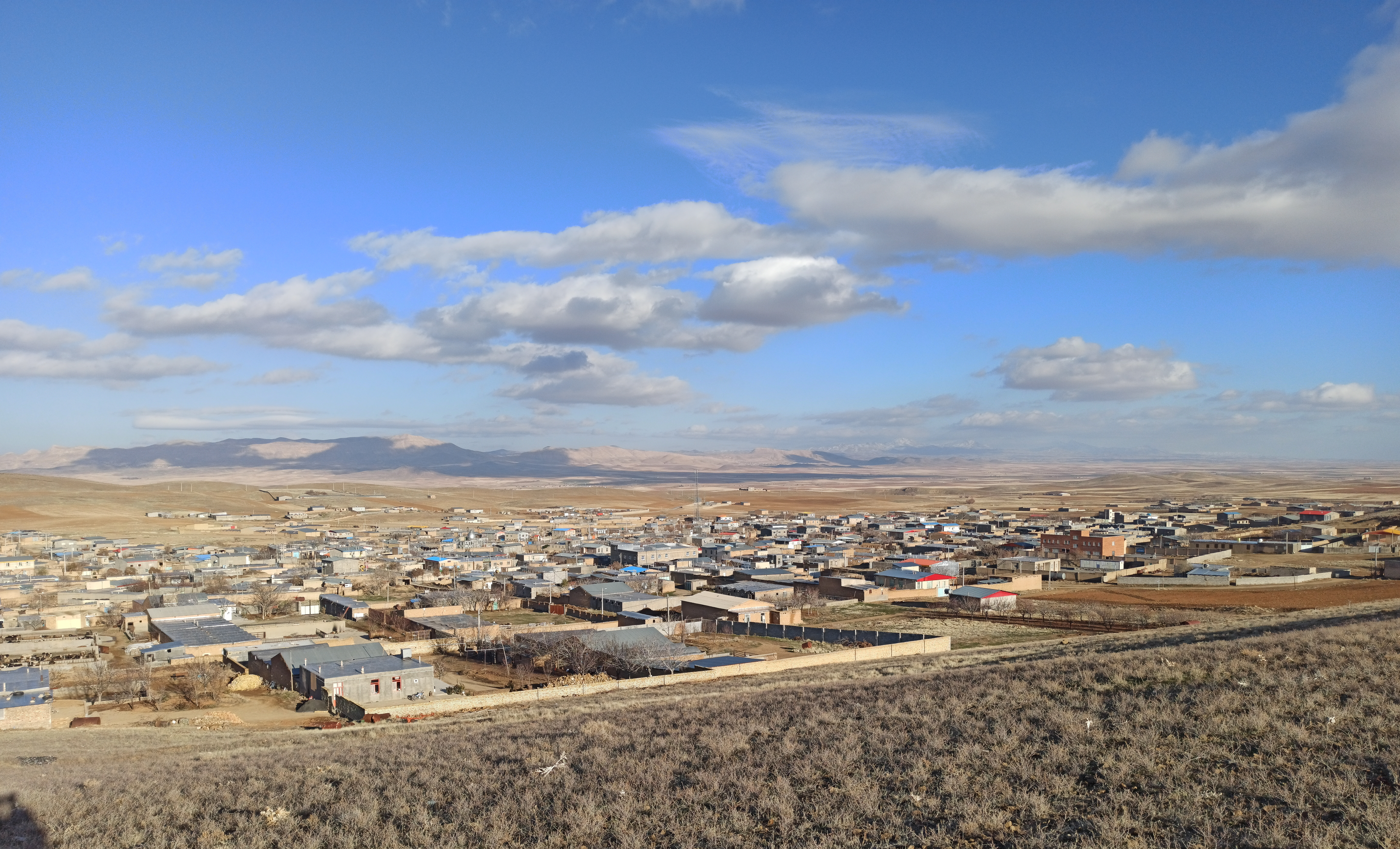
- The village of Salimabad

- Location within Iran
- Coordinates: 34°42′08″N 49°29′56″E
- Country: Iran
- Province: Markazi
- County: Farahan
- District: Khenejin
- Rural District: Khenejin

Population (2016)
  - Total: 991
- Time zone: UTC+3:30 (IRST)

Salimabad (Persian: سليماباد) (Note: Also romanized as Salīmābād; also known as Salmābād) is a village in Khenejin Rural District of Khenejin District in Farahan County, Markazi province, Iran.

== Demographics ==
=== Population ===
At the time of the 2006 National Census, the village's population was 1,020 in 264 households, when it was in the Central District of Komijan County. The following census in 2011 counted 1,081 people in 326 households, by which time the rural district had been separated from the county in the establishment of Farahan County. The rural district was transferred to the new Khenejin District. The 2016 census measured the population of the village as 991 people in 304 households, the most populous in its rural district.
