= Sojas =

City in Zanjan province, Iran

Sojas Persian: سجاس
- City
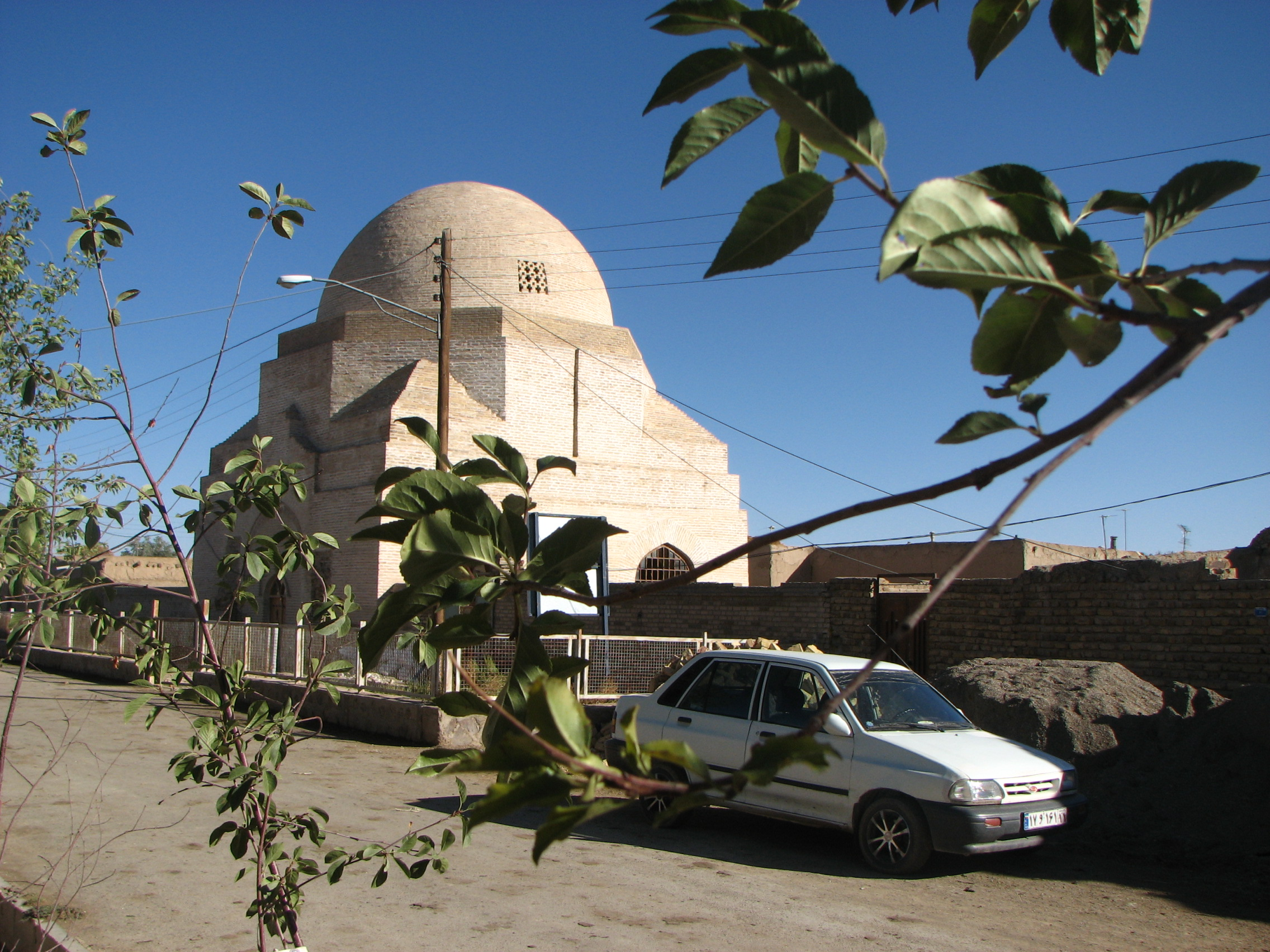
- Sojas Mosque

- Location within Iran
- Coordinates: 36°14′20″N 48°33′17″E
- Country: Iran
- Province: Zanjan
- County: Khodabandeh
- District: Sojas Rud
- Established: 1998
- Elevation: 1,762 m (5,781 ft)

Population (2016)
  - Total: 7,037
- Time zone: UTC+3:30 (IRST)

Sojas (Persian: سجاس) (Note: Also romanized as Sojās; also known as Sudzhas and Sujās) is a city in, and the capital of, Sojas Rud District in Khodabandeh County, Zanjan province, Iran. As a village, Sojas was the capital of Sojas Rud Rural District until its capital was transferred to the village of Chuzak. The village of Sojas was converted to a city in 1998.

== Demographics ==
=== Population ===
At the time of the 2006 National Census, the city's population was 5,577 in 1,345 households. The following census in 2011 counted 6,666 people in 1,725 households. The 2016 census measured the population of the city as 7,037 people in 2,038 households.
