= Sheykh Musa, Zanjan =

Village in Zanjan province, Iran

Sheykh Musa Persian: شيخ موسي
- Village
- Location within Iran
- Coordinates: 36°15′19″N 48°22′27″E
- Country: Iran
- Province: Zanjan
- County: Khodabandeh
- District: Sojas Rud
- Rural District: Aq Bolagh

Population (2016)
  - Total: 155
- Time zone: UTC+3:30 (IRST)

Sheykh Musa (Persian: شيخ موسي) (Note: Also romanized as Sheykh Mūsá; also known as Shaikh Museh) is a village in Aq Bolagh Rural District of Sojas Rud District in Khodabandeh County, Zanjan province, Iran.

== Demographics ==
=== Population ===
At the time of the 2006 National Census, the village's population was 317 in 65 households. The following census in 2011 counted 208 people in 54 households. The 2016 census measured the population of the village as 155 people in 44 households.
