= Nahrevan =

Village in Zanjan province, Iran

Nahrevan Persian: نهروان
- Village
- Location within Iran
- Coordinates: 36°11′44″N 48°31′45″E
- Country: Iran
- Province: Zanjan
- County: Khodabandeh
- District: Sojas Rud
- Rural District: Sojas Rud

Population (2016)
  - Total: 314
- Time zone: UTC+3:30 (IRST)

Nahrevan (Persian: نهروان) (Note: Also romanized as Nahravān, Nahrevān, and Nahrwān; also known as Nakhrvan and Nīrūbān) is a village in Sojas Rud Rural District of Sojas Rud District in Khodabandeh County, Zanjan province, Iran.

== Demographics ==
=== Population ===
At the time of the 2006 National Census, the village's population was 305 in 65 households. The following census in 2011 counted 305 people in 81 households. The 2016 census measured the population of the village as 314 people in 93 households.
