= Khenejin =

City in Markazi province, Iran

Khenejin Persian: خنجين
- City
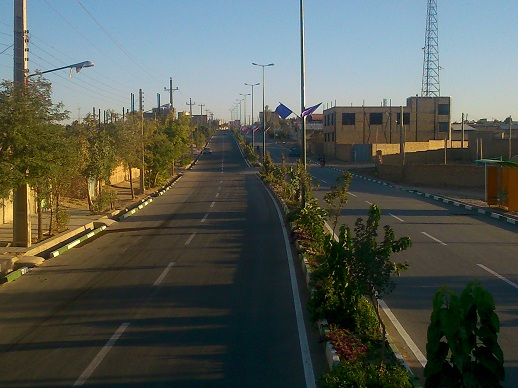
- Section of a highway in the city of Khenejin

- Location within Iran
- Coordinates: 34°45′20″N 49°31′52″E
- Country: Iran
- Province: Markazi
- County: Farahan
- District: Khenejin
- Established as a city: 2012

Population (2016)
  - Total: 3,235
- Time zone: UTC+3:30 (IRST)

Khenejin (Persian: خنجين) (Note: Also romanized as Khanājīn, Khānājin, Khanjīn, Khenejīn, Khenjīn, and Khon Jīn; also known as Farahan) is a city in, and the capital of, Khenejin District in Farahan County, Markazi province, Iran. It also serves as the administrative center for Khenejin Rural District.

== Demographics ==
=== Ethnicity ===
The city is populated by Persians (though labelled as Tats) and Khalaji Turks.

=== Population ===
At the time of the 2006 National Census, Khenejin's population was 2,909 in 741 households, when it was a village in Khenejin Rural District of the Central District in Komijan County. The following census in 2011 counted 2,745 people in 870 households, by which time the rural district had been separated from the county in the establishment of Farahan County. The rural district was transferred to the new Khenejin District. The 2016 census measured the population as 3,235 people in 1,041 households, when Khenejin had been converted to a city.
