= Tulun (disambiguation) =

Tulun may refer to:

- Tulun, town and administrative center of Tulunsky District, Irkutsk Oblast, Russia
- Tulun, Iran, a village in Ardabil Province, Iran
- Tulun, Zanjan, a village in Zanjan Province, Iran
- Tulun, Carteret Islands or Kilinailau, atoll in the South Pacific

== See also ==
- Ahmad ibn Tulun (835–884), founder of the Tulunid dynasty, which ruled Egypt briefly 868–905
- Mosque of Ibn Tulun, Cairo, Egypt, commissioned by Ahmad ibn Tulun
