= Salmabad, Iran =

Salmabad (Persian: سلم اباد) may refer to:

- Salmabad, Khondab, Markazi Province
- Salmabad, Komijan, Markazi Province
- Salmabad, Semnan
- Salmabad, Khusf, South Khorasan Province
- Salmabad, Sarbisheh, South Khorasan Province
