= Mohamed Rasheed =

Mohamed Rasheed may refer to:

- Mohamed Rasheed (actor) (born 1964), Maldivian film actor, cinematographer, producer and director
- Mohamed Rasheed (swimmer) (born 1968), Maldivian swimmer
- Mohamed Rasheed (footballer) (born 1985), Maldivian footballer
- Muhammad Rasheed (born 1956), Pakistani footballer

== See also ==
- Muhammad Rashid (disambiguation)
