= Aq Bolagh Rural District =

Rural district in Zanjan province, Iran

Aq Bolagh Rural District Persian: دهستان آق بلاغ
- Rural District
- Location within Iran
- Coordinates: 36°12′N 48°26′E
- Country: Iran
- Province: Zanjan
- County: Khodabandeh
- District: Sojas Rud
- Established: 1986
- Capital: Aqbolagh-e Sofla

Population (2016)
  - Total: 5,228
- Time zone: UTC+3:30 (IRST)

Aq Bolagh Rural District (Persian: دهستان آق بلاغ) is in Sojas Rud District of Khodabandeh County, Zanjan province, Iran. Its capital is the village of Aqbolagh-e Sofla.

== Demographics ==
=== Population ===
At the time of the 2006 National Census, the rural district's population was 5,996 in 1,226 households. There were 5,757 inhabitants in 1,461 households at the following census of 2011. The 2016 census measured the population of the rural district as 5,228 in 1,503 households. The most populous of its 19 villages was Arqin, with 1,110 people.

=== Other villages in the rural district ===
- Alencheh
- Barik Ab
- Cheragh Hesari
- Cheragh Mazraeh
- Guran
- Mehdiabad
- Mehrinabad
- Nosratabad
- Owch Bolagh
- Qameshlu
- Qarah Gol
- Sarin Darreh
- Sheykh Musa
- Shin
- Zarand
