= Mashhad-e Bazarjan =

Mashhad-e Bazarjan مشهدبارزجان
- Village
- Location within Iran
- Coordinates: 34°47′35″N 49°55′40″E
- Country: Iran
- Province: Markazi
- County: Tafresh
- Bakhsh: Central
- Rural District: Bazarjan

Population (2006)
  - Total: 50
- Time zone: UTC+3:30 (IRST)
  - Summer (DST): UTC+4:30 (IRDT)

Mashhad-e Bazarjan (Persian: مشهدبارزجان, also Romanized as Mashhad-e Bāzarjān and Mashhad-e Bāzerjān; also known as Mashad, Mashhad, and Mashhadī Bazarjan) is a village in Bazarjan Rural District, in the Central District of Tafresh County, Markazi Province, Iran. At the 2006 census, its population was 50, in 25 families.
