= Majidabad, Zanjan =

Village in Zanjan province, Iran

Majidabad Persian: مجيداباد
- Village
- Location within Iran
- Coordinates: 36°13′49″N 48°35′54″E
- Country: Iran
- Province: Zanjan
- County: Khodabandeh
- District: Sojas Rud
- Rural District: Sojas Rud

Population (2016)
  - Total: 654
- Time zone: UTC+3:30 (IRST)

Majidabad (Persian: مجيداباد) (Note: Also romanized as Majīdābād and Medzhidabad) is a village in Sojas Rud Rural District of Sojas Rud District in Khodabandeh County, Zanjan province, Iran.

== Demographics ==
=== Population ===
At the time of the 2006 National Census, the village's population was 806 in 171 households. The following census in 2011 counted 784 people in 227 households. The 2016 census measured the population of the village as 654 people in 210 households.
