= Duljin =

Village in Zanjan province, Iran

Duljin Persian: دولجين
- Village
- Location within Iran
- Coordinates: 36°16′32″N 48°25′10″E
- Country: Iran
- Province: Zanjan
- County: Khodabandeh
- District: Sojas Rud
- Rural District: Sojas Rud

Population (2016)
  - Total: 224
- Time zone: UTC+3:30 (IRST)

Duljin (Persian: دولجين) (Note: Also romanized as Dooljin, Dūlajīn, and Dūljīn; also known as Tūlūn) is a village in Sojas Rud Rural District of Sojas Rud District in Khodabandeh County, Zanjan province, Iran.

== Demographics ==
=== Population ===
At the time of the 2006 National Census, the village's population was 349 in 73 households. The following census in 2011 counted 262 people in 72 households. The 2016 census measured the population of the village as 224 people in 76 households.
