= Paband, Zanjan =

Village in Zanjan province, Iran

Paband Persian: پابند
- Village
- Location within Iran
- Coordinates: 36°15′57″N 48°46′30″E
- Country: Iran
- Province: Zanjan
- County: Khodabandeh
- District: Sojas Rud
- Rural District: Sojas Rud

Population (2016)
  - Total: 368
- Time zone: UTC+3:30 (IRST)

Paband (Persian: پابند) (Note: Also romanized as Pāband; also known as Pavand) is a village in Sojas Rud Rural District of Sojas Rud District in Khodabandeh County, Zanjan province, Iran.

== Demographics ==
=== Population ===
At the time of the 2006 National Census, the village's population was 560 in 134 households. The following census in 2011 counted 411 people in 121 households. The 2016 census measured the population of the village as 368 people in 119 households.
