= Sarin Darreh, Khodabandeh =

Village in Zanjan province, Iran

Sarin Darreh Persian: سرين دره
- Village
- Location within Iran
- Coordinates: 36°11′15″N 48°21′36″E
- Country: Iran
- Province: Zanjan
- County: Khodabandeh
- District: Sojas Rud
- Rural District: Aq Bolagh

Population (2016)
  - Total: 181
- Time zone: UTC+3:30 (IRST)

Sarin Darreh (Persian: سرين دره) (Note: Also romanized as Sarīn Darreh) is a village in Aq Bolagh Rural District of Sojas Rud District in Khodabandeh County, Zanjan province, Iran.

== Demographics ==
=== Population ===
At the time of the 2006 National Census, the village's population was 243 in 36 households. The following census in 2011 counted 225 people in 43 households. The 2016 census measured the population of the village as 181 people in 52 households.
