= Talkhab-e Sofla =

Talkhab-e Sofla تلخ اب سفلي
- Village
- Location within Iran
- Coordinates: 30°25′58″N 51°18′59″E
- Country: Iran
- Province: Fars
- County: Rostam
- Bakhsh: Sorna
- Rural District: Poshtkuh-e Rostam

Population (2006)
  - Total: 102
- Time zone: UTC+3:30 (IRST)
  - Summer (DST): UTC+4:30 (IRDT)

Talkhab-e Sofla (Persian: تلخ اب سفلي, also Romanized as Talkhāb-e Soflá; also known as Talkhāb-e Pā’īn) is a village in Poshtkuh-e Rostam Rural District, Sorna District, Rostam County, Fars province, Iran. At the 2006 census, its population was 102, in 21 families.
