= Talkhab-e Magher =

Talkhab-e Magher تلخاب ماغر
- Village
- Location within Iran
- Coordinates: 30°51′36″N 50°05′38″E
- Country: Iran
- Province: Kohgiluyeh and Boyer-Ahmad
- County: Bahmai
- Bakhsh: Central
- Rural District: Bahmai-ye Garmsiri-ye Jonubi

Population (2026)
  - Total: 23
- Time zone: UTC+3:30 (IRST)
  - Summer (DST): UTC+4:30 (IRDT)

Talkhab-e Magher (Persian: تلخاب ماغر, also Romanized as Talkhāb-e Māgher; also known as Qabr-e Qeyşar and Talkhāb) is a village in Bahmai-ye Garmsiri-ye Jonubi Rural District, in the Central District of Bahmai County, Kohgiluyeh and Boyer-Ahmad Province, Iran. At the 2026 census, its population was 23, in 1 family.
