= Talkh Ab-e Ahmadzadeh =

Talkh Ab-e Ahmadzadeh تلخاب احمدزاده
- Village
- Location within Iran
- Coordinates: 30°26′49″N 51°06′10″E
- Country: Iran
- Province: Kohgiluyeh and Boyer-Ahmad
- County: Basht
- Bakhsh: Basht
- Rural District: Babuyi

Population (2006)
  - Total: 39
- Time zone: UTC+3:30 (IRST)
  - Summer (DST): UTC+4:30 (IRDT)

Talkh Ab-e Ahmadzadeh (Persian: تلخاب احمدزاده, also Romanized as Talkh Āb-e Aḩmadzādeh; also known as Talkh Āb-e Mīr ‘Alī Bakesh) is a village in Babuyi Rural District, Basht District, Basht County, Kohgiluyeh and Boyer-Ahmad Province, Iran. At the 2006 census, its population was 39, in 9 families.
