= Talkhab-e Ahmadi =

Talkhab-e Ahmadi تلخاب احمدي
- Village
- Country: Iran
- Province: Khuzestan
- County: Izeh
- Bakhsh: Central
- Rural District: Howmeh-ye Gharbi

Population (2006)
  - Total: 110
- Time zone: UTC+3:30 (IRST)
  - Summer (DST): UTC+4:30 (IRDT)

Talkhab-e Ahmadi (Persian: تلخاب احمدي, also Romanized as Talkhāb-e Aḩmadī) is a village in Howmeh-ye Gharbi Rural District, in the Central District of Izeh County, Khuzestan Province, Iran. At the 2006 census, its population was 110, in 22 families.
