= Majidabad, Kamyaran =

Majidabad مجيد آباد
- Village
- Location within Iran
- Coordinates: 35°00′27″N 47°00′42″E
- Country: Iran
- Province: Kurdistan
- County: Kamyaran
- Bakhsh: Muchesh
- Rural District: Avalan

Population (2006)
  - Total: 53
- Time zone: UTC+3:30 (IRST)
  - Summer (DST): UTC+4:30 (IRDT)

Majidabad (Persian: مجيد آباد, also Romanized as Majīdābād) is a village in Avalan Rural District, Muchesh District, Kamyaran County, Kurdistan Province, Iran. At the 2006 census, its population was 53, in 15 families. The village is populated by Kurds.
