= Talkhab, Susan =

Talkhab تلخاب
- Village
- Location within Iran
- Coordinates: 31°57′11″N 50°00′08″E
- Country: Iran
- Province: Khuzestan
- County: Izeh
- Bakhsh: Susan
- Rural District: Susan-e Sharqi

Population (2006)
  - Total: 158
- Time zone: UTC+3:30 (IRST)
  - Summer (DST): UTC+4:30 (IRDT)

Talkhab (Persian: تلخاب, also Romanized as Talkhāb; also known as Talkhā) is a village in Susan-e Sharqi Rural District, Susan District, Izeh County, Khuzestan Province, Iran. At the 2006 census, its population was 158, in 33 families.
