= Talkh Ab-e Valad =

Talkh Ab-e Valad تلخاب ولد
- Village
- Location within Iran
- Coordinates: 29°57′11″N 51°00′37″E
- Country: Iran
- Province: Fars
- County: Mamasani
- Bakhsh: Mahvarmilani
- Rural District: Mishan

Population (2006)
  - Total: 40
- Time zone: UTC+3:30 (IRST)
  - Summer (DST): UTC+4:30 (IRDT)

Talkh Ab-e Valad (Persian: تلخاب ولد, also Romanized as Talkh Āb-e Valad; also known as Talkh Āb) is a village in Mishan Rural District, Mahvarmilani District, Mamasani County, Fars province, Iran. At the 2006 census, its population was 40, in 9 families.
