= Talkhab, Izeh =

Talkhab تلخاب
- Village
- Location within Iran
- Coordinates: 31°53′56″N 49°45′50″E
- Country: Iran
- Province: Khuzestan
- County: Izeh
- Bakhsh: Central
- Rural District: Howmeh-ye Gharbi

Population (2006)
  - Total: 308
- Time zone: UTC+3:30 (IRST)
  - Summer (DST): UTC+4:30 (IRDT)

Talkhab (Persian: تلخاب, also Romanized as Talkhāb) is a village in Howmeh-ye Gharbi Rural District, in the Central District of Izeh County, Khuzestan Province, Iran. At the 2006 census, its population was 308, in 51 families.
