= Majidabad, Khondab =

Majidabad مجيداباد
- Village
- Location within Iran
- Coordinates: 34°30′51″N 49°04′02″E
- Country: Iran
- Province: Markazi
- County: Khondab
- Bakhsh: Central
- Rural District: Deh Chal

Population (2006)
  - Total: 215
- Time zone: UTC+3:30 (IRST)
  - Summer (DST): UTC+4:30 (IRDT)

Majidabad (Persian: مجيداباد, also Romanized as Majīdābād) is a village in Deh Chal Rural District, in the Central District of Khondab County, Markazi Province, Iran. At the 2006 census, its population was 215, in 47 families.
