= Sheykh Musa, Mazandaran =

Sheykh Musa شيخ موسي
- Village
- Location within Iran
- Coordinates: 36°06′27″N 52°34′31″E
- Country: Iran
- Province: Mazandaran
- County: Babol
- Bakhsh: Bandpey-ye Sharqi
- Rural District: Firuzjah

Population (2006)
  - Total: 111
- Time zone: UTC+3:30 (IRST)
  - Summer (DST): UTC+4:30 (IRDT)

Sheykh Musa (Persian: شيخ موسي, also Romanized as Sheykh Mūsá) is a village in Firuzjah Rural District, Bandpey-ye Sharqi District, Babol County, Mazandaran Province, Iran. At the 2006 census, its population was 111, in 31 families.
