= Mashhad, Qazvin =

Mashhad مشهد
- Village
- Location within Iran
- Coordinates: 35°47′24″N 48°55′36″E
- Country: Iran
- Province: Qazvin
- County: Avaj
- Bakhsh: Central District
- Rural District: Hesar-e Valiyeasr

Population (2006)
  - Total: 71
- Time zone: UTC+3:30 (IRST)

Mashhad (Persian: مشهد) is a village in Hesar-e Valiyeasr Rural District, Central District, Avaj County, Qazvin Province, Iran. At the 2006 census, its population was 71, in 26 families.
