= Talkhab, Mahvarmilani =

Talkhab تلخ اب
- Village
- Location within Iran
- Coordinates: 30°01′10″N 51°23′35″E
- Country: Iran
- Province: Fars
- County: Mamasani
- Bakhsh: Mahvarmilani
- Rural District: Mahur

Population (2006)
  - Total: 86
- Time zone: UTC+3:30 (IRST)
  - Summer (DST): UTC+4:30 (IRDT)

Talkhab (Persian: تلخ اب, also Romanized as Talkhāb) is a village in Mahur Rural District, Mahvarmilani District, Mamasani County, Fars province, Iran. At the 2006 census, its population was 86, in 17 families.
