= Talkhab-e Hamzeh Ali =

Talkhab-e Hamzeh Ali تلخاب حمزه علي
- Village
- Location within Iran
- Coordinates: 32°05′52″N 49°32′43″E
- Country: Iran
- Province: Khuzestan
- County: Andika
- Bakhsh: Abezhdan
- Rural District: Kushk

Population (2006)
  - Total: 101
- Time zone: UTC+3:30 (IRST)
  - Summer (DST): UTC+4:30 (IRDT)

Talkhab-e Hamzeh Ali (Persian: تلخاب حمزه علي, also Romanized as Talkhāb-e Ḩamzeh ‘Alī) is a village in Kushk Rural District, Abezhdan District, Andika County, Khuzestan Province, Iran. At the 2006 census, its population was 101, in 18 families.
