= Majidabad, Qazvin =

Village in Qazvin province, Iran

Majidabad Persian: مجيداباد
- Village
- Location within Iran
- Coordinates: 35°50′17″N 49°55′24″E
- Country: Iran
- Province: Qazvin
- County: Buin Zahra
- District: Ramand
- Rural District: Ebrahimabad

Population (2016)
  - Total: 603
- Time zone: UTC+3:30 (IRST)

Majidabad (Persian: مجيداباد) (Note: Also romanized as Majīdābād) is a village in Ebrahimabad Rural District of Ramand District in Buin Zahra County, Qazvin province, Iran.

== Demographics ==
=== Population ===
At the time of the 2006 National Census, the village's population was 502 in 117 households. The following census in 2011 counted 598 people in 161 households. The 2016 census measured the population of the village as 603 people in 186 households.
