= Sojas Rud Rural District =

Rural district in Zanjan province, Iran

Sojas Rud Rural District Persian: دهستان سجاس رود
- Rural District
- Location within Iran
- Coordinates: 36°18′N 48°35′E
- Country: Iran
- Province: Zanjan
- County: Khodabandeh
- District: Sojas Rud
- Established: 1986
- Capital: Chuzak

Population (2016)
  - Total: 14,700
- Time zone: UTC+3:30 (IRST)

Sojas Rud Rural District (Persian: دهستان سجاس رود) is in Sojas Rud District of Khodabandeh County, Zanjan province, Iran. Its capital is the village of Chuzak. The previous capital of the rural district was the village of Sojas, now a city.

== Demographics ==
=== Population ===
At the time of the 2006 National Census, the rural district's population was 15,771 in 3,530 households. There were 15,569 inhabitants in 4,330 households at the following census of 2011. The 2016 census measured the population of the rural district as 14,700 in 4,398 households. The most populous of its 33 villages was Chuzak, with 1,787 people.

=== Other villages in the rural district ===
- Aqa Jari
- Bulamaji
- Chalakhvor
- Changur
- Changuri
- Dabanlu
- Dehjalal
- Duljin
- Emam Kandi
- Eslamabad
- Esperin
- Hasanabad
- Kabutarak
- Khandab
- Khomarak
- Khvosh
- Koshkabad
- Majidabad
- Mazidabad
- Mohammadabad
- Nahavis
- Nahrevan
- Paband
- Shur Ab
- Siaman
- Yengejeh
- Zarzar
- Zavinaq
