= Motamedabad =

Motamedabad معتمداباد
- Village
- Location within Iran
- Coordinates: 34°16′50″N 48°10′21″E
- Country: Iran
- Province: Hamadan
- County: Nahavand
- Bakhsh: Khezel
- Rural District: Solgi

Population (2006)
  - Total: 125
- Time zone: UTC+3:30 (IRST)
  - Summer (DST): UTC+4:30 (IRDT)

Motamedabad (Persian: معتمداباد, also Romanized as Mo‘tamedābād; also known as Majīdābād) is a village in Solgi Rural District, Khezel District, Nahavand County, Hamadan Province, Iran. At the 2006 census, its population was 125, in 33 families.
