= Farmahin =

City in Markazi province, Iran

Farmahin Persian: فرمهين
- City
- Location within Iran
- Coordinates: 34°30′16″N 49°41′19″E
- Country: Iran
- Province: Markazi
- County: Farahan
- District: Central
- Established as a city: 1994

Population (2016)
  - Total: 5,756
- Time zone: UTC+3:30 (IRST)

Farmahin (Persian: فرمهين) (Note: Also romanized as Farmahīn) is a city in the Central District of Farahan County, Markazi province, Iran, serving as capital of both the county and the district. It is also the administrative center for Farmahin Rural District. The village of Farmahin was converted to a city in 1994.

== Demographics ==
=== Population ===
At the time of the 2006 National Census, the city's population was 3,566 in 1,072 households, when it was capital of the former Farahan District in Tafresh County. The following census in 2011 counted 4,297 people in 1,337 households, by which time the district had been separated from the county in the establishment of Farahan County. The city and the rural district were transferred to the new Central District, with Farmahin as the county's capital. The 2016 census measured the population of the city as 5,756 people in 1,856 households.
