= Talkhab-e Nazer =

Talkhab-e Nazer تلخاب نظر
- Village
- Location within Iran
- Coordinates: 32°04′12″N 49°26′49″E
- Country: Iran
- Province: Khuzestan
- County: Andika
- Bakhsh: Abezhdan
- Rural District: Abezhdan

Population (2006)
  - Total: 502
- Time zone: UTC+3:30 (IRST)
  - Summer (DST): UTC+4:30 (IRDT)

Talkhab-e Nazer (Persian: تلخاب نظر, also Romanized as Talkhāb-e Naẓer; also known as Talkhāb) is a village in Abezhdan Rural District, Abezhdan District, Andika County, Khuzestan Province, Iran. At the 2006 census, its population was 502, in 89 families.
