= Koshkabad, Zanjan =

Village in Zanjan province, Iran

Koshkabad Persian: كشك اباد
- Village
- Location within Iran
- Coordinates: 36°17′34″N 48°45′25″E
- Country: Iran
- Province: Zanjan
- County: Khodabandeh
- District: Sojas Rud
- Rural District: Sojas Rud

Population (2016)
  - Total: 370
- Time zone: UTC+3:30 (IRST)

Koshkabad (Persian: كشك اباد) (Note: Also romanized as Koshkābād; also known as Khushkabad, Koshgābād, Kūshakābād, and Kūshkābād) is a village in Sojas Rud Rural District of Sojas Rud District in Khodabandeh County, Zanjan province, Iran.

== Demographics ==
=== Population ===
At the time of the 2006 National Census, the village's population was 620 in 121 households. The following census in 2011 counted 462 people in 113 households. The 2016 census measured the population of the village as 370 people in 96 households.
