= Majidabad, Mazandaran =

Majidabad مجيداباد
- Village
- Location within Iran
- Coordinates: 36°32′24″N 52°30′08″E
- Country: Iran
- Province: Mazandaran
- County: Amol
- Bakhsh: Dabudasht
- Rural District: Dabuy-ye Jonubi

Population (2006)
  - Total: 85
- Time zone: UTC+3:30 (IRST)
  - Summer (DST): UTC+4:30 (IRDT)

Majidabad (Persian: مجيداباد, also Romanized as Majīdābād) is a village in Dabuy-ye Jonubi Rural District, Dabudasht District, Amol County, Mazandaran Province, Iran. At the 2006 census, its population was 85, in 23 families.
