= Shoaymat-e Yek =

Shoaymat-e Yek شعيمطيك
- Village
- Location within Iran
- Coordinates: 31°29′16″N 48°46′53″E
- Country: Iran
- Province: Khuzestan
- County: Ahvaz
- Bakhsh: Central
- Rural District: Anaqcheh

Population (2006)
  - Total: 57
- Time zone: UTC+3:30 (IRST)
  - Summer (DST): UTC+4:30 (IRDT)

Shoaymat-e Yek (Persian: شعيمطيك, also Romanized as Sho‘aymaţ-e Yek; also known as Majīdābād, Sha‘mīţ, Sho‘aimate Bavi, Sho‘amyaţ-e Yek, and Sho‘eymeţ-e Bāvī) is a village in Anaqcheh Rural District, in the Central District of Ahvaz County, Khuzestan Province, Iran. At the 2006 census, its population was 57, in 11 families.
