= Talkhab-e Khun Ali =

Talkhab-e Khun Ali تلخاب خونعلي
- Village
- Country: Iran
- Province: Khuzestan
- County: Andika
- Bakhsh: Abezhdan
- Rural District: Kushk

Population (2006)
  - Total: 65
- Time zone: UTC+3:30 (IRST)
  - Summer (DST): UTC+4:30 (IRDT)

Talkhab-e Khun Ali (Persian: تلخاب خونعلي, also Romanized as Talkhab-e Khūn ʿAlī) is a village in Kushk Rural District, Abezhdan District, Andika County, Khuzestan Province, Iran. At the 2006 census, its population was 65, in 11 families.
