= Talkhab-e Sofla Bidak =

Talkhab-e Sofla Bidak تلخاب سفلي بيدك
- Village
- Location within Iran
- Coordinates: 30°26′10″N 51°07′19″E
- Country: Iran
- Province: Kohgiluyeh and Boyer-Ahmad
- County: Basht
- Bakhsh: Central
- Rural District: Kuh Mareh Khami

Population (2006)
  - Total: 198
- Time zone: UTC+3:30 (IRST)
  - Summer (DST): UTC+4:30 (IRDT)

Talkhab-e Sofla Bidak (Persian: تلخاب سفلي بيدك, also Romanized as Talkhāb-e Soflá Bīdak; also known as Talkhāb-e Soflásādāt-e Bīdak) is a village in Kuh Mareh Khami Rural District, in the Central District of Basht County, Kohgiluyeh and Boyer-Ahmad Province, Iran. At the 2006 census, its population was 198, in 42 families.
