= Talkh Ab-e Zardpatak =

Talkh Ab-e Zardpatak تلخاب زردپتك
- Village
- Country: Iran
- Province: Khuzestan
- County: Bagh-e Malek
- Bakhsh: Meydavud
- Rural District: Saroleh

Population (2006)
  - Total: 36
- Time zone: UTC+3:30 (IRST)
  - Summer (DST): UTC+4:30 (IRDT)

Talkh Ab-e Zardpatak (Persian: تلخاب زردپتك, also Romanized as Talkh Āb-e Zardpataḵ) is a village in Saroleh Rural District, Meydavud District, Bagh-e Malek County, Khuzestan Province, Iran. At the 2006 census, its population was 36, in 6 families.
