= Talkhab, Hendmini =

Talkhab تلخاب
- Village
- Location within Iran
- Coordinates: 33°16′31″N 47°12′32″E
- Country: Iran
- Province: Ilam
- County: Darreh Shahr
- Bakhsh: Badreh
- Rural District: Hendmini

Population (2006)
  - Total: 786
- Time zone: UTC+3:30 (IRST)
  - Summer (DST): UTC+4:30 (IRDT)

Talkhab (Persian: تلخاب, also Romanized as Talkhāb; also known as Talkh Āb) is a village in Hendmini Rural District, Badreh District, Darreh Shahr County, Ilam Province, Iran. In the 2006 census, its population was 786, in 156 families. The village is populated by Lurs.
