= Talkhab-e Dishmuk =

Talkhab-e Dishmuk تلخاب ديشموك
- Village
- Location within Iran
- Coordinates: 30°47′47″N 50°53′12″E
- Country: Iran
- Province: Kohgiluyeh and Boyer-Ahmad
- County: Kohgiluyeh
- Bakhsh: Dishmok
- Rural District: Bahmayi-ye Sarhadi-ye Sharqi

Population (2006)
  - Total: 26
- Time zone: UTC+3:30 (IRST)
  - Summer (DST): UTC+4:30 (IRDT)

Talkhab-e Dishmuk (Persian: تلخاب ديشموك, also Romanized as Talkhāb-e Dīshmūk; also known as Moḩammad Rashīd, Talkh Āb-e Pā’īn, and Talkhāb-e Soflá) is a village in Bahmayi-ye Sarhadi-ye Sharqi Rural District, Dishmok District, Kohgiluyeh County, Kohgiluyeh and Boyer-Ahmad Province, Iran. At the 2006 census, its population was 26, in 4 families.
