= Feshk Rural District =

Rural district in Markazi province, Iran

Feshk Rural District Persian: دهستان فشک
- Rural District
- Location within Iran
- Coordinates: 34°40′N 49°46′E
- Country: Iran
- Province: Markazi
- County: Farahan
- District: Central
- Established: 1987
- Capital: Feshk

Population (2016)
  - Total: 2,636
- Time zone: UTC+3:30 (IRST)

Feshk Rural District (Persian: دهستان فشک) is in the Central District of Farahan County, Markazi province, Iran. Its capital is the village of Feshk.

== Demographics ==
=== Population ===
At the time of the 2006 National Census, the rural district's population (as a part of the former Farahan District in Tafresh County) was 6,956 in 2,075 households. There were 2,663 inhabitants in 963 households at the following census of 2011, by which time the district had been separated from the county in the establishment of Farahan County. The rural district was transferred to the new Central District. The 2016 census measured the population of the rural district as 2,636 in 1,034 households. The most populous of its 15 villages was Feshk, with 1,140 people.

=== Other villages in the rural district ===
- Ayr
- Dermanak
- Guneh
- Kala
- Kazemabad
- Khosravan-e Olya
- Khosravan-e Sofla
- Kordabad
- Master
- Ortagol
- Qermez Cheshmeh
- Vasheqan
