= Khenejin Rural District =

Rural district in Markazi province, Iran

Khenejin Rural District Persian: دهستان خنجین
- Rural District
- Location within Iran
- Coordinates: 34°49′N 49°33′E
- Country: Iran
- Province: Markazi
- County: Farahan
- District: Khenejin
- Established: 1987
- Capital: Khenejin

Population (2016)
  - Total: 2,838
- Time zone: UTC+3:30 (IRST)

Khenejin Rural District (Persian: دهستان خنجین) is in Khenejin District of Farahan County, Markazi province, Iran. It is administered from the city of Khenejin.

== Demographics ==
=== Population ===
At the time of the 2006 National Census, the rural district's population (as a part of the Central District in Komijan County) was 10,317 in 2,611 households. There were 5,897 inhabitants in 1,793 households at the following census of 2011, by which time the rural district had been separated from the county in the establishment of Farahan County. The rural district was transferred to the new Khenejin District. The 2016 census measured the population of the rural district as 2,838 in 884 households. The most populous of its nine villages was Salimabad, with 991 people.

=== Other villages in the rural district ===
- Chowgan
- Darvishan
- Fardeqan
- Gurchan
- Kasr-e Asef
- Malek Baghi
- Rakin
