= Farmahin Rural District =

Rural district in Markazi province, Iran

Farmahin Rural District Persian: دهستان فرمهين
- Rural District
- Location within Iran
- Coordinates: 34°29′N 49°36′E
- Country: Iran
- Province: Markazi
- County: Farahan
- District: Central
- Established: 1987
- Capital: Farmahin

Population (2016)
  - Total: 7,845
- Time zone: UTC+3:30 (IRST)

Farmahin Rural District (Persian: دهستان فرمهين) is in the Central District of Farahan County, Markazi province, Iran. It is administered from the city of Farmahin.

== Demographics ==
=== Population ===
At the time of the 2006 National Census, the rural district's population (as a part of the former Farahan District in Tafresh County) was 12,220 in 3,519 households. There were 10,158 inhabitants in 3,312 households at the following census of 2011, by which time the district had been separated from the county in the establishment of Farahan County. The rural district was transferred to the new Central District. The 2016 census measured the population of the rural district as 7,845 in 2,795 households. The most populous of its 43 villages was Ghiasabad, with 1,231 people.

=== Other villages in the rural district ===
- Ahangaran
- Aqa Ziarat
- Azizabad
- Dastjan
- Kudzar
- Majdabad-e Kohneh
- Shotoriyeh
- Tabarteh
