= Khenejin District =

District in Markazi province, Iran

Khenejin District Persian: بخش خنجین
- District
- Location within Iran
- Coordinates: 34°46′N 49°35′E
- Country: Iran
- Province: Markazi
- County: Farahan
- Established: 2011
- Capital: Khenejin

Population (2016)
  - Total: 12,757
- Time zone: UTC+3:30 (IRST)

Khenejin District (Persian: بخش خنجین) is in Farahan County, Markazi province, Iran. Its capital is the city of Khenejin.

== History ==
In 2011, Khenejin Rural District was separated from Komijan County, and Farahan District from Tafresh County, in the establishment of Farahan County, which was divided into two districts of two rural districts each, with Farmahin as its capital and only city the time.

The village of Talkh Ab was converted to a city in 2018.

== Demographics ==
=== Population ===
At the time of the 2011 National Census, the district's population was 12,924 people in 3,842 households. The 2016 census measured the population of the district as 12,757 inhabitants in 4,059 households.

=== Administrative divisions ===
Khenejin District Population
Administrative Divisions	2011	2016
Khenejin RD	5,897	2,838
Talkh Ab RD	7,027	6,684
Khenejin (city)		3,235
Talkh Ab (city) (Note: Became a city after the 2016 census)		
Total	12,924	12,757
RD = Rural District
