= Farahan District =

Former district in Markazi province, Iran

Farahan District Persian: بخش فراهان
- Former District
- Location within Iran
- Coordinates: 34°32′N 49°40′E
- Country: Iran
- Province: Markazi
- County: Tafresh
- Capital: Farmahin

Population (2006)
  - Total: 22,742
- Time zone: UTC+3:30 (IRST)

Farahan District (Persian: بخش فراهان) is a former administrative division of Tafresh County, Markazi province, Iran. Its capital was the city of Farmahin.

== History ==
In 2011, the district was separated from the county in the establishment of Farahan County.

== Demographics ==
=== Population ===
At the time of the 2006 National Census, the district's population was 22,742 in 6,666 households.

=== Administrative divisions ===
Farahan District Population
Administrative Divisions	2006
Farmahin RD	12,220
Feshk RD	6,956
Farmahin (city)	3,566
Total	22,742
RD = Rural District
