= Central District (Farahan County) =

District in Markazi province, Iran

Central District (Farahan County) Persian: بخش مرکزی شهرستان فراهان
- District
- Location within Iran
- Coordinates: 34°32′N 49°40′E
- Country: Iran
- Province: Markazi
- County: Farahan
- Established: 2011
- Capital: Farmahin

Population (2016)
  - Total: 16,237
- Time zone: UTC+3:30 (IRST)

The Central District of Farahan County (Persian: بخش مرکزی شهرستان فراهان) is in Markazi province, Iran. Its capital is the city of Farmahin.

== History ==
In 2011, Khenejin Rural District was separated from Komijan County, and Farahan District from Tafresh County, in the establishment of Farahan County, which was divided into two districts of two rural districts each, with Farmahin as its capital and only city at the time.

== Demographics ==
=== Population ===
At the time of the 2011 National Census, the district's population was 17,118 people in 5,612 households, by which time the district had been separated from the county in the establishment of Farahan County. The 2016 census measured the population of the district as 16,237 inhabitants in 5,685 households.

=== Administrative divisions ===
Central District (Farahan County) Population
Administrative Divisions	2011	2016
Farmahin RD	10,158	7,845
Feshk RD	2,663	2,636
Farmahin (city)	4,297	5,756
Total	17,118	16,237
RD = Rural District
