= Tafresh County =

County in Markazi Province, Iran

Tafresh County Persian: شهرستان تفرش
- County
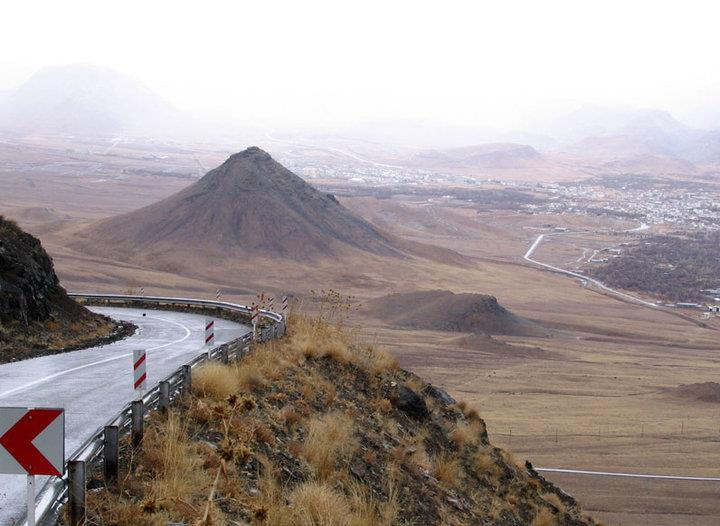
- The city of Tafresh from Mount Gandom

- Location of Tafresh County in Markazi province (top center, green)

- Location of Markazi province in Iran
- Coordinates: 34°48′N 49°53′E
- Country: Iran
- Province: Markazi
- Capital: Tafresh
- Districts: Central

Population (2016)
  - Total: 24,913
- Time zone: UTC+3:30 (IRST)

Tafresh County (Persian: شهرستان تفرش (Note: Also romanized as Ŝahrestāne Tafreŝ) is in Markazi province, Iran. Its capital is the city of Tafresh.

== History ==
In 2011, Farahan District was separated from the county in the establishment of Farahan County.

== Demographics ==
=== Population ===
At the time of the 2006 National Census, the county's population was 46,680 in 14,313 households. The following census in 2011 counted 25,912 people in 8,372 households. The 2016 census measured the population of the county as 24,913 in 8,588 households.

=== Administrative divisions ===
Tafresh County's population history and administrative structure over three consecutive censuses are shown in the following table.

Tafresh County Population
| Administrative Divisions | 2006 | 2011 | 2016 |
|---|---|---|---|
| Central District | 23,938 | 25,912 | 24,913 |
| Bazarjan RD | 3,779 | 3,540 | 3,429 |
| Kharrazan RD | 1,102 | 1,303 | 861 |
| Kuh Panah RD | 1,487 | 1,334 | 1,114 |
| Rudbar RD | 3,656 | 3,288 | 3,016 |
| Tafresh (city) | 13,914 | 16,447 | 16,493 |
| Farahan District (Note: Transferred to Farahan County) | 22,742 | | |
| Farmahin RD | 12,220 | | |
| Feshk RD | 6,956 | | |
| Farmahin (city) | 3,566 | | |
| Total | 46,680 | 25,912 | 24,913 |
RD = Rural District

== See also ==
Media related to Tafresh County at Wikimedia Commons
