= Farahan County =

County in Markazi province, Iran

Farahan County Persian: شهرستان فراهان
- County
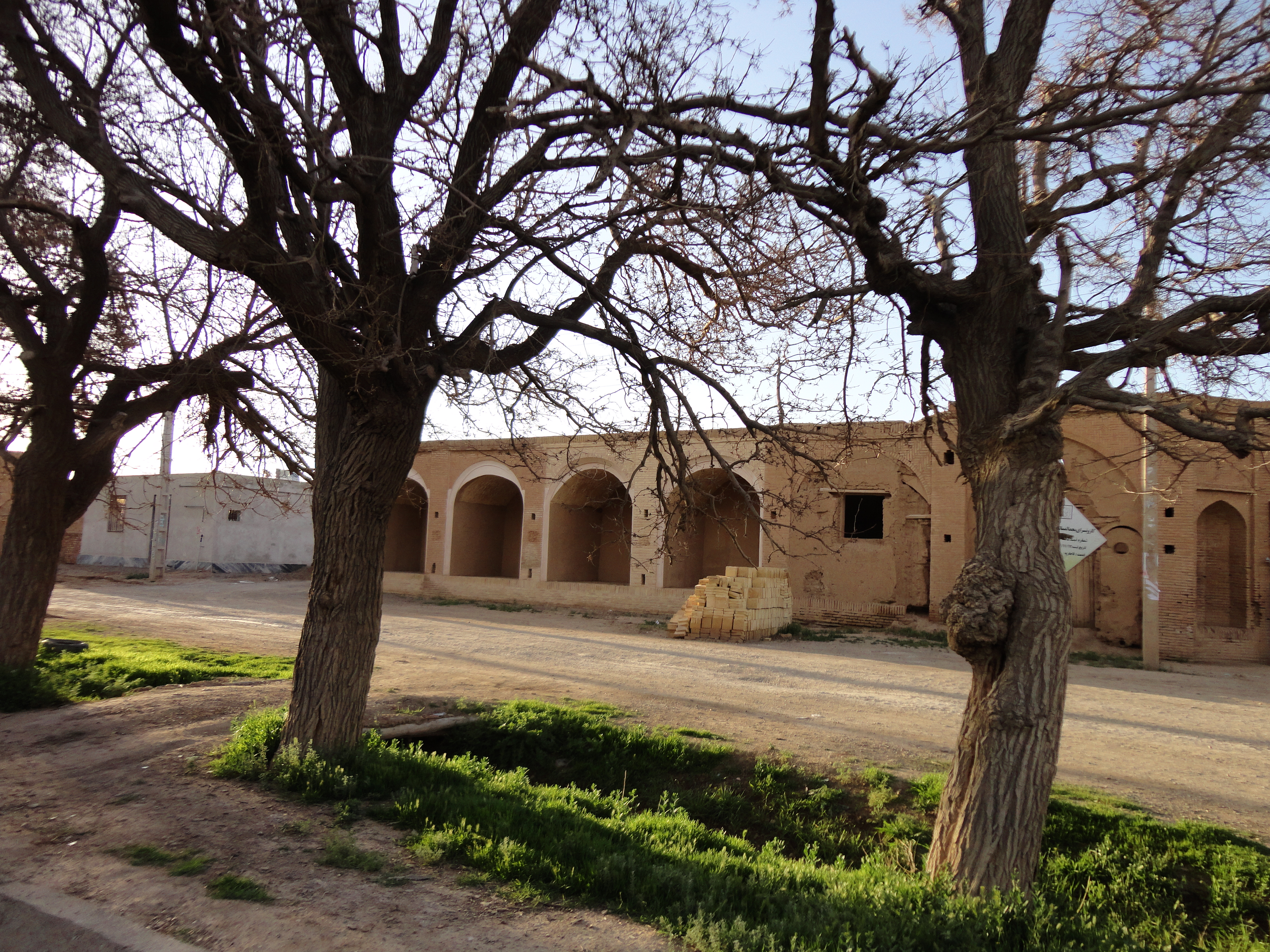
- Majed ol Malek Caravanserai in Dolatabad

- Location of Farahan County in Markazi province (center, pink)

- Location of Markazi province in Iran
- Coordinates: 34°38′N 49°39′E
- Country: Iran
- Province: Markazi
- Established: 2011
- Capital: Farmahin
- Districts: Central, Khenejin

Population (2016)
  - Total: 28,994
- Time zone: UTC+3:30 (IRST)

Farahan County (Persian: شهرستان فراهان) (Note: Also romanized as Ŝahrestāne Farāhān) is in Markazi province, Iran. Its capital is the city of Farmahin.

== History ==
In 2011, Khenejin Rural District was separated from Komijan County, and Farahan District from Tafresh County, in the establishment of Farahan County, which was divided into two districts of two rural districts each, with Farmahin as its capital and only city at the time. The village of Talkh Ab was converted to a city in 2018.

== Demographics ==
=== Language ===
The majority of the county’s population are Persians who speak the Persian language.

=== Population ===
At the time of the 2011 National Census, the county's population was 30,042 people in 9,535 households. The 2016 census measured the population of the county as 28,994 in 9,744 households.

=== Administrative divisions ===
Farahan County's population history and administrative structure over two consecutive censuses are shown in the following table.

Farahan County Population
Administrative Divisions	2011	2016
Central District	17,118	16,237
Farmahin RD	10,158	7,845
Feshk RD	2,663	2,636
Farmahin (city)	4,297	5,756
Khenejin District	12,924	12,757
Khenejin RD	5,897	2,838
Talkh Ab RD	7,027	6,684
Khenejin (city)		3,235
Talkh Ab (city) (Note: Became a city after the 2016 census)		
Total	30,042	28,994
RD = Rural District

== See also ==
Media related to Farahan County at Wikimedia Commons
