= Sojas Rud District =

District in Zanjan province, Iran

Sojas Rud District Persian: بخش سجاس‌ رود
- District
- Location within Iran
- Coordinates: 36°17′N 48°33′E
- Country: Iran
- Province: Zanjan
- County: Khodabandeh
- Established: 1995
- Capital: Sojas

Population (2016)
  - Total: 26,965
- Time zone: UTC+3:30 (IRST)

Sojas Rud District (Persian: بخش سجاس ‌رود) is in Khodabandeh County, Zanjan province, Iran. Its capital is the city of Sojas.

== Demographics ==
=== Population ===
At the time of the 2006 National Census, the district's population was 27,344 in 6,101 households. The following census in 2011 counted 27,992 people in 7,516 households. The 2016 census measured the population of the district as 26,965 inhabitants in 7,939 households.

=== Administrative divisions ===
Sojas Rud District Population
| Administrative Divisions | 2006 | 2011 | 2016 |
|---|---|---|---|
| Aq Bolagh RD | 5,996 | 5,757 | 5,228 |
| Sojas Rud RD | 15,771 | 15,569 | 14,700 |
| Sojas (city) | 5,577 | 6,666 | 7,037 |
| Total | 27,344 | 27,992 | 26,965 |
RD = Rural District
