= Farisabad =

Village in Markazi province, Iran

Farisabad Persian: فريس اباد
- Village
- Location within Iran
- Coordinates: 34°46′05″N 49°15′43″E
- Country: Iran
- Province: Markazi
- County: Komijan
- District: Central
- Rural District: Vafs

Population (2016)
  - Total: 120
- Time zone: UTC+3:30 (IRST)

Farisabad (Persian: فريس اباد) (Note: Also romanized as Farīsābād; also known as Farasābād, Farsābād, and Paresābād) is a village in Vafs Rural District of the Central District in Komijan County, Markazi province, Iran.

== Demographics ==
=== Population ===
At the time of the 2006 National Census, the village's population was 77 in 18 households, when it was in Khosrow Beyk Rural District of Milajerd District. The following census in 2011 counted 87 people in 25 households, by which time Farisabad had been transferred to Vafs Rural District created in the Central District. The 2016 census measured the population of the village as 120 people in 39 households.
