= Chehreqan =

Village in Markazi province, Iran

Chehreqan Persian: چهرقان
- Village
- Location within Iran
- Coordinates: 34°50′43″N 49°15′28″E
- Country: Iran
- Province: Markazi
- County: Komijan
- District: Central
- Rural District: Vafs

Population (2016)
  - Total: 1,413
- Time zone: UTC+3:30 (IRST)

Chehreqan (Persian: چهرقان) (Note: Also romanized as Chehraqān and Chehreqān; also known as Charāghān and Cherāghān) is a village in Vafs Rural District of the Central District in Komijan County, Markazi province, Iran.

== Demographics ==
=== Language ===
The inhabitants speak Tati.

=== Population ===
At the time of the 2006 National Census, the village's population was 1,580 in 415 households, when it was in Khosrow Beyk Rural District of Milajerd District. The following census in 2011 counted 1,621 people in 485 households, by which time Chehreqan had been transferred to Vafs Rural District created in the Central District. The 2016 census measured the population of the village as 1,413 people in 439 households.
