= Amereh, Markazi =

Village in Markazi province, Iran

Amereh Persian: امره
- Village
- Location within Iran
- Coordinates: 34°48′42″N 49°17′25″E
- Country: Iran
- Province: Markazi
- County: Komijan
- District: Central
- Rural District: Vafs

Population (2016)
  - Total: 239
- Time zone: UTC+3:30 (IRST)

Amereh (Persian: امره) (Note: Also romanized as Āmereh; also known as Amāra) is a village in Vafs Rural District of the Central District in Komijan County, Markazi province, Iran.

== Demographics ==
=== Population ===
At the time of the 2006 National Census, the village's population was 416 in 128 households, when it was in Khosrow Beyk Rural District of Milajerd District. The following census in 2011 counted 281 people in 104 households, by which time Amereh had been transferred to Vafs Rural District created in the Central District. The 2016 census measured the population of the village as 239 people in 94 households.
