= Valazjerd, Markazi =

Village in Markazi province, Iran

Valazjerd Persian: ولازجرد
- Village
- Location within Iran
- Coordinates: 34°47′07″N 49°16′46″E
- Country: Iran
- Province: Markazi
- County: Komijan
- District: Central
- Rural District: Vafs

Population (2016)
  - Total: 137
- Time zone: UTC+3:30 (IRST)

Valazjerd (Persian: ولازجرد) (Note: Also romanized as Valāzjerd, Vālāzjerd, and Velāzjerd; also known as Waliajigār and Zejerd) is a village in Vafs Rural District of the Central District in Komijan County, Markazi province, Iran.

== Demographics ==
=== Population ===
At the time of the 2006 National Census, the village's population was 59 in 20 households, when it was in Khosrow Beyk Rural District of Milajerd District. The following census in 2011 counted 151 people in 51 households, by which time Valazjerd had been transferred to Vafs Rural District created in the Central District. The 2016 census measured the population of the village as 137 people in 50 households.
