= Fazlabad, Markazi =

Village in Markazi province, Iran

Fazlabad Persian: فضل اباد
- Village
- Location within Iran
- Coordinates: 34°43′39″N 49°23′18″E
- Country: Iran
- Province: Markazi
- County: Komijan
- District: Central
- Rural District: Vafs

Population (2016)
  - Total: 463
- Time zone: UTC+3:30 (IRST)

Fazlabad (Persian: فضل اباد) (Note: Also romanized as Faẕlābād) is a village in Vafs Rural District of the Central District in Komijan County, Markazi province, Iran.

== Demographics ==
=== Population ===
At the time of the 2006 National Census, the village's population was 593 in 161 households, when it was in Esfandan Rural District. The following census in 2011 counted 590 people in 181 households, by which time Fazlabad had been transferred to Vafs Rural District created in the same district. The 2016 census measured the population of the village as 463 people in 144 households.
