= Vafs, Markazi =

Village in Markazi province, Iran

Vafs Persian: وفس
- Village
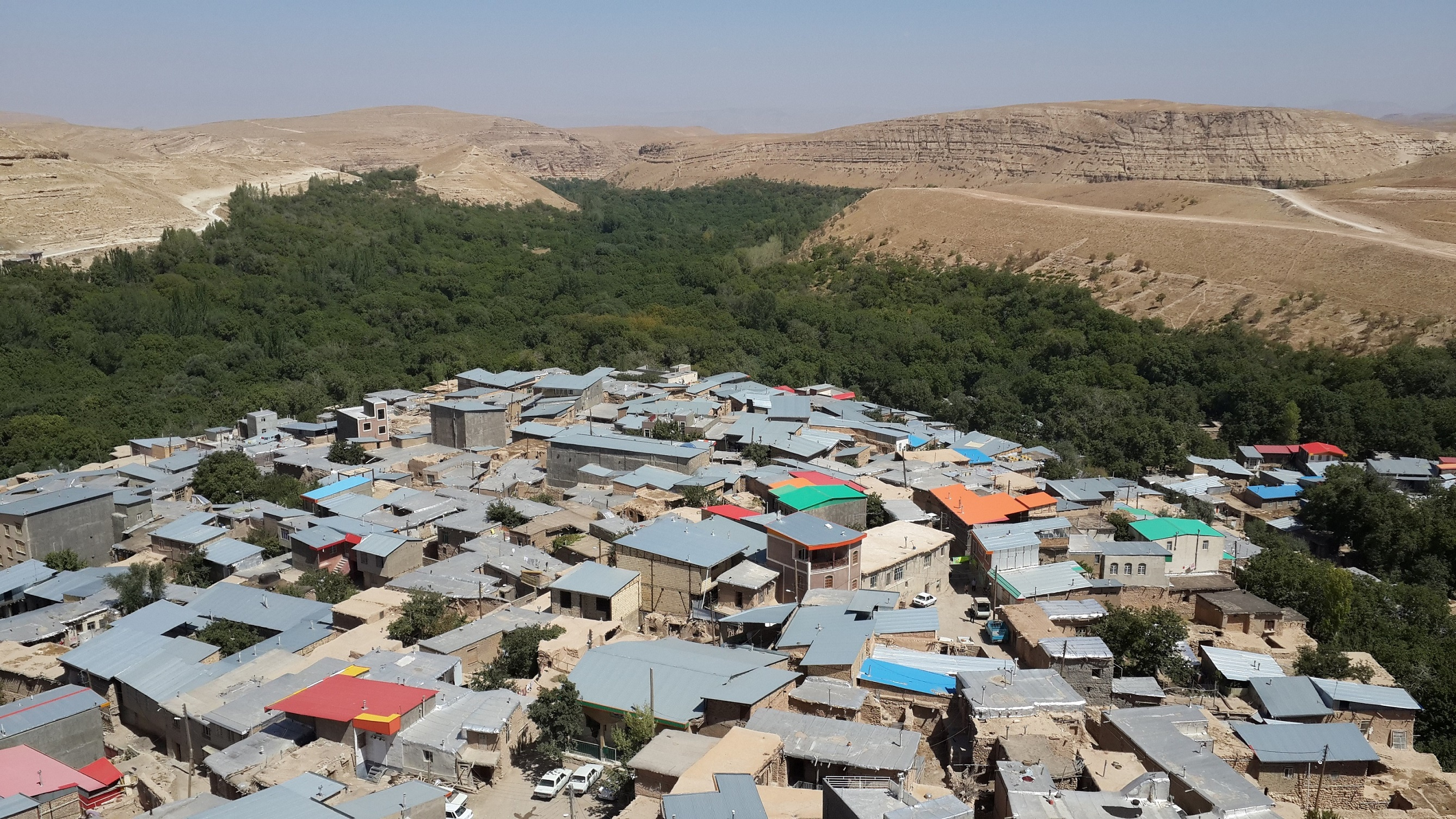
- The village of Vafs

- Location within Iran
- Coordinates: 34°50′52″N 49°22′56″E
- Country: Iran
- Province: Markazi
- County: Komijan
- District: Central
- Rural District: Vafs

Population (2016)
  - Total: 1,365
- Time zone: UTC+3:30 (IRST)

Vafs (Persian: وفس) (Note: In Tati also known as Vabs and Waūs) is a village in Vafs Rural District of the Central District in Komijan County, Markazi province, Iran. The inhabitants speak Tati language.

== Overview ==
The distance from Vafs to the city of Komijan is 15 kilometers, and it is 110 kilometers away from Arak, the provincial capital. Vafs is a green village with 12 neighborhoods. Its water supply comes from 8 qanats and more than 30 springs, with the spring water being drinkable. The village has 14 mosques.

Many of the houses in this village have preserved the traditional architectural style of Markazi province region; however, this old texture is at risk. In the past, Vafs had fortress-like walls with 12 towers, of which only four remain today in a semi-ruined state. There is also an old bathhouse in Vafs. Nowadays, many residents of Vafs have migrated and settled in the cities of Arak, Qom, Tehran, and elsewhere.

== Demographics ==
=== Language ===
Vafsi refers to the language of people of four villages in west central Iran: Vafs, Chehreqân, Gurchân and Farg in Markazi province, and is regarded as a north-western Iranian language. It shares similarities with Ashtiyani, Amore'i and Tafreshi dialects, and has also been influenced by Taleshi and some central Iranian dialects. Actually, it is believed that Vafsi is a mixture of Tati and the Iranian central dialects, and due to the special geographic situation of Vafs, it has kept many of its basic historical characteristics. The first studies on this dialect were carried out in the 1950s by M. Moghaddam, but the major scientific and systematic studies of this dialect belong to Donald Stilo, the editor of the current book.

Vafsi Folk Tales is a collection of 24 stories, which were collected by the British Iranist, L. P. Elwell-Sutton in 1958, and have been transcribed, translated and annotated by Donald Stilo. The dialect of Vafsi used in these tales is Gurchani.

=== Population ===
At the time of the 2006 National Census, the village's population was 1,607 in 509 households, when it was in Esfandan Rural District. The following census in 2011 counted 1,459 people in 540 households, by which time Vafs had been transferred to Vafs Rural District created in the same district. The 2016 census measured the population of the village as 1,365 people in 492 households.

== Geography ==
Vafs is a mountainous village surrounded by mountains, residential areas, and orchards. The houses are built on the mountain slopes, while the orchards are located in the valleys, forming a terraced landscape. The foothills with gentle slopes and minimal rocky terrain have been converted into agricultural land. The highest point in Vafs is Mount Qelenje, with an elevation of approximately 2,745 meters. This mountain is located to the south of Vafs. The lowest point in Vafs is a spot in the vast plain of Anjoman, situated to the north of the village, at an elevation of about 1,550 meters.

The village of Vafs stretches approximately 23 kilometers and is aligned in a north-south direction.

More than 90 percent of the houses in Vafs are built on the slopes of Mount Sar-Qaleh (also known as Mosalla). Most of them are located on the northern slope, while a smaller percentage are situated on the western and eastern slopes. The highest peak of this mountain reaches 2,250 meters, but the houses are built at elevations below 2,170 meters.

The western slope, which is less lush, serves as the route for the Komijan-Vafs road, whereas the eastern slope is more fertile and largely covered with trees and vegetation.

The houses are built on stone foundations, with cellars and stables extending into the mountain. Many of the underground rooms and tunnels in Vafs, which once served as shelters and places of refuge during difficult and dangerous times, were excavated within this mountain.

The mountain is named Sar-Qaleh because, in previous centuries, the "Sar-Qaleh Gate" was one of the two gates of the Vafs Fortress, marking the highest point of the residential area on this mountain. It is also known as Mosalla, as it has been a site for public and special prayers, including Eid al-Fitr prayers and rain prayers, held on its relatively flat surface.

To the north of Vafs lies a vast and relatively fertile plain known as Dasht-e Anjoman among the locals.

Dasht-e Anjoman, which today mainly serves as pastureland for livestock, shepherds, and seasonal farmers, was, in the not-so-distant past, home to fortified and prosperous castles belonging to the local rulers of Vafs. In even earlier times, it is believed to have been the primary residential area for the people of Vafs.

Approximately 2.5 kilometers northeast of the village, on the western slope of a valley overlooking Vafs, lies an abandoned mine known locally as Khak-e Zard (Yellow Soil). Field studies indicate that this mineral deposit consists of yellowish-red marl layers, ranging from 1–2 centimeters to a maximum of 30–40 centimeters thick, containing iron oxide. These layers are interbedded within OM(l q) limestone formations. According to local accounts, in the distant past, rocks in the area were shattered using explosive methods, and the extracted yellow soil was collected and transported to paint factories. Today, the mine is inactive. On the eastern slope of the same area, directly across from the old mine, another untouched deposit of the same mineral is visible and is considered a recognized mineral occurrence.

== Gallery ==
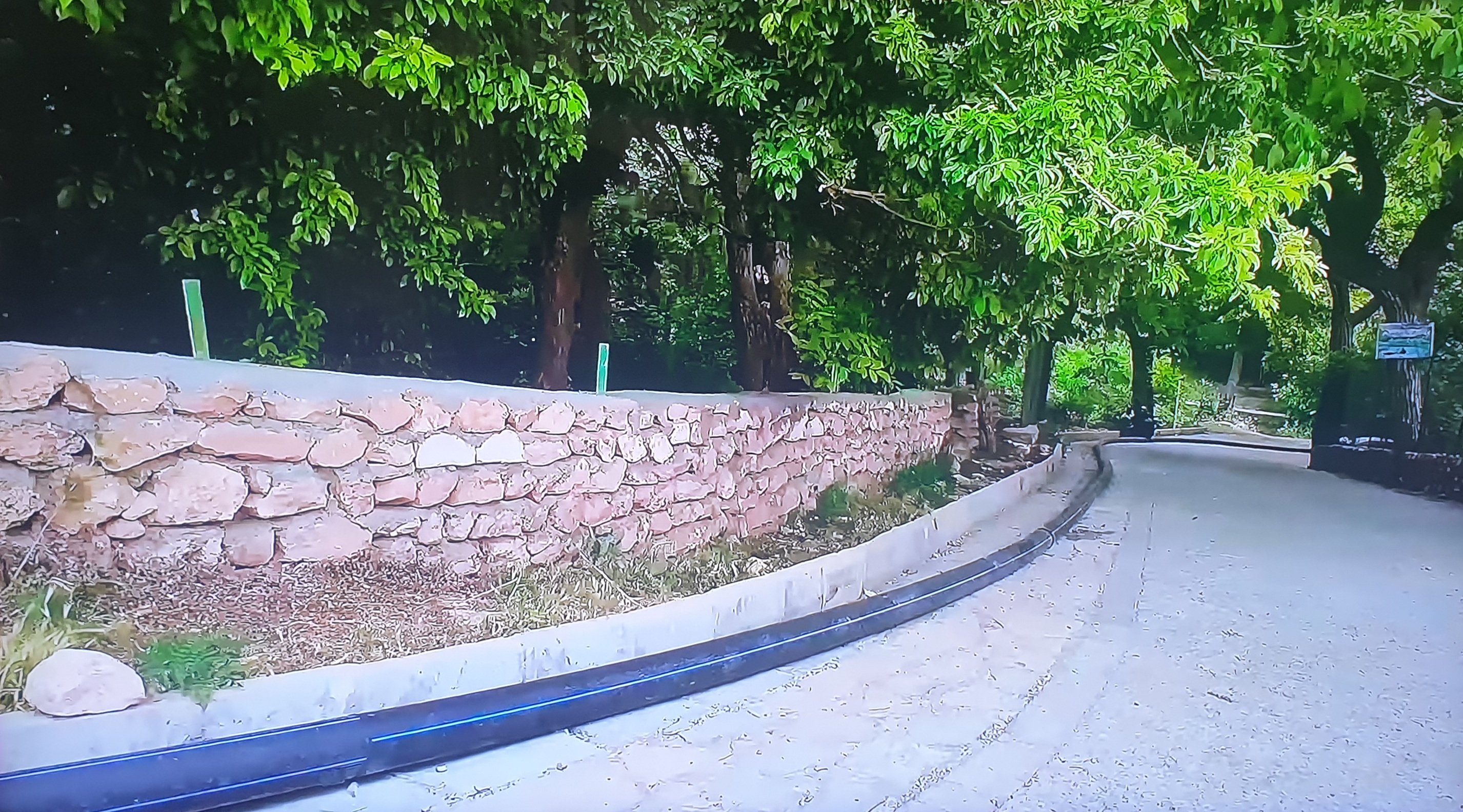
Entrance road to Vafs

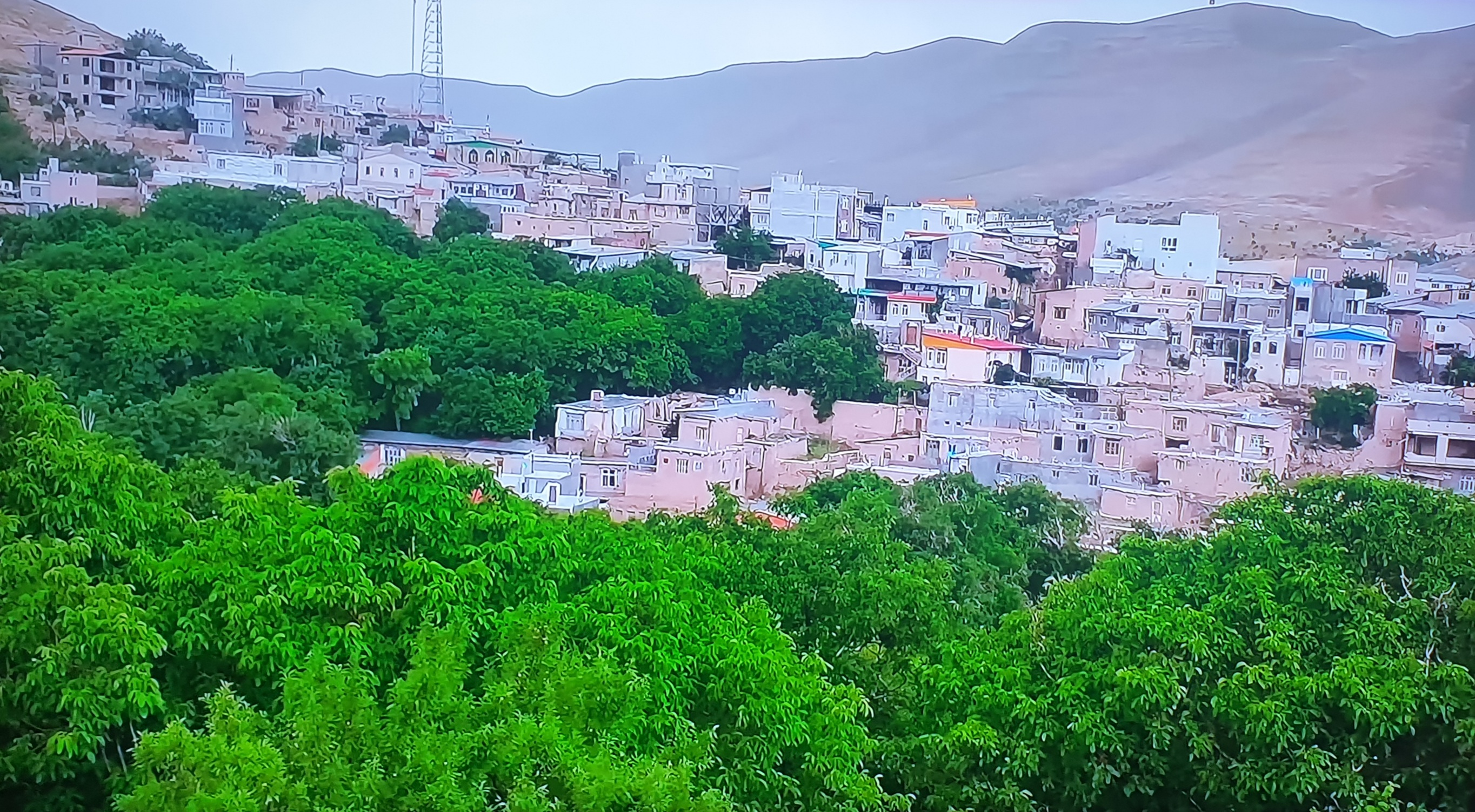
Vafs

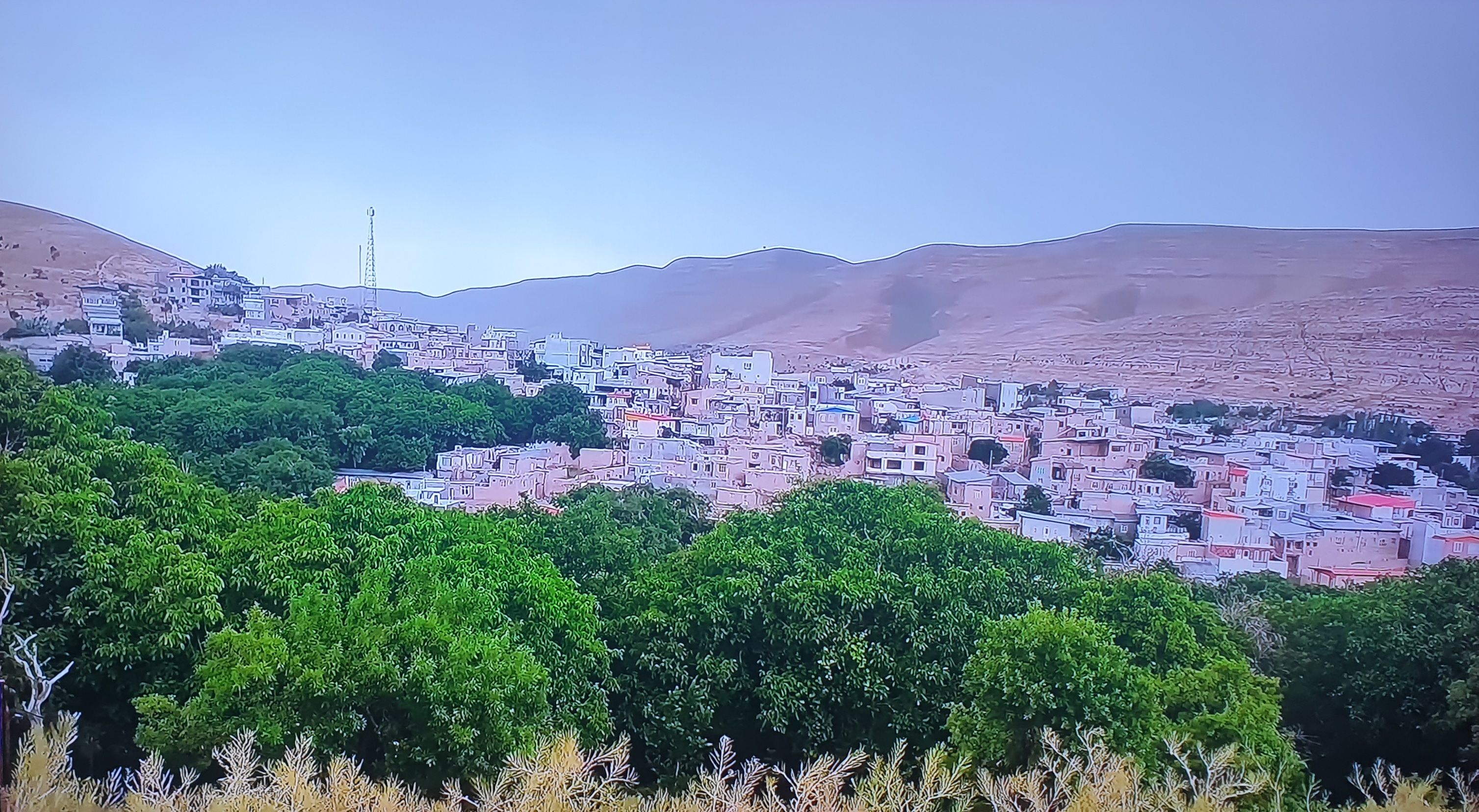
Vafs

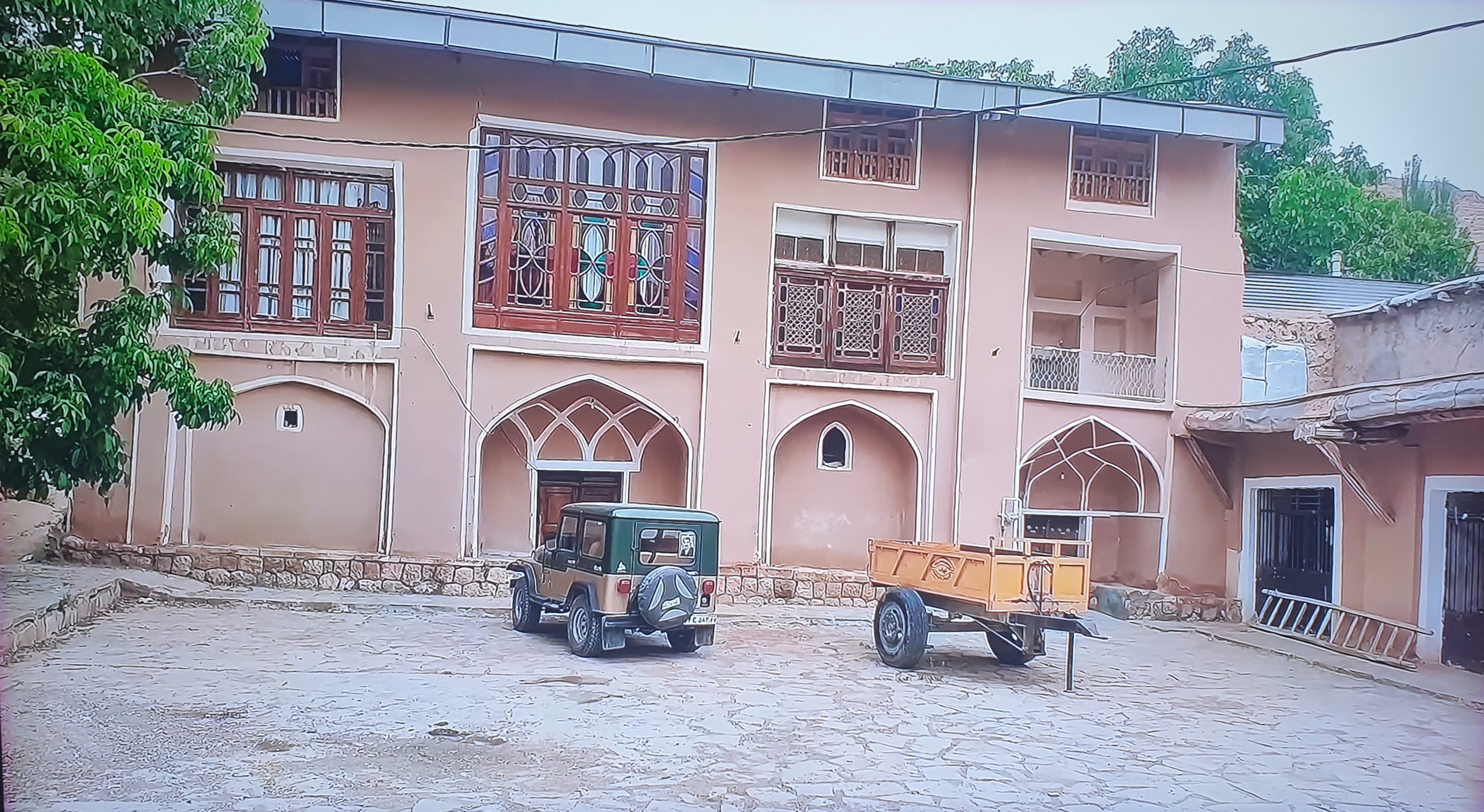
Local architecture of Marakzi area in Vafs

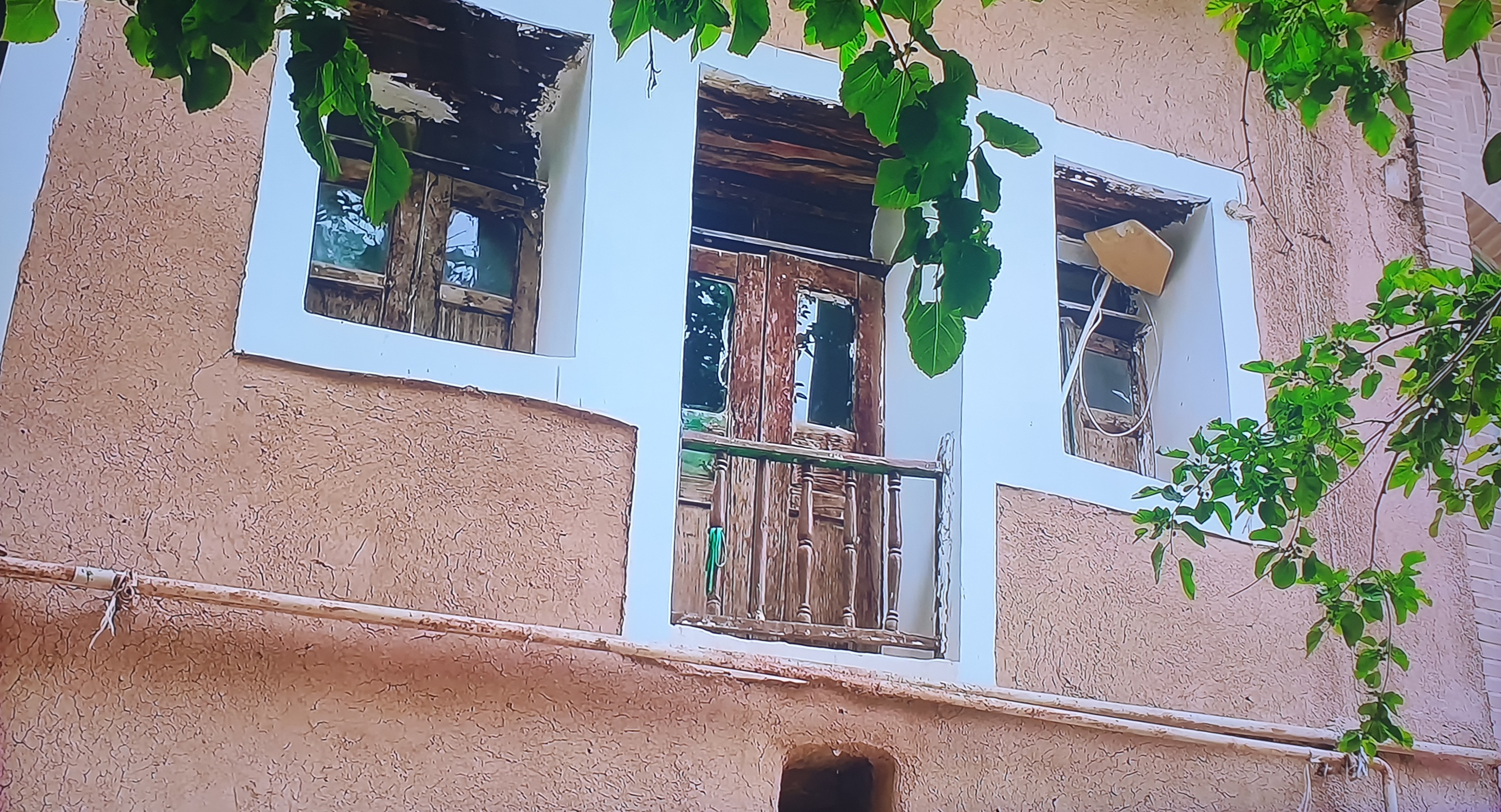
Local architecture, details, Vafs
