= Zaduqabad =

Village in Markazi province, Iran

Zaduqabad Persian: ذادوق اباد
- Village
- Location within Iran
- Coordinates: 34°42′06″N 49°19′05″E
- Country: Iran
- Province: Markazi
- County: Komijan
- District: Central
- Rural District: Vafs

Population (2016)
  - Total: 75
- Time zone: UTC+3:30 (IRST)

Zaduqabad (Persian: ذادوق اباد) (Note: Also romanized as Z̄ādūqābād; also known as Jāwa, Zadagh Abad, and Z̄ādeqābād) is a village in Vafs Rural District of the Central District in Komijan County, Markazi province, Iran.

== Demographics ==
=== Population ===
At the time of the 2006 National Census, the village's population was 72 in 21 households, when it was in Esfandan Rural District. The following census in 2011 counted 84 people in 26 households, by which time Zaduqabad had been transferred to Vafs Rural District created in the same district. The 2016 census measured the population of the village as 75 people in 26 households.
