= Takyeh, Komijan =

Village in Markazi province, Iran

Takyeh Persian: تكيه
- Village
- Location within Iran
- Coordinates: 34°46′21″N 49°21′04″E
- Country: Iran
- Province: Markazi
- County: Komijan
- District: Central
- Rural District: Vafs

Population (2016)
  - Total: 59
- Time zone: UTC+3:30 (IRST)

Takyeh (Persian: تكيه) (Note: Also romanized as Tekyeh; also known as Takia) is a village in Vafs Rural District of the Central District in Komijan County, Markazi province, Iran.

== Demographics ==
=== Population ===
At the time of the 2006 National Census, the village's population was 59 in 19 households, when it was in Esfandan Rural District. The following census in 2011 counted 55 people in 18 households, by which time Takyeh had been transferred to Vafs Rural District created in the same district. The 2016 census measured the population of the village as 59 people in 21 households.
