= Fathabad, Komijan =

Village in Markazi province, Iran

Fathabad Persian: فتح اباد
- Village
- Location within Iran
- Coordinates: 34°43′17″N 49°21′54″E
- Country: Iran
- Province: Markazi
- County: Komijan
- District: Central
- Rural District: Vafs

Population (2016)
  - Total: 314
- Time zone: UTC+3:30 (IRST)

Fathabad (Persian: فتح اباد) (Note: Also romanized as Fatḩābād) is a village in Vafs Rural District of the Central District in Komijan County, Markazi province, Iran.

== Demographics ==
=== Population ===
At the time of the 2006 National Census, the village's population was 440 in 119 households, when it was in Esfandan Rural District. The following census in 2011 counted 429 people in 126 households, by which time Fathabad had been transferred to Vafs Rural District created in the same district. The 2016 census measured the population of the village as 314 people in 106 households.
