= Khomar Baghi =

Village in Markazi province, Iran

Khomar Baghi Persian: خمارباغي
- Village
- Location within Iran
- Coordinates: 34°40′39″N 49°20′39″E
- Country: Iran
- Province: Markazi
- County: Komijan
- District: Central
- Rural District: Vafs

Population (2016)
  - Total: 859
- Time zone: UTC+3:30 (IRST)

Khomar Baghi (Persian: خمارباغي) (Note: Also romanized as Khomār Bāghī; also known as Khasār Bāghī, Khomār Bāqi, and Khomār Bāqī) is a village in Vafs Rural District of the Central District in Komijan County, Markazi province, Iran.

== Demographics ==
=== Population ===
At the time of the 2006 National Census, the village's population was 872 in 215 households, when it was in Esfandan Rural District. The following census in 2011 counted 889 people in 258 households, by which time Khomar Baghi had been transferred to Vafs Rural District created in the same district. The 2016 census measured the population of the village as 859 people in 279 households.
