= Esfandan =

Esfandan or Isfandan (Persian: اسفندان) may refer to:

- Esfandan, Isfahan
- Esfandan, Kerman
- Esfandan, Kohgiluyeh and Boyer-Ahmad
- Esfandan, Markazi
- Esfandan, Mazandaran
- Esfandan Rural District, in Markazi Province
