= Nahr-e Poshteh =

Village in Markazi province, Iran

Nahr-e Poshteh Persian: نهرپشته
- Village
- Location within Iran
- Coordinates: 34°39′30″N 49°10′20″E
- Country: Iran
- Province: Markazi
- County: Komijan
- District: Milajerd
- Rural District: Milajerd

Population (2016)
  - Total: 208
- Time zone: UTC+3:30 (IRST)

Nahr-e Poshteh (Persian: نهرپشته) (Note: Also romanized as Nahr Poshteh; also known as Nahrpushteh) is a village in Milajerd Rural District of Milajerd District, Komijan County in Markazi province, Iran.

== Demographics ==
=== Population ===
At the time of the 2006 National Census, the village's population was 299 in 72 households. The following census in 2011 counted 295 people in 67 households. The 2016 census measured the population of the village as 208 people in 61 households.
