= Seyjan, Markazi =

Village in Markazi province, Iran

Seyjan Persian: سيجان
- Village
- Location within Iran
- Coordinates: 34°48′34″N 49°10′38″E
- Country: Iran
- Province: Markazi
- County: Komijan
- District: Milajerd
- Rural District: Khosrow Beyk

Population (2016)
  - Total: 127
- Time zone: UTC+3:30 (IRST)

Seyjan (Persian: سيجان) (Note: Also romanized as Seyjān; also known as Sīchān) is a village in Khosrow Beyk Rural District of Milajerd District in Komijan County, Markazi province, Iran.

== Demographics ==
=== Population ===
At the time of the 2006 National Census, the village's population was 208 in 56 households. The following census in 2011 counted 177 people in 53 households. The 2016 census measured the population of the village as 127 people in 41 households.
