= Meydanak, Markazi =

Village in Markazi province, Iran

Meydanak Persian: ميدانك
- Village
- Location within Iran
- Coordinates: 34°48′17″N 49°27′06″E
- Country: Iran
- Province: Markazi
- County: Komijan
- District: Central
- Rural District: Vafs

Population (2016)
  - Total: 212
- Time zone: UTC+3:30 (IRST)

Meydanak (Persian: ميدانك) (Note: Also romanized as Meydānak) is a village in Vafs Rural District of the Central District in Komijan County, Markazi province, Iran.

== Demographics ==
=== Population ===
At the time of the 2006 National Census, the village's population was 361 in 85 households, when it was in Khenejin Rural District. The following census in 2011 counted 325 people in 99 households, by which time the rural district had been separated from the county in the establishment of Farahan County. Meydanak was transferred to Vafs Rural District created in the Central District. The 2016 census measured the population of the village as 212 people in 72 households.
