= Kheyrabad, Komijan =

Village in Markazi province, Iran

Kheyrabad Persian: خيراباد
- Village
- Location within Iran
- Coordinates: 34°42′57″N 49°10′02″E
- Country: Iran
- Province: Markazi
- County: Komijan
- District: Milajerd
- Rural District: Khosrow Beyk

Population (2016)
  - Total: 15
- Time zone: UTC+3:30 (IRST)

Kheyrabad (Persian: خيراباد) (Note: Also romanized as Kheyrābād) is a village in Khosrow Beyk Rural District of Milajerd District in Komijan County, Markazi province, Iran.

== Demographics ==
=== Population ===
At the time of the 2006 National Census, the village's population was 63 in 14 households. The following census in 2011 counted 21 people in five households. The 2016 census measured the population of the village as 15 people in four households.
