= Mehdiabad, Komijan =

Village in Markazi province, Iran

Mehdiabad Persian: مهدي اباد
- Village
- Location within Iran
- Country: Iran
- Province: Markazi
- County: Komijan
- District: Milajerd
- Rural District: Milajerd

Population (2016)
  - Total: 108
- Time zone: UTC+3:30 (IRST)

Mehdiabad (Persian: مهدي اباد) (Note: Also romanized as Mahdīābād and Mehdīābād) is a village in Milajerd Rural District of Milajerd District, Komijan County in Markazi province, Iran.

== Demographics ==
=== Population ===
At the time of the 2006 National Census, the village's population was 172 in 40 households. The following census in 2011 counted 150 people in 37 households. The 2016 census measured the population of the village as 108 people in 33 households.
