= Asemabad =

Village in Markazi province, Iran

Asemabad Persian: عاصم اباد
- Village
- Location within Iran
- Coordinates: 34°42′31″N 49°07′58″E
- Country: Iran
- Province: Markazi
- County: Komijan
- District: Milajerd
- Rural District: Khosrow Beyk

Population (2016)
  - Total: 0
- Time zone: UTC+3:30 (IRST)

Asemabad (Persian: عاصم اباد) (Note: Also romanized as Āşemābād, Asemābād, and Āsemābād) is a village in Khosrow Beyk Rural District of Milajerd District in Komijan County, Markazi province, Iran.

== Demographics ==
=== Population ===
At the time of the 2006 National Census, the village's population was nine in seven households. The 2016 census measured the population of the village as zero.
