= Aqcheh Kahriz =

Village in Markazi province, Iran

Aqcheh Kahriz Persian: اقچه كهريز
- Village
- Location within Iran
- Coordinates: 34°41′11″N 49°15′32″E
- Country: Iran
- Province: Markazi
- County: Komijan
- District: Milajerd
- Rural District: Milajerd

Population (2016)
  - Total: 39
- Time zone: UTC+3:30 (IRST)

Aqcheh Kahriz (Persian: اقچه كهريز) (Note: Also romanized as Āqcheh Kahrīz; also known as Āqjeh Kahrīz) is a village in Milajerd Rural District of Milajerd District, Komijan County in Markazi province, Iran.

== Demographics ==
=== Population ===
At the time of the 2006 National Census, the village's population was 56 in 12 households. The following census in 2011 counted 45 people in 11 households. The 2016 census measured the population of the village as 39 people in 12 households.
