= Hoseynabad, Komijan =

Village in Markazi province, Iran

Hoseynabad Persian: حسين اباد
- Village
- Location within Iran
- Coordinates: 34°33′17″N 49°09′52″E
- Country: Iran
- Province: Markazi
- County: Komijan
- District: Milajerd
- Rural District: Milajerd

Population (2016)
  - Total: 372
- Time zone: UTC+3:30 (IRST)

Hoseynabad (Persian: حسين اباد) (Note: Also romanized as Hoseyn Ābād and Ḩoseynābād; formerly known as Ḩoseynābād Shokrā’ī and Ḩoseynābād-e Shokrā’ī; also known as Husainābād) is a village in Milajerd Rural District of Milajerd District, Komijan County in Markazi province, Iran.

== Demographics ==
=== Population ===
At the time of the 2006 National Census, the village's population was 573 in 143 households. The following census in 2011 counted 533 people in 156 households. The 2016 census measured the population of the village as 372 people in 128 households.
