= Susanabad =

Susanabad (Persian: سوسن اباد) may refer to:

- Susanabad, Arak, Markazi Province
- Susanabad, Komijan, Markazi Province
- Susanabad, Salmas, West Azerbaijan Province
- Susanabad, Urmia, West Azerbaijan Province
