= Mahmudabad, Komijan =

Village in Markazi province, Iran

Mahmudabad Persian: محموداباد
- Village
- Location within Iran
- Coordinates: 34°44′09″N 49°08′40″E
- Country: Iran
- Province: Markazi
- County: Komijan
- District: Milajerd
- Rural District: Khosrow Beyk

Population (2016)
  - Total: 587
- Time zone: UTC+3:30 (IRST)

Mahmudabad (Persian: محموداباد) (Note: Also romanized as Maḩmūdābād) is a village in Khosrow Beyk Rural District of Milajerd District in Komijan County, Markazi province, Iran.

== Demographics ==
=== Population ===
At the time of the 2006 National Census, the village's population was 620 in 154 households. The following census in 2011 counted 612 people in 165 households. The 2016 census measured the population of the village as 587 people in 169 households.
