= Yasavol, Markazi =

Village in Markazi province, Iran

Yasavol Persian: يساول
- Village
- Location within Iran
- Coordinates: 34°30′41″N 49°21′57″E
- Country: Iran
- Province: Markazi
- County: Komijan
- District: Central
- Rural District: Esfandan

Population (2016)
  - Total: 288
- Time zone: UTC+3:30 (IRST)

Yasavol (Persian: يساول) (Note: Also romanized as Yasāvol; also known as Yesgūl) is a village in Esfandan Rural District of the Central District in Komijan County, Markazi province, Iran.

== Demographics ==
=== Population ===
At the time of the 2006 National Census, the village's population was 386 in 103 households. The following census in 2011 counted 365 people in 103 households. The 2016 census measured the population of the village as 288 people in 97 households.

=== Language ===
Azerbaijanis are the only ethnic group in the village , they speak Azerbaijani
