= Rowshanai =

Village in Markazi province, Iran

Rowshanai Persian: روشنايي
- Village
- Location within Iran
- Coordinates: 34°42′40″N 49°27′17″E
- Country: Iran
- Province: Markazi
- County: Komijan
- District: Central
- Rural District: Vafs

Population (2016)
  - Total: 273
- Time zone: UTC+3:30 (IRST)

Rowshanai (Persian: روشنايي) (Note: Also romanized as Rowshanā'ī) is a village in Vafs Rural District of the Central District in Komijan County, Markazi province, Iran.

== Demographics ==
=== Population ===
At the time of the 2006 National Census, the village's population was 287 in 69 households, when it was in Khenejin Rural District. The following census in 2011 counted 272 people in 65 households, by which time the rural district had been separated from the county in the establishment of Farahan County. Rowshanai was transferred to Vafs Rural District created in the Central District. The 2016 census measured the population of the village as 273 people in 76 households.
