= Farak =

Farak or Fark or Fork (Persian: فرك) may refer to:

- Farak, Komijan, Markazi Province
- Farak, Tafresh, Markazi Province
- Fark, Razavi Khorasan
- Fark, Yazd

== See also ==
- Farg (disambiguation)
- FARK (disambiguation)
