= Parkak =

Village in Markazi province, Iran

Parkak Persian: پركك
- Village
- Location within Iran
- Coordinates: 34°34′28″N 49°16′47″E
- Country: Iran
- Province: Markazi
- County: Komijan
- District: Milajerd
- Rural District: Milajerd

Population (2016)
  - Total: 25
- Time zone: UTC+3:30 (IRST)

Parkak (Persian: پركك) (Note: Also known as Parkag) is a village in Milajerd Rural District of Milajerd District, Komijan County in Markazi province, Iran.

== Demographics ==
=== Population ===
At the time of the 2006 National Census, the village's population was 26 in five households. The following census in 2011 counted 21 people in five households. The 2016 census measured the population of the village as 25 people in eight households.
