= Emamzadeh Abbas, Markazi =

Village in Markazi province, Iran

Emamzadeh Abbas Persian: امامزاده عباس
- Village
- Location within Iran
- Coordinates: 34°33′58″N 49°12′49″E
- Country: Iran
- Province: Markazi
- County: Komijan
- District: Milajerd
- Rural District: Milajerd

Population (2016)
  - Total: 755
- Time zone: UTC+3:30 (IRST)

Emamzadeh Abbas (Persian: امامزاده عباس) (Note: Also romanized as Emāmzādeh ‘Abbās and Imāmzādeh ‘Abbās) is a village in Milajerd Rural District of Milajerd District, Komijan County in Markazi province, Iran.

== Demographics ==
=== Population ===
At the time of the 2006 National Census, the village's population was 999 in 224 households. The following census in 2011 counted 905 people in 229 households. The 2016 census measured the population of the village as 755 people in 228 households, the most populous in its rural district.
