= Famarin =

Village in Markazi province, Iran

Famarin Persian: فامرين
- Village
- Location within Iran
- Coordinates: 34°40′14″N 49°15′28″E
- Country: Iran
- Province: Markazi
- County: Komijan
- District: Milajerd
- Rural District: Milajerd

Population (2016)
  - Total: 538
- Time zone: UTC+3:30 (IRST)

Famarin (Persian: فامرين) (Note: Also romanized as Famārīn, Fāmarīn, and Fāmerīn) is a village in Milajerd Rural District of Milajerd District, Komijan County in Markazi province, Iran.

== Demographics ==
=== Population ===
At the time of the 2006 National Census, the village's population was 690 in 173 households. The following census in 2011 counted 646 people in 186 households. The 2016 census measured the population of the village as 538 people in 181 households.
