= Kalvan, Markazi =

Village in Markazi province, Iran

Kalvan Persian: كلوان
- Village
- Location within Iran
- Coordinates: 34°39′14″N 49°21′14″E
- Country: Iran
- Province: Markazi
- County: Komijan
- District: Central
- Rural District: Esfandan

Population (2016)
  - Total: 721
- Time zone: UTC+3:30 (IRST)

Kalvan (Persian: كلوان) (Note: Also romanized as Kalvān; also known as Khālwān) is a village in Esfandan Rural District of the Central District in Komijan County, Markazi province, Iran.

== Demographics ==
=== Population ===
At the time of the 2006 National Census, the village's population was 847 in 193 households. The following census in 2011 counted 817 people in 226 households. The 2016 census measured the population of the village as 721 people in 219 households.
