= Validabad =

Validabad or Walidabad (Persian: وليداباد) may refer to:

- Validabad, Fars
- Validabad, Markazi
