= Khatamabad, Markazi =

Village in Markazi province, Iran

Khatamabad Persian: خاتم اباد
- Village
- Location within Iran
- Coordinates: 34°36′42″N 49°17′29″E
- Country: Iran
- Province: Markazi
- County: Komijan
- District: Milajerd
- Rural District: Milajerd

Population (2016)
  - Total: 203
- Time zone: UTC+3:30 (IRST)

Khatamabad (Persian: خاتم اباد) (Note: Also romanized as Khātamābād; formerly known as Khānābād; also known as Emāmzādeh ‘Abdollāh and Khānehābād) is a village in Milajerd Rural District of Milajerd District, Komijan County in Markazi province, Iran.

== Demographics ==
=== Population ===
At the time of the 2006 National Census, the village's population was 230 in 61 households. The following census in 2011 counted 244 people in 69 households. The 2016 census measured the population of the village as 203 people in 67 households.
