= Aliabad, Komijan =

Village in Markazi province, Iran

Aliabad Persian: علي اباد
- Village
- Location within Iran
- Coordinates: 34°42′03″N 49°13′44″E
- Country: Iran
- Province: Markazi
- County: Komijan
- District: Milajerd
- Rural District: Khosrow Beyk

Population (2016)
  - Total: 67
- Time zone: UTC+3:30 (IRST)

Aliabad (Persian: علی‌آباد) (Note: Also romanized as ‘Alīābād) is a village in Khosrow Beyk Rural District of Milajerd District in Komijan County, Markazi province, Iran.

== Demographics ==
=== Population ===
At the time of the 2006 National Census, the village's population was 107 in 27 households. The following census in 2011 counted 115 people in 32 households. The 2016 census measured the population of the village as 67 people in 22 households.
