= Darreh Sabz =

Village in Markazi province, Iran

Darreh Sabz Persian: دره سبز
- Village
- Location within Iran
- Coordinates: 34°33′23″N 49°22′11″E
- Country: Iran
- Province: Markazi
- County: Komijan
- District: Central
- Rural District: Esfandan

Population (2016)
  - Total: 117
- Time zone: UTC+3:30 (IRST)

Darreh Sabz (Persian: دره سبز) (Note: Formerly known as Darreh Gorg or Darreh-ye Gorg; also known as Darreh Gurg) is a village in Esfandan Rural District of the Central District in Komijan County, Markazi province, Iran.

== Demographics ==
=== Population ===
At the time of the 2006 National Census, the village's population was 149 in 42 households. The following census in 2011 counted 126 people in 40 households. The 2016 census measured the population of the village as 117 people in 37 households.
