= Ud Aghaj =

Village in Markazi province, Iran

Ud Aghaj Persian: عوداغاج
- Village
- Location within Iran
- Coordinates: 34°47′21″N 49°25′56″E
- Country: Iran
- Province: Markazi
- County: Komijan
- District: Central
- Rural District: Vafs

Population (2016)
  - Total: 77
- Time zone: UTC+3:30 (IRST)

Ud Aghaj (Persian: عوداغاج) (Note: Also romanized as ‘Ūd Āghāj; also known as Adāghāj and Odāghāj) is a village in Vafs Rural District of the Central District in Komijan County, Markazi province, Iran.

== Demographics ==
=== Population ===
At the time of the 2006 National Census, the village's population was 69 in 14 households, when it was in Khenejin Rural District. The following census in 2011 counted 63 people in 15 households, by which time the rural district had been separated from the county in the establishment of Farahan County. Ud Aghaj was transferred to Vafs Rural District created in the Central District. The 2016 census measured the population of the village as 77 people in 27 households.
