= Rastgordan =

Village in Markazi province, Iran

Rastgordan Persian: راستگردان
- Village
- Location within Iran
- Coordinates: 34°38′51″N 49°25′11″E
- Country: Iran
- Province: Markazi
- County: Komijan
- District: Central
- Rural District: Esfandan

Population (2016)
  - Total: 100
- Time zone: UTC+3:30 (IRST)

Rastgordan (Persian: راستگردان) (Note: Also romanized as Rāstgordān; also known as Rāst Kordān) is a village in Esfandan Rural District of the Central District in Komijan County, Markazi province, Iran.

== Demographics ==
=== Population ===
At the time of the 2006 National Census, the village's population was 116 in 28 households. The following census in 2011 counted 106 people in 32 households. The 2016 census measured the population of the village as 100 people in 33 households.
