= Fork (disambiguation) =

A fork is a utensil for eating and cooking.

Fork may also refer to:

== Implements ==
- Fork (road), a type of intersection where a road splits
- Bicycle fork, the part of a bicycle to which the front wheel is attached
- Garden fork, a pronged gardening tool designed for digging
- Military fork, a pole weapon used between the 15th and 19th centuries
- Motorcycle fork, the portion of a motorcycle that holds the front wheel
- Pitchfork, a tined farming tool used to lift and pitch hay and perform other tasks
- Tuning fork, a vibrating device used to tune musical instruments
- Winnowing fork, a tined farming tool used to separate grain and chaff

== Places ==
- Fork, Iran (disambiguation), several places in Iran
- Fork, Maryland, United States, a town
- Fork Township (disambiguation), several districts in the United States

== Computing ==
- Fork (file system), a part of a file in certain filesystems
- Fork (software development), when a piece of software or other work is split into two branches or variations of development
- fork (system call), the method whereby a running process creates a new process
- Fork (blockchain), a split of the blockchain into two chains or a protocol change
- The Fork, an on-line restaurant booking system

== Other uses ==
- Fork (chess), a situation in chess where one piece simultaneously attacks two or more opposing pieces
- Operation Fork, the invasion of Iceland by the British during World War II
- Fork, in the United States a tributary of a river or other stream

== See also ==
- Forks (disambiguation)
- The Forks (disambiguation)
- Forq
- Furca (disambiguation) ("fork" in Latin)
