= Yengi Molk =

Village in Markazi province, Iran

Yengi Molk Persian: ينگه ملك
- Village
- Location within Iran
- Coordinates: 34°42′52″N 49°14′48″E
- Country: Iran
- Province: Markazi
- County: Komijan
- District: Milajerd
- Rural District: Khosrow Beyk

Population (2016)
  - Total: 409
- Time zone: UTC+3:30 (IRST)

Yengi Molk (Persian: ينگه ملك) (Note: Also romanized as Yangī Molk, Yengī Molk, and Yengīmelk; also known as Ingemulk and Yengeh Molk) is a village in Khosrow Beyk Rural District of Milajerd District in Komijan County, Markazi province, Iran.

== Demographics ==
=== Population ===
At the time of the 2006 National Census, the village's population was 545 in 118 households. The following census in 2011 counted 477 people in 126 households. The 2016 census measured the population of the village as 409 people in 125 households.
