= Chal Mian =

Village in Markazi province, Iran

Chal Mian Persian: چالميان
- Village
- Location within Iran
- Coordinates: 34°51′53″N 49°28′07″E
- Country: Iran
- Province: Markazi
- County: Komijan
- District: Central
- Rural District: Vafs

Population (2016)
  - Total: 99
- Time zone: UTC+3:30 (IRST)

Chal Mian (Persian: چالميان) (Note: Also romanized as Chāl Meyān and Chāl Mīān) is a village in Vafs Rural District of the Central District in Komijan County, Markazi province, Iran.

== Demographics ==
=== Population ===
At the time of the 2006 National Census, the village's population was 189 in 46 households, when it was in Khenejin Rural District. The following census in 2011 counted 165 people in 41 households, by which time the rural district had been separated from the county in the establishment of Farahan County. Chal Mian was transferred to Vafs Rural District created in the Central District. The 2016 census measured the population of the village as 99 people in 28 households.
