= Sabzabad, Markazi =

Village in Markazi province, Iran

Sabzabad Persian: سبزاباد
- Village
- Location within Iran
- Coordinates: 34°40′41″N 49°11′33″E
- Country: Iran
- Province: Markazi
- County: Komijan
- District: Milajerd
- Rural District: Khosrow Beyk

Population (2016)
  - Total: 90
- Time zone: UTC+3:30 (IRST)

Sabzabad (Persian: سبزاباد) (Note: Also romanized as Sabzābād) is a village in Khosrow Beyk Rural District of Milajerd District in Komijan County, Markazi province, Iran.

== Demographics ==
=== Population ===
At the time of the 2006 National Census, the village's population was 84 in 19 households. The following census in 2011 counted 89 people in 22 households. The 2016 census measured the population of the village as 90 people in 28 households.
