= Yasbolagh =

Village in Markazi province, Iran

Yasbolagh Persian: ياسبلاغ
- Village
- Location within Iran
- Coordinates: 34°32′39″N 49°17′57″E
- Country: Iran
- Province: Markazi
- County: Komijan
- District: Central
- Rural District: Esfandan

Population (2016)
  - Total: 592
- Time zone: UTC+3:30 (IRST)

Yasbolagh (Persian: ياسبلاغ) (Note: Also romanized as Yāsbolāgh; also known as Ās Būlāq) is a village in Esfandan Rural District of the Central District in Komijan County, Markazi province, Iran.

== Demographics ==
=== Population ===
At the time of the 2006 National Census, the village's population was 903 in 220 households. The following census in 2011 counted 737 people in 205 households. The 2016 census measured the population of the village as 592 people in 191 households.
