= Kutabad =

Village in Markazi province, Iran

Kutabad Persian: كوت آباد
- Village
- Location within Iran
- Coordinates: 34°36′14″N 49°23′35″E
- Country: Iran
- Province: Markazi
- County: Komijan
- District: Central
- Rural District: Esfandan

Population (2016)
  - Total: 288
- Time zone: UTC+3:30 (IRST)

Kutabad (Persian: كوت آباد) (Note: Also romanized as Kūtābād) is a village in Esfandan Rural District of the Central District in Komijan County, Markazi province, Iran.

== Demographics ==
=== Population ===
At the time of the 2006 National Census, the village's population was 357 in 82 households. The following census in 2011 counted 349 people in 83 households. The 2016 census measured the population of the village as 288 people in 82 households.
