= Sardarabad, Markazi =

Village in Markazi province, Iran

Sardarabad Persian: سردراباد
- Village
- Location within Iran
- Coordinates: 34°40′51″N 49°13′16″E
- Country: Iran
- Province: Markazi
- County: Komijan
- District: Milajerd
- Rural District: Khosrow Beyk

Population (2016)
  - Total: 22
- Time zone: UTC+3:30 (IRST)

Sardarabad (Persian: سردراباد) (Note: Also romanized as Sardārābād and Sardarābād; also known as Sarvarābād) is a village in Khosrow Beyk Rural District of Milajerd District in Komijan County, Markazi province, Iran.

== Demographics ==
=== Population ===
At the time of the 2006 National Census, the village's population was 27 in nine households. The following census in 2011 counted 26 people in six households. The 2016 census measured the population of the village as 22 people in five households.
