= Suran, Markazi =

Village in Markazi province, Iran

Suran Persian: سوران
- Village
- Location within Iran
- Coordinates: 34°43′48″N 49°08′30″E
- Country: Iran
- Province: Markazi
- County: Komijan
- District: Milajerd
- Rural District: Khosrow Beyk

Population (2016)
  - Total: 416
- Time zone: UTC+3:30 (IRST)

Suran (Persian: سوران) (Note: Also romanized as Sūrān; also known as Manşūrān) is a village in Khosrow Beyk Rural District of Milajerd District in Komijan County, Markazi province, Iran.

== Demographics ==
=== Population ===
At the time of the 2006 National Census, the village's population was 385 in 87 households. The following census in 2011 counted 416 people in 111 households. The 2016 census measured the population of the village as 416 people in 99 households.
