= Khosrow Beyg =

Village in Markazi province, Iran

Khosrow Beyg Persian: خسروبيگ
- Village
- Location within Iran
- Coordinates: 34°41′44″N 49°11′07″E
- Country: Iran
- Province: Markazi
- County: Komijan
- District: Milajerd
- Rural District: Khosrow Beyk

Population (2016)
  - Total: 1,604
- Time zone: UTC+3:30 (IRST)

Khosrow Beyg (Persian: خسروبيگ) (Note: Also known as Khosrow Bak, Khosrowbag, and Khusrowi) is a village in, and the capital of, Khosrow Beyk Rural District in Milajerd District of Komijan County, Markazi province, Iran.

== Demographics ==
=== Population ===
At the time of the 2006 National Census, the village's population was 1,914 in 468 households. The following census in 2011 counted 1,884 people in 538 households. The 2016 census measured the population of the village as 1,604 people in 488 households, the most populous in its rural district.
