= Samqavor =

Village in Markazi province, Iran

Samqavor Persian: سمقاور
- Village
- Location within Iran
- Coordinates: 34°44′22″N 49°24′52″E
- Country: Iran
- Province: Markazi
- County: Komijan
- District: Central
- Rural District: Vafs

Population (2016)
  - Total: 2,107
- Time zone: UTC+3:30 (IRST)

Samqavor (Persian: سمقاور) (Note: Also romanized as Samqāvar and Samqāvor; also known as Şam‘ Āvar, Şamghāvar, and Shūm Qāwar) is a village in Vafs Rural District of the Central District in Komijan County, Markazi province, Iran.

== Demographics ==
=== Population ===
At the time of the 2006 National Census, the village's population was 1,919 in 548 households, when it was in Khenejin Rural District. The following census in 2011 counted 2,086 people in 637 households, by which time the rural district had been separated from the county in the establishment of Farahan County. Samqavor was transferred to Vafs Rural District created in the Central District. The 2016 census measured the population of the village as 2,107 people in 684 households, the most populous in its rural district.
