= Milajerd Castle =

Castle in Markazi Province, Iran

Milajerd castle
- قلعه میلاجرد
- Interactive map of the Milajerd castle area

General information
- Type: Castle
- Location: Komijan County, Iran

Milajerd castle (Persian: قلعه میلاجرد) is a historical castle located in Komijan County in Markazi Province. The history of the fortress dates back to the periods after Islam.
