= Chalbi, Markazi =

Village in Markazi province, Iran

Chalbi Persian: چلبي
- Village
- Location within Iran
- Coordinates: 34°36′21″N 49°19′50″E
- Country: Iran
- Province: Markazi
- County: Komijan
- District: Central
- Rural District: Esfandan

Population (2016)
  - Total: 918
- Time zone: UTC+3:30 (IRST)

Chalbi (Persian: چلبي) (Note: Also romanized as Chalabī and Chalbī; also known as Kalābi) is a village in Esfandan Rural District of the Central District in Komijan County, Markazi province, Iran.

== Demographics ==
=== Population ===
At the time of the 2006 National Census, the village's population was 1,082 in 265 households. The following census in 2011 counted 1,035 people in 305 households. The 2016 census measured the population of the village as 918 people in 309 households.
