= Tarlan =

Tarlan (Persian: ترلان, Azerbaijani: Tərlan) may refer to:

== Geography ==
- Tarlan, Arak county, in Iran
- Tarlan, Komijan county, in Iran

== People with the given name Tarlan ==
- Tarlan Ahmadov (born 1971), Azerbaijani footballer
- Tarlan Karimov (born 1986), Azerbaijani judoka
- Tarlan Rafiee (born 1980), Iranian visual artist and curator
