= Farg =

Farg may refer to:

- Farg, Kashmar, a village in Iran
- Farg, Markazi, a village in Iran
- River Farg, a small river in central Scotland
- Glen Farg small village and reservoir in Central Scotland

== See also ==
- Fargo (disambiguation)
- Farge
