= Susanabad, Komijan =

Village in Markazi province, Iran

Susanabad Persian: سوسن اباد
- Village
- Location within Iran
- Coordinates: 34°31′12″N 49°24′05″E
- Country: Iran
- Province: Markazi
- County: Komijan
- District: Central
- Rural District: Esfandan

Population (2016)
  - Total: 32
- Time zone: UTC+3:30 (IRST)

Susanabad (Persian: سوسن اباد) (Note: Also romanized as Sūsanābād) is a village in Esfandan Rural District of the Central District in Komijan County, Markazi province, Iran.

== Demographics ==
=== Population ===
At the time of the 2006 National Census, the village's population was 56 in 16 households. The following census in 2011 counted 43 people in 13 households. The 2016 census measured the population of the village as 32 people in 11 households.
