= The Forks =

The Forks may refer to:

== Places ==
=== Canada ===
- The Forks, Winnipeg, Manitoba, a district around the confluence of the Red River of the North and Assiniboine River
- Saskatchewan River Forks, where the North Saskatchewan and South Saskatchewan rivers combine to form the Saskatchewan River

=== United States ===
- The Forks, California, unincorporated community in Mendocino County
- The Forks, Kentucky
- The Forks, Maine, a small community
- The Forks, a common nickname given to Greater Grand Forks, the cities of Grand Forks, North Dakota and East Grand Forks, Minnesota
- "The Forks", the original settlement which preceded Burlington, North Dakota, near the confluence of the Des Lacs River and the Mouse River

== Other uses ==
- "The forks", referring in Australian English to the "V sign", which may be used as an insulting or obscene gesture

== See also ==
- The Fork, an online restaurants booking system
- Forks (disambiguation)
- Fork (disambiguation)
