= Tarlan, Komijan =

Village in Markazi province, Iran

Tarlan Persian: طرلان
- Village
- Location within Iran
- Coordinates: 34°49′43″N 49°11′43″E
- Country: Iran
- Province: Markazi
- County: Komijan
- District: Milajerd
- Rural District: Khosrow Beyk

Population (2016)
  - Total: 121
- Time zone: UTC+3:30 (IRST)

Tarlan (Persian: طرلان) (Note: Also romanized as Ţarlān; also known as Ţarlā) is a village in Khosrow Beyk Rural District of Milajerd District in Komijan County, Markazi province, Iran.

== Demographics ==
=== Population ===
At the time of the 2006 National Census, the village's population was 181 in 59 households. The following census in 2011 counted 145 people in 59 households. The 2016 census measured the population of the village as 121 people in 46 households.
