= Soluklu =

Soluklu or Solook Loo or Solu Kalu (Persian: سلوكلو) may refer to:

- Soluklu, Ardabil
- Soluklu, Markazi
- Soluklu, West Azerbaijan
