= Khandan Bahadori Castle =

Castle in Markazi Province, Iran

Khandan Bahadori castle
- قلعه خاندان بهادری

General information
- Type: Castle
- Location: Komijan County, Iran

Khandan Bahadori castle (Persian: قلعه خاندان بهادری) is a historical castle located in Komijan County in Markazi Province, The longevity of this fortress dates back to the Qajar dynasty.
