= Fourka (disambiguation) =

Fourka is a municipal unit in the Ioannina regional unit.

Fourka may also refer to the following places in Greece:

- Fourka, Chalkidiki, a village in Chalkidiki

== See also ==
- Furca (disambiguation)
- John T. Fourkas, 1997 recipient of the Beckman Young Investigators Award
