= Validabad, Markazi =

Village in Markazi province, Iran

Validabad Persian: وليداباد
- Village
- Location within Iran
- Coordinates: 34°46′47″N 49°09′54″E
- Country: Iran
- Province: Markazi
- County: Komijan
- District: Milajerd
- Rural District: Khosrow Beyk

Population (2016)
  - Total: 74
- Time zone: UTC+3:30 (IRST)

Validabad (Persian: وليداباد) (Note: Also romanized as Valīdābād and Walīdābād) is a village in Khosrow Beyk Rural District of Milajerd District in Komijan County, Markazi province, Iran.

== Demographics ==
=== Population ===
At the time of the 2006 National Census, the village's population was 120 in 27 households. The following census in 2011 counted 96 people in 33 households. The 2016 census measured the population of the village as 74 people in 20 households.
