= Soluklu, Markazi =

Village in Markazi province, Iran

Soluklu Persian: سلوكلو
- Village
- Location within Iran
- Coordinates: 34°35′21″N 49°15′46″E
- Country: Iran
- Province: Markazi
- County: Komijan
- District: Milajerd
- Rural District: Milajerd

Population (2016)
  - Total: 179
- Time zone: UTC+3:30 (IRST)

Soluklu (Persian: سلوكلو) (Note: Also romanized as Solook Loo, Solū Kalū, and Solūklū; also known as Sūlūklī) is a village in Milajerd Rural District of Milajerd District, Komijan County in Markazi province, Iran.

== Demographics ==
=== Population ===
At the time of the 2006 National Census, the village's population was 176 in 40 households. The following census in 2011 counted 187 people in 42 households. The 2016 census measured the population of the village as 179 people in 47 households.
