= Esfandan, Markazi =

Village in Markazi province, Iran

Esfandan Persian: اسفندان
- Village
- Location within Iran
- Coordinates: 34°37′27″N 49°20′50″E
- Country: Iran
- Province: Markazi
- County: Komijan
- District: Central
- Rural District: Esfandan

Population (2016)
  - Total: 1,188
- Time zone: UTC+3:30 (IRST)

Esfandan (Persian: اسفندان) (Note: Also romanized as Esfandān and Isfandān) is a village in, and the capital of, Esfandan Rural District in the Central District of Komijan County, Markazi province, Iran.

== Demographics ==
=== Population ===
At the time of the 2006 National Census, the village's population was 1,394 in 321 households. The following census in 2011 counted 1,171 people in 379 households. The 2016 census measured the population of the village as 1,188 people in 376 households, the most populous in its rural district.
