= Kalabi =

Kalabi (Persian: كلابي) may refer to:

- Kalabi, Hormozgan
- Kalabi, Markazi
