= Komijan Industrial Town =

Iranian industrial town

Komijan Industrial Town is located approximately 5 kilometers from the city of Komijan, Iran. It contains 92.4 hectares of industrial land area. The town is located near the main road, and is 95 kilometers away from Arak Komijan-Hmdan. It also houses the town's railway station.
