= Farak, Komijan =

Village in Markazi province, Iran

Farak Persian: فرك
- Village
- Location within Iran
- Coordinates: 34°50′33″N 49°26′19″E
- Country: Iran
- Province: Markazi
- County: Komijan
- District: Central
- Rural District: Vafs

Population (2016)
  - Total: 204
- Time zone: UTC+3:30 (IRST)

Farak (Persian: فرك) (Note: Also romanized as Fark and Fork; also known as Farg) is a village in Vafs Rural District of the Central District in Komijan County, Markazi province, Iran.

== Demographics ==
=== Language ===
The inhabitants speak Tati

=== Population ===
At the time of the 2006 National Census, the village's population was 259 in 51 households, when it was in Khenejin Rural District. The following census in 2011 counted 258 people in 64 households, by which time the rural district had been separated from the county in the establishment of Farahan County. Farak was transferred to Vafs Rural District created in the Central District. The 2016 census measured the population of the village as 204 people in 57 households.
