= FARK =

FARK or fark may refer to:

- FARK, an acronym for the Armed Forces of the Republic of Kosova (Forcat e Armatosura të Republikës së Kosovës), a guerrilla warfare group in Kosovo
- FARK, an acronym for the Royal Khmer Armed Forces (Forces armées royales khmères), the Cambodian armed forces from 1953 to 1970
- Fark, a community website of news articles compiled from various internet sites
- Fark, Iran (disambiguation), places in Iran
- F.A.R.K. a.k.a. Fast Assist Repair Kbot, a repair unit found in the 1997 video game Total Annihilation
- A euphemism for the word "fuck"

== See also ==
- Farak (disambiguation), places in Iran
- FARC, Revolutionary Armed Forces of Colombia (Fuerzas Armadas Revolucionarias de Colombia), a guerrilla warfare group
