= Milajerd Rural District =

Rural district in Markazi province, Iran

Milajerd Rural District Persian: دهستان ميلاجرد
- Rural District
- Location within Iran
- Coordinates: 34°37′N 49°13′E
- Country: Iran
- Province: Markazi
- County: Komijan
- District: Milajerd
- Established: 1987
- Capital: Milajerd

Population (2016)
  - Total: 2,427
- Time zone: UTC+3:30 (IRST)

Milajerd Rural District (Persian: دهستان ميلاجرد) is in Milajerd District of Komijan County, Markazi province, Iran. It is administered from the city of Milajerd.

== Demographics ==
=== Population ===
At the time of the 2006 National Census, the rural district's population was 3,221 in 770 households. There were 3,026 inhabitants in 802 households at the following census of 2011. The 2016 census measured the population of the rural district as 2,427 in 765 households. The most populous of its 12 villages was Emamzadeh Abbas, with 755 people.

=== Other villages in the rural district ===
- Aqcheh Kahriz
- Famarin
- Hoseynabad
- Khatamabad
- Mehdiabad
- Nahr-e Poshteh
- Parkak
- Soluklu
