= Henry Bond Fargo =

American politician

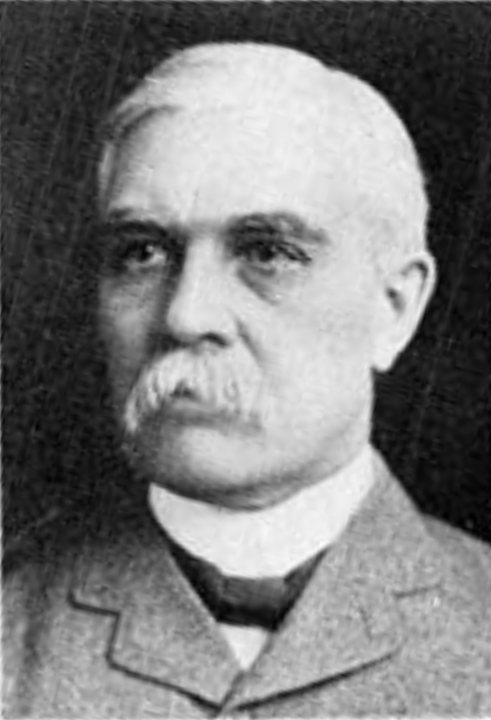

Member of the Illinois House of Representatives from the 14th district
- In office 1912 – 1914

Personal details
- Born: August 29, 1843 Warsaw, New York
- Died: December 1, 1932 (aged 89) Geneva, Illinois
- Party: Progressive
- Profession: Real estate and industry

Henry Bond Fargo (August 29, 1843 – December 1, 1932) was an American politician and businessman who spent most of his professional career in Geneva, Illinois. Born in New York, Fargo first engaged in real estate dealings in Redwood Falls, Minnesota. A Chicago real estate firm hired him in 1887, and Fargo moved to Geneva, Illinois. There, he developed local industry and served two terms as mayor. Fargo was elected to the Illinois House of Representatives in 1912.

== Biography ==
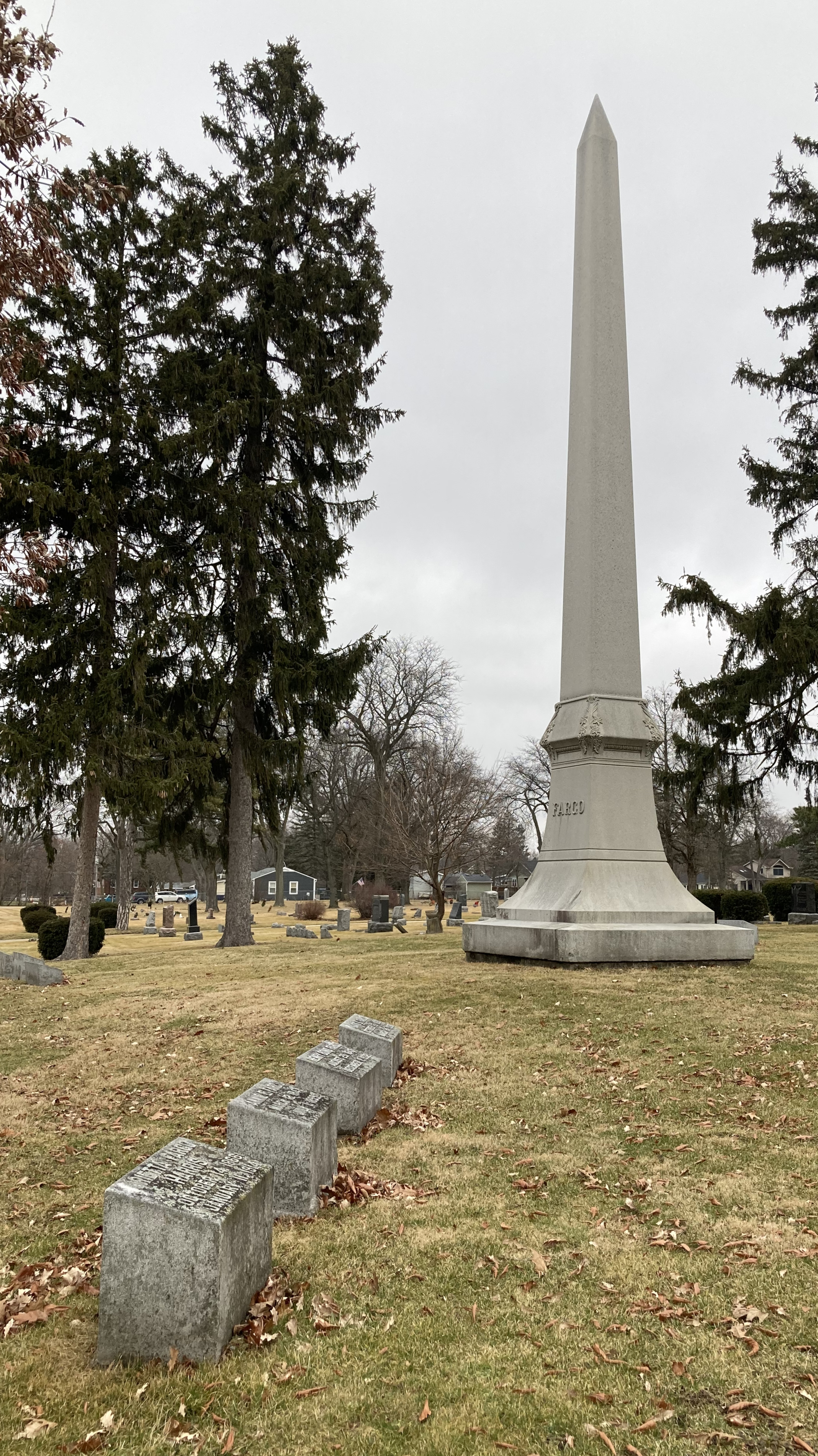
Fargo's grave at Oak Hill Cemetery

Henry Bond Fargo, a fourth cousin once removed of J. C. and William Fargo, was born in 1843 in Warsaw, New York. The son of blacksmith William N. Fargo, Henry Fargo moved with his family to Delavan, Wisconsin when he was a child. By 1860, the family had removed to Fond du Lac. Fargo began his first business enterprises in his new home, becoming involved with real estate. He opened a real estate agency in Redwood Falls, Minnesota. His success in his endeavors brought him to the attention of E. A. Cummings & Co., the largest real estate business in Chicago, Illinois, who hired Fargo as their principal salesman. Henry moved to Geneva, Illinois in 1887 into the former home of Isaac Wilson. Fargo became a prominent politician and businessman in Geneva. Fargo founded the First National Bank of Geneva and was its first president. He was able to convince the Appleton Manufacturing Company of Appleton, Wisconsin to relocate to Geneva in the 1890s. Fargo constructed a racetrack and theater in Geneva. Fargo was elected Mayor of Geneva in 1903 and served for a year. In 1907, he ran for mayor again and served three years. In 1912, Fargo, as a candidate of the Progressive Party, was elected to the Illinois House of Representatives as one of three members from the 14th district. The 14th district consisted of Kane and Kendall counties. In the 1914, Fargo finished third in the Progressive Party primary behind nominees Charles Doetschman and R. Waite Joslyn. Doetschman and Joslyn in turn would finish fourth and fifth respectively for three seats.

In 1925, Fargo built the Fargo Theater Building in Sycamore. He also built a hotel in Sycamore and another theater in neighboring DeKalb. Fargo died in 1932 in Geneva and was buried in Oak Hill Cemetery.

=== Personal life ===
Fargo married Anna Elizabeth Schoolcraft; together they had a daughter Orietta and a son Charles Henry. Elizabeth died in 1899. Fargo remarried to Kate Patty a year later, who died in 1930. Fargo became active in Freemasonry while in Redwood Falls. After he moved to Geneva, he joined Jerusalem Temple Lodge #90. Fargo willed his house to the Masons when he died. However, the order elected to exchange the house with a property that Fargo's granddaughters owned downtown. The house was recognized by the National Park Service with a listing on the National Register of Historic Places on May 12, 2008.
