= Forks (disambiguation) =

A fork is a utensil, whose long handle terminates in a head that branches into several narrow tines.

Forks may also refer to:

- Forks, New York, a hamlet in the United States
- Forks, Washington, a town in the United States
- Forks Township, Northampton County, Pennsylvania, a township in the United States
- Forks Township, Sullivan County, Pennsylvania, a township in the United States
- "Forks" (The Bear), a 2023 episode of The Bear TV series

== See also ==
- Fork (disambiguation)
- The Forks (disambiguation)
