= Fargo =

Fargo usually refers to:

- Fargo, North Dakota, US
- Fargo (1996 film), a black comedy crime film by the Coen brothers
- Fargo (TV series), a crime anthology television series on FX
- Wells Fargo, a financial services company

Fargo may also refer to:

== Other places ==
=== United States ===
- Fargo, Arkansas
- Fargo, Georgia
- Fargo, Indiana
- Fargo, Ohio
- Fargo, Oklahoma
- Fargo, Wisconsin

=== England ===
- Fargo Plantation, a location south of Stonehenge that includes a Neolithic/Bronze Age henge and barrow cemetery

== Art, entertainment, and media ==
- Fargo (1952 film), an American western film directed by Lewis D. Collins
- Fargo, a character from the anime series Bubblegum Crisis
- Fargo, a character from the video game Chrono Cross
- Douglas Fargo, a character from the TV-series "Eureka"
- "Fargo", a track by Caravan Palace on the 2019 album Chronologic

== Military ==
- Fargo-class cruiser, a ship design of the US Navy
  - USS Fargo (CL-106), the first Fargo-class cruiser
- Mikoyan-Gurevich MiG-9 (NATO reporting name: "Fargo"), a Soviet fighter plane
- USS Fargo (CL-85), original name for the USS Langley (CVL-27) aircraft carrier
- Fargo, the ammunition compound next to the Royal School of Artillery

== Vehicles ==
- Fargo Trucks, originally manufactured by the Chrysler Corporation, later by Askam
- Isuzu Fargo, a commercial vehicle

== Other uses ==
- FARGO (programming language)
- Fargo (surname)

== See also ==
- Fargodome, an indoor athletic stadium in Fargo, North Dakota
- Fargo–Moorhead, the metropolitan area comprising Fargo, North Dakota, Moorhead, Minnesota, and the surrounding communities
  - Fargo-Moorhead RedHawks, a baseball team
  - Fargo-Moorhead Beez, a former basketball team
  - Fargo-Moorhead Fever, a former basketball team
