= Fargo (surname) =

Fargo is a surname. Notable people with the surname include:

- Brian Fargo (born 1962), American video game designer, developer, producer and executive
- Donna Fargo (born 1945), American country music singer-songwriter
- Frank Anthony Fargo (1933–2009), Italian/Canadian chemist, entrepreneur and philanthropist
- Greg Fargo (born 1983), Canadian ice hockey coach
- Heather Fargo (born 1952), former Mayor and former City Council Member of Sacramento
- Henry Bond Fargo (1843–1932), American banker and politician
- Irene Fargo (1963–2022), Italian singer and stage actress
- Jackie Fargo (1930–2013), retired American professional wrestler
- J. C. Fargo (1829–1915), James Congdell Fargo, former president of American Express
- Susan Fargo (1942–2019), American politician
- Thomas B. Fargo (born 1948), United States Naval admiral
- William Fargo (1818–1881), pioneer American expressman, namesake of Fargo, North Dakota

Fictional characters:

- Chief Judge Fargo, from the Judge Dredd comic strip in 2000 AD
- Douglas Fargo, from the TV series Eureka
