= Vafs Rural District =

Rural district in Markazi province, Iran

Vafs Rural District Persian: دهستان وفس
- Rural District
- Location within Iran
- Coordinates: 34°48′N 49°22′E
- Country: Iran
- Province: Markazi
- County: Komijan
- District: Central
- Established: 2010

Population (2016)
  - Total: 8,038
- Time zone: UTC+3:30 (IRST)

Vafs Rural District (Persian: دهستان وفس) is in the Central District of Komijan County, Markazi province, Iran.

== History ==
In 2010, Vafs Rural District was created in the Central District.

== Demographics ==
=== Population ===
At the time of the 2011 National Census, the rural district's population was 8,816 in 2,736 households. The 2016 census measured the population of the rural district as 8,038 in 2,644 households. The most populous of its 22 villages was Samqavor, with 2,107 people.

=== Other villages in the rural district ===
- Amereh
- Chal Mian
- Chehreqan
- Farak
- Farisabad
- Fathabad
- Fazlabad
- Khomar Baghi
- Meydanak
- Rowshanai
- Takyeh
- Ud Aghaj
- Vafs
- Valazjerd
- Zaduqabad
