= Komijan =

City in Markazi province, Iran

Komijan Persian: کمیجان
- City
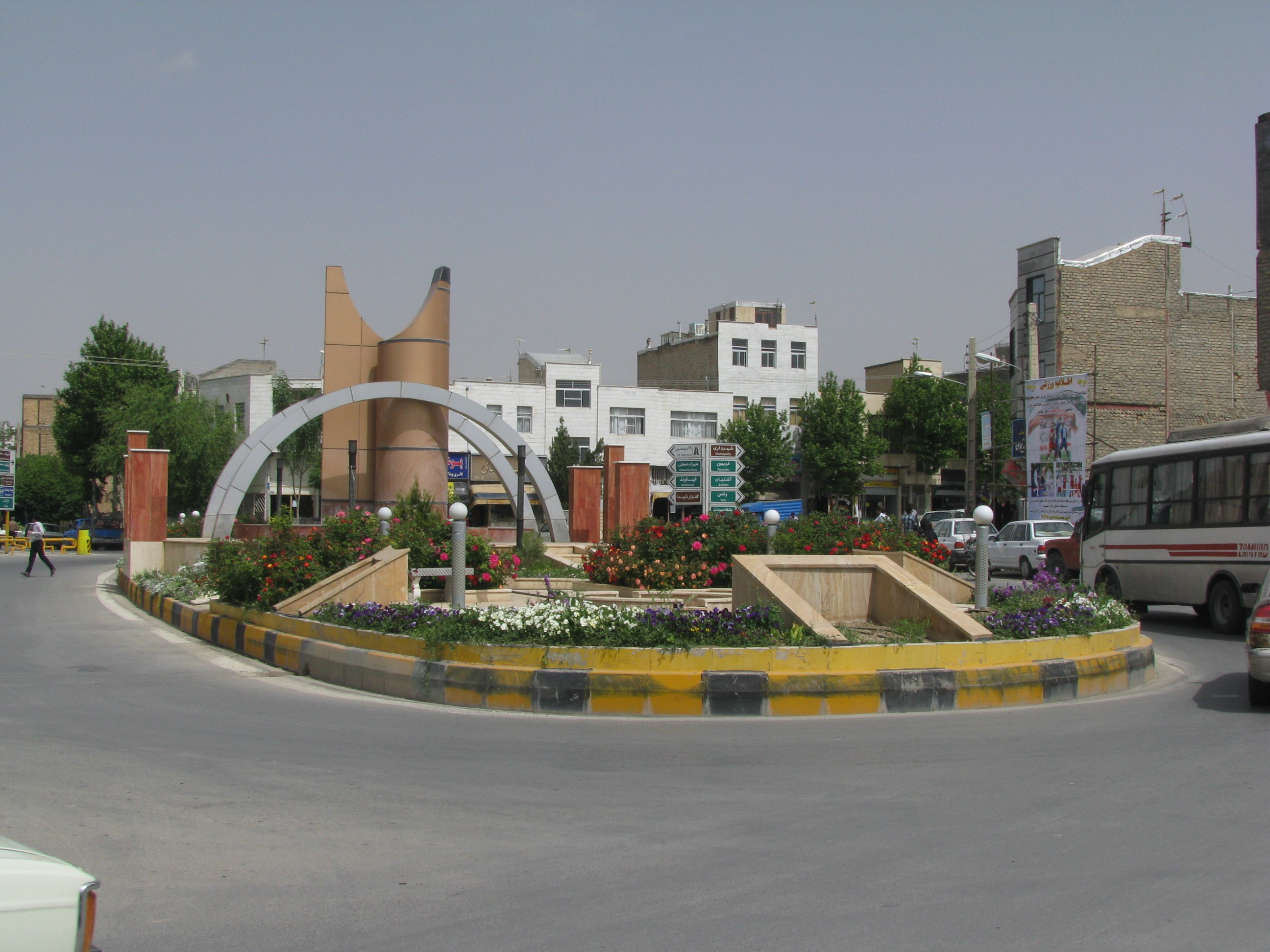
- Teacher Square in Komijan

- Location within Iran
- Coordinates: 34°43′15″N 49°19′39″E
- Country: Iran
- Province: Markazi
- County: Komijan
- District: Central

Population (2016)
  - Total: 8,776
- Time zone: UTC+3:30 (IRST)
- Website: komijan.com

Komijan (Persian: کمیجان) (Note: Also romanized as Komeyjān and Komījān; also known as Khūmajān, Komāzān, Komejān, Komīzān, and Kūmīzān) is a city in the Central District of Komijan County, Markazi province, Iran, serving as capital of both the county and the district.

== History ==
The 14th-century author Hamdallah Mustawfi listed Komijan (as Kūmjān) as one of the main villages in the Sharahin district under Hamadan.

== Demographics ==
=== Population ===
At the time of the 2006 National Census, the city's population was 7,358 in 2,004 households. The following census in 2011 counted 9,195 people in 2,564 households. The 2016 census measured the population of the city as 8,776 people in 2,749 households.

== City life ==
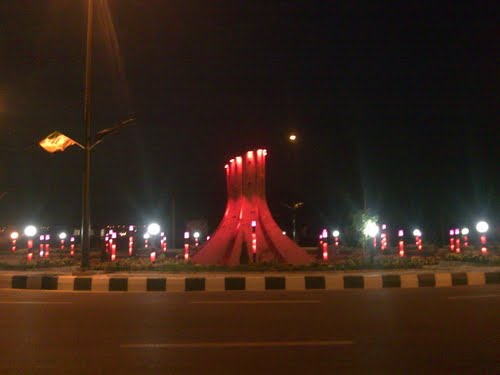
City square

Although many people live in Komijan, its numbers are decreasing as many leave Komijan to go and live in Tehran or other main cities of Iran. Some of the summer resorts around Komijan are Teraran (darband), Vafs. The Vafs spa is a touristic place around Komijan. Tourists of the villages usually visit them in the summer.

== Neighborhoods ==
=== Ghaleh ===
The area is considered the highest point of the city and the urban fabric of the old location, which is called the city of Bam.

=== Old Ghaleh ===
The area of the neighborhood near the intersection Mahdiyeh Njarlar 16 meters from the street, which is one of the neighborhoods of Old komijan. This place is a mosque called the Masjid Mosque Zaman the old mosque and the Grand Parad Rah is considered that the establishment of local Friday Prayers as well.

=== Anar ===
Anar was originally separated from Komijan and was located in its east, but due to its very short distance, it was gradually connected to Komijan through the construction of residential and commercial places and became one of the large neighborhoods of Komijan. The entrance of Komijan city is from Arak side of this neighborhood, which is one of the big and famous neighborhoods of this city. (Azad and Payame Noor Universities, Hospital, Road and Transportation Department, Welfare and Groundwater Department are located in this neighborhood.)

This village itself has three neighborhoods called Qala-e-Miandeh-Qala-e-Bala, Ken-e-Icheh and Qala-e-Gol Ahmad. It is called Anar (very bright) because it has many springs such as Tik and Bolagh springs and mills and old and large water aqueducts or because it has active Zoroastrian fire temples. One of the largest tribes is Anari and Mohammad Karim, which can be seen in its population dispersion in the villages of Rastkordan and Qazooq, as well as Rahan (Saqarjuq, Dastjan and Zanjeiran, Kudzar and Aghaziart). Chehrgazi hill is located in the northern part of this large neighborhood.

Agricultural lands and good weather make this neighborhood a place for guests to spend the summer, especially in hot summers. It has the most cultivated lands in the city in terms of population and has very fertile soil, so that in the past it was considered one of the most important properties of the Bahadori family (Jafar Khan Bahadori, son of Ibrahim Khan Asem Al-Saltanah Bahadori). Other clans in this neighborhood include Anari, Azimi, Kadivar, Moradi, Alizadeh Bastan and Pezeshki.

The Pezeshki family is the founder of modern medicine and Manouchehr Khan Pezeshki is one of the residents of this large old village and the founder of modern education in the city. Most people work in agriculture, and in recent years young people have turned to government jobs. This neighborhood has been extended along the Komijan-Arak road since ancient times.

Other neighborhoods include:

- Ghol Iche
- Ali Gholi Bagh
- Farhanghian
- Gholestan
- Najarlar
- Maskan Mehr
- Yokhre Hasar
- Hassanabd
- Sarab
- Essaabad

== Geography ==
Komijan is 90 kilometres (56 mi) northwest of Markazi's capital Arak. It has an approximate elevation of 1,550 metres (5,090 ft) above sea level.

=== Climate ===
Komijan has a semi-arid climate, characterized with extremely cold winters where the minimum temperature could fall down to −25 °C (−13 °F). On the other hand, summertime in Komijan is relatively hot with temperatures that could reach up to 36 °C (97 °F). The annual precipitation averages 250 millimetres (9.8 in).

Climate data for Komijan
Month	Jan	Feb	Mar	Apr	May	Jun	Jul	Aug	Sep	Oct	Nov	Dec	Year
Record high °C (°F)	9.2 (48.6)	13.9 (57.0)	20.6 (69.1)	26.2 (79.2)	29.1 (84.4)	33.1 (91.6)	38.0 (100.4)	36.2 (97.2)	34.0 (93.2)	27.9 (82.2)	20.6 (69.1)	14.0 (57.2)	38.0 (100.4)
Mean daily maximum °C (°F)	−3 (27)	−1 (30)	4 (39)	13 (55)	18 (64)	22 (72)	26 (79)	26 (79)	23 (73)	16 (61)	7 (45)	—	6 (43)
Daily mean °C (°F)	−9 (16)	−7 (19)	−1 (30)	6 (43)	11 (52)	15 (59)	19 (66)	19 (66)	15 (59)	8 (46)	1 (34)	−5 (23)	6 (43)
Mean daily minimum °C (°F)	−14 (7)	−12 (10)	−6 (21)	—	5 (41)	8 (46)	12 (54)	12 (54)	7 (45)	1 (34)	−3 (27)	−9 (16)	32 (90)
Record low °C (°F)	−36.0 (−32.8)	−35.0 (−31.0)	−30.1 (−22.2)	−16.0 (3.2)	−7.6 (18.3)	−3.6 (25.5)	1.4 (34.5)	−1.1 (30.0)	−4.1 (24.6)	−14.6 (5.7)	−23.8 (−10.8)	−31.2 (−24.2)	−36.0 (−32.8)
Average precipitation mm (inches)	23.7 (0.93)	26.7 (1.05)	28.2 (1.11)	54.5 (2.15)	84.6 (3.33)	73.9 (2.91)	43.2 (1.70)	35.7 (1.41)	26.0 (1.02)	38.5 (1.52)	28.2 (1.11)	22.8 (0.90)	486 (19.1)
Source: Weatherbase

== Economy ==
Komijan produces large amounts of wheat and cotton. It is also well known for its pomegranates and melons. The major product of horticulture and cultivation in the city of Kamijan is grapes and almonds. Komijan Industrial City, the largest industrial city in Iran, is located in Komijan.

== Universities ==
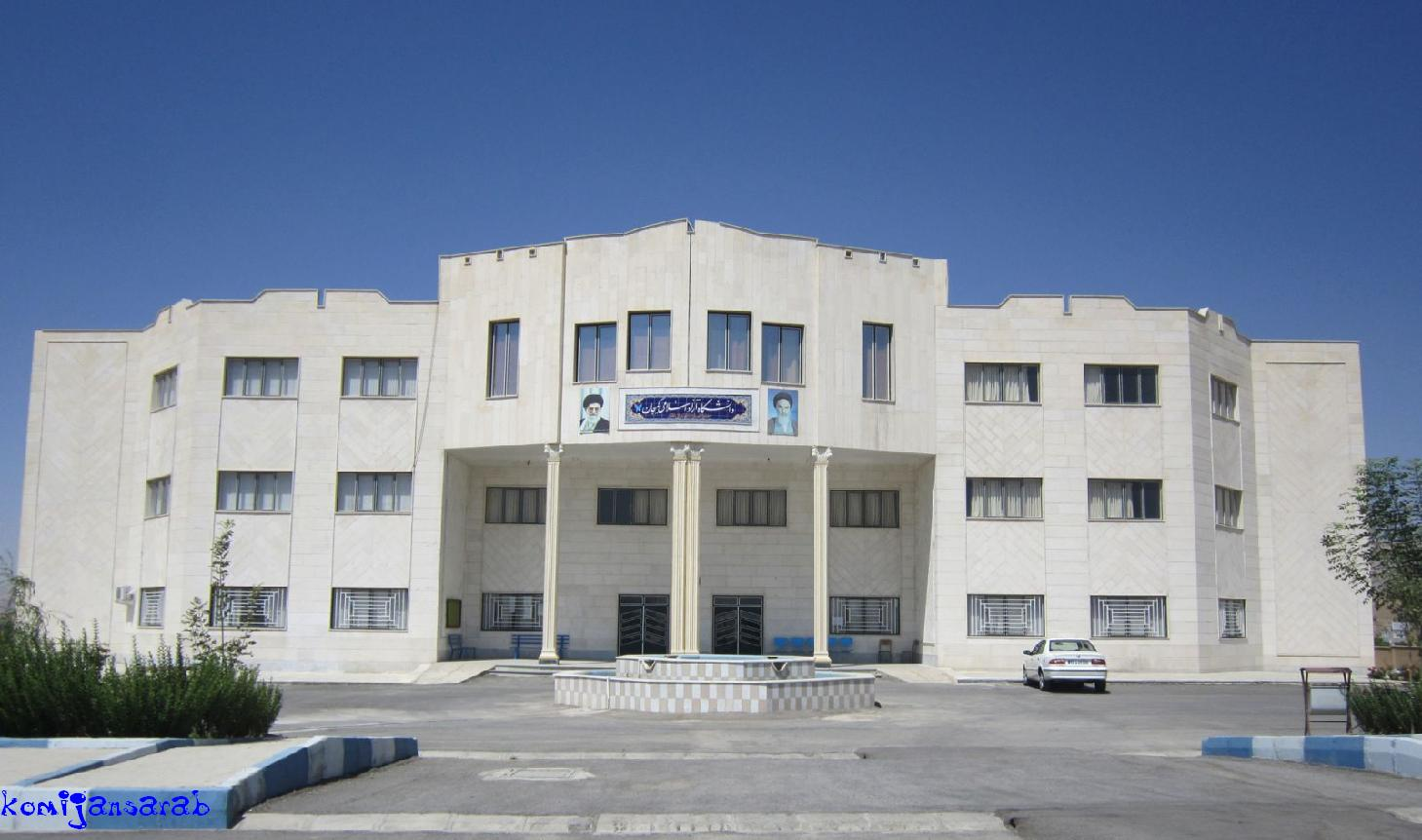
Azad university department

Three universities are situated in Komijan, namely the Komijan branch of the Komijan University, Islamic Azad University of komijan and the Komijan branch of the Payame Noor University. Komijan City is situated in Komijan County.

== See also ==
- Fakhr-al-Din Iraqi
- Komijan Industrial Town

Media related to Komijan at Wikimedia Commons
