= Elizabeth Place =

Historic house in Illinois, United States

- U.S. National Register of Historic Places
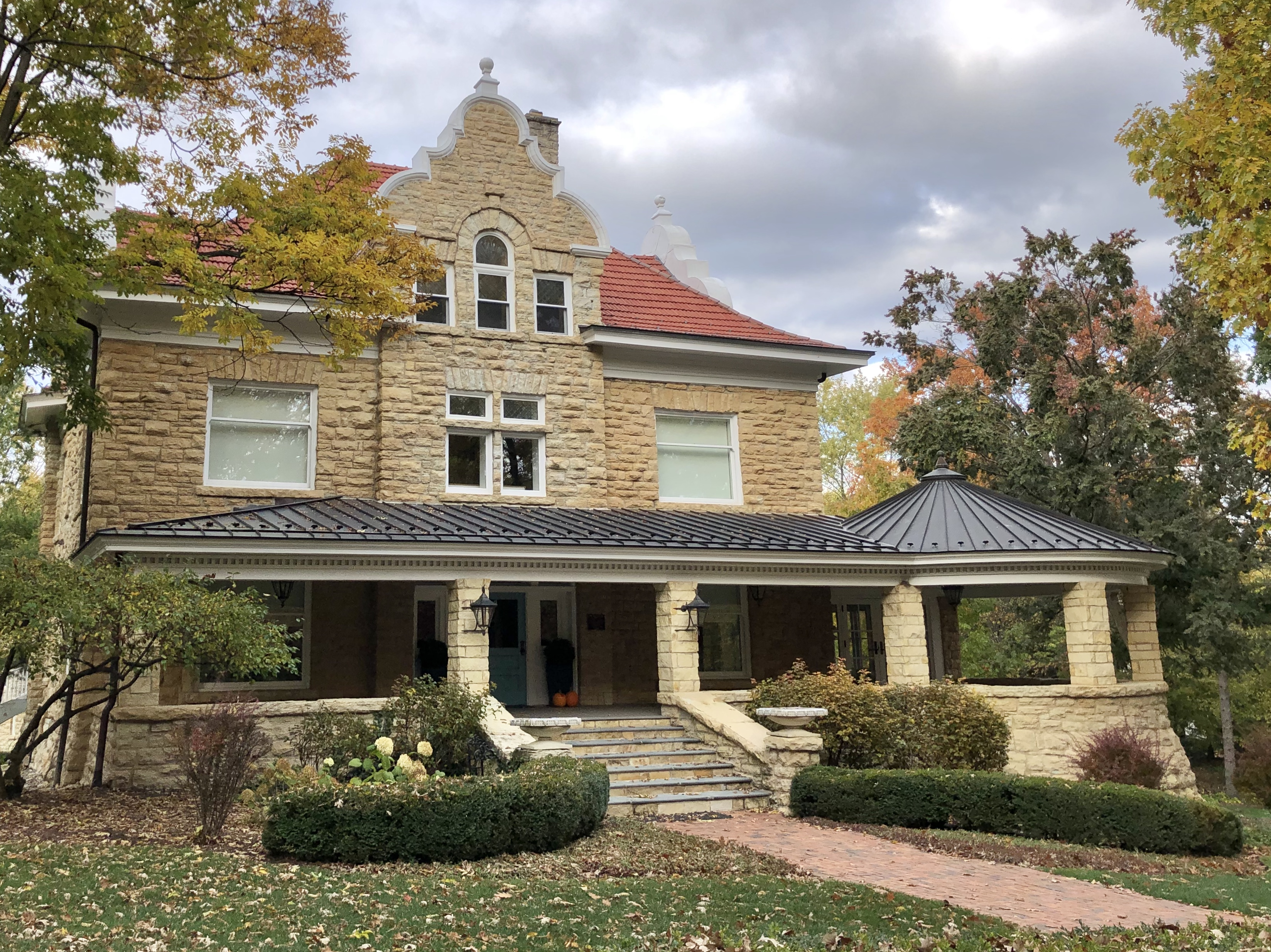

- Location within Illinois Location within the United States
- Location: 316 Elizabeth Pl., Geneva, Illinois
- Coordinates: 41°52′46″N 88°18′39″W
- Area: 1.7 acres (0.69 ha)
- Built: 1900
- Architectural style: Mission Revival
- NRHP reference No.: 08000398
- Added to NRHP: May 12, 2008

Elizabeth Place, or the Henry Bond Fargo House, is a historic residence in Geneva, Illinois in the Mission Revival style. The house was owned by Henry Bond Fargo, a prominent local businessmen who brought several early industries to Geneva. It was added to the National Register of Historic Places in 2008.

== History ==
Henry Bond Fargo was born in 1843 in Warsaw, New York. Fargo was the fourth cousin, once removed of William George Fargo, one of the founders of Wells Fargo and Company. Fargo began to work in real estate in Fond du Lac, Wisconsin. He was successful in these endeavors, and E. A. Cummings and Co., the largest real estate business in Chicago, Illinois, offered him a position as a principal salesman, which he accepted. He moved to the far suburb of Geneva in 1887 to continue his career.

Fargo ordered the construction of a new house in 1898 just west of the Fox River. It took two years to complete the house; in the meantime, Fargo's wife Annie Elizabeth Fargo died in 1899. In her honor, he named the new dwelling Elizabeth Place. Fargo was elected Geneva's mayor in 1903 and served for a full year; he was later re-elected mayor from 1907 to 1910. Two years later, he was elected to the Illinois House of Representatives and served a two-year term. In 1919, he petitioned Geneva to rename the street of his residence Elizabeth Place to match the house's name. Henry Bond Fargo was a lifelong Freemason, and offered his home to the Masons upon his death in 1932. However, his children struck a deal with the Masons to instead donate a separate property at State and Second Streets, and the house remained in the family. The residence and coach house was added to the National Register of Historic Places on May 12, 2008.

== Architecture ==
Elizabeth Place is an example of a Mission Revival style residence. Most early residences in Geneva were either of Greek Revival or Italianate influence, making Elizabeth Place architecturally distinct in the immediate area. Inspired by Spanish missions in California, the style eventually spread throughout the nation in the early 20th century. The property features a residence, a coach house (a contributing property to the nomination), a wood frame garage, terraces, and a small creek. The house features parapets inspired by Spanish churches with Palladian windows on the south, west, and east sides. The roof features matte red clay tile made by Ludowici. Most of the exterior is locally quarried limestone in a soldier course. A wrap-around porch is screened on the east side and open on the south side. This porch was reconstructed in 2006 based on photographs from the 1940s. A second porch was added in 2006 to allow access to the first floor from the north side. The south side has four single hung windows and a large entrance door with sidelights. A chimney breaks through the roof of the west side.

The basement is accessed through the kitchen and features a walk out door to the north side to grade. The first floor is centered on a stair hall with stairs to the second floor. This hall has a large wood entrance door with a large glass light. An oversized oak newel with an ornate cap features in the center of the staircase, which has large wood balusters. Most of the first floor maintains its historic integrity except for the kitchen, which was also remodeled in 2006. The living room is to the east of the stair hall with a fireplace, a coffered ceiling, and a hardwood floor. A five-paneled door leads to the dining room, which is similarly themed (with no fireplace). The family parlor is to the west of the entrance with built-in bookshelves, paneled walls, a coffered ceiling, and a wood floor. The west and south sides of the room each have two single hung windows. On the second floor, the stair hall features a large sitting area. The northeast corner room, originally a bedroom, was converted into the master bathroom. A second bathroom along the back hall was original before being remodeled in the 1920s or 1930s. The two south bedrooms each have a large window. A small, secondary staircase leads from the back hall to the kitchen, and a third staircase leads to the third floor ballroom. This floor was originally open and unfinished, but has since been remodeled to fit a bedroom, a bathroom and an open space with a fireplace.

The coach house is 30 square feet (2.8 m^{2}) with a four-sided gable asphalt shingle roof. A stone walled courtyard, built around 1940, lies to the east, visually connecting the coach house to the main house. The coach house has thirteen double hung windows. The west side originally featured a garage door but was replaces for two large French doors with sidelights. The first floor is now used as a home office. A staircase leads to a small bedroom. A door on the east leads to the courtyard. A standalone garage was built in the early 1990s, featuring a single and a double garage door. The roof and the window patterns match the coach house.
