= Islamic Azad University, Komijan Branch =

Private university in Komijan, Iran

Coordinates: 34°43′09″N 49°19′36″E

- دانشگاه آزاد اسلامی واحد کمیجان; Dāneshgāh-e Āzād-e Eslāmi, Vāhed-e Komijān
- Type: Private
- Established: 1985
- Budget: ~10,000
- Chancellor: Dibachi, Ph.D.
- Academic staff: 620+ Full-time(2013)
- Administrative staff: 1,500+
- Students: 3,000
- Undergraduates: 250
- Postgraduates: 2,600
- Location: Komijan, Markazi Province, Iran

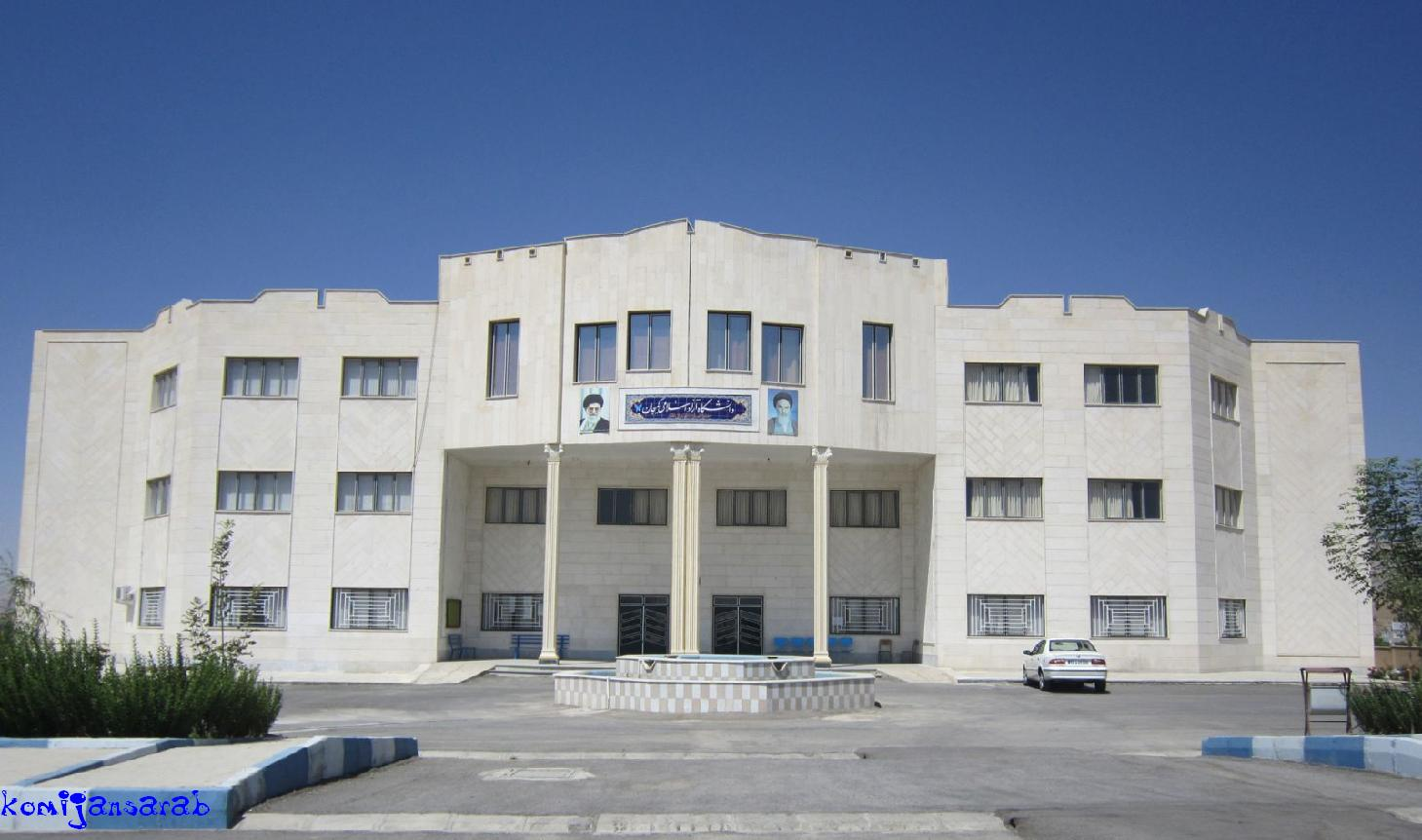
Office Building

The Islamic Azad University, Komijan Branch (Persian: دانشگاه آزاد اسلامی کمیجان, Dāneshgāh-e Āzād-e Eslāmi Komijan) is a branch of Islamic Azad University. The university was established in Komijan, Iran, in 2003 with 500 students and seven fields of study. The university now consists of 11 faculties, one high college, one technical college, one educational center and three research centers. In 2011, about 3,000 students enrolled.

== Academics ==
- Public Management
- Business Management
- Accounting
- Mechanical Engineering
- Rights
- Biology
- Electrical Engineering
- Materials and Metallurgy Engineering
- Computer Engineering
- Electronic Engineering
- Computer graphics
- Mechanical - Manufacturing and Machining
- Mechanical Engineering - Mechanical Vehicle
- Civil Engineering - Building
- Primary Education
- Civil Engineering

== Buildings ==
- Management Building
- Technical and Engineering Building
- Agricultural Building
- Rights Building

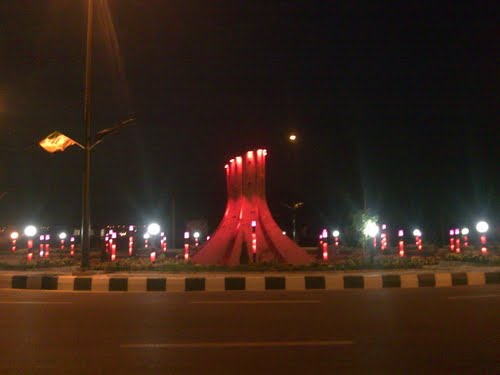
Azad University Square

== See also ==
- Higher education in Iran
- List of universities in Iran
- Islamic Azad University
