= Milajerd =

City in Markazi province, Iran

Milajerd Persian: ميلاجرد
- City
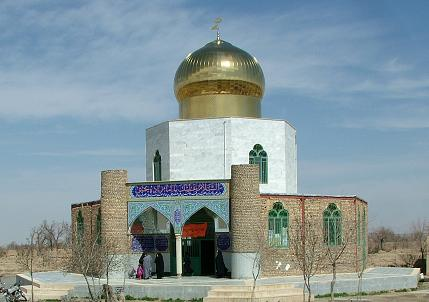
- Emamzadeh Yahya in the city of Milajerd

- Location within Iran
- Coordinates: 34°37′17″N 49°12′29″E
- Country: Iran
- Province: Markazi
- County: Komijan
- District: Milajerd
- Established as a city: 2000

Population (2016)
  - Total: 9,288
- Time zone: UTC+3:30 (IRST)

Milajerd (Persian: ميلاجرد) (Note: Also romanized as Mīlājerd; also known as Melājerd and Mīlājīrd) is a city in, and the capital of, Milajerd District in Komijan County, Markazi province, Iran. It also serves as the administrative center for Milajerd Rural District. The 14th-century author Hamdallah Mustawfi listed Milajerd as one of the main villages in the Sharahin district under Hamadan. The village of Milajerd, after merging with the village of Mohammadabad, was converted into a city in 2000.

== Demographics ==
=== Population ===
At the time of the 2006 National Census, the city's population was 8,928 in 2,168 households. The following census in 2011 counted 9,357 people in 2,490 households. The 2016 census measured the population of the city as 9,288 people in 2,738 households.
