= Fork Township =

Fork Township may refer to the following places in the United States:

- Fork Township, Michigan
- Fork Township, Minnesota
- Fork Township, Wayne County, North Carolina
- Forks Township, Northampton County, Pennsylvania
- Forks Township, Sullivan County, Pennsylvania
