= Validabad, Fars =

Validabad وليداباد
- Village
- Location within Iran
- Coordinates: 29°26′52″N 51°47′01″E
- Country: Iran
- Province: Fars
- County: Kazerun
- Bakhsh: Jereh and Baladeh
- Rural District: Jereh

Population (2016)
  - Total: 90
- Time zone: UTC+3:30 (IRST)
  - Summer (DST): UTC+4:30 (IRDT)

Validabad (Persian: وليداباد, also Romanized as Valīdābād) is a village in Jereh, in the Jereh and Baladeh of Kazerun County, Fars province, Iran. At the 2016 census, its population was 90, in 26 families.
