= Furca =

Furca (Latin for "fork"), plural forms furcae or furcas, or its diminutive, furcula, may refer to:

== Biology ==
- Furca (genus), a prehistoric arthropod
- Furca (springtail), an anatomical structure in springtail entognaths.
- Caudal furca ("tail fork"), part of the telson of some crustaceans
- Furcula, the wishbone of birds and some dinosaurs
- Furcula (moth) a genus of Noctuid moths
- Any small forked structure of animal anatomy

== Other uses ==
- Forked cross, a cross in Gothic architecture
- Furca (punishment), a cross-like instrument for punishment
- Furcas, a demonic mythological character
- Furca, a carrying pole for the sarcina of Roman legionaries
- Furca, the Aromanian name of Fourka, a village in Greece

== See also ==
- Fork (disambiguation)
