= Susanabad, Salmas =

Susanabad سوسن اباد
- Village
- Location within Iran
- Coordinates: 38°02′23″N 44°36′57″E
- Country: Iran
- Province: West Azerbaijan
- County: Salmas
- Bakhsh: Kuhsar
- Rural District: Chahriq

Population (2006)
  - Total: 167
- Time zone: UTC+3:30 (IRST)
  - Summer (DST): UTC+4:30 (IRDT)

Susanabad (Persian: سوسن اباد, also Romanized as Sūsanābād) is a village in Chahriq Rural District, Kuhsar District, Salmas County, West Azerbaijan Province, Iran. At the 2006 census, its population was 167, in 38 families.
