= Park, Yazd =

Park پرك
- Village
- Location within Iran
- Coordinates: 31°51′31″N 55°48′34″E
- Country: Iran
- Province: Yazd
- County: Behabad
- Bakhsh: Central
- Rural District: Jolgeh

Population (2006)
  - Total: 120
- Time zone: UTC+3:30 (IRST)
  - Summer (DST): UTC+4:30 (IRDT)

Park (Persian: پرك; also known as Fark) is a village in Jolgeh Rural District, in the Central District of Behabad County, Yazd Province, Iran. At the 2006 census, its population was 120, in 33 families.
