= Masonic Temple (Aurora, Illinois) =

- U.S. National Register of Historic Places
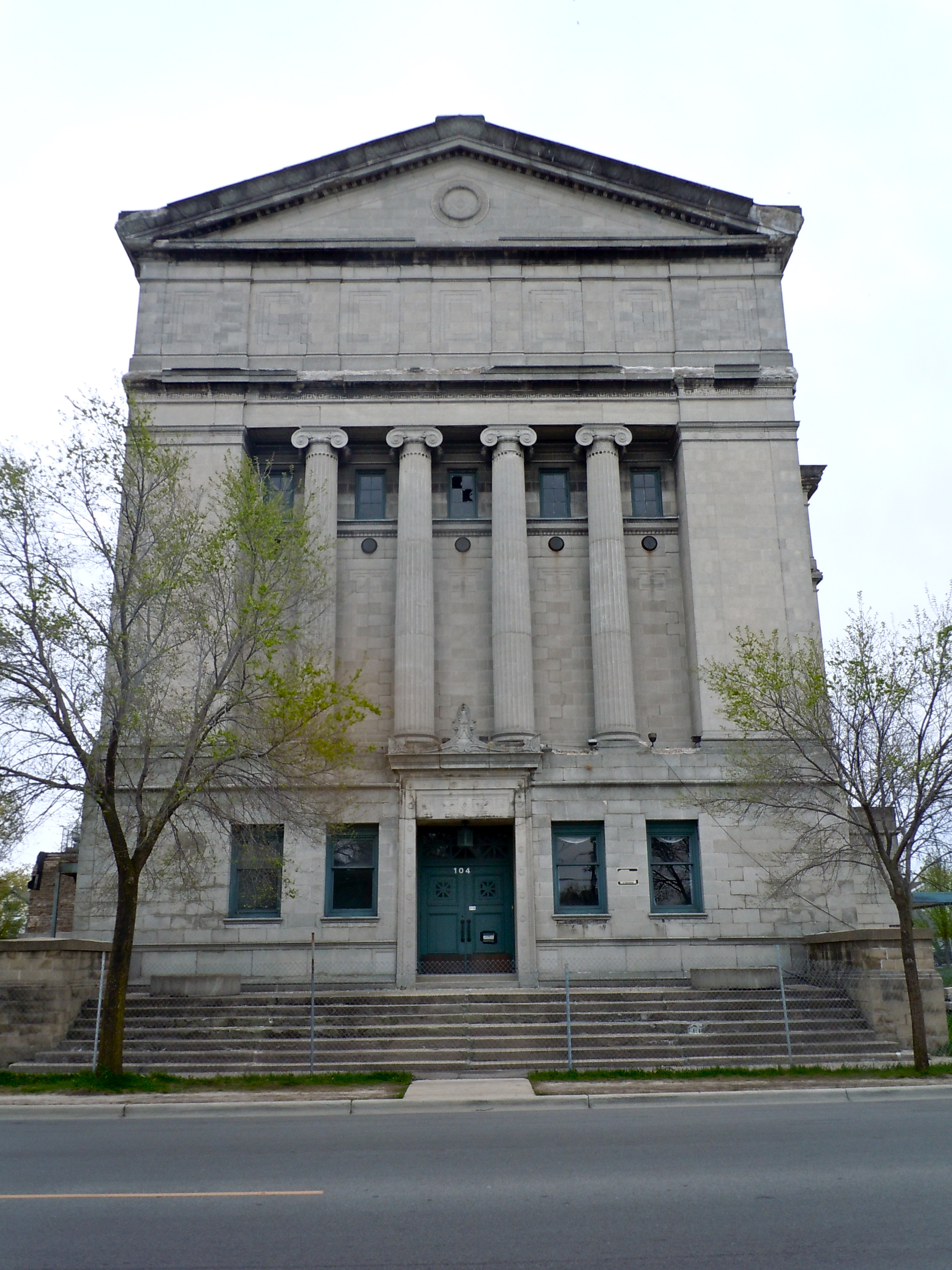

- Location within Illinois Location within the United States
- Location: 104 S. Lincoln Ave. Aurora, Kane County, Illinois, United States
- Coordinates: 41°45′12″N 88°18′46″W
- Built: 1924
- Architect: William Q. Bendus
- Architectural style: Classical Revival
- NRHP reference No.: 82002545
- Added to NRHP: March 19, 1982

The Masonic Temple in Aurora, Illinois was a historical building where Freemasons held meetings. Opened in 1924, it was added to the National Register of Historic Places in 1982. On October 7, 2019 it was gutted by fire, leading to its subsequent demolition.

== History ==
The Jerusalem Temple Lodge #90 Masonic body was formed in Aurora, Illinois in October 1850, only 13 years after the city was founded. The first Worshipful Master was Benjamin Franklin Hall, who later became the first mayor of Aurora in 1857. They first met in the Main Street Building until moving into a Masonic Hall on Fox Street in 1866. The order moved again in 1910 to Broadway Street.

The Masons quickly outgrew this building and desired to build a new temple at which to hold meetings. The body boasted almost a thousand members at this point, and they were easily able to raise over $200,000 for a new structure. Construction began on November 28, 1921, and the structure was opened on March 10, 1924. It was added to the National Register of Historic Places on March 19, 1982. Sold by the lodge in the 1980s, the building was then used as a banquet facility. After the closure of that facility in 2006, the building suffered from deferred maintenance, resulting in water infiltration and damage to architectural features.

Little is known about the architect, William Q. Bendus. The building was built in the Neo-classical style and may have been influenced by the Cleveland Museum of Art. The six-story Temple was situated on a hill and featured ionic columns. Masonic imagery adorned the tympanum. Two lodge rooms in the temple could each seat over two hundred people. The original designs called for a ballroom, but this was never finished and was converted to a storage room. Other rooms in the building included a game room and kitchen.

On October 7, 2019, the Aurora Masonic Temple sustained catastrophic damage from a fire; the remains were demolished several days later, but the columns and Masonic emblem from the west elevation were carefully dismounted for preservation.
