= The Forks, Kentucky =

Unincorporated community in Kentucky, United States

- Unincorporated community
- Location within the state of Kentucky The; Forks (the United States)
- Coordinates: 37°49′24″N 84°5′15″W
- Country: United States
- State: Kentucky
- County: Estill
- Elevation: 902 ft (275 m)
- Time zone: UTC-5 (Eastern (EST))
  - Summer (DST): UTC-4 (EDT)
- GNIS feature ID: 2440466

The Forks is an unincorporated community located in Estill County, Kentucky, United States.
