= Esfandan, Kerman =

Esfandan اسفندان
- Village
- Location within Iran
- Coordinates: 28°42′00″N 57°58′12″E
- Country: Iran
- Province: Kerman
- County: Jiroft
- Bakhsh: Jebalbarez
- Rural District: Rezvan

Population (2006)
  - Total: 34
- Time zone: UTC+3:30 (IRST)
  - Summer (DST): UTC+4:30 (IRDT)

Esfandan (Persian: اسفندان, also Romanized as Esfandān) is a village in Rezvan Rural District, Jebalbarez District, Jiroft County, Kerman Province, Iran. At the 2006 census, its population was 34, in 9 families.
