= Khosrow Beyk Rural District =

Rural district in Markazi province, Iran

Khosrow Beyk Rural District Persian: دهستان خسروبيك
- Rural District
- Location within Iran
- Coordinates: 34°47′N 49°11′E
- Country: Iran
- Province: Markazi
- County: Komijan
- District: Milajerd
- Established: 1987
- Capital: Khosrow Beyg

Population (2016)
  - Total: 3,540
- Time zone: UTC+3:30 (IRST)

Khosrow Beyk Rural District (Persian: دهستان خسروبيك) is in Milajerd District of Komijan County, Markazi province, Iran. Its capital is the village of Khosrow Beyg.

== Demographics ==
=== Population ===
At the time of the 2006 National Census, the rural district's population was 6,398 in 1,628 households. There were 4,058 inhabitants in 1,150 households at the following census of 2011. The 2016 census measured the population of the rural district as 3,540 in 1,049 households. The most populous of its 17 villages was Khosrow Beyg, with 1,604 people.

=== Other villages in the rural district ===
- Aliabad
- Asemabad
- Kheyrabad
- Mahmudabad
- Sabzabad
- Sardarabad
- Seyjan
- Suran
- Tarlan
- Validabd
- Yengi Molk
