= Esfandan Rural District =

Rural district in Markazi province, Iran

Esfandan Rural District Persian: دهستان اسفندان
- Rural District
- Location within Iran
- Coordinates: 34°36′N 49°22′E
- Country: Iran
- Province: Markazi
- County: Komijan
- District: Central
- Established: 1987
- Capital: Esfandan

Population (2016)
  - Total: 4,372
- Time zone: UTC+3:30 (IRST)

Esfandan Rural District (Persian: دهستان اسفندان) is in the Central District of Komijan County, Markazi province, Iran. Its capital is the village of Esfandan.

== Demographics ==
=== Population ===
At the time of the 2006 National Census, the rural district's population was 9,074 in 2,358 households. There were 4,888 inhabitants in 1,432 households at the following census of 2011. The 2016 census measured the population of the rural district as 4,372 in 1,394 households. The most populous of its 10 villages was Esfandan, with 1,188 people.

=== Other villages in the rural district ===
- Chabar
- Chalbi
- Darreh Sabz
- Kalvan
- Kutabad
- Rastgordan
- Susanabad
- Yasavol
- Yasbolagh
