= Central District (Komijan County) =

District in Markazi province, Iran

Central District (Komijan County) Persian: بخش مرکزی شهرستان کمیجان
- District
- Location within Iran
- Coordinates: 34°45′N 49°22′E
- Country: Iran
- Province: Markazi
- County: Komijan
- Established: 2003
- Capital: Komijan

Population (2016)
  - Total: 21,186
- Time zone: UTC+3:30 (IRST)

The Central District of Komijan County (Persian: بخش مرکزی شهرستان کمیجان) is in Markazi province, Iran. Its capital is the city of Komijan.

== History ==
In 2010, Vafs Rural District was created in the district, and Khenejin Rural District was separated from it in the establishment of Farahan County.

== Demographics ==
=== Population ===
At the time of the 2006 National Census, the district's population was 26,749 in 6,973 households. The following census in 2011 counted 22,899 people in 6,732 households. The 2016 census measured the population of the district as 21,186 inhabitants in 6,787 households.

=== Administrative divisions ===
Central District (Komijan County) Population
Administrative Divisions	2006	2011	2016
Esfandan RD	9,074	4,888	4,372
Khenejin RD (Note: Transferred to Farahan County)	10,317		
Vafs RD		8,816	8,038
Komijan (city)	7,358	9,195	8,776
Total	26,749	22,899	21,186
RD = Rural District
