= Milajerd District =

District in Markazi province, Iran

Milajerd District Persian: بخش میلاجرد
- District
- Location within Iran
- Coordinates: 34°42′N 49°12′E
- Country: Iran
- Province: Markazi
- County: Komijan
- Established: 2003
- Capital: Milajerd

Population (2016)
  - Total: 15,255
- Time zone: UTC+3:30 (IRST)

Milajerd District (Persian: بخش میلاجرد) is in Komijan County, Markazi province, Iran. Its capital is the city of Milajerd.

== Demographics ==
=== Population ===
At the time of the 2006 National Census, the district's population was 18,547 in 4,566 households. The following census in 2011 counted 16,441 people in 4,442 households. The 2016 census measured the population of the district as 15,255 inhabitants in 4,552 households.

== Administrative divisions ==
Milajerd District Population
Administrative Divisions	2006	2011	2016
Khosrow Beyk RD	6,398	4,058	3,540
Milajerd RD	3,221	3,026	2,427
Milajerd (city)	8,928	9,357	9,288
Total	18,547	16,441	15,255
RD = Rural District
