= Komijan County =

County in Markazi province, Iran

Komijan County Persian: شهرستان کمیجان
- County
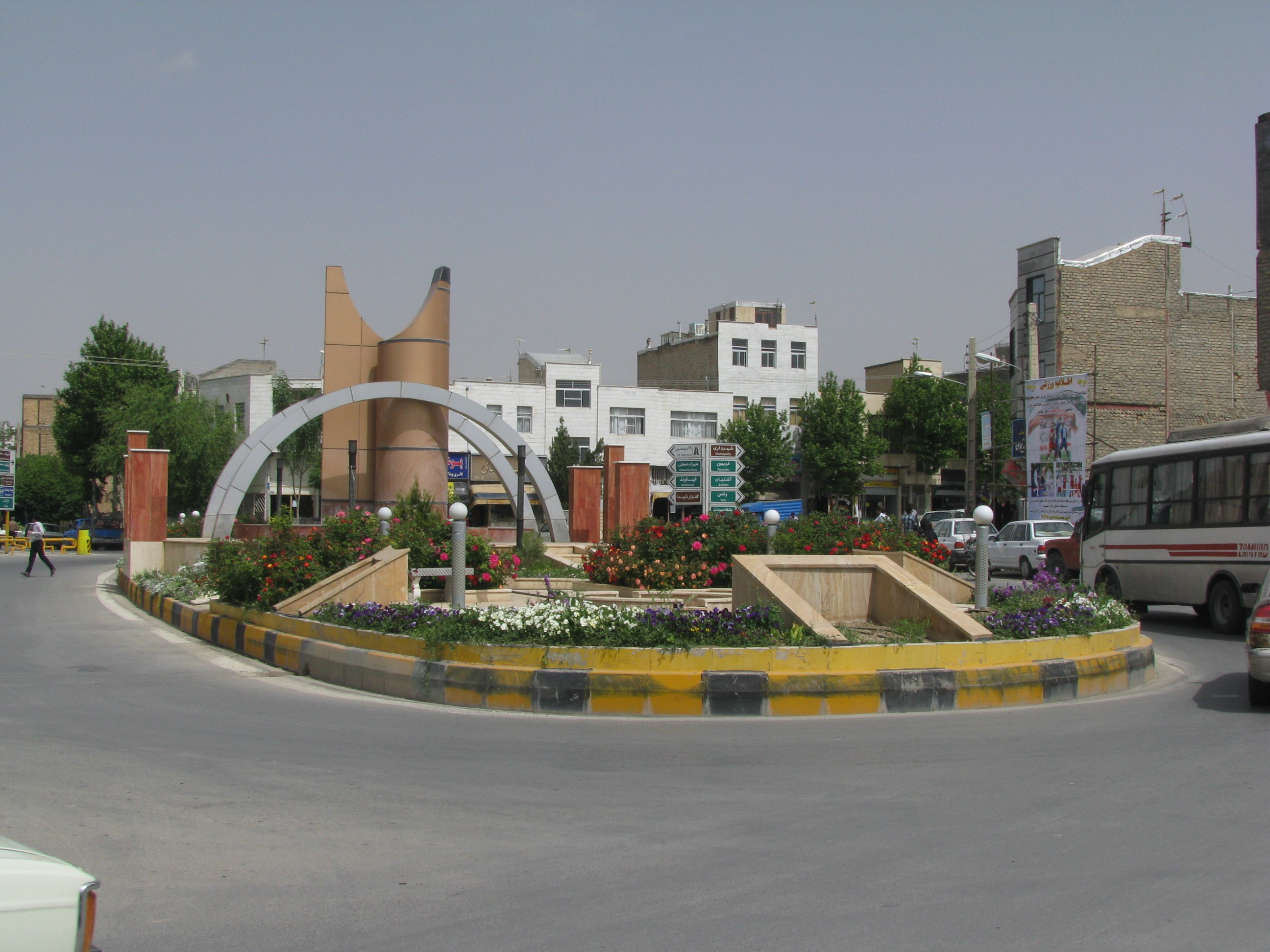
- Teacher Square in the city of Komijan

- Location of Komijan County in Markazi province (center left, purple)

- Location of Markazi province in Iran
- Coordinates: 34°46′N 49°21′E
- Country: Iran
- Province: Markazi
- Established: 2003
- Capital: Komijan
- Districts: Central, Milajerd

Population (2016)
  - Total: 36,441
- Time zone: UTC+3:30 (IRST)

Komijan County (Persian: شهرستان کمیجان) is in Markazi province, Iran. Its capital is the city of Komijan.

== History ==
In 2010, Vafs Rural District was created in the Central District, and Khenejin Rural District was separated from it in the establishment of Farahan County.

== Demographics ==
=== Language ===
Azerbaijanis, Persians and Tats are the largest ethnic groups in the county. They speak Azerbaijani, Persian and Tati.

=== Population ===
At the time of the 2006 National Census, the county's population was 45,296 in 11,539 households. The following census in 2011 counted 39,340 people in 11,164 households. The 2016 census measured the population of the county as 36,441 in 11,339 households.

=== Administrative divisions ===
Komijan County's population history and administrative structure over three consecutive censuses are shown in the following table.

Komijan County Population
Administrative Divisions	2006	2011	2016
Central District	26,749	22,899	21,186
Esfandan RD	9,074	4,888	4,372
Khenejin RD (Note: Transferred to Farahan County)	10,317		
Vafs RD		8,816	8,038
Komijan (city)	7,358	9,195	8,776
Milajerd District	18,547	16,441	15,255
Khosrow Beyk RD	6,398	4,058	3,540
Milajerd RD	3,221	3,026	2,427
Milajerd (city)	8,928	9,357	9,288
Total	45,296	39,340	36,441
RD = Rural District

== See also ==
Media related to Komijan County at Wikimedia Commons
