= Baharestan (disambiguation) =

Baharestan is the Iranian parliament building.

Baharestan (Persian: بهارستان), also rendered as Bahristan may also refer to:

== Places ==
=== Afghanistan ===
- Baharestan, Afghanistan, a village in Badakhshan Province

=== Iran ===
- Baharestan, Fars, a village
- Baharestan, Gilan, a village
- Baharestan, Isfahan, a city in Isfahan Province
- Baharestan Rural District, in Isfahan Province
- Baharestan, Rafsanjan, a village in Kerman Province
- Baharestan, Zarand, a village in Kerman Province
- Baharestan, Kurdistan, a village
- Baharestan, Ashtian, a village in Markazi Province
- Baharestan, Farahan, a village in Markazi Province
- Baharestan, Khondab, a village in Markazi Province
- Baharestan, Mazandaran, a village
- Baharestan, Razavi Khorasan, a village
- Baharestan, South Khorasan, a village
- Baharestan (district), a district of Tehran
- Baharestan County, a county in Tehran Province
- Baharestan Metro Station, a station in Tehran Metro Line 2

== Other uses ==
- Baharestan (book), a Persian book by Jami
- Baharestan (newspaper), an Iranian newspaper of the Fars region
- Baharestan Carpet, a style of Persian carpet
