= Chalab (disambiguation) =

Chalab is a village in Kurdistan Province, Iran.

Chalab or Chal Ab (Persian: چالاب) may also refer to:

- Jradzor, Armenia
- Chalab-e Bekr, Iran
- Chalab-e Olya, Iran
- Chalab-e Olya, Kermanshah, Iran
- Chalab-e Pain, Iran
- Chalab-e Sofla, Iran
- Chalab-e Sofla, Kermanshah, Iran
- Chal Ab Morad Ali, Iran
