= Qameshlu =

Qameshlu or Qomeshlu (Persian: قمشلو), also rendered as Qamishlu, may refer to:

- Qamishlu, East Azerbaijan
- Qomeshlu, East Azerbaijan
- Qomishlu, Isfahan Province
- Qameshlu, Kurdistan
- Qameshlu, Markazi
- Qameshlu, Qazvin
- Qameshlu, Tehran
- Qameshlu, West Azerbaijan
- Qamishlu, West Azerbaijan
- Qameshlu, Afshar, Zanjan Province
- Qameshlu, Sojas Rud, Zanjan Province
- Ghamishlu, Azerbaijan
