= Saruq =

Saruq may refer to:

- Saruq, Markazi, Iran
- Saruq, Razavi Khorasan, Iran
- Saruq District, in Iran
- Saruq Rural District (disambiguation), in Iran
- Saruq, Oman
