= Karkan =

Karkan or Karakan or Korkan (Persian: كركان) may refer to:

- Karkan, Gilan, Bandar_e Anzali
- Karkan, East Azerbaijan
- Karkan, Fars
- Karkan, Hamadan
- Karkan-e Olya, Lorestan Province
- Karkan, Markazi
- Karkan-e Bala, Markazi Province
- Karkan-e Pain, Markazi Province
