= Kamar Ab =

Kamar Ab or Kamarab (Persian: كمراب) may refer to:

- Kamarab, Kermanshah
- Kamar Ab, Khuzestan
- Kamar Ab, Markazi
