= Enaj =

Village in Markazi province, Iran

Enaj Persian: اناج
- Village
- Location within Iran
- Coordinates: 34°13′52″N 49°19′01″E
- Country: Iran
- Province: Markazi
- County: Khondab
- District: Qareh Chay
- Rural District: Enaj

Population (2016)
  - Total: 1,380
- Time zone: UTC+3:30 (IRST)

Enaj (Persian: اناج) (Note: Also romanized as Anāj and Enāj; also known as Shahrak-e Shahīd Rejā’ī) is a village in, and the capital of, Enaj Rural District in Qareh Chay District of Khondab County, Markazi province, Iran.

== Demographics ==
=== Population ===
At the time of the 2006 National Census, the village's population was 1,464 in 400 households, when it was in the former Khondab District of Arak County. The following census in 2011 counted 1,427 people in 411 households, by which time the district had been separated from the county in the establishment of Khondab County. The rural district was transferred to the new Qareh Chay District. The 2016 census measured the population of the village as 1,380 people in 436 households.
