= Gusheh-ye Sofla, Markazi =

Village in Markazi province, Iran

Gusheh-ye Sofla Persian: گوشه سفلي
- Village
- Location within Iran
- Coordinates: 34°11′57″N 49°17′00″E
- Country: Iran
- Province: Markazi
- County: Khondab
- District: Qareh Chay
- Rural District: Enaj

Population (2016)
  - Total: 182
- Time zone: UTC+3:30 (IRST)

Gusheh-ye Sofla (Persian: گوشه سفلي) (Note: Also romanized as Gūsheh-ye Soflá; also known as Gūsheh Pā’īn and Gūsheh-ye Pā’īn) is a village in Enaj Rural District of Qareh Chay District in Khondab County, Markazi province, Iran.

== Demographics ==
=== Population ===
At the time of the 2006 National Census, the village's population was 181 in 38 households, when it was in the former Khondab District of Arak County. The following census in 2011 counted 184 people in 43 households, by which time the district had been separated from the county in the establishment of Khondab County. The rural district was transferred to the new Qareh Chay District. The 2016 census measured the population of the village as 182 people in 49 households.
