= Hoseynabad-e Muqufeh =

Village in Markazi province, Iran

Hoseynabad-e Muqufeh Persian: حسين ابادموقوفه
- Village
- Location within Iran
- Coordinates: 34°26′16″N 49°07′28″E
- Country: Iran
- Province: Markazi
- County: Khondab
- District: Central
- Rural District: Deh Chal

Population (2016)
  - Total: 510
- Time zone: UTC+3:30 (IRST)

Hoseynabad-e Muqufeh (Persian: حسين ابادموقوفه) (Note: Also romanized as Ḩoseynābād-e Mūqūfeh; also known as Ḩoseynābād) is a village in Deh Chal Rural District of the Central District in Khondab County, Markazi province, Iran.

== Demographics ==
=== Population ===
At the time of the 2006 National Census, the village's population was 507 in 124 households, when it was in the former Khondab District of Arak County. The following census in 2011 counted 546 people in 142 households, by which time the district had been separated from the county in the establishment of Khondab County. The rural district was transferred to the new Central District. The 2016 census measured the population of the village as 510 people in 142 households.
