= Aliabad, Khondab =

Village in Markazi province, Iran

Aliabad Persian: علي اباد
- Village
- Location within Iran
- Coordinates: 34°25′57″N 49°05′57″E
- Country: Iran
- Province: Markazi
- County: Khondab
- District: Central
- Rural District: Deh Chal

Population (2016)
  - Total: 792
- Time zone: UTC+3:30 (IRST)

Aliabad (Persian: علي اباد) (Note: Also romanized as 'Alīābād) is a village in Deh Chal Rural District of the Central District in Khondab County, Markazi province, Iran.

== Demographics ==
=== Population ===
At the time of the 2006 National Census, the village's population was 943 in 234 households, when it was in the former Khondab District of Arak County. The following census in 2011 counted 883 people in 243 households, by which time the district had been separated from the county in the establishment of Khondab County. The rural district was transferred to the new Central District. The 2016 census measured the population of the village as 792 people in 251 households.
