= Qaleh-ye Azraj =

Village in Markazi province, Iran

Qaleh-ye Azraj Persian: قلعه ازرج
- Village
- Location within Iran
- Coordinates: 34°10′26″N 49°20′20″E
- Country: Iran
- Province: Markazi
- County: Khondab
- District: Qareh Chay
- Rural District: Enaj

Population (2016)
  - Total: 375
- Time zone: UTC+3:30 (IRST)

Qaleh-ye Azraj (Persian: قلعه ازرج) (Note: Also romanized as Qal‘eh-ye Azraj; also known as Qal‘eh, Qal‘eh Avzaj, Qal‘eh-ye Arzaj, and Qal‘eh-ye Tārvandī) is a village in Enaj Rural District of Qareh Chay District in Khondab County, Markazi province, Iran.

== Demographics ==
=== Population ===
At the time of the 2006 National Census, the village's population was 552 in 147 households, when it was in the former Khondab District of Arak County. The following census in 2011 counted 477 people in 137 households, by which time the district had been separated from the county in the establishment of Khondab County. The rural district was transferred to the new Qareh Chay District. The 2016 census measured the population of the village as 375 people in 125 households.
