= Qasemabad, Khondab =

Village in Markazi province, Iran

Qasemabad Persian: قاسماباد
- Village
- Location within Iran
- Coordinates: 34°34′39″N 49°02′26″E
- Country: Iran
- Province: Markazi
- County: Khondab
- District: Central
- Rural District: Deh Chal

Population (2016)
  - Total: 956
- Time zone: UTC+3:30 (IRST)

Qasemabad (Persian: قاسماباد) (Note: Also romanized as Qāsemābād; also known as Gultepe and Gūy Tappeh) is a village in Deh Chal Rural District of the Central District in Khondab County, Markazi province, Iran.

== Demographics ==
=== Population ===
At the time of the 2006 National Census, the village's population was 1,398 in 314 households, when it was in the former Khondab District of Arak County. The following census in 2011 counted 1,245 people in 321 households, by which time the district had been separated from the county in the establishment of Khondab County. The rural district was transferred to the new Central District. The 2016 census measured the population of the village as 956 people in 281 households.
