= Tur Gir =

Village in Markazi province, Iran

Tur Gir Persian: طورگير
- Village
- Location within Iran
- Coordinates: 34°17′20″N 49°13′07″E
- Country: Iran
- Province: Markazi
- County: Khondab
- District: Qareh Chay
- Rural District: Sang Sefid

Population (2016)
  - Total: 903
- Time zone: UTC+3:30 (IRST)

Tur Gir (Persian: طورگير) (Note: Also romanized as Ţūr Gīr and Tūr Gīr; also known as Qal‘eh Tūr Gīr) is a village in, and the capital of, Sang Sefid Rural District in Qareh Chay District of Khondab County, Markazi province, Iran.

== Demographics ==
=== Population ===
At the time of the 2006 National Census, the village's population was 918 in 232 households, when it was in the former Khondab District of Arak County. The following census in 2011 counted 949 people in 272 households, by which time the district had been separated from the county in the establishment of Khondab County. The rural district was transferred to the new Qareh Chay District. The 2016 census measured the population of the village as 903 people in 263 households.
