= Ostuh =

Village in Markazi province, Iran

Ostuh Persian: استوه
- Village
- Location within Iran
- Coordinates: 34°19′27″N 49°14′34″E
- Country: Iran
- Province: Markazi
- County: Khondab
- District: Qareh Chay
- Rural District: Sang Sefid

Population (2016)
  - Total: 2,082
- Time zone: UTC+3:30 (IRST)

Ostuh (Persian: استوه) (Note: Also romanized as Estooh, Estūh, and Ostūh; also known as Ustāf) is a village in Sang Sefid Rural District of Qareh Chay District in Khondab County, Markazi province, Iran.

== Demographics ==
=== Population ===
At the time of the 2006 National Census, the village's population was 2,363 in 623 households, when it was in the former Khondab District of Arak County. The following census in 2011 counted 2,312 people in 701 households, by which time the district had been separated from the county in the establishment of Khondab County. The rural district was transferred to the new Qareh Chay District. The 2016 census measured the population of the village as 2,082 people in 673 households.
