= Movak =

Village in Markazi province, Iran

Movak Persian: موک
- Village
- Location within Iran
- Coordinates: 34°13′03″N 49°16′02″E
- Country: Iran
- Province: Markazi
- County: Khondab
- District: Qareh Chay
- Rural District: Enaj

Population (2016)
  - Total: 82
- Time zone: UTC+3:30 (IRST)

Movak (Persian: موک) (Note: Also romanized as Mowak) is a village in Enaj Rural District of Qareh Chay District in Khondab County, Markazi province, Iran.

== Demographics ==
=== Population ===
At the time of the 2006 National Census, the village's population was 112 in 25 households, when it was in the former Khondab District of Arak County. The following census in 2011 counted 123 people in 25 households, by which time the district had been separated from the county in the establishment of Khondab County. The rural district was transferred to the new Qareh Chay District. The 2016 census measured the population of the village as 82 people in 22 households.
