= Mehr-e Sofla =

Village in Markazi province, Iran

Mehr-e Sofla Persian: مهرسفلي
- Village
- Location within Iran
- Coordinates: 34°16′44″N 49°17′21″E
- Country: Iran
- Province: Markazi
- County: Khondab
- District: Qareh Chay
- Rural District: Enaj

Population (2016)
  - Total: 2,128
- Time zone: UTC+3:30 (IRST)

Mehr-e Sofla (Persian: مهرسفلي) (Note: Also romanized as Mehr-e Soflá; formerly known as Mast-e Soflá; also known as Mast-e Pā’īn and Mast-i-Pain) is a village in Enaj Rural District of Qareh Chay District in Khondab County, Markazi province, Iran.

== Demographics ==
=== Population ===
At the time of the 2006 National Census, the village's population was 2,432 in 670 households, when it was in the former Khondab District of Arak County. The following census in 2011 counted 2,369 people in 716 households, by which time the district had been separated from the county in the establishment of Khondab County. The rural district was transferred to the new Qareh Chay District. The 2016 census measured the population of the village as 2,128 people in 690 households, the most populous in its rural district.
