= Gezerdar =

Village in Markazi province, Iran

Gezerdar Persian: گذردر
- Village
- Location within Iran
- Coordinates: 34°14′40″N 49°08′28″E
- Country: Iran
- Province: Markazi
- County: Khondab
- District: Qareh Chay
- Rural District: Sang Sefid

Population (2016)
  - Total: 196
- Time zone: UTC+3:30 (IRST)

Gezerdar (Persian: گذردر) (Note: Also romanized as Gozar Dar) is a village in Sang Sefid Rural District of Qareh Chay District in Khondab County, Markazi province, Iran.

== Demographics ==
=== Population ===
At the time of the 2006 National Census, the village's population was 303 in 73 households, when it was in the former Khondab District of Arak County. The following census in 2011 counted 270 people in 72 households, by which time the district had been separated from the county in the establishment of Khondab County. The rural district was transferred to the new Qareh Chay District. The 2016 census measured the population of the village as 196 people in 70 households.
