= Abbasabad-e Muqufeh =

Village in Markazi province, Iran

Abbasabad-e Muqufeh Persian: عباس ابادموقوفه
- Village
- Location within Iran
- Coordinates: 34°14′00″N 49°20′02″E
- Country: Iran
- Province: Markazi
- County: Khondab
- District: Qareh Chay
- Rural District: Enaj

Population (2016)
  - Total: 659
- Time zone: UTC+3:30 (IRST)

Abbasabad-e Muqufeh (Persian: عباس ابادموقوفه) (Note: Also romanized as Abbāsābād-e Mūqūfeh; also known as ‘Abbāsābād) is a village in Enaj Rural District of Qareh Chay District in Khondab County, Markazi province, Iran.

== Demographics ==
=== Population ===
At the time of the 2006 National Census, the village's population was 590 in 169 households, when it was in the former Khondab District of Arak County. The following census in 2011 counted 742 people in 227 households, by which time the district had been separated from the county in the establishment of Khondab County. The rural district was transferred to the new Qareh Chay District. The 2016 census measured the population of the village as 659 people in 225 households.
