= Gazeran, Khondab =

Village in Markazi province, Iran

Gazeran Persian: گازران
- Village
- Location within Iran
- Coordinates: 34°20′37″N 49°15′02″E
- Country: Iran
- Province: Markazi
- County: Khondab
- District: Central
- Rural District: Khondab

Population (2016)
  - Total: 1,446
- Time zone: UTC+3:30 (IRST)

Gazeran (Persian: گازران) (Note: Also romanized as Gāzerān, Gāzorān, and Gāzrān) is a village in Khondab Rural District of the Central District in Khondab County, Markazi province, Iran.

== Demographics ==
=== Population ===
At the time of the 2006 National Census, the village's population was 1,507 in 425 households, when it was in the former Khondab District of Arak County. The following census in 2011 counted 1,552 people in 442 households, by which time the district had been separated from the county in the establishment of Khondab County. The rural district was transferred to the new Central District. The 2016 census measured the population of the village as 1,446 people in 453 households, the most populous in its rural district.
