= Kureh Zar =

Village in Markazi province, Iran

Kureh Zar Persian: كوره زار
- Village
- Location within Iran
- Country: Iran
- Province: Markazi
- County: Khondab
- District: Qareh Chay
- Rural District: Enaj

Population (2016)
  - Total: 555
- Time zone: UTC+3:30 (IRST)

Kureh Zar (Persian: كوره زار) (Note: Also romanized as Kūreh Zār; also known as Kūreh Dar) is a village in Enaj Rural District of Qareh Chay District in Khondab County, Markazi province, Iran.

== Demographics ==
=== Population ===
At the time of the 2006 National Census, the village's population was 662 in 152 households, when it was in the former Khondab District of Arak County. The following census in 2011 counted 617 people in 165 households, by which time the district had been separated from the county in the establishment of Khondab County. The rural district was transferred to the new Qareh Chay District. The 2016 census measured the population of the village as 555 people in 170 households.
