= Khaneqah-e Olya, Markazi =

Village in Markazi province, Iran

Khaneqah-e Olya Persian: خانقاه عليا
- Village
- Location within Iran
- Coordinates: 34°15′15″N 49°20′59″E
- Country: Iran
- Province: Markazi
- County: Khondab
- District: Qareh Chay
- Rural District: Javersiyan

Population (2016)
  - Total: 1,031
- Time zone: UTC+3:30 (IRST)

Khaneqah-e Olya (Persian: خانقاه عليا) (Note: Also romanized as Khāneqāh-e ‘Olyā and Khānqāh-e ‘Olyā) is a village in Javersiyan Rural District (Note: Formerly Shara Rural District) of Qareh Chay District in Khondab County, Markazi province, Iran.

== Demographics ==
=== Population ===
At the time of the 2006 National Census, the village's population was 950 in 264 households, when it was in the former Khondab District of Arak County. The following census in 2011 counted 1,001 people in 308 households, by which time the district had been separated from the county in the establishment of Khondab County. The rural district was transferred to the new Qareh Chay District. The 2016 census measured the population of the village as 1,031 people in 333 households, the most populous in its rural district.
