= Aludar =

Village in Markazi province, Iran

Aludar Persian: الودر
- Village
- Location within Iran
- Coordinates: 34°11′55″N 49°13′11″E
- Country: Iran
- Province: Markazi
- County: Khondab
- District: Qareh Chay
- Rural District: Sang Sefid

Population (2016)
  - Total: 563
- Time zone: UTC+3:30 (IRST)

Aludar (Persian: الودر) (Note: Also romanized as Aloodar and Ālūdar; also known as Alī Dar and ‘Alīdar) is a village in Sang Sefid Rural District of Qareh Chay District in Khondab County, Markazi province, Iran.

== Demographics ==
=== Population ===
At the time of the 2006 National Census, the village's population was 655 in 148 households, when it was in the former Khondab District of Arak County. The following census in 2011 counted 673 people in 184 households, by which time the district had been separated from the county in the establishment of Khondab County. The rural district was transferred to the new Qareh Chay District. The 2016 census measured the population of the village as 563 people in 172 households.
