= Emamzadeh Deh Chal =

Village in Markazi province, Iran

Emamzadeh Deh Chal Persian: امامزاده دهچال
- Village
- Location within Iran
- Coordinates: 34°27′23″N 49°08′32″E
- Country: Iran
- Province: Markazi
- County: Khondab
- District: Central
- Rural District: Deh Chal

Population (2016)
  - Total: 392
- Time zone: UTC+3:30 (IRST)

Emamzadeh Deh Chal (Persian: امامزاده دهچال) (Note: Also romanized as Emāmzādeh Deh Chāl; also known as Emāmzādeh, Kalācha, and Qal‘ehcheh) is a village in Deh Chal Rural District of the Central District in Khondab County, Markazi province, Iran.

== Demographics ==
=== Population ===
At the time of the 2006 National Census, the village's population was 472 in 117 households, when it was in the former Khondab District of Arak County. The following census in 2011 counted 437 people in 113 households, by which time the district had been separated from the county in the establishment of Khondab County. The rural district was transferred to the new Central District. The 2016 census measured the population of the village as 392 people in 121 households.
