= Shahid, Markazi =

Village in Markazi province, Iran

Shahid Persian: شهيد
- Village
- Location within Iran
- Coordinates: 34°18′01″N 49°08′47″E
- Country: Iran
- Province: Markazi
- County: Khondab
- District: Qareh Chay
- Rural District: Sang Sefid

Population (2016)
  - Total: 283
- Time zone: UTC+3:30 (IRST)

Shahid (Persian: شهيد) (Note: Also romanized as Shahīd; also known as Gheshlagh Shahid and Qeshlāq-e Shahīd) is a village in Sang Sefid Rural District of Qareh Chay District in Khondab County, Markazi province, Iran.

== Demographics ==
=== Population ===
At the time of the 2006 National Census, the village's population was 439 in 88 households, when it was in the former Khondab District of Arak County. The following census in 2011 counted 440 people in 107 households, by which time the district had been separated from the county in the establishment of Khondab County. The rural district was transferred to the new Qareh Chay District. The 2016 census measured the population of the village as 283 people in 84 households.
