= Gheynarjeh =

Village in Markazi province, Iran

Gheynarjeh Persian: غينرجه
- Village
- Location within Iran
- Coordinates: 34°30′57″N 49°12′07″E
- Country: Iran
- Province: Markazi
- County: Khondab
- District: Central
- Rural District: Khondab

Population (2016)
  - Total: 811
- Time zone: UTC+3:30 (IRST)

Gheynarjeh (Persian: غينرجه) (Note: Also known as Qinerja) is a village in Khondab Rural District of the Central District in Khondab County, Markazi province, Iran.

== Demographics ==
=== Population ===
At the time of the 2006 National Census, the village's population was 801 in 199 households, when it was in the former Khondab District of Arak County. The following census in 2011 counted 853 people in 253 households, by which time the district had been separated from the county in the establishment of Khondab County. The rural district was transferred to the new Central District. The 2016 census measured the population of the village as 811 people in 234 households.
