= Deh-e Sadd =

Village in Markazi province, Iran

Deh-e Sadd Persian: ده سد
- Village
- Location within Iran
- Coordinates: 34°12′27″N 49°20′41″E
- Country: Iran
- Province: Markazi
- County: Khondab
- District: Qareh Chay
- Rural District: Javersiyan

Population (2016)
  - Total: 702
- Time zone: UTC+3:30 (IRST)

Deh-e Sadd (Persian: ده سد) (Note: Also romanized as Deh Sad) is a village in Javersiyan Rural District (Note: Formerly Shara Rural District) of Qareh Chay District in Khondab County, Markazi province, Iran.

== Demographics ==
=== Population ===
At the time of the 2006 National Census, the village's population was 843 in 258 households, when it was in the former Khondab District of Arak County. The following census in 2011 counted 845 people in 273 households, by which time the district had been separated from the county in the establishment of Khondab County. The rural district was transferred to the new Qareh Chay District. The 2016 census measured the population of the village as 702 people in 241 households.
