= Manizan, Markazi =

Village in Markazi province, Iran

Manizan Persian: مانيزان
- Village
- Location within Iran
- Coordinates: 34°11′16″N 49°20′24″E
- Country: Iran
- Province: Markazi
- County: Khondab
- District: Qareh Chay
- Rural District: Enaj

Population (2016)
  - Total: 986
- Time zone: UTC+3:30 (IRST)

Manizan (Persian: مانيزان) (Note: Also romanized as Mānīzān) is a village in Enaj Rural District of Qareh Chay District in Khondab County, Markazi province, Iran.

== Demographics ==
=== Population ===
At the time of the 2006 National Census, the village's population was 1,265 in 331 households, when it was in the former Khondab District of Arak County. The following census in 2011 counted 1,149 people in 341 households, by which time the district had been separated from the county in the establishment of Khondab County. The rural district was transferred to the new Qareh Chay District. The 2016 census measured the population of the village as 986 people in 330 households.
