= Sanavord =

Village in Markazi province, Iran

Sanavord Persian: سناورد
- Village
- Location within Iran
- Coordinates: 34°13′49″N 49°20′00″E
- Country: Iran
- Province: Markazi
- County: Khondab
- District: Qareh Chay
- Rural District: Enaj

Population (2016)
  - Total: 527
- Time zone: UTC+3:30 (IRST)

Sanavord (Persian: سناورد) (Note: Also romanized as Sanāvord; also known as Abbāsābād Sanābard, ‘Abbāsābād Sanāvord, and ‘Abbāsābād-e Sanāvord) is a village in Enaj Rural District of Qareh Chay District in Khondab County, Markazi province, Iran.

== Demographics ==
=== Population ===
At the time of the 2006 National Census, the village's population was 704 in 200 households, when it was in the former Khondab District of Arak County. The following census in 2011 counted 580 people in 170 households, by which time the district had been separated from the county in the establishment of Khondab County. The rural district was transferred to the new Qareh Chay District. The 2016 census measured the population of the village as 527 people in 170 households.
