= Shor Shor =

Shor Shor or Shar Shar or Sher Sher (Persian: شرشر) may refer to:

- Sher Sher, East Azerbaijan
- Shor Shor, Lorestan
- Shor Shor, Razavi Khorasan
- Shor and Shorshor, 1926 Soviet film
