= Dehnow, Markazi =

Village in Markazi province, Iran

Dehnow Persian: ده نو
- Village
- Location within Iran
- Coordinates: 34°25′41″N 49°10′23″E
- Country: Iran
- Province: Markazi
- County: Khondab
- District: Central
- Rural District: Khondab

Population (2016)
  - Total: 1,334
- Time zone: UTC+3:30 (IRST)

Dehnow (Persian: ده نو) is a village in Khondab Rural District of the Central District in Khondab County, Markazi province, Iran.

== Demographics ==
=== Population ===
At the time of the 2006 National Census, the village's population was 673 in 171 households, when it was in the former Khondab District of Arak County. The following census in 2011 counted 879 people in 201 households, by which time the district had been separated from the county in the establishment of Khondab County. The rural district was transferred to the new Central District. The 2016 census measured the population of the village as 1,334 people in 205 households.
