= Nasirabad, Khondab =

Village in Markazi province, Iran

Nasirabad Persian: نصيراباد
- Village
- Location within Iran
- Coordinates: 34°32′48″N 49°03′46″E
- Country: Iran
- Province: Markazi
- County: Khondab
- District: Central
- Rural District: Deh Chal

Population (2016)
  - Total: 301
- Time zone: UTC+3:30 (IRST)

Nasirabad (Persian: نصيراباد) (Note: Also romanized as Naşīrābād; also known as Nāşerābād and Nāşrābād) is a village in Deh Chal Rural District of the Central District in Khondab County, Markazi province, Iran.

== Demographics ==
=== Population ===
At the time of the 2006 National Census, the village's population was 428 in 84 households, when it was in the former Khondab District of Arak County. The following census in 2011 counted 348 people in 88 households, by which time the district had been separated from the county in the establishment of Khondab County. The rural district was transferred to the new Central District. The 2016 census measured the population of the village as 301 people in 87 households.
