= Qalibaf, Markazi =

Village in Markazi province, Iran

Qalibaf Persian: قاليباف
- Village
- Location within Iran
- Coordinates: 34°19′07″N 49°04′08″E
- Country: Iran
- Province: Markazi
- County: Khondab
- District: Central
- Rural District: Khondab

Population (2016)
  - Total: 574
- Time zone: UTC+3:30 (IRST)

Qalibaf (Persian: قاليباف) (Note: Also romanized as Qālībāf; also known as Ghalībaf) is a village in Khondab Rural District of the Central District in Khondab County, Markazi province, Iran.

== Demographics ==
=== Population ===
At the time of the 2006 National Census, the village's population was 690 in 153 households, when it was in the former Khondab District of Arak County. The following census in 2011 counted 618 people in 179 households, by which time the district had been separated from the county in the establishment of Khondab County. The rural district was transferred to the new Central District. The 2016 census measured the population of the village as 574 people in 176 households.
