= Suzan, Markazi =

Village in Markazi province, Iran

Suzan Persian: سوزان
- Village
- Location within Iran
- Coordinates: 34°16′15″N 49°26′08″E
- Country: Iran
- Province: Markazi
- County: Khondab
- District: Qareh Chay
- Rural District: Javersiyan

Population (2016)
  - Total: 647
- Time zone: UTC+3:30 (IRST)

Suzan (Persian: سوزان) (Note: Also romanized as Sūzān) is a village in Javersiyan Rural District (Note: Formerly Shara Rural District) of Qareh Chay District in Khondab County, Markazi province, Iran.

== Demographics ==
=== Population ===
At the time of the 2006 National Census, the village's population was 782 in 207 households, when it was in the former Khondab District of Arak County. The following census in 2011 counted 747 people in 215 households, by which time the district had been separated from the county in the establishment of Khondab County. The rural district was transferred to the new Qareh Chay District. The 2016 census measured the population of the village as 647 people in 209 households.
