= Aqdash, Khondab =

Village in Markazi province, Iran

Aqdash Persian: اقداش
- Village
- Location within Iran
- Coordinates: 34°15′01″N 49°10′20″E
- Country: Iran
- Province: Markazi
- County: Khondab
- District: Qareh Chay
- Rural District: Sang Sefid

Population (2016)
  - Total: 2,763
- Time zone: UTC+3:30 (IRST)

Aqdash (Persian: اقداش) (Note: Also romanized as Āqdāsh) is a village in Sang Sefid Rural District of Qareh Chay District in Khondab County, Markazi province, Iran.

== Demographics ==
=== Population ===
At the time of the 2006 National Census, the village's population was 2,535 in 630 households, when it was in the former Khondab District of Arak County. The following census in 2011 counted 2,767 people in 783 households, by which time the district had been separated from the county in the establishment of Khondab County. The rural district was transferred to the new Qareh Chay District. The 2016 census measured the population of the village as 2,763 people in 854 households, the most populous in its rural district.
