= Ayjan =

Village in Markazi province, Iran

Ayjan Persian: ايجان
- Village
- Location within Iran
- Coordinates: 34°16′57″N 49°18′01″E
- Country: Iran
- Province: Markazi
- County: Khondab
- District: Qareh Chay
- Rural District: Javersiyan

Population (2016)
  - Total: 938
- Time zone: UTC+3:30 (IRST)

Ayjan (Persian: ايجان) (Note: Also romanized as Ayjān and Eyjān; also known as Ejān, Ichān, and Īshān) is a village in Javersiyan Rural District (Note: Formerly Shara Rural District) of Qareh Chay District in Khondab County, Markazi province, Iran.

== Demographics ==
=== Population ===
At the time of the 2006 National Census, the village's population was 1,161 in 332 households, when it was in the former Khondab District of Arak County. The following census in 2011 counted 1,174 people in 346 households, by which time the district had been separated from the county in the establishment of Khondab County. The rural district was transferred to the new Qareh Chay District. The 2016 census measured the population of the village as 938 people in 315 households.
