= Sahmabad =

Village in Markazi province, Iran

Sahmabad Persian: سهم اباد
- Village
- Location within Iran
- Coordinates: 34°13′04″N 49°19′30″E
- Country: Iran
- Province: Markazi
- County: Khondab
- District: Qareh Chay
- Rural District: Enaj

Population (2016)
  - Total: 175
- Time zone: UTC+3:30 (IRST)

Sahmabad (Persian: سهم اباد) (Note: Also romanized as Sahmābād; also known as Qal‘eh-ye Salmābād and Salmābād) is a village in Enaj Rural District of Qareh Chay District in Khondab County, Markazi province, Iran.

== Demographics ==
=== Population ===
At the time of the 2006 National Census, the village's population was 197 in 50 households, when it was in the former Khondab District of Arak County. The following census in 2011 counted 164 people in 54 households, by which time the district had been separated from the county in the establishment of Khondab County. The rural district was transferred to the new Qareh Chay District. The 2016 census measured the population of the village as 175 people in 56 households.
