= Gusheh-ye Olya, Markazi =

Village in Markazi province, Iran

Gusheh-ye Olya Persian: گوشه عليا
- Village
- Location within Iran
- Coordinates: 34°11′22″N 49°15′37″E
- Country: Iran
- Province: Markazi
- County: Khondab
- District: Qareh Chay
- Rural District: Enaj

Population (2016)
  - Total: 414
- Time zone: UTC+3:30 (IRST)

Gusheh-ye Olya (Persian: گوشه عليا) (Note: Also romanized as Gūsheh-ye ‘Olyā; also known as Gūsheh Bālā and Gūsheh-ye Bālā) is a village in Enaj Rural District of Qareh Chay District in Khondab County, Markazi province, Iran.

== Demographics ==
=== Population ===
At the time of the 2006 National Census, the village's population was 661 in 152 households, when it was in the former Khondab District of Arak County. The following census in 2011 counted 569 people in 169 households, by which time the district had been separated from the county in the establishment of Khondab County. The rural district was transferred to the new Qareh Chay District. The 2016 census measured the population of the village as 414 people in 146 households.
