= Deh Chal =

Village in Markazi province, Iran

Deh Chal Persian: ده چال
- Village
- Location within Iran
- Coordinates: 34°27′54″N 49°07′15″E
- Country: Iran
- Province: Markazi
- County: Khondab
- District: Central
- Rural District: Deh Chal

Population (2016)
  - Total: 992
- Time zone: UTC+3:30 (IRST)

Deh Chal (Persian: ده چال) (Note: Also romanized as Deh Chāl) is a village in, and the capital of, Deh Chal Rural District in the Central District of Khondab County, Markazi province, Iran.

== Demographics ==
=== Population ===
At the time of the 2006 National Census, the village's population was 1,063 in 259 households, when it was in the former Khondab District of Arak County. The following census in 2011 counted 1,061 people in 308 households, by which time the district had been separated from the county in the establishment of Khondab County. The rural district was transferred to the new Central District. The 2016 census measured the population of the village as 992 people in 298 households.
