= Ebrahimabad, Khondab =

Ebrahimabad ابراهیم‌آباد
- Village
- Location within Iran
- Coordinates: 34°22′00″N 49°02′00″E
- Country: Iran
- Province: Markazi
- County: Khondab
- Bakhsh: Central
- Rural District: Deh Chal

Population (2006)
  - Total: 302
- Time zone: UTC+3:30 (IRST)
  - Summer (DST): UTC+4:30 (IRDT)

Ebrahimabad (Persian: ابراهیم‌آباد, also Romanized as Ebrāhīmābād; also known as Ebrāhīmābād-e Qareh Tappeh, Qarah Tappeh, and Qareh Tappeh) is a village in Deh Chal Rural District, in the Central District of Khondab County, Markazi Province, Iran. At the 2006 census, its population was 302, in 69 families.
