= Piazabad, Markazi =

Piazabad پيازاباد
- Village
- Location within Iran
- Coordinates: 34°34′08″N 49°05′21″E
- Country: Iran
- Province: Markazi
- County: Khondab
- Bakhsh: Central
- Rural District: Deh Chal

Population (2006)
  - Total: 57
- Time zone: UTC+3:30 (IRST)
  - Summer (DST): UTC+4:30 (IRDT)

Piazabad (Persian: پيازاباد, also Romanized as Pīāzābād and Peyāzābād) is a village in Deh Chal Rural District, in the Central District of Khondab County, Markazi Province, Iran. At the 2006 census, its population was 57, in 12 families.
