= Shor Shoreh, Markazi =

Shor Shoreh شرشره
- Village
- Location within Iran
- Coordinates: 34°12′14″N 49°09′47″E
- Country: Iran
- Province: Markazi
- County: Khondab
- Bakhsh: Qareh Chay
- Rural District: Sang Sefid

Population (2006)
  - Total: 199
- Time zone: UTC+3:30 (IRST)
  - Summer (DST): UTC+4:30 (IRDT)

Shor Shoreh (Persian: شرشره; also known as Showr Showreh and Shūr Shūreh) is a village in Sang Sefid Rural District, Qareh Chay District, Khondab County, Markazi Province, Iran. At the 2006 census, its population was 199, in 45 families.
