= Meysamabad =

Meysamabad (Persian: ميثم اباد) may refer to:

- Meysamabad, Kerman
- Meysamabad, Markazi
