= Kal Bid =

Kal Bid (Persian: كال بيد or كل بيد) may refer to:

- Kal Bid, Khuzestan (كل بيد - Kal Bīd)
- Kal Bid, Markazi (كل بيد - Kal Bīd)
