= Meysamabad, Markazi =

Meysamabad ميثم اباد
- Village
- Location within Iran
- Coordinates: 34°29′00″N 49°08′00″E
- Country: Iran
- Province: Markazi
- County: Khondab
- Bakhsh: Central
- Rural District: Khondab

Population (2006)
  - Total: 167
- Time zone: UTC+3:30 (IRST)
  - Summer (DST): UTC+4:30 (IRDT)

Meysamabad (Persian: ميثم اباد, also Romanized as Meys̄amābād) is a village in Khondab Rural District, in the Central District of Khondab County, Markazi Province, Iran. At the 2006 census, its population was 167, in 41 families.
