= Baharestan, Khondab =

Baharestan بهارستان
- Village
- Location within Iran
- Coordinates: 34°28′22″N 49°09′47″E
- Country: Iran
- Province: Markazi
- County: Khondab
- Bakhsh: Central
- Rural District: Khondab

Population (2006)
  - Total: 78
- Time zone: UTC+3:30 (IRST)
  - Summer (DST): UTC+4:30 (IRDT)

Baharestan (Persian: بهارستان, also Romanized as Bahārestān) is a village in Khondab Rural District, in the Central District of Khondab County, Markazi Province, Iran. At the 2006 census, its population was 78, in 18 families.
