= Karkan, Markazi =

Village in Markazi province, Iran

Karkan Persian: كركان
- Village
- Location within Iran
- Coordinates: 34°15′10″N 49°18′14″E
- Country: Iran
- Province: Markazi
- County: Khondab
- District: Qareh Chay
- Rural District: Enaj

Population (2016)
  - Total: 1,200
- Time zone: UTC+3:30 (IRST)

Karkan (Persian: كركان) (Note: Also romanized as Karkān; also known as Karkhān and Qareh Khān) is a village in Enaj Rural District of Qareh Chay District in Khondab County, Markazi province, Iran.

== Demographics ==
=== Population ===
At the time of the 2006 National Census, the village's population was 1,437 in 424 households, when it was in the former Khondab District of Arak County. The following census in 2011 counted 1,380 people in 437 households, by which time the district had been separated from the county in the establishment of Khondab County. The rural district was transferred to the new Qareh Chay District. The 2016 census measured the population of the village as 1,200 people in 410 households.
