= Shor Shoreh =

Shor Shoreh (Persian: شرشره), also rendered as Showr Showreh or Shur Shureh, may refer to:

- Shor Shoreh, Dorud, Lorestan Province
- Shur Shureh, Kuhdasht, Lorestan Province
- Shor Shoreh, Markazi
