= Mahmudiyeh, Markazi =

Village in Markazi province, Iran

Mahmudiyeh Persian: محموديه
- Village
- Location within Iran
- Country: Iran
- Province: Markazi
- County: Arak
- District: Saruq
- Rural District: Mashhad ol Kubeh

Population (2016)
  - Total: Below reporting threshold
- Time zone: UTC+3:30 (IRST)

Mahmudiyeh (Persian: محموديه) (Note: Also romanized as Maḩmūdīyeh) is a village in Mashhad ol Kubeh Rural District of Saruq District in Arak County, Markazi province, Iran.

== Demographics ==
=== Population ===
At the time of the 2006 National Census, the village's population was 14 in four households, when it was in Saruq Rural District of the Central District. The following census in 2011 counted 11 people in four households, by which time the rural district had been separated from the district in the formation of Saruq District. Mahmudiyeh was transferred to Mashhad ol Kubeh Rural District created in the new district. The 2016 census measured the population of the village as below the reporting threshold.
