= Furan, Iran =

Village in Markazi province, Iran

Furan Persian: فوران
- Village
- Location within Iran
- Coordinates: 34°28′57″N 49°05′09″E
- Country: Iran
- Province: Markazi
- County: Khondab
- District: Central
- Rural District: Deh Chal

Population (2016)
  - Total: 1,384
- Time zone: UTC+3:30 (IRST)

Furan (Persian: فوران) (Note: Also romanized as Fooran and Fūrān) is a village in Deh Chal Rural District of the Central District in Khondab County, Markazi province, Iran.

== Demographics ==
=== Population ===
At the time of the 2006 National Census, the village's population was 1,573 in 356 households, when it was in the former Khondab District of Arak County. The following census in 2011 counted 1,657 people in 441 households, by which time the district had been separated from the county in the establishment of Khondab County. The rural district was transferred to the new Central District. The 2016 census measured the population of the village as 1,384 people in 419 households, the most populous in its rural district.
