= Qameshlu, Markazi =

Qameshlu قمشلو
- Village
- Location within Iran
- Coordinates: 34°23′24″N 49°14′52″E
- Country: Iran
- Province: Markazi
- County: Khondab
- Bakhsh: Central
- Rural District: Khondab

Population (2006)
  - Total: 26
- Time zone: UTC+3:30 (IRST)
  - Summer (DST): UTC+4:30 (IRDT)

Qameshlu (Persian: قمشلو, also Romanized as Qameshlū) is a village in Khondab Rural District, in the Central District of Khondab County, Markazi Province, Iran. At the 2006 census, its population was 26, in 6 families.
