= Kharpahlu =

Kharpahlu خارپهلو
- Village
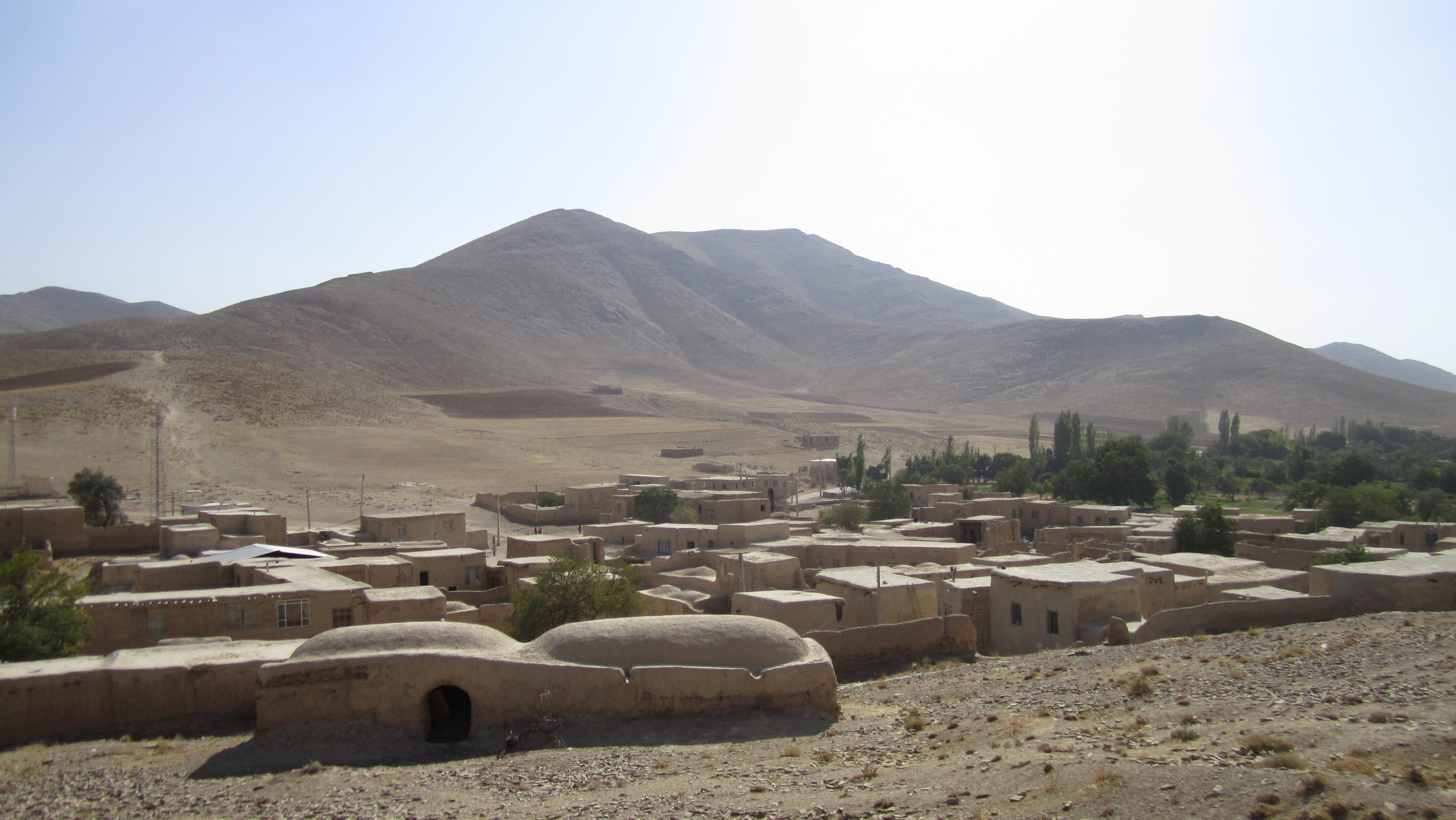
- village overview

- Location within Iran
- Coordinates: 34°15′56″N 49°31′30″E
- Country: Iran
- Province: Markazi
- County: Khondab
- Bakhsh: Qareh Chay
- Rural District: Javersiyan

Population (2006)
  - Total: 134
- Time zone: UTC+3:30 (IRST)
  - Summer (DST): UTC+4:30 (IRDT)

Kharpahlu (Persian: خارپهلو, also Romanized as Khārpahlū) is a village in Javersiyan Rural District, Qareh Chay District, Khondab County, Markazi Province, Iran. At the 2006 census, its population was 134, in 33 families.
