= Dizabad, Markazi =

Village in Markazi province, Iran

Dizabad Persian: ديزاباد
- Village
- Location within Iran
- Coordinates: 34°29′24″N 49°10′52″E
- Country: Iran
- Province: Markazi
- County: Khondab
- District: Central
- Rural District: Khondab

Population (2016)
  - Total: 1,122
- Time zone: UTC+3:30 (IRST)

Dizabad (Persian: ديزاباد) (Note: Also romanized as Dīzābād) is a village in Khondab Rural District of the Central District in Khondab County, Markazi province, Iran.

== Demographics ==
=== Population ===
At the time of the 2006 National Census, the village's population was 1,378 in 320 households, when it was in the former Khondab District of Arak County. The following census in 2011 counted 1,211 people in 316 households, by which time the district had been separated from the county in the establishment of Khondab County. The rural district was transferred to the new Central District. The 2016 census measured the population of the village as 1,122 people in 340 households.
