= Koleh Bid, Markazi =

Koleh Bid كله بيد
- Village
- Location within Iran
- Coordinates: 34°14′27″N 49°14′30″E
- Country: Iran
- Province: Markazi
- County: Khondab
- Bakhsh: Qareh Chay
- Rural District: Sang Sefid

Population (2006)
  - Total: 149
- Time zone: UTC+3:30 (IRST)
  - Summer (DST): UTC+4:30 (IRDT)

Koleh Bid (Persian: كله بيد, also Romanized as Koleh Bīd; also known as Kal Bīd, Kolabīd, and Kolbīd) is a village in Sang Sefid Rural District, Qareh Chay District, Khondab County, Markazi Province, Iran. At the 2006 census, its population was 149, in 33 families.
