= Hoseyniyeh, Markazi =

Village in Markazi province, Iran

Hoseyniyeh Persian: حسينيه
- Village
- Location within Iran
- Coordinates: 34°17′08″N 49°05′39″E
- Country: Iran
- Province: Markazi
- County: Khondab
- District: Qareh Chay
- Rural District: Sang Sefid

Population (2016)
  - Total: 408
- Time zone: UTC+3:30 (IRST)

Hoseyniyeh (Persian: حسينيه) (Note: Also romanized as Ḩoseynīyeh; formerly known as Ḩoseyn Gorg or Ḩoseyn-e Gorg; also known as Husain Kurk) is a village in Sang Sefid Rural District of Qareh Chay District in Khondab County, Markazi province, Iran.

== Demographics ==
=== Population ===
At the time of the 2006 National Census, the village's population was 517 in 114 households, when it was in the former Khondab District of Arak County. The following census in 2011 counted 462 people in 124 households, by which time the district had been separated from the county in the establishment of Khondab County. The rural district was transferred to the new Qareh Chay District. The 2016 census measured the population of the village as 408 people in 132 households.
