= Chizan =

Village in Markazi province, Iran

Chizan Persian: چيزان
- Village
- Location within Iran
- Coordinates: 34°32′09″N 49°07′22″E
- Country: Iran
- Province: Markazi
- County: Khondab
- District: Central
- Rural District: Deh Chal

Population (2016)
  - Total: 556
- Time zone: UTC+3:30 (IRST)

Chizan (Persian: چيزان) (Note: Also romanized as Chīzān and Chizān; also known as Chazān, Chezān, and Jazān) is a village in Deh Chal Rural District of the Central District in Khondab County, Markazi province, Iran.

== Demographics ==
=== Population ===
At the time of the 2006 National Census, the village's population was 803 in 184 households, when it was in the former Khondab District of Arak County. The following census in 2011 counted 683 people in 181 households, by which time the district had been separated from the county in the establishment of Khondab County. The rural district was transferred to the new Central District. The 2016 census measured the population of the village as 556 people in 179 households.
