= Godar, Iran =

Godar (Persian: گدار) may refer to:

- Godar-e Arbu, Hormozgan Province
- Godar Shah, Hormozgan Province
- Godar, Kermanshah
