= Dizabad =

Dizabad (Persian: ديزاباد) may refer to:

- Dizabad, Markazi
- Dizabad, Mazandaran

== See also ==
- Dizbad (disambiguation)
