= Kamar Ab, Markazi =

Kamar Ab كمراب
- Village
- Location within Iran
- Coordinates: 34°24′13″N 48°58′09″E
- Country: Iran
- Province: Markazi
- County: Khondab
- Bakhsh: Central
- Rural District: Deh Chal

Population (2006)
  - Total: 223
- Time zone: UTC+3:30 (IRST)
  - Summer (DST): UTC+4:30 (IRDT)

Kamar Ab (Persian: كمراب, also Romanized as Kamar Āb) is a village in Deh Chal Rural District, in the Central District of Khondab County, Markazi Province, Iran. At the 2006 census, its population was 223, in 47 families.
