= Chalab-e Sofla =

Chalab-e Sofla چالاب سفلي
- Village
- Location within Iran
- Coordinates: 34°16′12″N 49°07′16″E
- Country: Iran
- Province: Markazi
- County: Khondab
- Bakhsh: Qareh Chay
- Rural District: Sang Sefid

Population (2006)
  - Total: 62
- Time zone: UTC+3:30 (IRST)
  - Summer (DST): UTC+4:30 (IRDT)

Chalab-e Sofla (Persian: چالاب سفلي, also Romanized as Chālāb-e Soflá) is a village in Sang Sefid Rural District, Qareh Chay District, Khondab County, Markazi Province, Iran. At the 2006 census, its population was 62, in 16 families.
