= Chalab-e Olya =

Chalab-e Olya چالاب عليا
- Village
- Location within Iran
- Coordinates: 34°15′37″N 49°08′14″E
- Country: Iran
- Province: Markazi
- County: Khondab
- Bakhsh: Qareh Chay
- Rural District: Sang Sefid

Population (2006)
  - Total: 31
- Time zone: UTC+3:30 (IRST)
  - Summer (DST): UTC+4:30 (IRDT)

Chalab-e Olya (Persian: چالاب عليا, also Romanized as Chālāb-e ‘Olyā; also known as Chāl Āb) is a village in Sang Sefid Rural District, Qareh Chay District, Khondab County, Markazi Province, Iran. At the 2006 census, its population was 31, in 6 families.
