= Derman, Iran =

Village in Markazi province, Iran

Derman Persian: درمن
- Village
- Location within Iran
- Coordinates: 34°15′04″N 49°28′49″E
- Country: Iran
- Province: Markazi
- County: Khondab
- District: Qareh Chay
- Rural District: Javersiyan

Population (2016)
  - Total: 879
- Time zone: UTC+3:30 (IRST)

Derman (Persian: درمن) (Note: Also romanized as Dorman and Dormen; also known as Dīr Mār and Dīrmen) is a village in Javersiyan Rural District (Note: Formerly Shara Rural District) of Qareh Chay District in Khondab County, Markazi province, Iran.

== Demographics ==
=== Population ===
At the time of the 2006 National Census, the village's population was 1,238 in 345 households, when it was in the former Khondab District of Arak County. The following census in 2011 counted 1,094 people in 349 households, by which time the district had been separated from the county in the establishment of Khondab County. The rural district was transferred to the new Qareh Chay District. The 2016 census measured the population of the village as 879 people in 309 households.
