= Hocine =

Hocine is a masculine given name and surname of Arabic origin. Notable people with the name include:

== Given name ==
- Hocine Achiou (born 1979), Algerian footballer
- Hocine Aït Ahmed (1926–2015), Algerian politician
- Hocine Benmiloudi (1955–1981), Algerian footballer
- Hocine Bettir (born 1990), Algerian Paralympic powerlifter
- Hocine Chebaïki (born 1976), Belgian-Algerian footballer
- Hocine Cherhabil (born 1953), Algerian politician
- Hocine Daikhi, Algerian karateka
- Hocine Dehiri (born 2000), Algerian footballer
- Hocine Fenier (born 1983), Algerian footballer
- Hocine Gacemi (1974–2000), Algerian footballer
- Hocine Gherzouli, Algerian Paralympian shot putter
- Hocine Haciane (born 1986), Andorran swimmer
- Hocine Khalfi (1928–2011), American boxer
- Hocine Ledra (born 1956), Algerian handball player
- Hocine Metref (born 1984), Algerian footballer
- Hocine Mezali (born 1938), Algerian journalist and writer
- Hocine El Orfi (born 1987), Algerian footballer
- Hocine Rabet (born 1953), Algerian footballer
- Hocine Ragued (born 1983), French-Tunisian footballer
- Hocine Soltani (1972–2002), Algerian boxer
- Hocine Tafer (born 1955), French boxer
- Hocine al-Wartilani (1713–1779), Algerian Islamic scholar, Sufi master, and traveler
- Hocine Yahi (born 1960), Algerian footballer
- Hocine Zaourar (born 1952), Algerian photojournalist
- Hocine Zehouane (1935–2025), Algerian politician
- Hocine Ziani (born 1953), Algerian painter

== Surname ==
- Chakib Hocine (born 1991), Canadian footballer
- Youssef Hocine (born 1965), French fencer

== See also ==
- Beni Hocine, town and commune in Sétif Province in northeastern Algeria
- Houcine (disambiguation)
- Hussein (disambiguation)
