= Gomiz =

Village in Markazi province, Iran

Gomiz Persian: گميز
- Village
- Location within Iran
- Coordinates: 34°21′01″N 49°25′07″E
- Country: Iran
- Province: Markazi
- County: Arak
- District: Saruq
- Rural District: Mashhad ol Kubeh

Population (2016)
  - Total: Below reporting threshold
- Time zone: UTC+3:30 (IRST)

Gomiz (Persian: گميز) (Note: Also romanized as Gomīz; also known as Komīz) is a village in Mashhad ol Kubeh Rural District of Saruq District in Arak County, Markazi province, Iran.

== Demographics ==
=== Population ===
At the time of the 2006 National Census, the village's population was 21 in five households, when it was in Saruq Rural District of the Central District. The following censuses in 2011 and 2016 counted a population below the reporting threshold, by which time the rural district had been separated from the district in the formation of Saruq District. The village was transferred to Mashhad ol Kubeh Rural District created in the new district.
