= Masenabad =

Village in Markazi province, Iran

Masenabad Persian: مسن اباد
- Village
- Location within Iran
- Coordinates: 34°17′13″N 49°39′23″E
- Country: Iran
- Province: Markazi
- County: Arak
- District: Saruq
- Rural District: Mashhad ol Kubeh

Population (2016)
  - Total: 130
- Time zone: UTC+3:30 (IRST)

Masenabad (Persian: مسن اباد) (Note: Also romanized as Masanābād, Masenābād, and Masnābād) is a village in Mashhad ol Kubeh Rural District of Saruq District in Arak County, Markazi province, Iran.

== Demographics ==
=== Population ===
At the time of the 2006 National Census, the village's population was 139 in 32 households, when it was in Mashhad-e Miqan Rural District of the Central District. The following census in 2011 counted 146 people in 37 households, by which time the village had been separated from the district in the formation of Saruq District. Masenabad was transferred to Mashhad ol Kubeh Rural District created in the new district. The 2016 census measured the population of the village as 130 people in 38 households.
