= Mashhad ol Kubeh =

Village in Markazi province, Iran

Mashhad ol Kubeh Persian: مشهد الكوبه
- Village
- Location within Iran
- Coordinates: 34°21′05″N 49°36′48″E
- Country: Iran
- Province: Markazi
- County: Arak
- District: Saruq
- Rural District: Mashhad ol Kubeh

Population (2016)
  - Total: 1,386
- Time zone: UTC+3:30 (IRST)

Mashhad ol Kubeh (Persian: مشهدالكوبه) (Note: Also romanized as Mashhad al Kūbeh, Mashhad Alkoobeh, Mashhad ol Kūbeh, Mashhad-e Elkūbeh and Mashhadelkūbeh; also known as Mashal Kūbe and Mashhad al Gūbeh) is a village in, and the capital of, Mashhad ol Kubeh Rural District in Saruq District of Arak County, Markazi province, Iran.

== Demographics ==
=== Population ===
At the time of the 2006 National Census, the village's population was 1,658 in 435 households, when it was in Mashhad-e Miqan Rural District of the Central District. The following census in 2011 counted 1,581 people in 444 households, by which time the village had been separated from the district in the formation of Saruq District. Mashhad ol Kubeh was transferred to Mashhad ol Kubeh Rural District created in the new district. The 2016 census measured the population of the village as 1,386 people in 425 households, the most populous in its rural district.
