= Farsi Jan, Markazi =

Village in Markazi province, Iran

Farsi Jan Persian: فارسيجان
- Village
- Location within Iran
- Coordinates: 34°25′44″N 49°32′42″E
- Country: Iran
- Province: Markazi
- County: Arak
- District: Saruq
- Rural District: Saruq

Population (2016)
  - Total: 309
- Time zone: UTC+3:30 (IRST)

Farsi Jan (Persian: فارسيجان) (Note: Also romanized as Fārsī Jān) is a village in Saruq Rural District of Saruq District in Arak County, Markazi province, Iran.

== Demographics ==
=== Population ===
At the time of the 2006 National Census, the village's population was 391 in 122 households, when it was in the Central District. The following census in 2011 counted 337 people in 122 households, by which time the rural district had been separated from the district in the formation of Saruq District. The 2016 census measured the population of the village as 309 people in 126 households.
