= Navazen =

Village in Markazi province, Iran

Navazen Persian: نوازن
- Village
- Location within Iran
- Coordinates: 34°17′45″N 49°34′38″E
- Country: Iran
- Province: Markazi
- County: Arak
- District: Saruq
- Rural District: Mashhad ol Kubeh

Population (2016)
  - Total: 215
- Time zone: UTC+3:30 (IRST)

Navazen (Persian: نوازن) (Note: Also romanized as Navāzan and Navāzen; also known as Navazīn and Nūāzin) is a village in Mashhad ol Kubeh Rural District of Saruq District in Arak County, Markazi province, Iran.

== Demographics ==
=== Population ===
At the time of the 2006 National Census, the village's population was 245 in 70 households, when it was in Mashhad-e Miqan Rural District of the Central District. The following census in 2011 counted 217 people in 66 households, by which time the village had been separated from the district in the formation of Saruq District. Navazen was transferred to Mashhad ol Kubeh Rural District created in the new district. The 2016 census measured the population of the village as 215 people in 66 households.
