= Samar Dasht =

Samar Dasht (Persian: ثمردشت) may refer to:

- Samar Dasht, Khondab
- Samar Dasht, Tafresh
