= Hussein (disambiguation) =

Hussein is an Arabic given name.

Hussein, Hussain, Hossein, Hossen, Hossain, Huseyn, Husayn, Husein or Husain (or other Romanizations) may also refer to:

== Places ==
- Hussain, Iran, a village in West Azerbaijan Province, Iran
- Hoseyn-e Gorg, a village in Markazi Province, Iran
- Husayn, Yemen, a village in eastern Yemen
- Sheikh Hussein, holy Muslim site in Ethiopia

== See also ==
- Hussainia, a hall for Shia rituals
- Husain, a surname
- Husseini, a surname
- Hussein, An Entertainment, a novel by Patrick O'Brian
- Al Hussein (missile), Iraqi missile
- Mullá Husayn, first Letter of the Living in the Bábí movement
