= Javersiyan =

City in Markazi province, Iran

Javersiyan Persian: جاورسيان
- City
- Location within Iran
- Coordinates: 34°15′17″N 49°19′38″E
- Country: Iran
- Province: Markazi
- County: Khondab
- District: Qareh Chay
- Established as a city: 2009

Population (2016)
  - Total: 4,993
- Time zone: UTC+3:30 (IRST)

Javersiyan (Persian: جاورسيان) (Note: Also romanized as Jāvarsīān, Jāverseyān, Jāversīān, Jāversīyān, and Jāwar Siān) is a city in, and the capital of, Qareh Chay District in Khondab County, Markazi province, Iran. It also serves as the administrative center for Javersiyan Rural District. (Note: Formerly Shara Rural District)

== Demographics ==
=== Population ===
At the time of the 2006 National Census, Javersiyan's population was 4,573 in 1,275 households, when it was a village in Javersiyan Rural District of the former Khondab District in Arak County. The following census in 2011 counted 4,726 people in 1,486 households, by which time the district had been separated from the county in the establishment of Khondab County. The rural district was transferred to the new Qareh Chay District, and Javersiyan had been converted to a city. The 2016 census measured the population of the city as 4,993 people in 1,640 households.
