= Moshkan, Markazi =

Village in Markazi province, Iran

Moshkan Persian: مشكان
- Village
- Location within Iran
- Coordinates: 34°20′17″N 49°37′42″E
- Country: Iran
- Province: Markazi
- County: Arak
- District: Saruq
- Rural District: Mashhad ol Kubeh

Population (2016)
  - Total: 83
- Time zone: UTC+3:30 (IRST)

Moshkan (Persian: مشكان) (Note: Also romanized as Moshkān) is a village in Mashhad ol Kubeh Rural District of Saruq District in Arak County, Markazi province, Iran.

== Demographics ==
=== Population ===
At the time of the 2006 National Census, the village's population was 87 in 25 households, when it was in Mashhad-e Miqan Rural District of the Central District. The following census in 2011 counted 86 people in 30 households, by which time the village had been separated from the district in the formation of Saruq District. Moshkan was transferred to Mashhad ol Kubeh Rural District created in the new district. The 2016 census measured the population of the village as 83 people in 28 households.
