= Jerya =

Jerya (Persian: جريا) may refer to:

- Jaria
- Jiria
