= Jazan =

Jazan or Jizan may refer to:

== Iran ==
- Jazan, Alborz
- Jazan, Isfahan
- Jazan, Markazi
- Jazan, Semnan

== Saudi Arabia ==
- Jizan, a city
- Jazan Province
- Jazan University
