= Vazirabad, Markazi =

Village in Markazi province, Iran

Vazirabad Persian: وزيراباد
- Village
- Location within Iran
- Coordinates: 34°17′34″N 49°38′43″E
- Country: Iran
- Province: Markazi
- County: Arak
- District: Saruq
- Rural District: Mashhad ol Kubeh

Population (2016)
  - Total: 220
- Time zone: UTC+3:30 (IRST)

Vazirabad (Persian: وزيراباد) (Note: Also romanized as Vazīrābād and Wazīrābād) is a village in Mashhad ol Kubeh Rural District of Saruq District in Arak County, Markazi province, Iran.

== Demographics ==
=== Population ===
At the time of the 2006 National Census, the village's population was 254 in 67 households, when it was in Mashhad-e Miqan Rural District of the Central District. The following census in 2011 counted 246 people in 77 households, by which time the village had been separated from the district in the formation of Saruq District. Vazirabad was transferred to Mashhad ol Kubeh Rural District created in the new district. The 2016 census measured the population of the village as 220 people in 68 households.
