= Mashhad ol Kubeh Rural District =

Rural district in Markazi province, Iran

Mashhad ol Kubeh Rural District Persian: دهستان مشهد الکوبه
- Rural District
- Location within Iran
- Coordinates: 34°19′N 49°33′E
- Country: Iran
- Province: Markazi
- County: Arak
- District: Saruq
- Established: 2007
- Capital: Mashhad ol Kubeh

Population (2016)
  - Total: 2,980
- Time zone: UTC+3:30 (IRST)

Mashhad ol Kubeh Rural District (Persian: دهستان مشهد الکوبه) is in Saruq District of Arak County, Markazi province, Iran. Its capital is the village of Mashhad ol Kubeh.

== History ==
In 2007, Saruq Rural District was separated from the Central District in the formation of Saruq District, and Mashhad ol Kubeh Rural District was created in new district.

== Demographics ==
=== Population ===
At the time of the 2011 National Census, the rural district's population was 3,264 in 977 households. The 2016 census measured the population of the rural district as 2,980 in 933 households. The most populous of its 17 villages was Mashhad ol Kubeh, with 1,386 people.

=== Other villages in the rural district ===
- Gomiz
- Mahmudiyeh
- Masenabad
- Michan
- Moshkan
- Navazen
- Vazirabad
