= Tur, Markazi =

Village in Markazi province, Iran

Tur Persian: طور
- Village
- Location within Iran
- Coordinates: 34°23′47″N 49°26′20″E
- Country: Iran
- Province: Markazi
- County: Arak
- District: Saruq
- Rural District: Saruq

Population (2016)
  - Total: 854
- Time zone: UTC+3:30 (IRST)

Tur (Persian: طور) (Note: Also romanized as Toor and Ţūr) is a village in Saruq Rural District of Saruq District in Arak County, Markazi province, Iran.

== Demographics ==
=== Population ===
At the time of the 2006 National Census, the village's population was 845 in 212 households, when it was in the Central District. The following census in 2011 counted 867 people in 247 households, by which time the rural district had been separated from the district in the formation of Saruq District. The 2016 census measured the population of the village as 854 people in 242 households.
