= Michan =

Village in Markazi province, Iran

Michan Persian: ميچان
- Village
- Location within Iran
- Coordinates: 34°18′58″N 49°37′48″E
- Country: Iran
- Province: Markazi
- County: Arak
- District: Saruq
- Rural District: Mashhad ol Kubeh

Population (2016)
  - Total: 935
- Time zone: UTC+3:30 (IRST)

Michan (Persian: ميچان) (Note: Also romanized as Mīchān) is a village in Mashhad ol Kubeh Rural District of Saruq District in Arak County, Markazi province, Iran.

== Demographics ==
=== Population ===
At the time of the 2006 National Census, the village's population was 924 in 269 households, when it was in Mashhad-e Miqan Rural District of the Central District. The following census in 2011 counted 956 people in 313 households, by which time the village had been separated from the district in the formation of Saruq District. Michan was transferred to Mashhad ol Kubeh Rural District created in the new district. The 2016 census measured the population of the village as 935 people in 301 households.
