= Qatar-e Aghaj-e Sofla =

Village in Markazi province, Iran

Qatar-e Aghaj-e Sofla Persian: قطاراغاج سفلي
- Village
- Location within Iran
- Coordinates: 34°26′17″N 49°25′25″E
- Country: Iran
- Province: Markazi
- County: Arak
- District: Saruq
- Rural District: Saruq

Population (2016)
  - Total: 189
- Time zone: UTC+3:30 (IRST)

Qatar-e Aghaj-e Sofla (Persian: قطاراغاج سفلي) (Note: Also romanized as Qaţār-e Āghāj-e Soflá; also known as Ghatar Aghaj, Qaţār Āghāj, and Qāţerqāj) is a village in Saruq Rural District of Saruq District in Arak County, Markazi province, Iran.

== Demographics ==
=== Population ===
At the time of the 2006 National Census, the village's population was 228 in 53 households, when it was in the Central District. The following census in 2011 counted 234 people in 62 households, by which time the rural district had been separated from the district in the formation of Saruq District. The 2016 census measured the population of the village as 189 people in 53 households.
