= Qaleh-ye Arjanavand =

Village in Markazi province, Iran

Qaleh-ye Arjanavand Persian: قلعه ارجناوند
- Village
- Location within Iran
- Coordinates: 34°22′31″N 49°25′02″E
- Country: Iran
- Province: Markazi
- County: Arak
- District: Saruq
- Rural District: Saruq

Population (2016)
  - Total: 326
- Time zone: UTC+3:30 (IRST)

Qaleh-ye Arjanavand (Persian: قلعه ارجناوند) (Note: Also romanized as Qal‘eh-ye Arjanāvand and Qal‘eh-ye Arjenāvand; also known as Ghal‘eh Arjanavand and Qal‘eh Arjawand) is a village in Saruq Rural District of Saruq District in Arak County, Markazi province, Iran.

== Demographics ==
=== Population ===
At the time of the 2006 National Census, the village's population was 462 in 99 households, when it was in the Central District. The following census in 2011 counted 387 people in 118 households, by which time the rural district had been separated from the district in the formation of Saruq District. The 2016 census measured the population of the village as 326 people in 103 households.
