= Derman =

Derman may refer to:

- Cyrus Derman (1925-2011), American mathematician
- Emanuel Derman (born 1946), South African financial mathematician
- Vergie Derman (born 1942), British ballet dancer
- Derman (monastery), an Orthodox monastery affiliated with Ostroh Academy
- Derman (film), a 2008 Turkish-language film featuring Cengiz Küçükayvaz
- Derman, Iran, a village in Markazi Province, Iran
- Derman Druha, a village in Rivne Oblast, Ukraine
