= Kalagh Neshin =

Kalagh Neshin (Persian: كلاغ نشين) may refer to:

- Kalagh Neshin, Markazi
- Kalagh Neshin, Qom
