= Piazabad =

Piazabad or Piyazabad or Piyaz Abad or Peyazabad (Persian: پيازاباد) may refer to:

- Piazabad, Ilam
- Piazabad, Markazi
