= Gavjellu =

Village in Markazi province, Iran

Gavjellu Persian: گاوجلو
- Village
- Location within Iran
- Coordinates: 34°28′38″N 49°19′00″E
- Country: Iran
- Province: Markazi
- County: Arak
- District: Saruq
- Rural District: Saruq

Population (2016)
  - Total: 103
- Time zone: UTC+3:30 (IRST)

Gavjellu (Persian: گاوجلو) (Note: Also romanized as Gāv Jelow and Gāvjellū; also known as Gāv Chelū, Gav Jelo, Jūjalū, and Kūh Jālū) is a village in Saruq Rural District of Saruq District in Arak County, Markazi province, Iran.

== Demographics ==
=== Population ===
At the time of the 2006 National Census, the village's population was 143 in 32 households, when it was in the Central District. The following census in 2011 counted 121 people in 33 households, by which time the rural district had been separated from the district in the formation of Saruq District. The 2016 census measured the population of the village as 103 people in 31 households.
