= Lenjab-e Sofla =

Village in Markazi province, Iran

Lenjab-e Sofla Persian: لنجاب سفلي
- Village
- Location within Iran
- Coordinates: 34°25′37″N 49°17′32″E
- Country: Iran
- Province: Markazi
- County: Arak
- District: Saruq
- Rural District: Saruq

Population (2016)
  - Total: 72
- Time zone: UTC+3:30 (IRST)

Lenjab-e Sofla (Persian: لنجاب سفلي) (Note: Also romanized as Lenjāb-e Soflá; also known as Lanjāb, Lanjāb-e Pā’īn, and Lanjab-i-Pāīn) is a village in Saruq Rural District of Saruq District in Arak County, Markazi province, Iran.

== Demographics ==
=== Population ===
At the time of the 2006 National Census, the village's population was 64 in 16 households, when it was in the Central District. The following census in 2011 counted 60 people in 17 households, by which time the rural district had been separated from the district in the formation of Saruq District. The 2016 census measured the population of the village as 72 people in 20 households.
