= Jamabad =

Village in Markazi province, Iran

Jamabad Persian: جام اباد
- Village
- Location within Iran
- Coordinates: 34°28′30″N 49°23′09″E
- Country: Iran
- Province: Markazi
- County: Arak
- District: Saruq
- Rural District: Saruq

Population (2016)
  - Total: Below reporting threshold
- Time zone: UTC+3:30 (IRST)

Jamabad (Persian: جام اباد) (Note: Also romanized as Jāmābād and Jamābād) is a village in Saruq Rural District of Saruq District in Arak County, Markazi province, Iran.

== Demographics ==
=== Population ===
At the time of the 2006 National Census, the village's population was 11 in four households, when it was in the Central District. The following censuses in 2011 and 2016 counted a population below the reporting threshold, by which time the rural district had been separated from the district in the formation of Saruq District.
