= Furan (disambiguation) =

Furan may refer to:

- Furan, the chemical industrial compound
- Polychlorinated dibenzofurans, an unintentional contaminant byproduct of furans
- Furan (river) in France
- Furan, Iran, a village in Markazi Province, Iran
- Nitrofurantoin, by the trade name Furan
