= Karkan-e Bala =

Village in Markazi province, Iran

Karkan-e Bala Persian: كركان بالا
- Village
- Location within Iran
- Coordinates: 34°24′38″N 49°31′29″E
- Country: Iran
- Province: Markazi
- County: Arak
- District: Saruq
- Rural District: Saruq

Population (2016)
  - Total: 55
- Time zone: UTC+3:30 (IRST)

Karkan-e Bala (Persian: كركان بالا) (Note: Also romanized as Karakān-e Bāla and Karkān-e Bālā; also known as Garakān, Garakān-e ‘Olyā, and Karkān-e ‘Olyā) is a village in Saruq Rural District of Saruq District in Arak County, Markazi province, Iran.

== Demographics ==
=== Population ===
At the time of the 2006 National Census, the village's population was 76 in 26 households, when it was in the Central District. The following census in 2011 counted 81 people in 30 households, by which time the rural district had been separated from the district in the formation of Saruq District. The 2016 census measured the population of the village as 55 people in 24 households.
