= Kalagh Neshin, Markazi =

Village in Markazi province, Iran

Kalagh Neshin Persian: كلاغ نشين
- Village
- Location within Iran
- Coordinates: 34°21′34″N 49°30′08″E
- Country: Iran
- Province: Markazi
- County: Arak
- District: Saruq
- Rural District: Saruq

Population (2016)
  - Total: 291
- Time zone: UTC+3:30 (IRST)

Kalagh Neshin (Persian: كلاغ نشين) (Note: Also romanized as Kalāgh Neshīn) is a village in Saruq Rural District of Saruq District in Arak County, Markazi province, Iran.

== Demographics ==
=== Population ===
At the time of the 2006 National Census, the village's population was 304 in 70 households, when it was in the Central District. The following census in 2011 counted 314 people in 84 households, by which time the rural district had been separated from the district in the formation of Saruq District. The 2016 census measured the population of the village as 291 people in 87 households.
