= Saruq Rural District =

Saruq Rural District (Persian: دهستان ساروق) may refer to:

- Saruq Rural District (Markazi Province)
- Saruq Rural District (Takab County), West Azerbaijan province
