= Dizbad =

Dizbad (Persian: ديزباد) may refer to:

- Dizbad-e Olya
- Dizbad-e Sofla

== See also ==
- Dizabad (disambiguation)
