= Bahadorestan =

Village in Markazi province, Iran

Bahadorestan Persian: بهادرستان
- Village
- Location within Iran
- Coordinates: 34°24′41″N 49°24′44″E
- Country: Iran
- Province: Markazi
- County: Arak
- District: Saruq
- Rural District: Saruq

Population (2016)
  - Total: 291
- Time zone: UTC+3:30 (IRST)

Bahadorestan (Persian: بهادرستان) (Note: Also romanized as Bahādorestān; also known as Bādāristān, Bahārestān, and Bahristān) is a village in Saruq Rural District of Saruq District in Arak County, Markazi province, Iran.

== Demographics ==
=== Population ===
At the time of the 2006 National Census, the village's population was 477 in 116 households, when it was in the Central District. The following census in 2011 counted 440 people in 123 households, by which time the rural district had been separated from the district in the formation of Saruq District. The 2016 census measured the population of the village as 291 people in 102 households.
