= Jiria =

Village in Markazi province, Iran

Jiria Persian: جيريا
- Village
- Location within Iran
- Coordinates: 34°25′21″N 49°22′36″E
- Country: Iran
- Province: Markazi
- County: Arak
- District: Saruq
- Rural District: Saruq

Population (2016)
  - Total: 2,462
- Time zone: UTC+3:30 (IRST)

Jiria (Persian: جيريا) (Note: Also Romanized as Jirya and Jīryā; also known locally as Gīryā) is a village in Saruq Rural District of Saruq District in Arak County, Markazi province, Iran.

== Demographics ==
=== Population ===
At the time of the 2006 National Census, the village's population was 2,841 in 746 households, when it was in the Central District. The following census in 2011 counted 2,726 people in 810 households, by which time the rural district had been separated from the district in the formation of Saruq District. The 2016 census measured the population of the village as 2,462 people in 793 households. It was the most populous village in its rural district.
