= Enaj Rural District =

Rural district in Markazi province, Iran

Enaj Rural District Persian: دهستان اناج
- Rural District
- Location within Iran
- Coordinates: 34°14′N 49°17′E
- Country: Iran
- Province: Markazi
- County: Khondab
- District: Qareh Chay
- Established: 1987
- Capital: Enaj

Population (2016)
  - Total: 9,956
- Time zone: UTC+3:30 (IRST)

Enaj Rural District (Persian: دهستان اناج) is in Qareh Chay District of Khondab County, Markazi province, Iran. Its capital is the village of Enaj.

== Demographics ==
=== Population ===
At the time of the 2006 National Census, the rural district's population (as a part of the former Khondab District in Arak County) was 11,706 in 3,129 households. There were 11,224 inhabitants in 3,310 households at the following census of 2011, by which time the district had been separated from the county in the establishment of Khondab County. The rural district was transferred to the new Qareh Chay District. The 2016 census measured the population of the rural district as 9,956 in 3,219 households. The most populous of its 13 villages was Mehr-e Sofla, with 2,128 people.

=== Other villages in the rural district ===
- Abbasabad-e Muqufeh
- Gusheh-ye Olya
- Gusheh-ye Sofla
- Karkan
- Kureh Zar
- Manizan
- Mehr-e Olya
- Movak
- Qaleh-ye Azraj
- Sahmabad
- Sanavord
