= Karkan-e Pain =

Village in Markazi province, Iran

Karkan-e Pain Persian: كركان پائين
- Village
- Location within Iran
- Coordinates: 34°24′54″N 49°31′52″E
- Country: Iran
- Province: Markazi
- County: Arak
- District: Saruq
- Rural District: Saruq

Population (2016)
  - Total: 244
- Time zone: UTC+3:30 (IRST)

Karkan-e Pain (Persian: كركان پائين) (Note: Also romanized as Karakān-Pā’īn and Karkān-e Pā’īn; also known as Garakān-e Soflá and Karkān-e Soflá) is a village in Saruq Rural District of Saruq District in Arak County, Markazi province, Iran.

== Demographics ==
=== Population ===
At the time of the 2006 National Census, the village's population was 333 in 79 households, when it was in the Central District. The following census in 2011 counted 280 people in 81 households, by which time the rural district had been separated from the district in the formation of Saruq District. The 2016 census measured the population of the village as 244 people in 74 households.
