= Houcine =

Houcine is a masculine given name and surname of Arabic origin. Notable people with the name include:

== Given name ==
- Houcine Abassi (born 1947), Tunisian unionist
- Houcine Anafal (1952–2012), Moroccan footballer
- Houcine Benayada (born 1992), Algerian footballer
- Houcine Bennoui (born 1989), French Muay Thai kickboxer
- Houcine Camara (born 1980), French singer
- Houcine Dimassi (1948–2025), Tunisian politician
- Houcine Slaoui (1918–1951), Moroccan singer and composer
- Houcine Toulali (1924–1998), Moroccan writer and singer
- Houcine Zidoune (born 1990), Moroccan footballer

== Surname ==
- Khaled Houcine (born 1990), Tunisian sprint canoeist

== See also ==
- Hocine (disambiguation)
- Hussein
