= Qamishlu, West Azerbaijan =

Qamishlu قميش لو
- Village
- Location within Iran
- Coordinates: 36°57′18″N 46°39′28″E
- Country: Iran
- Province: West Azerbaijan
- County: Miandoab
- Bakhsh: Baruq
- Rural District: Ajorluy-ye Sharqi

Population (2006)
  - Total: 82
- Time zone: UTC+3:30 (IRST)
  - Summer (DST): UTC+4:30 (IRDT)

Qamishlu (Persian: قميش لو, also Romanized as Qamīshlū; also known as Qameshlū) is a village in Ajorluy-ye Sharqi Rural District, Baruq District, Miandoab County, West Azerbaijan Province, Iran. At the 2006 census, its population was 82, in 18 families.
