= Husayn, Yemen =

Coordinates: 16°07′N 49°08′E

- Interactive map of Husayn, Yemen
- Country: Yemen
- Governorate: Hadhramaut
- Time zone: UTC+3 (Yemen Standard Time)

Husayn, Yemen is a village in eastern Yemen. It is located in the Hadhramaut Governorate.
