= Baharestan, Rafsanjan =

Baharestan بهارستان
- Village
- Location within Iran
- Coordinates: 30°28′54″N 56°05′54″E
- Country: Iran
- Province: Kerman
- County: Rafsanjan
- Bakhsh: Central
- Rural District: Qasemabad

Population (2006)
  - Total: 25
- Time zone: UTC+3:30 (IRST)
  - Summer (DST): UTC+4:30 (IRDT)

Baharestan (Persian: بهارستان, also Romanized as Bahārestān) is a village in Qasemabad Rural District, in the Central District of Rafsanjan County, Kerman Province, Iran. At the 2006 census, its population was 25, in 7 families.
