= Baharestan (newspaper) =

Iranian newspaper in the Fars region

- Type: Newspaper
- Founder: Habibollah Noubakht
- Founded: 1920
- Language: Persian
- City: Shiraz
- Country: Iran

Baharestan (Persian: بهارستان lit. "The Spring Garden") is an Iranian newspaper in the Fars region. The Concessionaire of this newspaper was Habibollah Noubakht and it was published in Shiraz since 1920.

== See also ==
- List of magazines and newspapers of Fars
