= Hocine al-Wartilani =

Algerian Sufi Saint

Algerian Sufi saint al-Ḥusayn ibn Muḥammad al-Saʿīd al- Warṯīlānī

Personal life
- Born: 1713 Sétif
- Died: 1779 (aged 65–66)
- Region: Algeria
- Main interest(s): Kalam, Sufism, Aqida, Tafsir, Hadith, Fiqh, Mathematics, Grammar
- Notable works: Nuzhat al-Andhār fī Faḍl ʿIlm al-Tārīkh wa-l-Akhbār (Rihla); Several Sufi and religious commentaries (shurūḥ), including works relating to the tradition of Yahyā al-Aydlī

Religious life
- Religion: Islam
- Denomination: Sunni
- Jurisprudence: Maliki

Muslim leader
- Influenced by: Yahyā al-Aydlī

al-Ḥusayn ibn Muḥammad al-Saʿīd al-Wartīlānī (Arabic: الحسين بن محمد السعيد الورثيلاني), commonly known as Hocine al-Wartilani, was an Algerian Islamic scholar, Sufi master and traveller of the 18th century during the Ottoman era. He is best known for his travel account Nuzhat al-Andhār fī Faḍl ʿIlm al-Tārīkh wa-l-Akhbār which is also known as The Rihla.

== Early life and education ==
Al-Wartilani was born in 1713 in southeastern Kabylia (present-day Sétif Province). He belonged to the Ath Ouartilane tribe. His distant origins can be traced back to the Kutama who played a fundamental role in the Fatimid rise and who built Cairo in 969 and developed Fustat. He loved Kabylia and praised the Kabyle people for their generosity.

He belonged to a family of scholars. At an early age he memorised the Qurʾān and then moved from zawiya to zawiya pursuimg studies in Islamic law (fiqh), theology, grammar, mathematics, and religious sciences to become an ‘Alim like his father and grandfather. He later specialised in Sufism (taṣawwuf), becoming one of the most important Algerian Sufi masters of the 18th century.

== Religious career ==
As head of an important zawiya, al-Wartilani occupied a prominent social and religious rank. Many of his students later became judges (qāḍīs), muftis, and administrators, which ensured him wide recognition throughout Algeria as well as respect from others during his travels. He would usually spend the month of Ramadan in Bejaia, where he taught theology and Sufism and praised the city as a major centre of learning. He emphasised the importance of educating girls and would visit the Ribat to teach in Ramadan.

“Five hundred young girls in Bejaia have learned the Moudawana and that those who know Ibn al-Hadjib ... are countless"

— Hocine al-Wartilani

== Travels and the Rihla ==
Al-Wartilani undertook a number of spiritual journeys (siyāḥāt) across the central Maghreb before he embarked on his second pilgrimage to Mecca. These journeys took him through Kabylia, Constantine, the Zab, western Algeria, Tunisia, Tripolitania, and Cyrenaica.

His major work, the Rihla, completed around 1768, is entitled Nuzhat al-Andhār fī Faḍl ʿIlm al-Tārīkh wa-l-Akhbār (The Diversion of Gazes on the Merits of Historical and Annalistic Science). The Rihla edition contains 713 pages of travel notes and gives a rare insight as to social life in the Maghreb during the 18th century. It was first published in Algiers in 1908 by Mohamed Bencheneb. The work includes personal travel narrative as well as detailed accounts of religious life, especially in Kabylia. Large sections are devoted to Sufi saints, zawiyas, and scholarly networks. This made the Rihla a significant source for the religious, social, and intellectual history of the Maghreb in the 18th century.

== Legacy ==
Al-Wartilani was involved in multiple Sufi traditions such as the Shādhiliyya, Qādiriyya and Khalwatiyya. His work significantly contributed to the preservation of local religious history. This was very apparent through his writings on the scholar-saint Yahyā al-Aydlī and the zawiya of Tamoqra. The Rihla remains a major historical source for pilgrimage practices and the role of religious elites in pre-colonial North Africa.

== Works ==
- Nuzhat al-Andhār fī Faḍl ʿIlm al-Tārīkh wa-l-Akhbār (Rihla)
- Several Sufi and religious commentaries (shurūḥ), including works relating to the tradition of Yahyā al-Aydlī
