= Saruq, Oman =

Saruq
- Village
- Location in Oman
- Coordinates: 23°37′N 58°27′E
- Country: Oman
- Governorate: Muscat Governorate
- Time zone: UTC+4 (Oman Standard Time)

Saruq is a village in Muscat, in northeastern Oman.
