= Karrehkan =

Karrehkan كره كان
- Village
- Location within Iran
- Coordinates: 29°57′38″N 51°44′21″E
- Country: Iran
- Province: Fars
- County: Mamasani
- Bakhsh: Central
- Rural District: Bakesh-e Yek

Population (2006)
  - Total: 127
- Time zone: UTC+3:30 (IRST)
  - Summer (DST): UTC+4:30 (IRDT)

Karrehkan (Persian: كره كان, also Romanized as Karrehkān; also known as Karkān, Korkān, Korkān, and Korrekān) is a village in Bakesh-e Yek Rural District, in the Central District of Mamasani County, Fars province, Iran. At the 2006 census, its population was 127, in 28 families.
