= Sher Sher, East Azerbaijan =

Village in East Azerbaijan, Iran

Sher Sher شرشر
- Village
- Location within Iran
- Coordinates: 37°08′19″N 46°40′50″E
- Country: Iran
- Province: East Azerbaijan
- County: Charuymaq
- Bakhsh: Central
- Rural District: Quri Chay-ye Sharqi

Population (2006)
  - Total: 38
- Time zone: UTC+3:30 (IRST)
  - Summer (DST): UTC+4:30 (IRDT)

Sher Sher (Persian: شرشر, also Romanized as Shar Shar) is a village in Quri Chay-ye Sharqi Rural District, in the Central District of Charuymaq County, East Azerbaijan Province, Iran. At the 2006 census, its population was 38, in 7 families.
