= Baharestan, Zarand =

Baharestan بهارستان
- Village
- Location within Iran
- Coordinates: 30°42′33″N 56°39′24″E
- Country: Iran
- Province: Kerman
- County: Zarand
- Bakhsh: Central
- Rural District: Vahdat

Population (2006)
  - Total: 81
- Time zone: UTC+3:30 (IRST)
  - Summer (DST): UTC+4:30 (IRDT)

Baharestan (Persian: بهارستان, also Romanized as Bahārestān) is a village in Vahdat Rural District, in the Central District of Zarand County, Kerman Province, Iran. At the 2006 census, its population was 81, in 19 families.
