= Chalabeh-ye Olya =

Chalabeh-ye Olya چالابه عليا
- Village
- Location within Iran
- Coordinates: 34°13′20″N 46°49′15″E
- Country: Iran
- Province: Kermanshah
- County: Kermanshah
- Bakhsh: Mahidasht
- Rural District: Mahidasht

Population (2006)
  - Total: 195
- Time zone: UTC+3:30 (IRST)
  - Summer (DST): UTC+4:30 (IRDT)

Chalabeh-ye Olya (Persian: چالابه عليا, also Romanized as Chālābeh-ye ‘Olyā; also known as Chālābeh-ye Bālā, Chālāb-e ‘Olyā, and Chalāwa) is a village in Mahidasht Rural District, Mahidasht District, Kermanshah County, Kermanshah Province, Iran. At the 2006 census, its population was 195, in 42 families.
