= Qomeshlu, East Azerbaijan =

Qomeshlu قمشلو
- Village
- Location within Iran
- Coordinates: 37°11′00″N 46°53′47″E
- Country: Iran
- Province: East Azerbaijan
- County: Charuymaq
- Bakhsh: Central
- Rural District: Charuymaq-e Markazi

Population (2006)
  - Total: 85
- Time zone: UTC+3:30 (IRST)
  - Summer (DST): UTC+4:30 (IRDT)

Qomeshlu (Persian: قمشلو, also Romanized as Qomeshlū) is a village in Charuymaq-e Markazi Rural District, in the Central District of Charuymaq County, East Azerbaijan Province, Iran. At the 2006 census, its population was 85, in 22 families.
