= Baharestan, South Khorasan =

Baharestan بهارستان
- Village
- Location within Iran
- Coordinates: 33°41′59″N 56°48′24″E
- Country: Iran
- Province: South Khorasan
- County: Tabas
- Bakhsh: Central
- Rural District: Montazeriyeh

Population (2006)
  - Total: 40
- Time zone: UTC+3:30 (IRST)
  - Summer (DST): UTC+4:30 (IRDT)

Baharestan (Persian: بهارستان, also Romanized as Bahārestān) is a village in Montazeriyeh Rural District, in the Central District of Tabas County, South Khorasan Province, Iran. At the 2006 census, its population was 40, in 8 families.
