= Qameshlu, Kurdistan =

Qameshlu قمشلو
- Village
- Location within Iran
- Coordinates: 35°56′35″N 47°38′06″E
- Country: Iran
- Province: Kurdistan
- County: Bijar
- Bakhsh: Central
- Rural District: Khvor Khvoreh

Population (2006)
  - Total: 105
- Time zone: UTC+3:30 (IRST)
  - Summer (DST): UTC+4:30 (IRDT)

Qameshlu (Persian: قمشلو, also Romanized as Qameshlū) is a village in Khvor Khvoreh Rural District, in the Central District of Bijar County, Kurdistan Province, Iran. At the 2006 census, its population was 105, in 25 families. The village is populated by Azerbaijanis.
