= Shor Shor, Razavi Khorasan =

Shor Shor شرشر
- Village
- Location within Iran
- Coordinates: 36°20′22″N 59°51′23″E
- Country: Iran
- Province: Razavi Khorasan
- County: Mashhad
- Bakhsh: Central
- Rural District: Kenevist

Population (2006)
  - Total: 463
- Time zone: UTC+3:30 (IRST)
  - Summer (DST): UTC+4:30 (IRDT)

Shor Shor (Persian: شرشر, also Romanized as Shar Shar) is a village in Kenevist Rural District, in the Central District of Mashhad County, Razavi Khorasan Province, Iran. At the 2006 census, its population was 463, in 108 families.
