= Baharestan, Afghanistan =

Baharestan Bahārestān
- Location in Afghanistan
- Coordinates: 36°59′0″N 70°53′0″E
- Country: Afghanistan
- Province: Badakhshan Province
- District: Baharak
- Time zone: + 4.30

Baharestan is a village in Badakhshan Province in north-eastern Afghanistan.
