= Chal Ab Morad Ali =

Chal Ab Morad Ali چال اب مرادعلي
- Village
- Location within Iran
- Coordinates: 33°41′51″N 47°35′27″E
- Country: Iran
- Province: Lorestan
- County: Kuhdasht
- Bakhsh: Central
- Rural District: Kuhdasht-e Shomali

Population (2006)
  - Total: 254
- Time zone: UTC+3:30 (IRST)
  - Summer (DST): UTC+4:30 (IRDT)

Chal Ab Morad Ali (Persian: چال اب مرادعلي, also Romanized as Chāl Āb Morād ʿAlī; also known as Chāl Āb and Chālū Āb) is a village in Kuhdasht-e Shomali Rural District, in the Central District of Kuhdasht County, Lorestan Province, Iran. At the 2006 census, its population was 254, in 49 families.
