= Puch, Razavi Khorasan =

Puch پوچ
- Village
- Location within Iran
- Coordinates: 35°52′04″N 57°34′49″E
- Country: Iran
- Province: Razavi Khorasan
- County: Sabzevar
- Bakhsh: Rud Ab
- Rural District: Khavashod

Population (2006)
  - Total: 265
- Time zone: UTC+3:30 (IRST)
  - Summer (DST): UTC+4:30 (IRDT)

Puch (Persian: پوچ, also Romanized as Pūch; also known as Bahārestān) is a village in Khavashod Rural District, Rud Ab District, Sabzevar County, Razavi Khorasan Province, Iran. At the 2006 census, its population was 265, in 101 families.
