= Kamar Ab, Khuzestan =

Kamar Ab كمراب
- Village
- Location within Iran
- Coordinates: 31°54′50″N 49°45′24″E
- Country: Iran
- Province: Khuzestan
- County: Izeh
- Bakhsh: Central
- Rural District: Howmeh-ye Gharbi

Population (2006)
  - Total: 40
- Time zone: UTC+3:30 (IRST)
  - Summer (DST): UTC+4:30 (IRDT)

Kamar Ab (Persian: كمراب, also Romanized as Kamar Āb) is a village in Howmeh-ye Gharbi Rural District, in the Central District of Izeh County, Khuzestan Province, Iran. At the 2006 census, its population was 40, in 7 families.
