= Javersiyan Rural District =

Rural district in Markazi province, Iran

Javersiyan Rural District Persian: دهستان جاورسيان
- Rural District
- Location within Iran
- Coordinates: 34°15′N 49°24′E
- Country: Iran
- Province: Markazi
- County: Khondab
- District: Qareh Chay
- Established: 1987
- Capital: Javersiyan

Population (2016)
  - Total: 7,098
- Time zone: UTC+3:30 (IRST)

Javersiyan Rural District (Persian: دهستان جاورسيان) (Note: Formerly Shara Rural District (دهستان شراء)) is in Qareh Chay District of Khondab County, Markazi province, Iran. It is administered from the city of Javersiyan.

== Demographics ==
=== Population ===
At the time of the 2006 National Census, the rural district's population (as a part of the former Khondab District in Arak County) was 13,045 in 3,605 households. There were 8,178 inhabitants in 2,491 households at the following census of 2011, by which time the district had been separated from the county in the establishment of Khondab County. The rural district was transferred to the new Qareh Chay District. The 2016 census measured the population of the rural district as 7,098 in 2,376 households. The most populous of its 15 villages was Khaneqah-e Olya, with 1,031 people.

=== Other villages in the rural district ===
- Adeshteh
- Ayjan
- Deh-e Sadd
- Deh-e Shir Khan
- Derman
- Suzan
