= Chalab-e Pain =

Chalab-e Pain چالاب پائين
- Village
- Location within Iran
- Coordinates: 34°06′57″N 47°10′04″E
- Country: Iran
- Province: Kermanshah
- County: Kermanshah
- Bakhsh: Firuzabad
- Rural District: Sar Firuzabad

Population (2006)
  - Total: 94
- Time zone: UTC+3:30 (IRST)
  - Summer (DST): UTC+4:30 (IRDT)

Chalab-e Pain (Persian: چالاب پائين, also Romanized as Chālāb-e Pā'īn) is a village in Sar Firuzabad Rural District, Firuzabad District, Kermanshah County, Kermanshah Province, Iran. At the 2006 census, its population was 94, in 20 families.
