= Meysamabad, Kerman =

Meysamabad ميثم اباد
- Village
- Location within Iran
- Coordinates: 28°16′31″N 57°52′54″E
- Country: Iran
- Province: Kerman
- County: Anbarabad
- Bakhsh: Central
- Rural District: Jahadabad

Population (2006)
  - Total: 712
- Time zone: UTC+3:30 (IRST)
  - Summer (DST): UTC+4:30 (IRDT)

Meysamabad (Persian: ميثم اباد, also Romanized as Meys̱amābād) is a village in Jahadabad Rural District, in the Central District of Anbarabad County, Kerman Province, Iran. At the 2006 census, its population was 712, in 137 families.
