= Saruq, Markazi =

City in Markazi province, Iran

Saruq Persian: ساروق
- City
- Location within Iran
- Coordinates: 34°24′27″N 49°30′29″E
- Country: Iran
- Province: Markazi
- County: Arak
- District: Saruq
- Established as a city: 2009

Population (2016)
  - Total: 1,345
- Time zone: UTC+3:30 (IRST)

Saruq (Persian: ساروق) (Note: Also romanized as Sārūq; also known as Qal‘eh-ye Bālā, Qal‘eh-ye Bālā Sārūq, Qal‘eh-ye Sārūq, Sārūqi, and Sūrakh) is a city in, and the capital of, Saruq District of Arak County, Markazi province, Iran. It also serves as the administrative center for Saruq Rural District.

== Demographics ==
=== Population ===
At the time of the 2006 National Census, Saruq's population was 2,189 in 647 households, when it was a village in Saruq Rural District of the Central District. The following census in 2011 counted 1,386 people in 452 households, by which time the rural district had been separated from the district in the formation of Saruq District. The village of Saruq had been converted to a city. The 2016 census measured the population of the city as 1,345 people in 467 households.
