= Chalab-e Bekr =

ChalawBakr چالاوبكر
- Village
- Location within Iran
- Coordinates: 34°07′36″N 46°20′18″E
- Country: Iran
- Province: Kermanshah
- County: Eslamabad-e Gharb
- Bakhsh: Central
- Rural District: Howmeh-ye Jonubi

Population (2006)
  - Total: 661
- Time zone: UTC+3:30 (IRST)
  - Summer (DST): UTC+4:30 (IRDT)

Chalab-e Bakr (Persian: چالاوب كر, also Romanized as ChālāwBakr; also known as ChālāwBakr, Chālāv-e Bakr, and Chālaw Bakr) is a village in Howmeh-ye Jonubi Rural District, in the Central District of Eslamabad-e Gharb County, Kermanshah Province, Iran. At the 2006 census, its population was 661, in 148 families.
