= Godar Shah =

Godar Shah گدارشاه
- Village
- Location within Iran
- Coordinates: 28°07′35″N 56°48′44″E
- Country: Iran
- Province: Hormozgan
- County: Hajjiabad
- Bakhsh: Ahmadi
- Rural District: Kuh Shah

Population (2006)
  - Total: 115
- Time zone: UTC+3:30 (IRST)
  - Summer (DST): UTC+4:30 (IRDT)

Godar Shah (Persian: گدارشاه, also Romanized as Godār Shāh) is a village in Kuh Shah Rural District, Ahmadi District, Hajjiabad County, Hormozgan Province, Iran. At the 2006 census, its population was 115, in 30 families.
