= Khondab =

City in Markazi province, Iran

Khondab Persian: خنداب
- City
- Location within Iran
- Coordinates: 34°23′31″N 49°11′02″E
- Country: Iran
- Province: Markazi
- County: Khondab
- District: Central

Population (2016)
  - Total: 7,810
- Time zone: UTC+3:30 (IRST)

Khondab (Persian: خنداب (Note: Also romanized as Khondāb; also known as Khāndāb (خانداب))) is a city in the Central District of Khondab County, Markazi province, Iran, serving as capital of both the county and the district. It is also the administrative center for Khondab Rural District. The heavy water reactor IR-40 is nearby.

== History ==
In 2025, during the Twelve-Day War, Israel told residents of Khondab and Arak to evacuate prior to an Israeli strike on the Arak heavy water reactor.

== Demographics ==
=== Population ===
At the time of the 2006 National Census, the city's population was 6,982 in 1,787 households, when it was capital of the former Khondab District in Arak County. The following census in 2011 counted 7,753 people in 2,186 households, by which time the district had been separated from the county in the establishment of Khondab County. The city and the rural district were transferred to the new Central District, with Khondab as the county's capital. The 2016 census measured the population of the city as 7,810 people in 2,358 households.
