= Chalabeh-ye Sofla =

Village in Kermanshah, Iran

Chalabeh-ye Sofla چالابه سفلي
- Village
- Location within Iran
- Coordinates: 34°14′47″N 46°50′54″E
- Country: Iran
- Province: Kermanshah
- County: Kermanshah
- Bakhsh: Mahidasht
- Rural District: Mahidasht

Population (2006)
  - Total: 185
- Time zone: UTC+3:30 (IRST)
  - Summer (DST): UTC+4:30 (IRDT)

Chalabeh-ye Sofla (Persian: چالابه سفلي, also Romanized as Chālābeh-ye Soflá; also known as Chālāb-e Soflá and Godār) is a village in Mahidasht Rural District, Mahidasht District, Kermanshah County, Kermanshah Province, Iran. At the 2006 census, its population was 185, in 45 families.
