= Shor Shoreh, Dorud =

Shor Shoreh شرشره
- Village
- Location within Iran
- Coordinates: 33°35′37″N 49°09′06″E
- Country: Iran
- Province: Lorestan
- County: Dorud
- Bakhsh: Central
- Rural District: Zhan

Population (2006)
  - Total: 106
- Time zone: UTC+3:30 (IRST)
  - Summer (DST): UTC+4:30 (IRDT)

Shor Shoreh (Persian: شرشره, also known as Shūr Shūr, Qal‘eh Shū Shūr, Qal‘eh-ye Shūr Shūr, and Shor Shor) is a village in Zhan Rural District, in the Central District of Dorud County, Lorestan Province, Iran. At the 2006 census, its population was 106, in 22 families.
