= Khondab Rural District =

Rural district in Markazi province, Iran

Khondab Rural District Persian: دهستان خنداب
- Rural District
- Location within Iran
- Coordinates: 34°25′N 49°09′E
- Country: Iran
- Province: Markazi
- County: Khondab
- District: Central
- Established: 1987
- Capital: Khondab

Population (2016)
  - Total: 8,954
- Time zone: UTC+3:30 (IRST)

Khondab Rural District (Persian: دهستان خنداب) is in the Central District of Khondab County, Markazi province, Iran. It is administered from the city of Khondab.

== Demographics ==
=== Population ===
At the time of the 2006 National Census, the rural district's population (as a part of the former Khondab District in Arak County) was 9,127 in 2,189 households. There were 9,065 inhabitants in 2,408 households at the following census of 2011, by which time the district had been separated from the county in the establishment of Khondab County. The rural district was transferred to the new Central District. The 2016 census measured the population of the rural district as 8,954 in 2,485 households. The most populous of its 26 villages was Gazeran, with 1,446 people.

=== Other villages in the rural district ===
- Dehnow
- Dizabad
- Gheynarjeh
- Jowshirvan
- Qalibaf
- Qelich Tappeh
