= Deh Chal Rural District =

Rural district in Markazi province, Iran

Deh Chal Rural District Persian: دهستان دهچال
- Rural District
- Location within Iran
- Coordinates: 34°29′N 49°03′E
- Country: Iran
- Province: Markazi
- County: Khondab
- District: Central
- Established: 1987
- Capital: Deh Chal

Population (2016)
  - Total: 7,382
- Time zone: UTC+3:30 (IRST)

Deh Chal Rural District (Persian: دهستان دهچال) is in the Central District of Khondab County, Markazi province, Iran. Its capital is the village of Deh Chal.

== Demographics ==
=== Population ===
At the time of the 2006 National Census, the rural district's population (as a part of the former Khondab District in Arak County) was 9,583 in 2,253 households. There were 8,747 inhabitants in 2,365 households at the following census of 2011, by which time the district had been separated from the county in the establishment of Khondab County. The rural district was transferred to the new Central District. The 2016 census measured the population of the rural district as 7,382 in 2,267 households. The most populous of its 20 villages was Furan, with 1,384 people.

=== Other villages in the rural district ===
- Aliabad
- Chizan
- Emamzadeh Deh Chal
- Hoseynabad-e Muqufeh
- Nasirabad
- Qasemabad
