= Sang Sefid Rural District =

Rural district in Markazi province, Iran

Sang Sefid Rural District Persian: دهستان سنگ سفيد
- Rural District
- Location within Iran
- Coordinates: 34°16′N 49°11′E
- Country: Iran
- Province: Markazi
- County: Khondab
- District: Qareh Chay
- Established: 1987
- Capital: Tur Gir

Population (2016)
  - Total: 7,825
- Time zone: UTC+3:30 (IRST)

Sang Sefid Rural District (Persian: دهستان سنگ سفيد) is in Qareh Chay District of Khondab County, Markazi province, Iran. Its capital is the village of Tur Gir.

== Demographics ==
=== Population ===
At the time of the 2006 National Census, the rural district's population (as a part of the former Khondab District in Arak County) was 8,669 in 2,112 households. There were 8,569 inhabitants in 2,435 households at the following census of 2011, by which time the district had been separated from the county in the establishment of Khondab County. The rural district was transferred to the new Qareh Chay District. The 2016 census measured the population of the rural district as 7,825 in 2,447 households. The most populous of its 14 villages was Aqdash, with 2,763 people.

=== Other villages in the rural district ===
- Aludar
- Gezerdar
- Hoseyniyeh
- Ostuh
- Qaleh-ye Abbasabad
- Shahid
