= Saruq Rural District (Arak County) =

Rural district in Markazi province, Iran

Saruq Rural District Persian: دهستان ساروق
- Rural District
- Location within Iran
- Coordinates: 34°26′N 49°25′E
- Country: Iran
- Province: Markazi
- County: Arak
- District: Saruq
- Established: 1987
- Capital: Saruq

Population (2016)
  - Total: 6,166
- Time zone: UTC+3:30 (IRST)

Saruq Rural District (Persian: دهستان ساروق) is in Saruq District of Arak County, Markazi province, Iran. It is administered from the city of Saruq.

== Demographics ==
=== Population ===
At the time of the 2006 National Census, the rural district's population (as a part of the Central District) was 8,410 in 2,234 households. There were 6,678 inhabitants in 1,998 households at the following census of 2011, by which time the rural district had been separated from the district in the formation of Saruq District. The 2016 census measured the population of the rural district as 6,166 in 1,973 households. The most populous of its 16 villages was Jiria, with 2,462 people.

=== Other villages in the rural district ===
- Bahadorestan
- Farsi Jan
- Gavjellu
- Jamabad
- Jiria
- Kalagh Neshin
- Karkan-e Bala
- Karkan-e Pain
- Lenjab-e Sofla
- Qaleh-ye Arjanavand
- Qatar-e Aghaj-e Sofla
- Tur
