= Central District (Khondab County) =

District in Markazi province, Iran

Central District (Khondab County) Persian: بخش مرکزی شهرستان خنداب
- District
- Location within Iran
- Coordinates: 34°28′N 49°08′E
- Country: Iran
- Province: Markazi
- County: Khondab
- Established: 2007
- Capital: Khondab

Population (2016)
  - Total: 24,146
- Time zone: UTC+3:30 (IRST)

The Central District of Khondab County (Persian: بخش مرکزی شهرستان خنداب) is in Markazi province, Iran. Its capital is the city of Khondab.

== History ==
In 2007, Khondab District was separated from Arak County in the establishment of Khondab County, which was divided into two districts and five rural districts, with Khondab as its capital.

== Demographics ==
=== Population ===
At the time of the 2011 National Census, the district's population was 25,565 people in 6,959 households. The 2016 census measured the population of the district as 24,146 inhabitants in 7,110 households.

=== Administrative divisions ===
Central District (Khondab County) Population
Administrative Divisions	2011	2016
Deh Chal RD	8,747	7,382
Khondab RD	9,065	8,954
Khondab (city)	7,753	7,810
Total	25,565	24,146
RD = Rural District
