= Saruq District =

District in Markazi province, Iran

Saruq District Persian: بخش ساروق
- District
- Location within Iran
- Coordinates: 34°23′N 49°28′E
- Country: Iran
- Province: Markazi
- County: Arak
- Established: 2007
- Capital: Saruq

Population (2016)
  - Total: 10,491
- Time zone: UTC+3:30 (IRST)

Saruq District (Persian: بخش ساروق) is in Arak County, Markazi province, Iran. Its capital is the city of Saruq.

== History ==
In 2007, Saruq Rural District was separated from the Central District in the formation of Saruq District.

== Demographics ==
=== Population ===
At the time of the 2011 National Census, the district's population was 11,328 people in 3,427 households. The 2016 census measured the population of the district as 10,491 inhabitants in 3,373 households.

=== Administrative divisions ===
Saruq District Population
Administrative Divisions	2011	2016
Mashhad ol Kubeh RD	3,264	2,980
Saruq RD	6,678	6,166
Saruq (city)	1,386	1,345
Total	11,328	10,491
RD = Rural District
