= Qareh Chay District =

District in Markazi province, Iran

Qareh Chay District Persian: بخش قره‌چای
- District
- Location within Iran
- Coordinates: 34°15′N 49°18′E
- Country: Iran
- Province: Markazi
- County: Khondab
- Established: 2007
- Capital: Javersiyan

Population (2016)
  - Total: 29,872
- Time zone: UTC+3:30 (IRST)

Qareh Chay District (Persian: بخش قره‌چای) is in Khondab County, Markazi province, Iran. Its capital is the city of Javersiyan.

== History ==
In 2007, Khondab District was separated from Arak County in the establishment of Khondab County, which was divided into two districts and five rural districts, with the city of Khondab as its capital.

== Demographics ==
=== Population ===
At the time of the 2011 National Census, the district's population was 9,722 households. The 2016 census measured the population of the district as 29,872 inhabitants in 9,682 households.

=== Administrative divisions ===
Qareh Chay District Population
Administrative Divisions	2011	2016
Enaj RD	11,224	9,956
Javersiyan RD (Note: Formerly Shara Rural District)	8,178	7,098
Sang Sefid RD	8,569	7,825
Javersiyan (city)	4,726	4,993
Total	32,697	29,872
RD = Rural District
