= Khondab District =

Former district in Markazi province, Iran

Khondab District Persian: بخش خنداب
- Former District
- Location within Iran
- Coordinates: 34°23′N 49°16′E
- Country: Iran
- Province: Markazi
- County: Arak
- Capital: Khondab

Population (2006)
  - Total: 59,112
- Time zone: UTC+3:30 (IRST)

Khondab District (Persian: بخش خنداب) is a former administrative division of Arak County, Markazi province, Iran. Its capital was the city of Khondab.

== History ==
In 2007, the district was separated from the county in the establishment of Khondab County.

== Demographics ==
=== Population ===
At the time of the 2006 National Census, the district's population was 59,112 in 15,075 households.

=== Administrative divisions ===
Khondab District Population
Administrative Divisions	2006
Deh Chal RD	9,583
Enaj RD	11,706
Javersiyan RD (Note: Formerly Shara Rural District)	13,045
Khondab RD	9,127
Sang Sefid RD	8,669
Khondab (city)	6,982
Total	59,112
RD = Rural District
