= Khondab County =

County in Markazi province, Iran

Khondab County Persian: شهرستان خنداب
- County
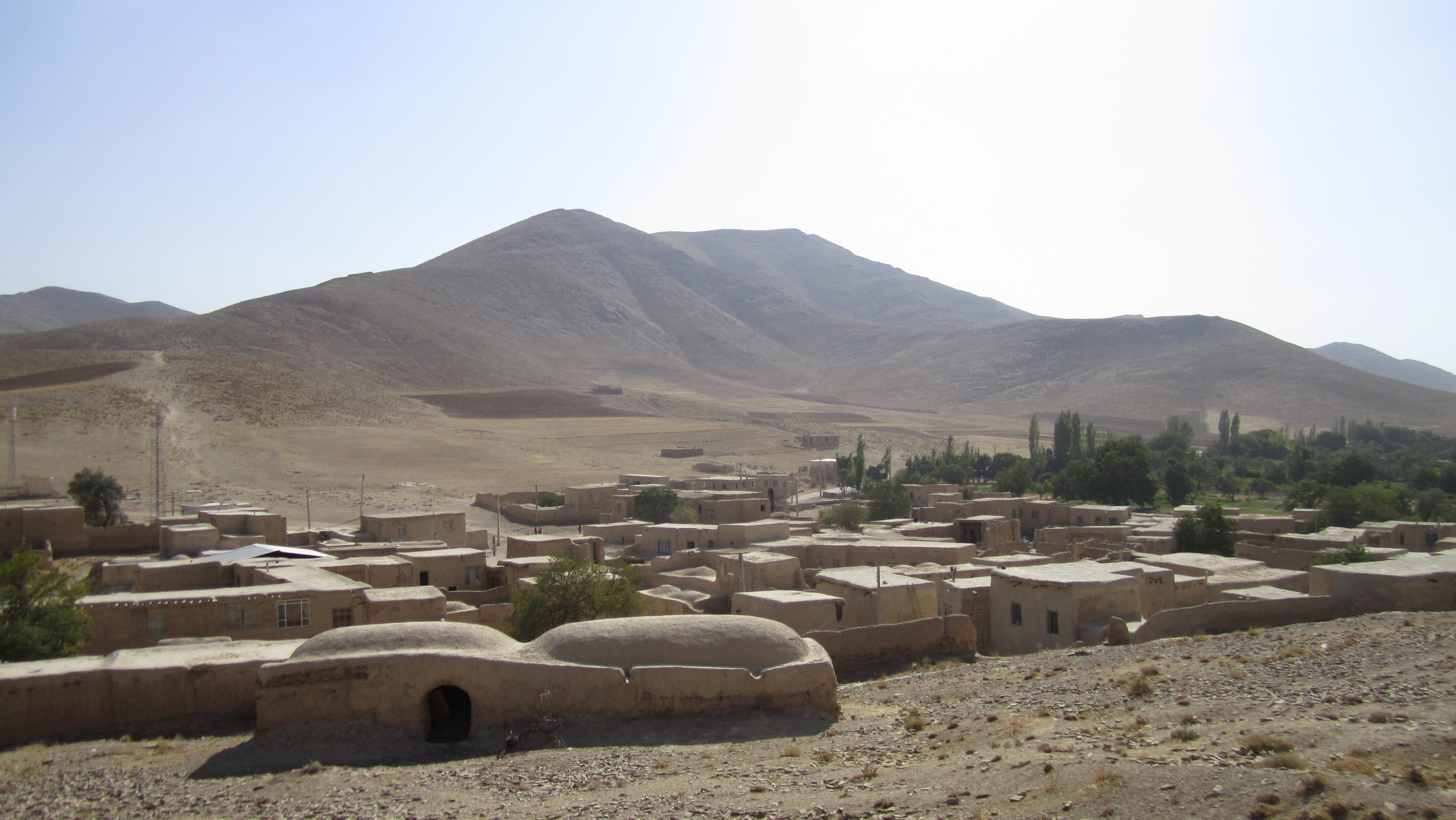
- The village of Kharpahlu in Khondab County

- Location of Khondab County in Markazi province (left, yellow)

- Location of Markazi province in Iran
- Coordinates: 34°23′N 49°16′E
- Country: Iran
- Province: Markazi
- Established: 2007
- Capital: Khondab
- Districts: Central, Qareh Chay

Population (2016)
  - Total: 54,018
- Time zone: UTC+3:30 (IRST)

Khondab County (Persian: شهرستان خنداب) is in Markazi province, Iran. Its capital is the city of Khondab.

== History ==
In 2007, Khondab District was separated from Arak County in the establishment of Khondab County, which was divided into two districts and five rural districts, with Khondab as its capital.

== Demographics ==
=== Population ===
At the time of the 2011 National Census, the county's population was 58,262 people in 16,669 households. The 2016 census measured the population of the county as 54,018 in 16,792 households.

=== Administrative divisions ===
Khondab County's population history and administrative structure over two consecutive censuses are shown in the following table.

Khondab County Population
Administrative Divisions	2011	2016
Central District	25,565	24,146
Deh Chal RD	8,747	7,382
Khondab RD	9,065	8,954
Khondab (city)	7,753	7,810
Qareh Chay District	32,697	29,872
Enaj RD	11,224	9,956
Javersiyan RD (Note: Formerly Shara Rural District)	8,178	7,098
Sang Sefid RD	8,569	7,825
Javersiyan (city)	4,726	4,993
Total	58,262	54,018
RD = Rural District

== See also ==
Media related to Khondab County at Wikimedia Commons
