= List of cities, towns and villages in Markazi province =

A list of cities, towns and villages in Markazi Province of central Iran:

== Alphabetical ==
Cities are in bold text; all others are villages.

=== A ===
Ab Bakhshan | Ab Barik | Ab Garm-e Bala | Abbasabad | Abbasabad | Abbasabad | Abbasabad | Abbasabad | Abbasabad-e Muqufeh | Abbasabad-e Piazi | Abbasabad-e Qarah Aghaj | Abrahdar | Adeshteh | Adineh Masjed-e Bala | Adineh Masjed-e Pain | Afghan Refugee Camp | Afshjerd | Aftabru | Aghcheh Bolagh | Aghozi Gang | Ahangaran | Ahmadabad | Ahmadabad | Ahmadabad | Ahmadabad | Ahmadabad | Ahmadabad-e Shadjerd | Ahu | Ajan | Akbarabad | Akbarabad | Akbarabad | Akbarabad-e Nivesht | Akbarabad-e Qushchi | Akhtaj | Aksabad | Alarj | Alavi Culture and Technology Centre | Alborz | Ali Darzi | Aliabad | Aliabad | Aliabad | Aliabad | Aliabad | Aliabad | Aliabad | Aliabad | Aliabad | Aliabad | Aliabad-e Band | Aliabad-e Sanjeh Bashi | Alimabad | Alishar | Ali-ye Qurchi | Aljan | Aludar | Alvandabad | Alvijan | Alvir | Amanabad | Amaniyeh | Amereh | Aminabad | Amirabad | Amirabad | Amirabad | Amirabad | Amirabad | Amirabad-e Bezanjan | Amiriyeh | Ananjerd | Anbarteh | Andarpa | Andis | Anjedan | Anjilavand-e Olya | Anjirak | Aq Bolaq-e Mohammad Hoseyn Khan | Aq Kahriz | Aq Qaleh | Aqa Jakandi | Aqa Ziarat | Aqbolagh-e Sadat | Aqcheh Kahriz | Aqcheh Qaleh | Aqdash | Aqdash | Aqilabad | Ara Qaleh | Arak | Araqiyeh | Areklu | Arezumand | Arjanavand | Arjrud | Arkowyen | Arzaqan | Asadabad | Asadabad | Asarvan | Asemabad | Ashianak | Ashianeh-ye Olya | Ashianeh-ye Sofla | Ashmesian | Ashna Khvor | Ashoqeh | Ashqal | Ashtian | Asiabak-e Band | Asiab-e Jelal-e Sofla | Askin | Astaneh | Ateshkuh | Atolen | Aveh | Ayjan | Ayr | Azad Kin | Azad Marzabad | Azbizan | Azizabad | Azizabad | Aznowjan | Azodiyeh

=== B ===
Badam Chaloq | Baghabad | Baghcheh Ghaz | Baghdadi | Bagh-e Bar Aftab | Bagh-e Shadi | Bagh-e Sheykh | Bahadorestan | Bahar | Baharan | Baharestan | Baharestan | Bahariyeh | Bahmani | Bahramabad | Bajgiran | Baleqlu | Ban | Band-e Amir | Band-e Chay | Band-e Naqin | Baneh | Baqerabad | Baqerabad | Bar Bar | Barfian | Bargeleh | Baryeh | Bayatan-e Sukhteh | Bazarjan | Bazneh | Bazneh | Bazneh Industrial Complex | Behdasht | Beklik | Belaftu | Belaverjan | Berah Mum | Besri | Bidlu | Bijegan | Bilaq | Bivaran | Bolagh | Boluband | Bon Chenar | Bon-e Gonbad | Borj | Borjak | Borj-e Abbas Khan | Borj-e Balan | Borj-e Cheshmeh-ye Mahmud | Borzabad | Bozi Jan | Building Stone Factory | Burqan

=== C ===
Chabar | Chah Bar | Chahar Cherik | Chahar Cheshmeh | Chahar Hadd | Chahar Taq | Chah-e Mirza Hasan | Chakhmaq Tappeh | Chal Homa | Chal Mian | Chalab-e Olya | Chalab-e Sofla | Chalbi | Chalfakhreh | Cham-e Rahim | Chamran | Changezin | Chaqa Seyf ol Din | Chaqa Siah | Chaqqar | Charmak | Chehel Raz | Chehreqan | Chelesban | Chenaqchi-ye Olya | Chenaqchi-ye Sofla | Chenar | Chenar | Chenarestan | Chenarestan | Chenas | Cheqa | Cheshmeh Khurzan | Cheshmeh Pahn | Cheshmeh Sefid | Cheshmeh-ye Allahverdi | Cheshmeh-ye Sar | Chichiabad | Chizan | Choqa Pahneh | Chowgan | Chowgan

=== D ===
Dadamraz | Dakhan | Dalestan | Damurchi | Danian | Dar Anjir | Darband | Darband-e Guyilagh | Darband-e Loran | Darbar | Darb-e Juqa | Darestan | Darreh Garm | Darreh Piri | Darreh Sabz | Darreh Shur | Darreh | Darvishan | Dasht Luyin Integrated Agricultural Complex | Dastjan | Dastjerdeh | Dastjerdeh | Davudabad | Davudabad | Dayen | Deh Chal | Deh Molla | Deh-e Abdollah | Deh-e Ahmad | Deh-e Ali Khan | Deh-e Ali Morad | Deh-e Aqa | Deh-e Aqa | Deh-e Asghar | Deh-e Davud | Deh-e Golshan | Deh-e Hoseyn | Deh-e Kaid | Deh-e Kharabeh Kand | Deh-e Kowsar | Deh-e Mahdi | Deh-e Mir Qasem | Deh-e Mowla | Deh-e Namak | Deh-e Now | Deh-e Sadd | Deh-e Salman | Deh-e Shir Khan | Deh-e Zaman | Deh-e Zu ol Faqar | Dehlaq | Dehnow | Dehpul | Delaram | Delijan | Derman | Dermanak | Dinarabad | Dineh Kabud | Dinjerd | Divkan | Dizabad | Dizaj | Dizak | Do Ab | Do Dehak | Do Gush | Do Joft | Do Zia | Domaney | Dowlatabad | Dowlatabad | Dowruzan | Duridan | Duzaj

=== E ===
Ebrahimabad | Ebrahimabad | Ebrahimabad | Ebrahimabad | Ebrahimabad | Emamabad | Emamzadeh Abbas | Emamzadeh Abdollah | Emamzadeh Deh Chal | Emamzadeh Khuraq | Emamzadeh Varcheh | Emamzadeh Yujan | Emarat | Enaj | Esfahanak | Esfandan | Esfanjeh | Esfin | Eskan | Eskandarlu | Esmailabad | Esmailabad | Estahlak | Estijak | Eybakabad | Eybakabad Industrial Estate | Eynabad | Eyvand-e Now | Ezz od Din | Ezzatabad

=== F ===
Falaver-e Bala | Falaver-e Pain | Famarin | Faqerlu | Far | Farab | Farajabad | Farajabad | Farak | Farak | Fardeqan | Farfahan | Farisabad | Farismaneh | Farmahin | Farnam | Farnaq | Farnaq | Farqas | Farsi Jan | Fasharud | Fastaq | Fathabad | Fathabad | Fazlabad | Fesengan | Feshk | Feyzabad, Ashtian | Feyzabad, Zarandieh | Feyzi Hasan | Feyzianeh-e Sofla | Flujerd | Fruit and Vegetable Centre | Furan

=== G ===
Gachlu | Garakan | Garmab | Gav Khaneh | Gavar | Gavi Cheshmeh | Gavjellu | Gazavand | Gazeran | Gazeran | Gaztaf-e Olya | Gaztaf-e Sofla | Gezerdar | Gharqabad | Ghazemabad | Ghazemabad | Gheynarjeh | Ghiasabad | Ghinar | Gili | Gol Bedaq | Gol Tappeh | Gol Zard-e Malmir | Golcheshmeh-ye Bala | Goldasht | Gol-e Zard-e Abdi | Gol-e Zard-e Qaleh | Golshanabad | Gomiz | Gorg Baghi | Gorgan | Gowjeh Gol | Gozal Darreh | Gujeh Menar | Guneh | Gunestan | Gurchak | Gurchan | Gusheh | Gusheh-ye Mohammad Malek | Gusheh-ye Olya | Gusheh-ye Sofla

=== H ===
Haftan-e Olya | Hafteh | Hafteh Khanak | Haftian | Hajj Yusef | Hajji Beyg | Hajjiabad | Hajjiabad | Hajjiabad | Hajjiabad | Hajjiabad | Hajjiabad | Hajjiabad | Hajjiabad | Hak-e Olya | Hak-e Sofla | Hakimabad | Hamidiyeh | Haqaniyeh | Harazijan | Hariqan | Harisan | Hasanabad | Hasanabad | Hasanabad | Hasanabad-e Band | Hasanabad-e Qarah Darband | Hasheh | Hashian | Hastijan | Hatamabad | Hazaveh | Hebran | Hendudur | Hesar Darreh | Hesar Qelij | Hesar | Hesar | Hesar-e Mohammadiyeh | Heshmatiyeh | Heydarabad | Hezarabad | Holul | Homrian | Horrabad | Hoseynabad | Hoseynabad | Hoseynabad | Hoseynabad | Hoseynabad | Hoseynabad | Hoseynabad | Hoseynabad-e Muqufeh | Hoseynabad-e Sadat | Hoseyniyeh

=== I ===
Imanlu | Industrial Centre | Isaabad | Istgah-e Kuh Pank

=== J ===
Jafarabad | Jafarabad | Jafarabad | Jahan Qaleh | Jahanabad | Jalakbar | Jalalabad | Jalalabad | Jalayer | Jalayer | Jalmajerd-e Jadid | Jamabad | Jamalabad | Jamalabad | Jamalabad | Jamalkeh | Jamshidabad | Javadiyeh | Javersiyan | Jazanaq | Jiria | Joftan | Jownush | Jowshirvan | Jubadeh | Judan | Jurqin | Jushaq | Jushqan

=== K ===
Kabud Kamar | Kaf San | Kahak | Kahak | Kahak | Kajarestan | Kala | Kalagh Neshin | Kaleh Namak Kur | Kalleh Dasht | Kalleh-ye Nahr Mian | Kalvan | Kamal Saleh | Kamalabad-e Bala | Kamalabad-e Pain | Kamalu | Kamankesh | Kamar Ab | Kamarak | Kandej | Kandha | Kangaran | Kapar | Karahrud | Karchan | Karchan | Kardijan | Karimabad | Karkan | Karkanak | Karkan-e Bala | Karkan-e Pain | Karkhaneh | Karvansara | Karyan | Kasheh | Kashkevar | Kasr-e Asef | Katiran-e Bala | Katiran-e Pain | Kaveh Industrial City | Kazemabad | Kazemabad | Kazzaz | Kerk | Kerugan | Khalaj-e Malmir | Khalaj-e Olya | Khalifeh Bolaghi | Khalifeh Kandi | Khalilabad | Khaltabad | Khamestan | Khana Darreh-ye Olya | Khana Darreh-ye Sofla | Khanak | Khaneh Miran | Khaneqah | Khaneqah-e Olya | Kharpahlu | Kharrazan | Khatamabad | Khaveh | Khenejin | Kheshti Jan | Kheyrabad | Kheyrabad | Kheyrabad | Kheyrabad | Khiz Ab | Kholuzin | Khomar Baghi | Khomeyn | Khondab | Khondab | Khoravand | Khorramabad | Khorramabad | Khorramabad | Khorramabad-e Laqu | Khosbijan | Khoshkehdar-e Malmir | Khoshkrud | Khoshkrud | Khosravan-e Olya | Khosravan-e Sofla | Khosrow Beyg | Khugan | Khurheh | Khvorakabad | Khvorcheh | Khvorzan | Khvorzan-e Olya | Khvoshdun | Kishan | Kohlu-ye Olya | Kohlu-ye Sofla | Kohneh Hesar | Kolah Chub | Kolahduz | Koleh Bid | Komijan | Kord Khvord-e Olya | Kord Khvord-e Sofla | Kordabad | Kordak | Koreh Bar | Kudarz | Kudzar | Kuh-e Sefid | Kuhin | Kukah | Kukan | Kuksigerd | Kureh Zar | Kureh | Kus Ali | Kushkak | Kushkak | Kutabad

=== L ===
Lakan | Lalain | Lalekan | Lanj Rud | Lanjeh | Lar | Laran | Lenjab-e Sofla | Lorijan | Lowz Dar | Lowzdar-e Olya | Lowzdar-e Sofla | Lowzdar-e Vosta |

=== M ===
Machinak | Madan-e Kerk | Mahajeran | Mahajeran-e Abu ol Hasan | Mahajeran-e Kamar | Mahajeran-e Khak | Mahallat | Mahmudabad | Mahmudabad | Mahmudabad | Mahmudabad | Mahmudabad | Mahmudiyeh | Mahurzan | Majdabad-e Kohneh | Majdabad-e Now | Majdian | Majidabad | Makkan | Malard | Malek Ashtar Garrison | Malek Baghi | Malekabad | Malekabad | Malham Dar | Malmir | Mamuniyeh | Manizan | Manjinqan | Mansur Khvajeh | Maqsudabad | Mar | Maragheh | Maraq Kan | Maraq | Marzijaran | Masenabad | Mashhad ol Kubeh | Mashhad-e Bazarjan | Mashhad-e Meyqan | Mashhad-e Zolfabad | Master | Masumiyeh | Mazar | Mazayen | Mazgan | Mazlaqan | Mazraeh Now | Mazraeh-ye Banak Keshavarzi | Mazraeh-ye Khatun | Mazraeh-ye Kishan | Mazraeh-ye Now | Mazraeh-ye Qasem | Mazraeh-ye Seh Chah | Mazraeh-ye Shurcheh | Mazraeh-ye Tuklian | Mehdiabad | Mehdiabad | Mehdiabad | Mehdiabad | Mehrabad | Mehrabad | Mehr-e Olya | Mehr-e Sofla | Meserqan | Mesrlu | Meydanak | Meymah | Meyqan | Meysamabad | Mian Rud | Mian Rudan | Mibaran | Michak | Michan | Mil | Milajerd | Minudasht | Mirabad | Mishijan-e Olya | Mishijan-e Sofla | Mobarakabad | Mobarakabad | Mohammadabad | Mohammadabad | Mohammadabad | Mohammadabad | Mohammadabad | Mohammadiyeh | Mohammadiyeh | Mohsenabad | Moinabad | Mokhlesabad | Molla Baqer-e Olya | Moqdadiyeh | Moradabad | Moradkhanli | Morvar | Morvarid Darreh | Moshkan | Moslehabad | Moslemabad | Movak | Mozvar | Mozvash | Muchan | Musaabad | Musaabad | Musaabad | Mutabad |

=== N ===
Nabi Dar | Naderabad | Nafis | Nahr-e Mian | Nahr-e Poshteh | Najafabad | Najafabad | Najafabad | Nakhjirvan | Namak Kur | Naqusan | Naraq | Nasirabad | Nasirabad | Nasrabad | Navazen | Nazi | Nazmabad | Nehshahr | Neyestan | Neyneh | Nezamabad | Nezamabad | Niazagheh | Nimvar | Nivesht | Noshveh | Nosratabad | Now Deh | Nowbahar | Nowbaran | Nowdeh | Nowdeh-e Hajji Nabi | Nur Ali Beyk | Nurabad | Nurabad | Nurabad | Nur-e Eyn

=== O ===
Olusjerd | Omarabad | Ordmin | Ortagol | Ostuh | Ostuj | Owjan

=== P ===
Pain Vand | Pakal | Palang Dar | Palangab | Palangabad | Pandar Jan | Parandak | Parkak | Parkaleh | Petrochemical Works | Peyk | Piazabad | Piman | Poluli | Poshtkuh

=== Q ===
Qadamgah | Qaidan | Qalandariyeh | Qaleh Babu | Qaleh Now | Qaleh Now | Qalehchi-ye Bala | Qalehchi-ye Pain | Qaleh-ye Abbasabad | Qaleh-ye Abbasabad | Qaleh-ye Abdollah | Qaleh-ye Afshar | Qaleh-ye Ahmad Beyk | Qaleh-ye Aqa Hamid | Qaleh-ye Aqdarreh | Qaleh-ye Arjanavand | Qaleh-ye Asadabad | Qaleh-ye Ashna Khvor | Qaleh-ye Azraj | Qaleh-ye Baleman | Qaleh-ye Dizijan | Qaleh-ye Farhadiyeh | Qaleh-ye Gav Godar | Qaleh-ye Hajji Shafi | Qaleh-ye Mansuriyeh Jadid | Qaleh-ye Mohammad Beyg | Qaleh-ye Now | Qaleh-ye Pasi Jan | Qaleh-ye Qods | Qaleh-ye Shir Khan | Qaleh-ye Teyn | Qaleh-ye Yujan | Qalhar | Qalibaf | Qamar Khun | Qameshlu | Qanyaruq-e Bala | Qanyaruq-e Pain | Qaqan | Qarah Bonyad | Qarah Dash | Qarah Jaqayah | Qarah Kahriz | Qardin | Qareh Chay | Qarineh Darreh | Qarloq | Qasemabad | Qasemabad | Qasemabad | Qasemabad | Qasemabad-e Olya | Qasemabad-e Sofla | Qatar-e Aghaj-e Sofla | Qelich Tappeh | Qermez Cheshmeh | Qermezin | Qeshlaq | Qeshlaq-e Abbasabad | Qeshlaq-e Abd ol Karim | Qeshlaq-e Anjilavand-e Sofla | Qeshlaq-e Chalablu | Qeshlaq-e Hoseynabad | Qeshlaq-e Musalu | Qeshlaq-e Qarah Zagheh | Qeshlaq-e Qiyujik | Qeshlaq-e Qotbabad | Qeshlaq-e Sabz Ali | Qeshlaq-e Sialeh | Qeshlaq-e Ziba | Qeyapa | Qeydu | Qeytaniyeh | Qezel Qaleh | Qezel Qash | Qezeljeh | Qezelqash | Qiajik | Qiz Qaleh | Qozlijeh | Quch Bolaghi | Quchak | Quch-e Emam | Qurchi Bashi | Qush Tappeh | Qusheh Khani

=== R ===
Rahmatabad | Rahzan | Rakin | Rashan | Rashidabad | Rastgordan | Rasulabad | Ravanj | Raveh | Razan | Razeghi | Razgardan | Raziabad | Razin | Revesht | Reyhan-e Olya | Reyhan-e Sofla | Rezaabad | Rezaabad | Rezaabad | Rijan | Robat Mil | Robat Tork | Robat-e Aghaj | Robat-e Arjomand | Robat-e Morad | Robat-e Olya | Robat-e Sofla | Rostam Rah | Rowghani | Rowshanai | Rudbaran

=== S ===
Saadatabad | Sabzabad | Sadabad | Sadeqabad | Sadrabad | Safiabad | Safiabad | Sahlabad | Sahmabad | Saidabad | Saidiyeh | Saki-ye Olya | Saki-ye Sofla | Salehabad | Salehabad | Salehi | Salimabad | Saman | Samar Dasht | Samar Dasht | Samavak | Samqavor | Sanavord | Sangak | Sangar | Sang-e Sefid | Sangestan | Sanjeh Bashi | Saq | Saqar Juqak | Saqi | Sar Chal | Sar Kamari | Sar Kubeh | Sar Sakhti-ye Bala | Sar Sakhti-ye Pain | Sar Taq | Sarabadan | Sarahrud | Sarband | Sardarabad | Sari Qash | Sari-ye Sofla | Sarjelu | Sarshekaf | Saruq | Savarabad | Savarabad-e Olya | Savarabad-e Sofla | Saveh | Sefid Ab | Sefid Shaban | Selijerd | Senjan | Senjedak | Seqanliq | Seqer Juq | Setaq | Seydabad | Seyfabad | Seyjan | Seyyedabad | Seyyedabad | Seyyedabad | Shad Baghi | Shahid | Shahr Ab | Shahr-e Mizan | Shahrjerd | Shahsavan Kandi-ye Sofla | Shahsavaran | Shamsabad | Shamsabad | Shamsabad | Shamsabad | Shaneq | Shaneq | Sharaflu | Shaveh | Shazand | Shekarabad | Sherkat-e Gol Nama | Sherkat-e Qeshlaq-e Mahar | Shir Ali Biglu | Shirin Bolagh | Shirinabad | Shor Shoreh | Shotoriyeh | Shulak | Shur Bolagh | Shurakabad | Shureh-ye Pain | Siah Soltan | Sian-e Olya | Sian-e Sofla | Sinak | Sineqan | Sir Dar | Sir Kand | Siran | Siyavashan | Soheyl Najafabad | Sokaneh | Soltan Ahmadlu | Soltanabad | Soluklu | Sorkheh Deh | Sos Kondar | Suk Qazqan | Sulab | Suran | Suraneh | Susan Naqin | Susanabad | Susanabad | Suzan

=== T ===
Tabarteh | Tad | Tahereh Khatun | Taht-e Mahall | Tahyaq | Tajareh | Tajareh | Taj-e Dowlatshah | Takyeh | Takyeh | Talkhab | Talkhestan | Tappeh | Taqlidabad | Taramazd | Taraznahid | Tarkhuran | Tarlan | Tarlan | Tavan Dasht-e Olya | Tavan Dasht-e Sofla | Tayeqan | Tayyebabad | Technology Industrial Centre of Mahallat | Teymur Qash | Tirazabad | Tireh | Tokhmar | Tonjaran | Toraqan | Towhidlu | Tur Gir | Tur | Tureh | Tut |

=== U ===
Ud Aghaj

=== V ===
Vafs | Valazjerd | Validabad | Valman | Vanak | Vapileh | Varabad | Varak Bar-e Sofla | Varameh | Varan | Varaqa | Varchand | Varcheh | Varin-e Bala | Varin-e Pain | Varkbar-e Olya | Varsan | Varvan | Vasheh | Vasheqan | Vasmaq | Vaymand | Vazirabad | Velashjerd | Venavi | Verdeh | Veshtegan | Vesmaq | Vesquneqan | Vezmestan-e Olya | Vezvanaq | Vidar | Visman | Vismeh

=== Y ===
Yalabad | Yamn | Yasavol | Yasbolagh | Yatan | Yekeh Bagh-e Sofla | Yekeh Chah | Yengi Molk | Yengi Qaleh | Yevlaq | Yusefabad

=== Z ===
Zaduqabad | Zaghar | Zagheh-ye Akbarabad | Zahirabad | Zahirabad-e Astaneh | Zalian | Zamanabad | Zambar | Zamen Jan | Zangarak | Zangdar | Zanjiran | Zar | Zarnusheh | Zavarqan | Zaviyeh | Ziaabad | Ziaabad | Zorjin
