= Qotbabad (disambiguation) =

Qotbabad is a city in Fars Province, Iran.

Qotbababad may also refer to:

- Qotbabad, Hormozgan
- Qotbabad, Kerman
- Qotbabad, Markazi
- Qotbabad Rural District, in Fars Province
