= Taj-e Dowlatshah =

Taj-e Dowlatshah تاج دولتشاه
- Village
- Location within Iran
- Coordinates: 33°56′00″N 49°11′00″E
- Country: Iran
- Province: Markazi
- County: Shazand
- Bakhsh: Zalian
- Rural District: Nahr-e Mian

Population (2006)
  - Total: 88
- Time zone: UTC+3:30 (IRST)
  - Summer (DST): UTC+4:30 (IRDT)

Taj-e Dowlatshah (Persian: تاج دولتشاه, also Romanized as Tāj-e Dowlatshāh, Tāj Dowlat Shāh, and Tāj-i-Daulat Shāh; also known as ‘Alī Dauleh Shāh, Dauleh Shāh, and Dowleh Shāh) is a village in Nahr-e Mian Rural District, Zalian District, Shazand County, Markazi Province, Iran. At the 2006 census, its population was 88, in 31 families.
