= Varkbar-e Olya =

Varakbar-e Olya وركبارعليا
- Village
- Location within Iran
- Coordinates: 35°19′08″N 49°34′29″E
- Country: Iran
- Province: Markazi
- County: Saveh
- Bakhsh: Nowbaran
- Rural District: Kuhpayeh

Population (2006)
  - Total: 92
- Time zone: UTC+3:30 (IRST)
  - Summer (DST): UTC+4:30 (IRDT)

Varkbar-e Olya (Persian: وركبارعليا, also Romanized as Varkbār-e ‘Olyā; also known as Varkbār and Warkbār) is a village in Kuhpayeh Rural District, Nowbaran District, Saveh County, Markazi Province, Iran. At the 2006 census, its population was 92, in 34 families.
