= Quch-e Emam =

Quch-e Emam قوچ امام
- Village
- Location within Iran
- Coordinates: 35°09′10″N 50°22′49″E
- Country: Iran
- Province: Markazi
- County: Saveh
- Bakhsh: Central
- Rural District: Nur Ali Beyk

Population (2006)
  - Total: 116
- Time zone: UTC+3:30 (IRST)
  - Summer (DST): UTC+4:30 (IRDT)

Quch-e Emam (Persian: قوچ امام, also Romanized as Qūch-e Emām; also known as Qūch-e Emāmeh and Qūch-e Emāmī) is a village in Nur Ali Beyk Rural District, in the Central District of Saveh County, Markazi Province, Iran. At the 2006 census, its population was 116, in 30 families.
