= Qaleh-ye Mohammad Beyg =

Qaleh-ye Mohammad Beyg قلعه محمدبيگ
- Village
- Location within Iran
- Coordinates: 33°40′47″N 50°18′17″E
- Country: Iran
- Province: Markazi
- County: Khomeyn
- Bakhsh: Central
- Rural District: Galehzan

Population (2006)
  - Total: 15
- Time zone: UTC+3:30 (IRST)
  - Summer (DST): UTC+4:30 (IRDT)

Qaleh-ye Mohammad Beyg (Persian: قلعه محمدبيگ, also Romanized as Qal‘eh-ye Moḩammad Beyg; also known as Qal‘eh-ye Moḩammad Beyk) is a village in Galehzan Rural District, in the Central District of Khomeyn County, Markazi Province, Iran. At the 2006 census, its population was 15, in 5 families.
