= Ashqal =

Ashqal اشقل
- Village
- Location within Iran
- Coordinates: 34°31′33″N 49°34′52″E
- Country: Iran
- Province: Markazi
- County: Farahan
- Bakhsh: Central
- Rural District: Farmahin

Population (2006)
  - Total: 125
- Time zone: UTC+3:30 (IRST)
  - Summer (DST): UTC+4:30 (IRDT)

Ashqal (Persian: اشقل; also known as Askal) is a village in Farmahin Rural District, in the Central District of Farahan County, Markazi Province, Iran. At the 2006 census, its population was 125, in 40 families.
