= Maraq Kan =

Maraq Kan مرق كان
- Village
- Location within Iran
- Coordinates: 34°57′20″N 49°59′21″E
- Country: Iran
- Province: Markazi
- County: Saveh
- Bakhsh: Central
- Rural District: Nur Ali Beyk

Population (2006)
  - Total: 171
- Time zone: UTC+3:30 (IRST)
  - Summer (DST): UTC+4:30 (IRDT)

Maraq Kan (Persian: مرق كان, also Romanized as Maraq Kān) is a village in Nur Ali Beyk Rural District, in the Central District of Saveh County, Markazi Province, Iran. At the 2006 census, its population was 171, in 60 families.
