= Chehel Raz =

Chehel Razز چهل رزرش
- Villageدرر
- Location within Iran
- Coordinates: 33°44′18″N 50°25′33″E
- Country: Iran
- Province: Markaziیهار
- County: Mahallatشر
- Bakhshصدصدصدر: Central
- Rural District: Baqerabad

Population (2006)
  - Total: 96
- Time zone: UTC+3:30 (IRST)
  - Summer (DST): UTC+4:30 (IRDT)

Chehel Raz (Persian: چهل رز) is a village in Baqerabad Rural District, in the Central District of Mahallat County, Markazi Province, Iran. At the 2006 census, its population was 96, in 29 families.
