= Jownush =

Jownush جونوش
- Village
- Location within Iran
- Coordinates: 34°26′46″N 49°38′05″E
- Country: Iran
- Province: Markazi
- County: Farahan
- Bakhsh: Central
- Rural District: Farmahin

Population (2006)
  - Total: 216
- Time zone: UTC+3:30 (IRST)
  - Summer (DST): UTC+4:30 (IRDT)

Jownush (Persian: جونوش, also Romanized as Jownūsh; also known as Jonūsh) is a village in Farmahin Rural District, in the Central District of Farahan County, Markazi Province, Iran. At the 2006 census, its population was 216, in 63 families.
