= Adineh Masjed-e Pain =

Adineh Masjed-e Pain ادينه مسجدپايين
- Village
- Location within Iran
- Coordinates: 33°51′33″N 49°08′25″E
- Country: Iran
- Province: Markazi
- County: Shazand
- Bakhsh: Zalian
- Rural District: Zalian

Population (2006)
  - Total: 105
- Time zone: UTC+3:30 (IRST)
  - Summer (DST): UTC+4:30 (IRDT)

Adineh Masjed-e Pain (Persian: ادينه مسجدپايين, also Romanized as Ādīneh Masjed-e Pā’īn; also known as Ādīneh Masjed-e Soflá) is a village in Zalian Rural District, Zalian District, Shazand County, Markazi Province, Iran. At the 2006 census, its population was 105, in 30 families.
