= Nowdeh-e Hajji Nabi =

Nowdeh-e Hajji Nabi نوده حاجي نبي
- Village
- Location within Iran
- Coordinates: 34°34′05″N 49°45′04″E
- Country: Iran
- Province: Markazi
- County: Farahan
- Bakhsh: Central
- Rural District: Farmahin

Population (2006)
  - Total: 57
- Time zone: UTC+3:30 (IRST)
  - Summer (DST): UTC+4:30 (IRDT)

Nowdeh-e Hajji Nabi (Persian: نوده حاجي نبي, also Romanized as Nowdeh-e Ḩājjī Nabī; also known as Nowdeh and Nowdeh-e Ḩājnabī) is a village in Farmahin Rural District, in the Central District of Farahan County, Markazi Province, Iran. At the 2006 census, its population was 57, in 18 families.
