= Rahzan =

Rahzan راهزان
- Village
- Location within Iran
- Coordinates: 34°11′11″N 49°46′43″E
- Country: Iran
- Province: Markazi
- County: Arak
- Bakhsh: Central
- Rural District: Mashhad-e Miqan

Population (2006)
  - Total: 190
- Time zone: UTC+3:30 (IRST)
  - Summer (DST): UTC+4:30 (IRDT)

Rahzan (Persian: راهزان, also Romanized as Rāhzān and Rāhezān; also known as Rāhizān) is a village in Mashhad-e Miqan Rural District, in the Central District of Arak County, Markazi Province, Iran. At the 2006 census, its population was 190, in 52 families.
