= Rostam Rah =

Rostam Rah رستمراه
- Village
- Location within Iran
- Coordinates: 33°56′34″N 48°59′20″E
- Country: Iran
- Province: Markazi
- County: Shazand
- Bakhsh: Zalian
- Rural District: Zalian

Population (2006)
  - Total: 94
- Time zone: UTC+3:30 (IRST)
  - Summer (DST): UTC+4:30 (IRDT)

Rostam Rah (Persian: رستمراه, also Romanized as Rostam Rāh and Rustamrāh) is a village in Zalian Rural District, Zalian District, Shazand County, Markazi Province, Iran. At the 2006 census, its population was 94, in 22 families.
