= Faqerlu =

Faqerlu فاقرلو
- Village
- Location within Iran
- Coordinates: 33°42′46″N 49°14′51″E
- Country: Iran
- Province: Markazi
- County: Shazand
- Bakhsh: Sarband
- Rural District: Hendudar

Population (2006)
  - Total: 89
- Time zone: UTC+3:30 (IRST)
  - Summer (DST): UTC+4:30 (IRDT)

Faqerlu (Persian: فاقرلو, also Romanized as Fāqerlū; also known as Fāghelū and Fāqehlū) is a village in Hendudar Rural District, Sarband District, Shazand County, Markazi Province, Iran. At the 2006 census, its population was 89, in 23 families.
