= Deh-e Kharabeh Kand =

Deh-e Kharabeh Kand ده خرابه كند
- Village
- Location within Iran
- Coordinates: 33°48′31″N 49°09′25″E
- Country: Iran
- Province: Markazi
- County: Shazand
- Bakhsh: Sarband
- Rural District: Hendudar

Population (2006)
  - Total: 46
- Time zone: UTC+3:30 (IRST)
  - Summer (DST): UTC+4:30 (IRDT)

Deh-e Kharabeh Kand (Persian: ده خرابه كند, also Romanized as Deh-e Kharābeh Kand; also known as Deh-e Kharābeh Kan, Kharābeh Kand, and Kharābeh-ye Kandeh) is a village in Hendudar Rural District, Sarband District, Shazand County, Markazi Province, Iran. At the 2006 census, its population was 46, in 10 families.
