= Morvarid Darreh =

Morvarid Darreh مرواريددره
- Village
- Location within Iran
- Coordinates: 33°58′48″N 49°15′01″E
- Country: Iran
- Province: Markazi
- County: Shazand
- Bakhsh: Zalian
- Rural District: Nahr-e Mian

Population (2006)
  - Total: 497
- Time zone: UTC+3:30 (IRST)
  - Summer (DST): UTC+4:30 (IRDT)

Morvarid Darreh (Persian: مرواريددره, also Romanized as Morvārīd Darreh; also known as Morvārīd and Morvārīdar) is a village in Nahr-e Mian Rural District, Zalian District, Shazand County, Markazi Province, Iran. At the 2006 census, its population was 497, in 131 families.
