= Asiab-e Jelal-e Sofla =

Asiab-e Jelal-e Sofla اسياب جلال سفلي
- Village
- Country: Iran
- Province: Markazi
- County: Tafresh
- Bakhsh: Central
- Rural District: Bazarjan

Population (2006)
  - Total: 80
- Time zone: UTC+3:30 (IRST)
  - Summer (DST): UTC+4:30 (IRDT)

Asiab-e Jelal-e Sofla (Persian: اسياب جلال سفلي, also Romanized as Āsīāb-e Jelāl-e Soflá) is a village in Bazarjan Rural District, in the Central District of Tafresh County, Markazi Province, Iran. At the 2006 census, its population was 80, in 24 families.
