= Qeshlaq-e Abd ol Karim =

Qeshlaq-e Abd ol Karim قشلاق عبدالكريم
- Village
- Location within Iran
- Coordinates: 34°22′08″N 49°07′26″E
- Country: Iran
- Province: Markazi
- County: Khondab
- Bakhsh: Central
- Rural District: Khondab

Population (2006)
  - Total: 275
- Time zone: UTC+3:30 (IRST)
  - Summer (DST): UTC+4:30 (IRDT)

Qeshlaq-e Abd ol Karim (Persian: قشلاق عبدالكريم, also Romanized as Qeshlāq-e ‘Abd ol Karīm) is a village in Khondab Rural District, in the Central District of Khondab County, Markazi Province, Iran. At the 2006 census, its population was 275, in 50 families.
