= Ostuj =

Ostuj استوج
- Village
- Location within Iran
- Coordinates: 34°53′40″N 50°22′07″E
- Country: Iran
- Province: Markazi
- County: Saveh
- Bakhsh: Central
- Rural District: Qareh Chay

Population (2006)
  - Total: 269
- Time zone: UTC+3:30 (IRST)
  - Summer (DST): UTC+4:30 (IRDT)

Ostuj (Persian: استوج, also Romanized as Ostūj) is a village in Qareh Chay Rural District, in the Central District of Saveh County, Markazi Province, Iran. At the 2006 census, its population was 269, in 59 families.
