= Palangab =

Palangab پلنگاب
- Village
- Location within Iran
- Coordinates: 34°20′10″N 49°23′38″E
- Country: Iran
- Province: Markazi
- County: Khondab
- Bakhsh: Qareh Chay
- Rural District: Javersiyan

Population (2006)
  - Total: 29
- Time zone: UTC+3:30 (IRST)
  - Summer (DST): UTC+4:30 (IRDT)

Palangab (Persian: پلنگاب, also Romanized as Palangāb) is a village in Javersiyan Rural District, Qareh Chay District, Khondab County, Markazi Province, Iran. At the 2006 census, its population was 29, in 6 families.
