= Qezel Qash =

Qezel Qash قزل قاش
- Village
- Location within Iran
- Coordinates: 34°51′47″N 49°40′18″E
- Country: Iran
- Province: Markazi
- County: Saveh
- Bakhsh: Nowbaran
- Rural District: Aq Kahriz

Population (2006)
  - Total: 14
- Time zone: UTC+3:30 (IRST)
  - Summer (DST): UTC+4:30 (IRDT)

Qezel Qash (Persian: قزل قاش, also Romanized as Qezel Qāsh; also known as Qīzīlgash) is a village in Aq Kahriz Rural District, Nowbaran District, Saveh County, Markazi Province, Iran. At the 2006 census, its population was 14, in 5 families.
