= Gowjeh Gol =

Gowjeh Gol گوجه گل
- Village
- Location within Iran
- Coordinates: 34°59′21″N 49°46′46″E
- Country: Iran
- Province: Markazi
- County: Tafresh
- Bakhsh: Central
- Rural District: Rudbar

Population (2006)
  - Total: 22
- Time zone: UTC+3:30 (IRST)
  - Summer (DST): UTC+4:30 (IRDT)

Gowjeh Gol (Persian: گوجه گل) is a village in Rudbar Rural District, in the Central District of Tafresh County, Markazi Province, Iran. At the 2006 census, its population was 22, in 8 families.
