= Gol Bedaq =

Gol Bedaq گل بداق
- Village
- Location within Iran
- Coordinates: 33°47′14″N 49°10′28″E
- Country: Iran
- Province: Markazi
- County: Shazand
- Bakhsh: Sarband
- Rural District: Hendudar

Population (2006)
  - Total: 47
- Time zone: UTC+3:30 (IRST)
  - Summer (DST): UTC+4:30 (IRDT)

Gol Bedaq (Persian: گل بداق, also Romanized as Gol Bedāq and Gol Bodāq; also known as Gol Bodāgh, Kolbeh Dāgh, and Kulbadāgh) is a village in Hendudar Rural District, Sarband District, Shazand County, Markazi Province, Iran. At the 2006 census, its population was 47, in 17 families.
