= Majdian =

Majdian مجديان
- Village
- Location within Iran
- Coordinates: 33°42′43″N 50°07′20″E
- Country: Iran
- Province: Markazi
- County: Khomeyn
- Bakhsh: Central
- Rural District: Salehan

Population (2006)
  - Total: 36
- Time zone: UTC+3:30 (IRST)
  - Summer (DST): UTC+4:30 (IRDT)

Majdian (Persian: مجديان, also Romanized as Majdīān, Majdeyān, and Majdiyan) is a village in Salehan Rural District, in the Central District of Khomeyn County, Markazi Province, Iran. At the 2006 census, its population was 36, in 13 families.
