= Vaymand =

Vaymand وايمند
- Village
- Location within Iran
- Coordinates: 34°55′12″N 49°56′36″E
- Country: Iran
- Province: Markazi
- County: Tafresh
- Bakhsh: Central
- Rural District: Bazarjan

Population (2006)
  - Total: 85
- Time zone: UTC+3:30 (IRST)
  - Summer (DST): UTC+4:30 (IRDT)

Vaymand (Persian: وايمند, also Romanized as Vāymand; also known as Wemānd) is a village in Bazarjan Rural District, in the Central District of Tafresh County, Markazi Province, Iran.

== Census ==
As of the 2006 census, its population was 85, with there being 28 families.
