= Michak =

Village in Markazi, Iran

Michak ميچك
- Village
- Location within Iran
- Coordinates: 35°12′19″N 49°48′43″E
- Country: Iran
- Province: Markazi
- County: Saveh
- Bakhsh: Nowbaran
- Rural District: Aq Kahriz

Population (2006)
  - Total: 67
- Time zone: UTC+3:30 (IRST)
  - Summer (DST): UTC+4:30 (IRDT)

Michak (Persian: ميچك, also Romanized as Mīchak; also known as Mishake) is a village in Aq Kahriz Rural District, Nowbaran District, Saveh County, Markazi Province, Iran. At the 2006 census, its population was 67, in 34 families.
