= Adineh Masjed-e Bala =

Adineh Masjed-e Bala آدینه مسجدبالا
- village
- Location within Iran
- Coordinates: 33°52′14″N 49°07′33″E
- Country: Iran
- Province: Markazi
- County: Shazand
- Bakhsh: Zalian
- Rural District: Zalian

Population (2006)
  - Total: 35
- Time zone: UTC+3: 30 (IRST)
  - Summer (DST): UTC+4: 30 (IRDT)

Adineh Masjed-e Bala (Persian: آدینه مسجدبالا, also Romanized as Ādīneh Masjed-e Bālā; also known as Ādīneh and Ādīneh Masjed-e ‘Olyā) is a village in Zalian Rural District, Zalian District, Shazand County, Markazi Province, Iran. At the 2006 census, its population was 35, in 17 families.
