= Selijerd =

Selijerd سلي جرد
- Village
- Location within Iran
- Coordinates: 35°07′52″N 50°16′02″E
- Country: Iran
- Province: Markazi
- County: Saveh
- Bakhsh: Central
- Rural District: Nur Ali Beyk

Population (2006)
  - Total: 49
- Time zone: UTC+3:30 (IRST)
  - Summer (DST): UTC+4:30 (IRDT)

Selijerd (Persian: سلي جرد, also Romanized as Selījerd; also known as Shīlījerd, Sīlī Gerd, Sīlīgīrd, and Sīlījerd) is a village in Nur Ali Beyk Rural District, in the Central District of Saveh County, Markazi Province, Iran. At the 2006 census, its population was 49, in 22 families.
