= Yevlaq =

Yevlaq يولاق
- Village
- Location within Iran
- Coordinates: 35°08′01″N 50°13′09″E
- Country: Iran
- Province: Markazi
- County: Saveh
- Bakhsh: Central
- Rural District: Nur Ali Beyk

Population (2006)
  - Total: 40
- Time zone: UTC+3:30 (IRST)
  - Summer (DST): UTC+4:30 (IRDT)

Yevlaq (Persian: يولاق, also Romanized as Yevlāq) is a village in Nur Ali Beyk Rural District, in the Central District of Saveh County, Markazi Province, Iran. At the 2006 census, its population was 40, in 14 families.
