= Chakhmaq Tappeh =

Chakhmaq Tappeh چخماق تپه
- Village
- Location within Iran
- Coordinates: 34°30′16″N 49°06′01″E
- Country: Iran
- Province: Markazi
- County: Khondab
- Bakhsh: Central
- Rural District: Deh Chal

Population (2006)
  - Total: 108
- Time zone: UTC+3:30 (IRST)
  - Summer (DST): UTC+4:30 (IRDT)

Chakhmaq Tappeh (Persian: چخماق تپه, also Romanized as Chakhmāq Tappeh; also known as Chakhmā and Chakhmagh Tappeh) is a village in Deh Chal Rural District, in the Central District of Khondab County, Markazi Province, Iran. At the 2006 census, its population was 108, in 23 families.

Beyond this region, however, in the foothills of the Alborz Mountains of north-eastern Iran, evidence has emerged that charts the Neolithic transition over a period of 1500 years. Investigations at the twin mounds of Tappeh Sang-e Chakhmaq have revealed pre-pottery and pottery Neolithic occupation in a sequence long enough to document the evolving exploitation of plants and animals leading to the development of a permanent, agro-pastoral community during the eighth to sixth millennia BC. The continuous occupation of this settlement during this crucial transition allows significant changes in lifestyle to be mapped, and provides a new framework for the earliest Neolithic occupation of Iran.
