= Qamar Khun =

Qamar Khun قمارخان
- Village
- Location within Iran
- Coordinates: 33°53′23″N 48°59′24″E
- Country: Iran
- Province: Markazi
- County: Shazand
- Bakhsh: Zalian
- Rural District: Zalian

Population (2006)
  - Total: 66
- Time zone: UTC+3:30 (IRST)
  - Summer (DST): UTC+4:30 (IRDT)

Qamar Khun (Persian: قمارخان, also Romanized as Qamār Khūn; also known as Qal‘eh Samar Khān, Qal‘eh Samūr Khān, and Qal‘eh-ye S̄amūr Khān) is a village in Zalian Rural District, Zalian District, Shazand County, Markazi Province, Iran. At the 2006 census, its population was 66, in 16 families.
