= Shamsabad, Shamsabad =

Shamsabad شمس اباد
- Village
- Location within Iran
- Coordinates: 33°48′56″N 49°44′28″E
- Country: Iran
- Province: Markazi
- County: Arak
- Bakhsh: Central
- Rural District: Shamsabad

Population (2006)
  - Total: 76
- Time zone: UTC+3:30 (IRST)
  - Summer (DST): UTC+4:30 (IRDT)

Shamsabad (Persian: شمس اباد, also Romanized as Shamsābād; also known as Shams Abad Ghareh Kariz) is a village in Shamsabad Rural District, in the Central District of Arak County, Markazi province, Iran. At the 2006 census, its population was 76, in 24 families.
