= Savarabad-e Olya =

Savarabad-e Olya سوارابادعليا
- Village
- Location within Iran
- Coordinates: 33°56′36″N 49°12′56″E
- Country: Iran
- Province: Markazi
- County: Shazand
- Bakhsh: Zalian
- Rural District: Nahr-e Mian

Population (2006)
  - Total: 30
- Time zone: UTC+3:30 (IRST)
  - Summer (DST): UTC+4:30 (IRDT)

Savarabad-e Olya (Persian: سوارابادعليا, also Romanized as Savārābād-e ‘Olyā; also known as Savārābād) is a village in Nahr-e Mian Rural District, Zalian District, Shazand County, Markazi Province, Iran. At the 2006 census, its population was 30, in 13 families.
