= Shaveh, Markazi =

Shaveh شاوه
- Village
- Location within Iran
- Coordinates: 34°27′51″N 49°09′01″E
- Country: Iran
- Province: Markazi
- County: Khondab
- Bakhsh: Central
- Rural District: Khondab

Population (2006)
  - Total: 330
- Time zone: UTC+3:30 (IRST)
  - Summer (DST): UTC+4:30 (IRDT)

Shaveh (Persian: شاوه, also Romanized as Shāveh) is a village in Khondab Rural District, in the Central District of Khondab County, Markazi Province, Iran. At the 2006 census, its population was 330, in 93 families.
