= Chichiabad =

Chichiabad چي چي اباد
- Village
- Location within Iran
- Coordinates: 34°52′40″N 50°30′29″E
- Country: Iran
- Province: Markazi
- County: Saveh
- Bakhsh: Central
- Rural District: Qareh Chay

Population (2006)
  - Total: 15
- Time zone: UTC+3:30 (IRST)
  - Summer (DST): UTC+4:30 (IRDT)

Chichiabad (Persian: چي چي اباد, also Romanized as Chīchīābād and Chichīyābād; also known as Chechīābād, Chīchakābād, and Chīchīkābād) is a village in Qareh Chay Rural District, in the Central District of Saveh County, Markazi Province, Iran. At the 2006 census, its population was 15, in 4 families.
