= Deh-e Mahdi =

Deh-e Mahdi ده مهدي
- Village
- Location within Iran
- Coordinates: 33°49′18″N 49°11′47″E
- Country: Iran
- Province: Markazi
- County: Shazand
- Bakhsh: Sarband
- Rural District: Hendudar

Population (2006)
  - Total: 199
- Time zone: UTC+3:30 (IRST)
  - Summer (DST): UTC+4:30 (IRDT)

Deh-e Mahdi (Persian: ده مهدي, also Romanized as Deh-e Mahdī, Deh-e Mehdī, and Deh Mehdī) is a village in Hendudar Rural District, Sarband District, Shazand County, Markazi Province, Iran. At the 2006 census, its population was 199, in 44 families.
