= Hesar Darreh =

Hesar Darreh حصاردره
- Village
- Location within Iran
- Coordinates: 33°53′28″N 49°09′46″E
- Country: Iran
- Province: Markazi
- County: Shazand
- Bakhsh: Zalian
- Rural District: Zalian

Population (2006)
  - Total: 76
- Time zone: UTC+3:30 (IRST)
  - Summer (DST): UTC+4:30 (IRDT)

Hesar Darreh (Persian: حصاردره, also Romanized as Ḩeşār Darreh; also known as Hasan Darreh and Ḩeşār Deh) is a village in Zalian Rural District, Zalian District, Shazand County, Markazi Province, Iran. At the 2006 census, its population was 76, in 23 families.
