= Sar Kamari =

Sar Kamari سركمري
- Village
- Location within Iran
- Coordinates: 33°55′30″N 48°59′26″E
- Country: Iran
- Province: Markazi
- County: Shazand
- Bakhsh: Zalian
- Rural District: Zalian

Population (2006)
  - Total: 73
- Time zone: UTC+3:30 (IRST)
  - Summer (DST): UTC+4:30 (IRDT)

Sar Kamari (Persian: سركمري, also Romanized as Sar Kamarī; also known as Sar Khemrī) is a village in Zalian Rural District, Zalian District, Shazand County, Markazi Province, Iran. At the 2006 census, its population was 73, in 20 families.
