= Teymur Qash =

Teymur Qash تيمورقاش
- Village
- Location within Iran
- Coordinates: 35°03′45″N 49°18′10″E
- Country: Iran
- Province: Markazi
- County: Saveh
- Bakhsh: Nowbaran
- Rural District: Bayat

Population (2006)
  - Total: 72
- Time zone: UTC+3:30 (IRST)
  - Summer (DST): UTC+4:30 (IRDT)

Teymur Qash (Persian: تيمورقاش, also Romanized as Teymūr Qāsh) is a village in Bayat Rural District, Nowbaran District, Saveh County, Markazi Province, Iran. At the 2006 census, its population was 72, in 18 families.
