= Darreh Piri =

Darreh Piri دره پيري
- Village
- Location within Iran
- Coordinates: 33°53′57″N 49°02′26″E
- Country: Iran
- Province: Markazi
- County: Shazand
- Bakhsh: Zalian
- Rural District: Zalian

Population (2006)
  - Total: 71
- Time zone: UTC+3:30 (IRST)
  - Summer (DST): UTC+4:30 (IRDT)

Darreh Piri (Persian: دره پيري, also Romanized as Darreh Pīrī) is a village in Zalian Rural District, Zalian District, Shazand County, Markazi Province, Iran. At the 2006 census, its population was 71, in 26 families.
