= Mesrlu =

Mesrlu مصرلو
- Village
- Location within Iran
- Coordinates: 33°40′18″N 49°12′44″E
- Country: Iran
- Province: Markazi
- County: Shazand
- Bakhsh: Sarband
- Rural District: Hendudar

Population (2006)
  - Total: 82
- Time zone: UTC+3:30 (IRST)
  - Summer (DST): UTC+4:30 (IRDT)

Mesrlu (Persian: مصرلو, also Romanized as Meşrlū and Meşerlū; also known as Masleh and Messeleh) is a village in Hendudar Rural District, Sarband District, Shazand County, Markazi Province, Iran. At the 2006 census, the population was 82, in sixteen families.
