= Alvijan =

Alvijan الويجان
- Village
- Location within Iran
- Coordinates: 34°42′48″N 49°59′35″E
- Country: Iran
- Province: Markazi
- County: Tafresh
- Bakhsh: Central
- Rural District: Bazarjan

Population (2006)
  - Total: 122
- Time zone: UTC+3:30 (IRST)
  - Summer (DST): UTC+4:30 (IRDT)

Alvijan (Persian: الويجان, also Romanized as Alvījān) is a village in Bazarjan Rural District, in the Central District of Tafresh County, Markazi Province, Iran. At the 2006 census, its population was 122, in 41 families.
