= Morvar =

Morvar مروار
- Village
- Location within Iran
- Coordinates: 33°42′45″N 49°11′17″E
- Country: Iran
- Province: Markazi
- County: Shazand
- Bakhsh: Sarband
- Rural District: Hendudar

Population (2006)
  - Total: 216
- Time zone: UTC+3:30 (IRST)
  - Summer (DST): UTC+4:30 (IRDT)

Morvar (Persian: مروار, also Romanized as Morvār and Marwār) is a village in Hendudar Rural District, Sarband District, Shazand County, Markazi Province, Iran. At the 2006 census, its population was 216, in 64 families.
