= Qaleh-ye Farhadiyeh =

Qaleh-ye Farhadiyeh قلعه فرهاديه
- Village
- Location within Iran
- Coordinates: 33°31′26″N 49°58′26″E
- Country: Iran
- Province: Markazi
- County: Khomeyn
- Bakhsh: Central
- Rural District: Rostaq

Population (2006)
  - Total: 19
- Time zone: UTC+3:30 (IRST)
  - Summer (DST): UTC+4:30 (IRDT)

Qaleh-ye Farhadiyeh (Persian: قلعه فرهاديه, also Romanized as Qal‘eh-ye Farhādīyeh; also known as Farhādīyeh) is a village in Rostaq Rural District, in the Central District of Khomeyn County, Markazi Province, Iran. At the 2006 census, its population was 19, in 5 families.
