= Nafis =

Nafis نفيس
- Village
- Location within Iran
- Coordinates: 33°41′09″N 50°18′14″E
- Country: Iran
- Province: Markazi
- County: Khomeyn
- Bakhsh: Central
- Rural District: Galehzan

Population (2006)
  - Total: 73
- Time zone: UTC+3:30 (IRST)
  - Summer (DST): UTC+4:30 (IRDT)

Nafis (Persian: نفيس, also Romanized as Nafīs) is a village in Galehzan Rural District, in the Central District of Khomeyn County, Markazi Province, Iran. At the 2006 census, its population was 73, in 26 families.
