= Imanlu =

Imanlu ايمانلو
- Village
- Location within Iran
- Coordinates: 33°43′43″N 49°15′43″E
- Country: Iran
- Province: Markazi
- County: Shazand
- Bakhsh: Sarband
- Rural District: Hendudar

Population (2006)
  - Total: 161
- Time zone: UTC+3:30 (IRST)
  - Summer (DST): UTC+4:30 (IRDT)

Imanlu (Persian: ايمانلو, also Romanized as Īmānlū) is a village in Hendudar Rural District, Sarband District, Shazand County, Markazi Province, Iran. At the 2006 census, its population was 161, in 38 families.
