= Chalfakhreh =

Chalfakhreh چال فخره
- Village
- Location within Iran
- Coordinates: 35°12′04″N 49°29′02″E
- Country: Iran
- Province: Markazi
- County: Saveh
- Bakhsh: Nowbaran
- Rural District: Kuhpayeh

Population (2006)
  - Total: 65
- Time zone: UTC+3:30 (IRST)
  - Summer (DST): UTC+4:30 (IRDT)

Chalfakhreh (Persian: چال فخره, also Romanized as Chālfakhreh; also known as Chahār Ferqeh and Chehār Farkheh) is a village in Kuhpayeh Rural District, Nowbaran District, Saveh County, Markazi Province, Iran. At the 2006 census, its population was 65, in 29 families.
