= Gujeh Menar =

Gujeh Menar گوجه منار
- Village
- Location within Iran
- Coordinates: 35°06′24″N 49°31′57″E
- Country: Iran
- Province: Markazi
- County: Saveh
- Bakhsh: Nowbaran
- Rural District: Bayat

Population (2006)
  - Total: 57
- Time zone: UTC+3:30 (IRST)
  - Summer (DST): UTC+4:30 (IRDT)

Gujeh Menar (Persian: گوجه منار, also Romanized as Gūjeh Menār; also known as Gūgjeh Menār) is a village in Bayat Rural District, Nowbaran District, Saveh County, Markazi Province, Iran. At the 2006 census, its population was 57, in 13 families.
