= Badam Chaloq =

Badam Chaloq بادام چالق
- Village
- Location within Iran
- Coordinates: 35°14′20″N 49°52′34″E
- Country: Iran
- Province: Markazi
- County: Saveh
- Bakhsh: Nowbaran
- Rural District: Aq Kahriz

Population (2006)
  - Total: 273
- Time zone: UTC+3:30 (IRST)
  - Summer (DST): UTC+4:30 (IRDT)

Badam Chaloq (Persian: بادام چالق, also Romanized as Bādām Chāloq; also known as Badam Chalegh and Bādām Chālūq) is a village in Aq Kahriz Rural District, Nowbaran District, Saveh County, Markazi Province, Iran. As of the 2006 census, its population was 273, in 91 families.
