= Qezelqash =

Qezelqash قزلقاش
- Village
- Location within Iran
- Coordinates: 35°16′49″N 49°44′24″E
- Country: Iran
- Province: Markazi
- County: Tafresh
- Bakhsh: Central
- Rural District: Rudbar

Population (2006)
  - Total: 107
- Time zone: UTC+3:30 (IRST)
  - Summer (DST): UTC+4:30 (IRDT)

Qezelqash (Persian: قزلقاش, also Romanized as Qezelqāsh) is a village in Rudbar Rural District, in the Central District of Tafresh County, Markazi Province, Iran. At the 2006 census, its population was 107, in 26 families.
