= Burqan =

Burqan بورقان
- Village
- Location within Iran
- Coordinates: 34°25′47″N 49°39′30″E
- Country: Iran
- Province: Markazi
- County: Farahan
- Bakhsh: Central
- Rural District: Farmahin

Population (2006)
  - Total: 290
- Time zone: UTC+3:30 (IRST)
  - Summer (DST): UTC+4:30 (IRDT)

Burqan (Persian: بورقان, also Romanized as Būrqān; also known as Bāzīkūn, Borqān, and Buzqān) is a village in Farmahin Rural District, in the Central District of Farahan County, Markazi Province, Iran. At the 2006 census, its population was 290, in 85 families.
