= Qeshlaq-e Qiyujik =

Qeshlaq-e Qiyujik قشلاق قيوجيك
- Village
- Location within Iran
- Coordinates: 34°56′49″N 50°05′32″E
- Country: Iran
- Province: Markazi
- County: Saveh
- Bakhsh: Central
- Rural District: Nur Ali Beyk

Population (2006)
  - Total: 118
- Time zone: UTC+3:30 (IRST)
  - Summer (DST): UTC+4:30 (IRDT)

Qeshlaq-e Qiyujik (Persian: قشلاق قيوجيك, also Romanized as Qeshlāq-e Qīyūjīk; also known as Qeshlāq-e Qūyūjāq, Qīyūjīk, and Shūr Qū’ī) is a village in Nur Ali Beyk Rural District, in the Central District of Saveh County, Markazi Province, Iran. At the 2006 census, its population was 118, in 21 families.
