= Arzaqan =

Arzaqan ارزقان
- Village
- Location within Iran
- Coordinates: 33°40′35″N 50°06′02″E
- Country: Iran
- Province: Markazi
- County: Khomeyn
- Bakhsh: Central
- Rural District: Salehan

Population (2006)
  - Total: 15
- Time zone: UTC+3:30 (IRST)
  - Summer (DST): UTC+4:30 (IRDT)

Arzaqan (Persian: ارزقان, Romanized as Arzaqān; also known as Arzaghān and Arzoghān) is a village in Salehan Rural District, in the Central District of Khomeyn County, Markazi Province, Iran. At the 2006 census, its population was 15, in 4 families.
