= Mansur Khvajeh =

Mansur Khvajeh منصورخواجه
- Village
- Location within Iran
- Coordinates: 33°42′28″N 50°05′04″E
- Country: Iran
- Province: Markazi
- County: Khomeyn
- Bakhsh: Central
- Rural District: Hamzehlu

Population (2006)
  - Total: 27
- Time zone: UTC+3:30 (IRST)
  - Summer (DST): UTC+4:30 (IRDT)

Mansur Khvajeh (Persian: منصورخواجه, also Romanized as Manşūr Khvājeh; also known as Mansoor Khajeh) is a village in Hamzehlu Rural District, in the Central District of Khomeyn County, Markazi Province, Iran. At the 2006 census, its population was 27, in 6 families.
