= Feyzi Hasan =

Feyzi Hasan فيضي حسن
- Village
- Location within Iran
- Coordinates: 33°38′52″N 50°00′14″E
- Country: Iran
- Province: Markazi
- County: Khomeyn
- Bakhsh: Kamareh
- Rural District: Khorram Dasht

Population (2006)
  - Total: 50
- Time zone: UTC+3:30 (IRST)
  - Summer (DST): UTC+4:30 (IRDT)

Feyzi Hasan (Persian: فيضي حسن, also Romanized as Feyẕī Ḩasan; also known as Feiz Hosein) is a village in Khorram Dasht Rural District, Kamareh District, Khomeyn County, Markazi Province, Iran. At the 2006 census, its population was 50, in 13 families.
