= Kuksigerd =

Kuksigerd كوك سيگرد
- Village
- Interactive map of Kuksigerd
- Coordinates: 34°48′19″N 49°39′54″E
- Country: Iran
- Province: Markazi
- County: Tafresh
- Bakhsh: Central
- Rural District: Rudbar

Population (2006)
  - Total: 93
- Time zone: UTC+3:30 (IRST)
  - Summer (DST): UTC+4:30 (IRDT)

Kuksigerd (Persian: كوك سيگرد, also Romanized as Kūksīgerd) is a village in Rudbar Rural District, in the Central District of Tafresh County, Markazi Province, Iran. At the 2006 census, its population was 93, in 21 families.
