= Arjanavand =

Arjanavand ارجناوند
- Village
- Location within Iran
- Coordinates: 34°20′46″N 49°20′18″E
- Country: Iran
- Province: Markazi
- County: Khondab
- Bakhsh: Qareh Chay
- Rural District: Javersiyan

Population (2006)
  - Total: 359
- Time zone: UTC+3:30 (IRST)
  - Summer (DST): UTC+4:30 (IRDT)

Arjanavand (Persian: ارجناوند, also romanized as Arjanāvand, Arjanāwand, and Arjenāvand) is a village in Javersiyan Rural District, Qareh Chay District, Khondab County, Markazi Province, Iran. At the 2006 census, its population was 359, in 84 families.
