= Tahereh Khatun =

Tahereh Khatun طاهره خاتون
- Village
- Location within Iran
- Coordinates: 35°05′41″N 49°43′05″E
- Country: Iran
- Province: Markazi
- County: Saveh
- Bakhsh: Nowbaran
- Rural District: Bayat

Population (2006)
  - Total: 259
- Time zone: UTC+3:30 (IRST)
  - Summer (DST): UTC+4:30 (IRDT)

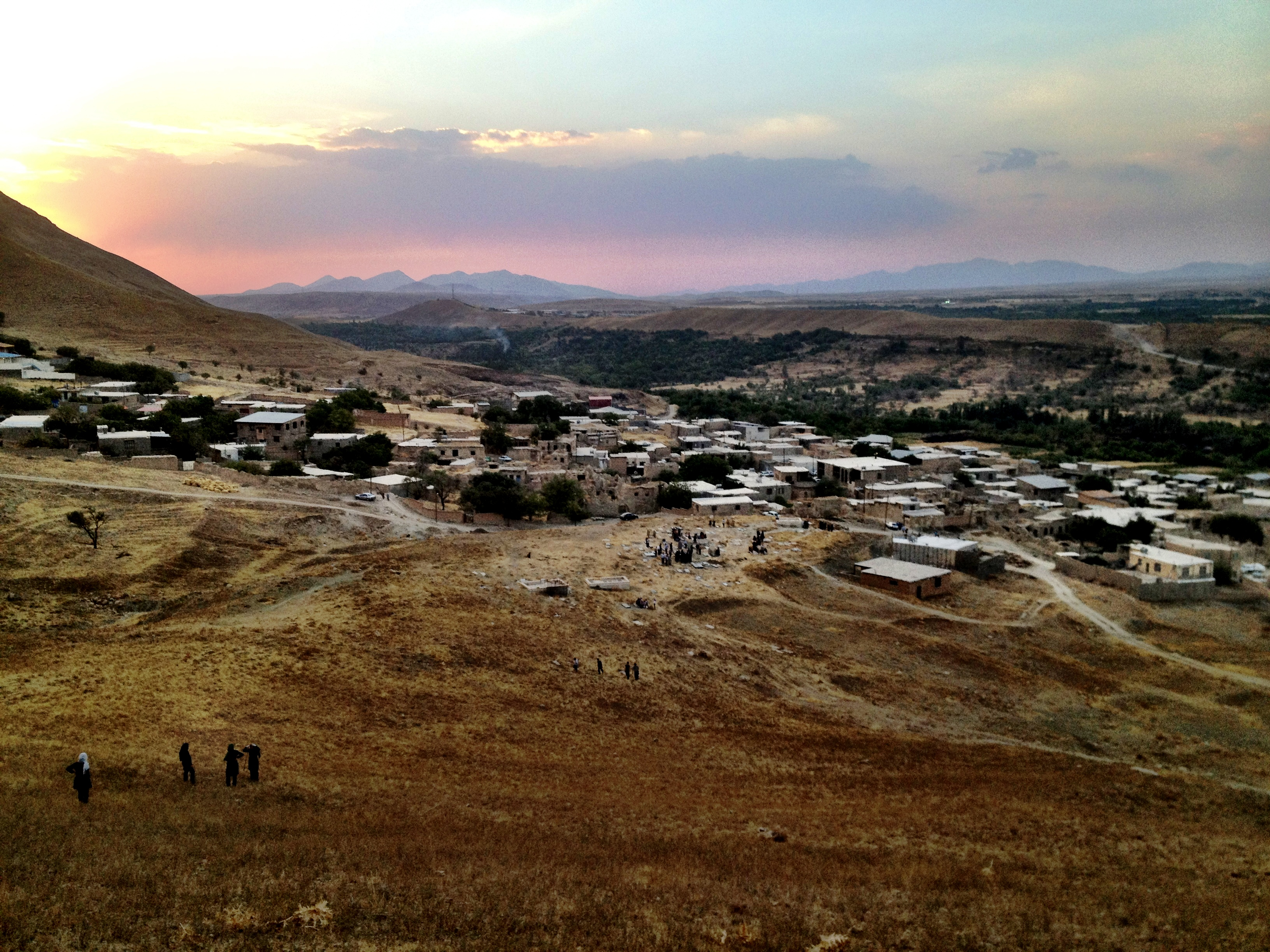
Tahereh Khatun

Tahereh Khatun (Persian: طاهره خاتون, also Romanized as Ţāhereh Khātūn; also known as Tafrakaman) is a village in Bayat Rural District, Nowbaran District, Saveh County, Markazi Province, Iran. At the 2006 census, its population was 259, in 105 families.
