= Kamal Saleh =

Kamal Saleh كمال صالح
- Village
- Location within Iran
- Coordinates: 33°37′58″N 49°17′15″E
- Country: Iran
- Province: Markazi
- County: Shazand
- Bakhsh: Sarband
- Rural District: Hendudar

Population (2006)
  - Total: 37
- Time zone: UTC+3:30 (IRST)
  - Summer (DST): UTC+4:30 (IRDT)

Kamal Saleh (Persian: كمال صالح, also Romanized as Kamāl Şāleḩ; also known as Kamān-e Şāleḩī) is a village in Hendudar Rural District, Sarband District, Shazand County, Markazi Province, Iran. At the 2006 census, its population was 37, in 8 families.
