= Ezz od Din =

Ezz od Din عزالدين
- Village
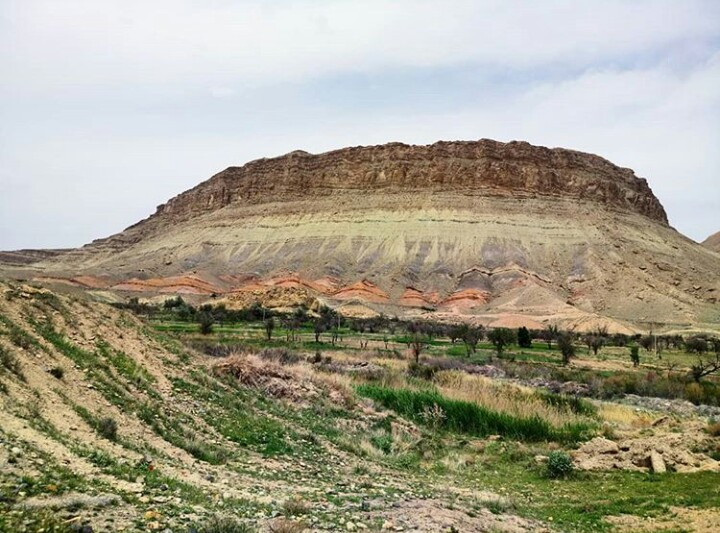
- Ezoddin river

- Location within Iran
- Coordinates: 34°52′15″N 49°54′00″E
- Country: Iran
- Province: Markazi
- County: Tafresh
- Bakhsh: Central
- Rural District: Bazarjan

Population (2006)
  - Total: 192
- Time zone: UTC+3:30 (IRST)
  - Summer (DST): UTC+4:30 (IRDT)

Ezz od Din (Persian: عزالدين, also Romanized as ‘Ezz od Dīn, ‘Azzaddīn, and ‘Azz od Dīn) is a village in Bazarjan Rural District, in the Central District of Tafresh County, Markazi Province, Iran. At the 2006 census, its population was 192, in 65 families.
