= Qiajik =

Qiajik قياجيك
- Village
- Location within Iran
- Coordinates: 35°02′05″N 49°58′36″E
- Country: Iran
- Province: Markazi
- County: Saveh
- Bakhsh: Central
- Rural District: Shahsavan Kandi

Population (2006)
  - Total: 43
- Time zone: UTC+3:30 (IRST)
  - Summer (DST): UTC+4:30 (IRDT)

Qiajik (Persian: قياجيك, also Romanized as Qīājīk; also known as Qayeh Jīk) is a village in Shahsavan Kandi Rural District, in the Central District of Saveh County, Markazi Province, Iran. At the 2006 census, its population was 43, in 11 families.
