= Hariqan =

Hariqan حريقان
- Village
- Location within Iran
- Coordinates: 35°19′51″N 49°36′03″E
- Country: Iran
- Province: Markazi
- County: Saveh
- Bakhsh: Nowbaran
- Rural District: Kuhpayeh

Population (2006)
  - Total: 81
- Time zone: UTC+3:30 (IRST)
  - Summer (DST): UTC+4:30 (IRDT)

Hariqan (Persian: حريقان, also Romanized as Ḩarīqān; also known as Ḩareqān, Ḩarīfān, and Harighan) is a village in Kuhpayeh Rural District, Nowbaran District, Saveh County, Markazi Province, Iran. As of the 2006 census, its population was 81 with 28 families.
