= Tirazabad =

Tirazabad طيرزاباد
- Village
- Location within Iran
- Coordinates: 34°52′29″N 49°42′38″E
- Country: Iran
- Province: Markazi
- County: Tafresh
- Bakhsh: Central
- Rural District: Rudbar

Population (2006)
  - Total: 63
- Time zone: UTC+3:30 (IRST)
  - Summer (DST): UTC+4:30 (IRDT)

Tirazabad (Persian: طيرزاباد, also Romanized as Ţīrazābād; also known as Ţarīzābād, Terīzābād, Tīrīzābād, and Tirjābād) is a village in Rudbar Rural District, in the Central District of Tafresh County, Markazi Province, Iran. At the 2006 census, its population was 63, in 14 families.
