= Dadamraz =

Dadamraz دادمرز
- Village
- Location within Iran
- Coordinates: 34°42′05″N 50°00′35″E
- Country: Iran
- Province: Markazi
- County: Tafresh
- Bakhsh: Central
- Rural District: Bazarjan

Population (2006)
  - Total: 143
- Time zone: UTC+3:30 (IRST)
  - Summer (DST): UTC+4:30 (IRDT)

Dadamraz (Persian: دادمرز, also Romanized as Dādamraz; also known as Dādamras) is a village in Bazarjan Rural District, in the Central District of Tafresh County, Markazi Province, Iran. At the 2006 census, its population was 143, in 53 families.
