= Revesht =

Revesht روشت
- Village
- Location within Iran
- Coordinates: 33°42′01″N 49°10′40″E
- Country: Iran
- Province: Markazi
- County: Shazand
- Bakhsh: Sarband
- Rural District: Hendudar

Population (2006)
  - Total: 125
- Time zone: UTC+3:30 (IRST)
  - Summer (DST): UTC+4:30 (IRDT)

Revesht (Persian: روشت, also Romanized as Ravesht) is a village in Hendudar Rural District, Sarband District, Shazand County, Markazi Province, Iran. At the 2006 census, its population was 125, in 33 families.
