= Bilaq =

Bilaq بيلاق
- Village
- Location within Iran
- Coordinates: 33°35′38″N 50°01′31″E
- Country: Iran
- Province: Markazi
- County: Khomeyn
- Bakhsh: Central
- Rural District: Rostaq

Population (2006)
  - Total: 73
- Time zone: UTC+3:30 (IRST)
  - Summer (DST): UTC+4:30 (IRDT)

Bilaq (Persian: بيلاق, also Romanized as Bīlāq, Bailāq, and Beylāq; also known as Bīlāgh) is a village in Rostaq Rural District, in the Central District of Khomeyn County, Markazi Province, Iran. At the 2006 census, its population was 73, in 23 families.
