= Esfanjeh =

Esfanjeh اسفنجه
- Village
- Location within Iran
- Coordinates: 33°40′00″N 50°03′14″E
- Country: Iran
- Province: Markazi
- County: Khomeyn
- Bakhsh: Kamareh
- Rural District: Khorram Dasht

Population (2006)
  - Total: 208
- Time zone: UTC+3:30 (IRST)
  - Summer (DST): UTC+4:30 (IRDT)

Esfanjeh (Persian: اسفنجه; also known as Isfanjeh and Esfanjak) is a village in Khorram Dasht Rural District, Kamareh District, Khomeyn County, Markazi Province, Iran. At the 2006 census, its population was 208, in 53 families.
