= Flujerd =

Flujerd فلوجرد
- Village
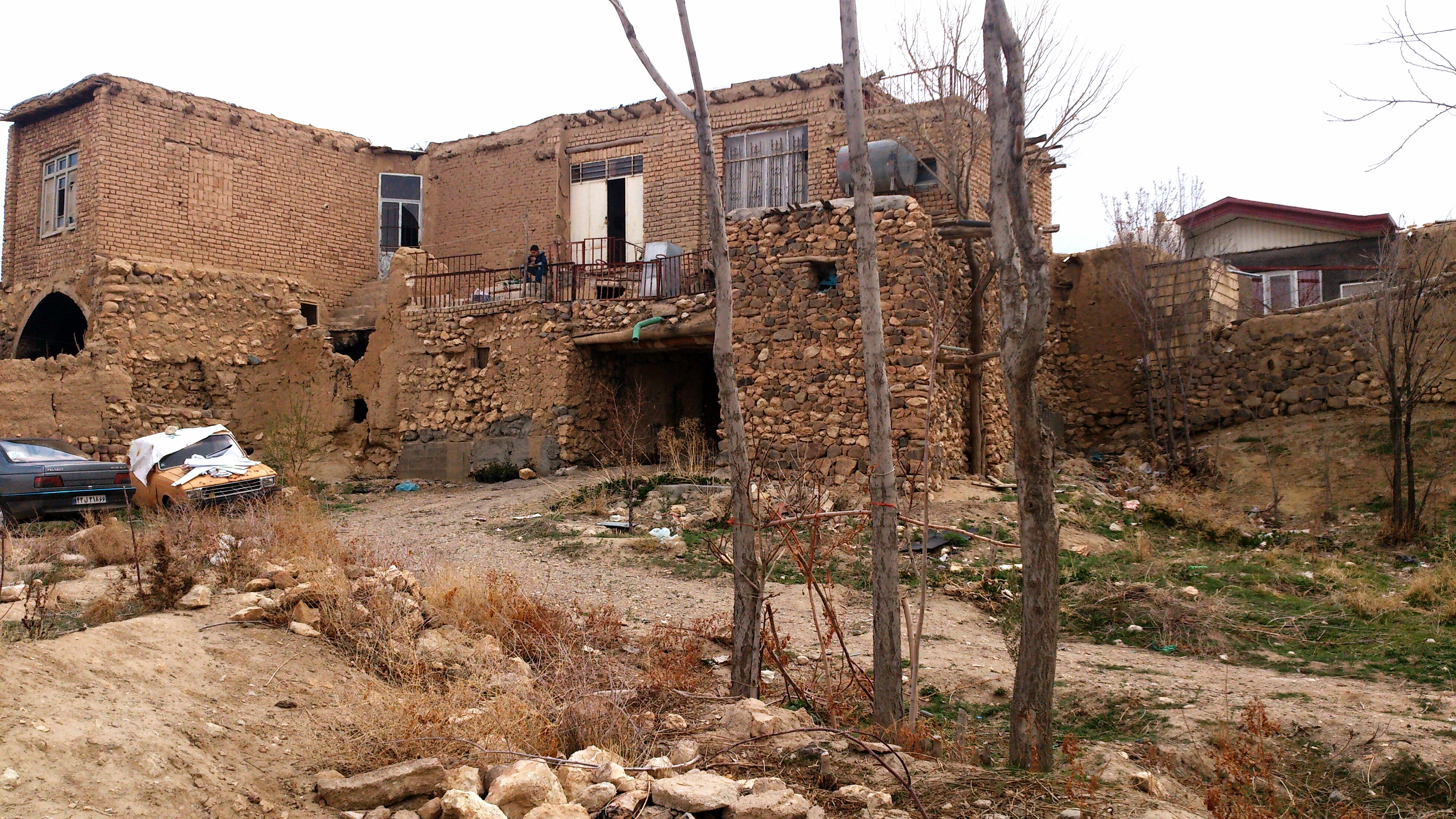

- Location within Iran
- Coordinates: 34°51′27″N 49°50′06″E
- Country: Iran
- Province: Markazi
- County: Tafresh
- Bakhsh: Central
- Rural District: Rudbar

Population (2006)
  - Total: 81
- Time zone: UTC+3:30 (IRST)
  - Summer (DST): UTC+4:30 (IRDT)

Flujerd (Persian: فلوجرد, also Romanized as Flūjerd) is a village in Rudbar Rural District, in the Central District of Tafresh County, Markazi Province, Iran. At the 2006 census, its population was 81, in 25 families.
