= Sarshekaf =

Sarshekaf سرشكاف
- Village
- Location within Iran
- Coordinates: 35°03′36″N 50°22′59″E
- Country: Iran
- Province: Markazi
- County: Saveh
- Bakhsh: Central
- Rural District: Taraznahid

Population (2006)
  - Total: 10
- Time zone: UTC+3:30 (IRST)
  - Summer (DST): UTC+4:30 (IRDT)

Sarshekaf (Persian: سرشكاف, also Romanized as Sarshekāf) is a village in Taraznahid Rural District, in the Central District of Saveh County, Markazi Province, Iran. As of the 2006 census, its population was four families containing ten people total.
