= Qaleh-ye Ahmad Beyk =

Qaleh-ye Ahmad Beyk قلعه احمدبيك
- Village
- Location within Iran
- Coordinates: 35°07′00″N 49°44′00″E
- Country: Iran
- Province: Markazi
- County: Saveh
- Bakhsh: Nowbaran
- Rural District: Bayat

Population (2006)
  - Total: 81
- Time zone: UTC+3:30 (IRST)
  - Summer (DST): UTC+4:30 (IRDT)

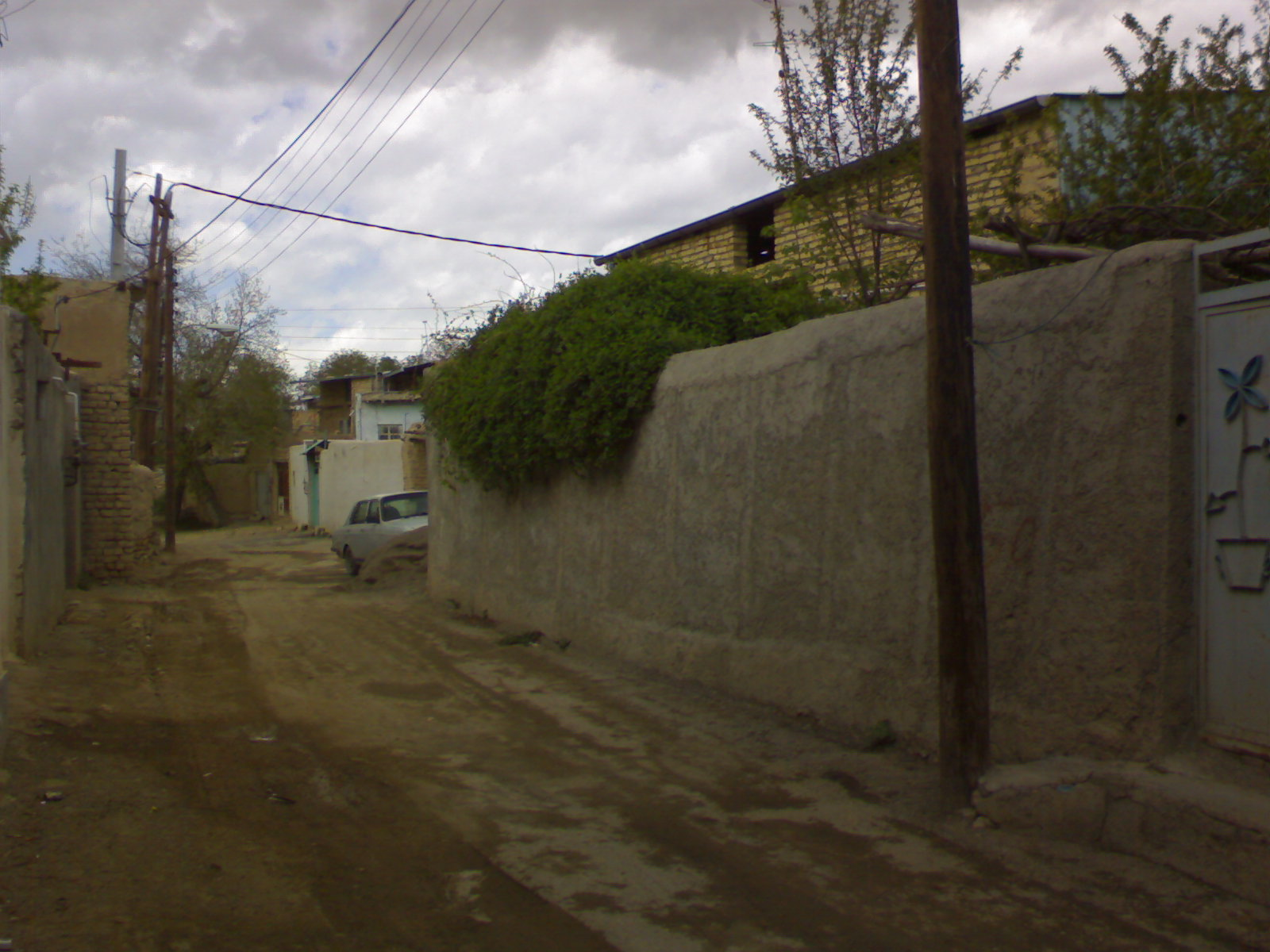
Qaleh-ye Ahmad Beyk in springtime

Qaleh-ye Ahmad Beyk (Persian: قلعه احمدبيك, also Romanized as Qal‘eh-ye Aḩmad Beyk) is a village in Bayat Rural District, Nowbaran District, Saveh County, Markazi Province, Iran. At the 2006 census, its population was 81, in 39 families.
