= Razgardan =

Razgardan رازگردان
- Village
- Location within Iran
- Coordinates: 34°26′25″N 49°15′40″E
- Country: Iran
- Province: Markazi
- County: Khondab
- Bakhsh: Central
- Rural District: Khondab

Population (2006)
  - Total: 440
- Time zone: UTC+3:30 (IRST)
  - Summer (DST): UTC+4:30 (IRDT)

Razgardan (Persian: رازگردان, also Romanized as Rāzgardān, Rāz Gardān, Rāzgardan, and Razgordān; also known as Rāstgerdān, Rast Gordan, and Rāstgordān) is a village in Khondab Rural District, in the Central District of Khondab County, Markazi Province, Iran. At the 2006 census, its population was 440, in 99 families.
