= Azad Marzabad =

Azad Marzabad ازادمرزاباد
- Village
- Location within Iran
- Coordinates: 34°11′36″N 49°42′20″E
- Country: Iran
- Province: Markazi
- County: Arak
- Bakhsh: Central
- Rural District: Mashhad-e Miqan

Population (2006)
  - Total: 213
- Time zone: UTC+3:30 (IRST)
  - Summer (DST): UTC+4:30 (IRDT)

Azad Marzabad (Persian: ازادمرزاباد, also Romanized as Āzād Marzābād) is a village in Mashhad-e Miqan Rural District, in the Central District of Arak County, Markazi Province, Iran. At the 2006 census, its population was 213, in 63 families.
