= Areklu =

Areklu اركلو
- Village
- Location within Iran
- Coordinates: 33°44′23″N 49°13′37″E
- Country: Iran
- Province: Markazi
- County: Shazand
- Bakhsh: Sarband
- Rural District: Hendudar

Population (2006)
  - Total: 107
- Time zone: UTC+3:30 (IRST)
  - Summer (DST): UTC+4:30 (IRDT)

Areklu (Persian: اركلو, also Romanized as 'Areklū; also known as Arīglū and Arīklū) is a village in Hendudar Rural District, Sarband District, Shazand County, Markazi Province, Iran. At the 2006 census, its population was 107, in 29 families.
