= Sar Taq, Markazi =

Sar Taq سرطاق
- Village
- Location within Iran
- Coordinates: 33°41′14″N 50°03′04″E
- Country: Iran
- Province: Markazi
- County: Khomeyn
- Bakhsh: Central
- Rural District: Hamzehlu

Population (2006)
  - Total: 192
- Time zone: UTC+3:30 (IRST)
  - Summer (DST): UTC+4:30 (IRDT)

Sar Taq (Persian: سرطاق, also Romanized as Sar Ţāq; also known as Sar Tagh) is a village in Hamzehlu Rural District, in the Central District of Khomeyn County, Markazi Province, Iran. At the 2006 census, its population was 192, in 50 families.
