= Ashianak =

Ashianak اشيانك
- Village
- Location within Iran
- Coordinates: 35°01′21″N 49°55′42″E
- Country: Iran
- Province: Markazi
- County: Saveh
- Bakhsh: Central
- Rural District: Shahsavan Kandi

Population (2006)
  - Total: 32
- Time zone: UTC+3:30 (IRST)
  - Summer (DST): UTC+4:30 (IRDT)

Ashianak (Persian: اشيانك, also Romanized as Āshīānak and Āshyānak; also known as Ashnak) is a village in Shahsavan Kandi Rural District, in the Central District of Saveh County, Markazi Province, Iran. At the 2006 census, its population was 32, in 13 families.
