= Ab Bakhshan, Markazi =

Ab Bakhshan اب بخشان
- Village
- Location in Iran
- Coordinates: 33°50′23″N 49°02′56″E
- Country: Iran
- Province: Markazi
- County: Shazand
- Bakhsh: Sarband
- Rural District: Malmir

Population (2006)
  - Total: 127
- Time zone: UTC+3:30 (IRST)
  - Summer (DST): UTC+4:30 (IRDT)

Ab Bakhshan (Persian: اب بخشان, also Romanized as Āb Bakhshān; also known as Ābakhshīān) is a village in Malmir Rural District, Sarband District, Shazand County, Markazi Province, Iran. At the 2006 census, its population was 127, in 36 families.
