= Dar Anjir =

Dar Anjir دارانجير
- Village
- Location within Iran
- Coordinates: 34°19′55″N 49°10′04″E
- Country: Iran
- Province: Markazi
- County: Khondab
- Bakhsh: Central
- Rural District: Khondab

Population (2006)
  - Total: 154
- Time zone: UTC+3:30 (IRST)
  - Summer (DST): UTC+4:30 (IRDT)

Dar Anjir (Persian: دارانجير, also romanized as Dār Anjīr) is a village in Khondab Rural District, in the Central District of Khondab County, Markazi Province, Iran. At the 2006 census, its population was 154, in 34 families.
