= Deh-e Zaman =

Deh-e Zaman ده زمان
- Village
- Location within Iran
- Coordinates: 33°43′36″N 49°16′09″E
- Country: Iran
- Province: Markazi
- County: Shazand
- Bakhsh: Sarband
- Rural District: Hendudar

Population (2006)
  - Total: 95
- Time zone: UTC+3:30 (IRST)
  - Summer (DST): UTC+4:30 (IRDT)

Deh-e Zaman (Persian: ده زمان, also Romanized as Deh-e Zamān and Deh Zamān) is a village in Hendudar Rural District, Sarband District, Shazand County, Markazi Province, Iran. As per the 2006 census, its population was 95, with 19 families.
