= Kordak =

Kordak كردك
- Village
- Location within Iran
- Coordinates: 35°05′56″N 49°33′22″E
- Country: Iran
- Province: Markazi
- County: Saveh
- Bakhsh: Nowbaran
- Rural District: Bayat

Population (2006)
  - Total: 47
- Time zone: UTC+3:30 (IRST)
  - Summer (DST): UTC+4:30 (IRDT)

Kordak (Persian: كردك, also Romanized as Kardak and Karodak) is a village in Bayat Rural District, Nowbaran District, Saveh County, Markazi Province, Iran. At the 2006 census, its population was 47, in 13 families.
