= Gachlu =

Gachlu گچلو
- Village
- Location within Iran
- Coordinates: 33°43′42″N 49°14′56″E
- Country: Iran
- Province: Markazi
- County: Shazand
- Bakhsh: Sarband
- Rural District: Hendudar

Population (2006)
  - Total: 169
- Time zone: UTC+3:30 (IRST)
  - Summer (DST): UTC+4:30 (IRDT)

Gachlu (Persian: گچلو, also Romanized as Gachlū and Gachalū; also known as Gecherlū, Kachalū, and Kechalu) is a village in Hendudar Rural District, Sarband District, Shazand County, Markazi Province, Iran. At the 2006 census, its population was 169, in 35 families.
