= Kholuzin =

Kholuzin خلوزين
- Village
- Location within Iran
- Coordinates: 34°31′49″N 49°05′03″E
- Country: Iran
- Province: Markazi
- County: Khondab
- Bakhsh: Central
- Rural District: Deh Chal

Population (2006)
  - Total: 191
- Time zone: UTC+3:30 (IRST)
  - Summer (DST): UTC+4:30 (IRDT)

Kholuzin (Persian: خلوزين, also Romanized as Kholūzīn, Khaloozīn, Khelowzīn, and Kholowzīn; also known as Klujīn) is a village in Deh Chal Rural District, in the Central District of Khondab County, Markazi Province, Iran. At the 2006 census, its population was 191, in 45 families.
