= Qeshlaq-e Hoseynabad =

Qeshlaq-e Hoseynabad قشلاق حسين اباد
- Village
- Location within Iran
- Coordinates: 34°53′25″N 50°24′52″E
- Country: Iran
- Province: Markazi
- County: Saveh
- Bakhsh: Central
- Rural District: Qareh Chay

Population (2006)
  - Total: 50
- Time zone: UTC+3:30 (IRST)
  - Summer (DST): UTC+4:30 (IRDT)

Qeshlaq-e Hoseynabad (Persian: قشلاق حسين اباد, also Romanized as Qeshlāq-e Ḩoseynābād and Qeshlāq Ḩoseynābād) is a village in Qareh Chay Rural District, in the Central District of Saveh County, Markazi Province, Iran. At the 2006 census, its population was 50, in 14 families.
