= Ashmesian =

Ashmesian آشمسيان
- village
- Location within Iran
- Coordinates: 33°34′58″N 49°49′38″E
- Country: Iran
- Province: Markazi
- County: Khomeyn
- Bakhsh: Kamareh
- Rural District: Chahar Cheshmeh

Population (2006)
  - Total: 167
- Time zone: UTC+3:30 (IRST)
  - Summer (DST): UTC+4:30 (IRDT)
- Website: http://Ashmesian.com

Ashmesian (Persian: اشمسيان, also Romanized as Āshmesīān and Ashmasiyan; also known as Ash Masteyān, Āsh Mestīān, Āshmīsīān, Asmesīān, and Asmesiyān) is a village in Chahar Cheshmeh Rural District, Kamareh District, Khomeyn County, Markazi Province, Iran. At the 2006 census, its population was 167, in 45 families.

== See also ==
Ashmesian (fa)

Ashmesian (instagram)
