= Qaleh-ye Mansuriyeh Jadid =

Qaleh-ye Mansuriyeh Jadid قلعه منصوريه جديد
- Village
- Country: Iran
- Province: Markazi
- County: Tafresh
- Bakhsh: Central
- Rural District: Bazarjan

Population (2006)
  - Total: 12
- Time zone: UTC+3:30 (IRST)
  - Summer (DST): UTC+4:30 (IRDT)

Qaleh-ye Mansuriyeh Jadid (Persian: قلعه منصوريه جديد, also Romanized as Qal‘eh-ye Manṣūrīyeh Jadīd) is a village in Bazarjan Rural District, in the Central District of Tafresh County, Markazi Province, Iran. At the 2006 census, its population was 12, in 4 families.
