= Feyzianeh-e Sofla =

Feyzianeh-e Sofla فيزيانه سفلي
- Village
- Location within Iran
- Coordinates: 33°40′22″N 49°15′16″E
- Country: Iran
- Province: Markazi
- County: Shazand
- Bakhsh: Sarband
- Rural District: Hendudar

Population (2006)
  - Total: 254
- Time zone: UTC+3:30 (IRST)
  - Summer (DST): UTC+4:30 (IRDT)

Feyzianeh-e Sofla (Persian: فيزيانه سفلي, also Romanized as Feyzīāneh-e Soflá; also known as Feyzīāneh-e Pā’īn, Fezāneh Pā’īn, Fezāneh-ye Pā’īn, and Fezyāneh-ye Soflá) is a village in Hendudar Rural District, Sarband District, Shazand County, Markazi Province, Iran. At the 2006 census, its population was 254, in 60 families.
