= Zangarak =

Zangarak زنگارك
- Village
- Location within Iran
- Coordinates: 34°36′46″N 49°28′32″E
- Country: Iran
- Province: Markazi
- County: Farahan
- Bakhsh: Central
- Rural District: Farmahin

Population (2006)
  - Total: 367
- Time zone: UTC+3:30 (IRST)
  - Summer (DST): UTC+4:30 (IRDT)

Zangarak (Persian: زنگارك, also Romanized as Zangārak; also known as Zainkarak) is a village in Farmahin Rural District, in the Central District of Farahan County, Markazi Province, Iran. At the 2006 census, its population was 367, in 106 families.
