= Cham-e Rahim =

Cham-e Rahim چم رحيم
- Village
- Location within Iran
- Coordinates: 33°42′12″N 49°15′41″E
- Country: Iran
- Province: Markazi
- County: Shazand
- Bakhsh: Sarband
- Rural District: Hendudar

Population (2006)
  - Total: 65
- Time zone: UTC+3:30 (IRST)
  - Summer (DST): UTC+4:30 (IRDT)

Cham-e Rahim (Persian: چم رحيم, also Romanized as Cham-e Raḩīm) is a village in Hendudar Rural District, Sarband District, Shazand County, Markazi Province, Iran. At the 2006 census, its population was 65, in 15 families.
