= Qaleh-ye Qods =

Qaleh-ye Qods قلعه قدس
- Village
- Location within Iran
- Coordinates: 34°43′11″N 49°58′37″E
- Country: Iran
- Province: Markazi
- County: Tafresh
- Bakhsh: Central
- Rural District: Bazarjan

Population (2006)
  - Total: 45
- Time zone: UTC+3:30 (IRST)
  - Summer (DST): UTC+4:30 (IRDT)

Qaleh-ye Qods (Persian: قلعه قدس, also Romanized as Qal‘eh-ye Qods; also known as Qal‘eh-ye Moḩī od Dīn and Qods) is a village in Bazarjan Rural District, in the Central District of Tafresh County, Markazi Province, Iran. At the 2006 census, its population was 45, in 20 families.
