= Qaleh-ye Afshar =

Qaleh-ye Afshar قلعه افشار
- Village
- Interactive map of Qaleh-ye Afshar
- Coordinates: 36°41′N 46°34′E
- Country: Iran
- Province: Markazi
- County: Khomeyn
- Bakhsh: Central
- Rural District: Salehan

Population (2006)
  - Total: 123
- Time zone: UTC+3:30 (IRST)
  - Summer (DST): UTC+4:30 (IRDT)

Qaleh-ye Afshar (Persian: قلعه افشار, also Romanized as Qal‘eh-ye Āfshār) is a village in Salehan Rural District, in the Central District of Khomeyn County, Markazi Province, Iran. At the 2006 census, its population was 123, in 32 families.
