= Atolen =

Atolen اتلن
- Village
- Location within Iran
- Coordinates: 35°16′32″N 49°45′25″E
- Country: Iran
- Province: Markazi
- County: Saveh
- Bakhsh: Nowbaran
- Rural District: Aq Kahriz

Population (2006)
  - Total: 15
- Time zone: UTC+3:30 (IRST)
  - Summer (DST): UTC+4:30 (IRDT)

Atolen (Persian: اتلن, also Romanized as Ātolen; also known as Ātūlen and Ātūlīn) is a village in Aq Kahriz Rural District, Nowbaran District, Saveh County, Markazi Province, Iran. At the 2006 census, its population was 15, in 6 families.
