= Molla Baqer-e Olya =

Molla Baqer-e Olya ملاباقرعليا
- Village
- Location within Iran
- Coordinates: 33°49′44″N 49°08′43″E
- Country: Iran
- Province: Markazi
- County: Shazand
- Bakhsh: Sarband
- Rural District: Hendudar

Population (2006)
  - Total: 134
- Time zone: UTC+3:30 (IRST)
  - Summer (DST): UTC+4:30 (IRDT)

Molla Baqer-e Olya (Persian: ملاباقرعليا, also Romanized as Mollā Bāqer-e ‘Olyā; also known as Mollā Bāqer) is a village in Hendudar Rural District, Sarband District, Shazand County, Markazi Province, Iran. At the 2006 census, its population was 134, in 44 families.
