= Sir Dar =

Sir Dar سيردر
- Village
- Location within Iran
- Coordinates: 34°19′21″N 49°10′36″E
- Country: Iran
- Province: Markazi
- County: Khondab
- Bakhsh: Central
- Rural District: Khondab

Population (2006)
  - Total: 158
- Time zone: UTC+3:30 (IRST)
  - Summer (DST): UTC+4:30 (IRDT)

Sir Dar (Persian: سيردر, also Romanized as Sīr Dar) is a village in Khondab Rural District, in the Central District of Khondab County, Markazi Province, Iran. At the 2006 census, its population was 158, in 33 families.
