= Qeyapa =

Qeyapa قياپا
- Village
- Location within Iran
- Coordinates: 33°34′43″N 50°04′06″E
- Country: Iran
- Province: Markazi
- County: Khomeyn
- Bakhsh: Central
- Rural District: Rostaq

Population (2006)
  - Total: 53
- Time zone: UTC+3:30 (IRST)
  - Summer (DST): UTC+4:30 (IRDT)

Qeyapa (Persian: قياپا, also Romanized as Qeyāpā, Qīāpā, and Qīyāpā; also known as Ghīyapa) is a village in Rostaq Rural District, in the Central District of Khomeyn County, Markazi Province, Iran. At the 2006 census, its population was 53, in 16 families.
