= Zaghar =

Zaghar زاغر
- Village
- Location within Iran
- Coordinates: 34°41′08″N 49°57′11″E
- Country: Iran
- Province: Markazi
- County: Tafresh
- Bakhsh: Central
- Rural District: Bazarjan

Population (2006)
  - Total: 45
- Time zone: UTC+3:30 (IRST)
  - Summer (DST): UTC+4:30 (IRDT)

Zaghar (Persian: زاغر, also Romanized as Zāghar) is a village in Bazarjan Rural District, in the Central District of Tafresh County, Markazi Province, Iran. At the 2006 census, its population was 45, in 23 families.
