= Qarah Dash, Markazi =

Qarah Dash قره داش
- Village
- Location within Iran
- Coordinates: 33°48′09″N 49°05′02″E
- Country: Iran
- Province: Markazi
- County: Shazand
- Bakhsh: Sarband
- Rural District: Malmir

Population (2006)
  - Total: 33
- Time zone: UTC+3:30 (IRST)
  - Summer (DST): UTC+4:30 (IRDT)

Qarah Dash (Persian: قره داش, also Romanized as Qarah Dāsh and Qareh Dāsh; also known as Deh-e Qareh Dāsh and Deh Qara Dāsh) is a village in Malmir Rural District, Sarband District, Shazand County, Markazi Province, Iran. At the 2006 census, its population was 33, in 10 families.
