= Emamzadeh Yujan =

Emamzadeh Yujan امامزاده يوجان
- Village
- Location within Iran
- Coordinates: 33°43′03″N 50°09′55″E
- Country: Iran
- Province: Markazi
- County: Khomeyn
- Bakhsh: Central
- Rural District: Salehan

Population (2006)
  - Total: 276
- Time zone: UTC+3:30 (IRST)
  - Summer (DST): UTC+4:30 (IRDT)

Emamzadeh Yujan (Persian: امامزاده يوجان, also Romanized as Emāmzādeh Yūjān) is a village in Salehan Rural District, in the Central District of Khomeyn County, Markazi Province, Iran. At the 2006 census, its population was 276, in 91 families.
