= Qalandariyeh =

Qalandariyeh قلندريه
- Village
- Location within Iran
- Coordinates: 34°51′58″N 50°32′25″E
- Country: Iran
- Province: Markazi
- County: Saveh
- Bakhsh: Central
- Rural District: Qareh Chay

Population (2006)
  - Total: 36
- Time zone: UTC+3:30 (IRST)
  - Summer (DST): UTC+4:30 (IRDT)

Qalandariyeh (Persian: قلندريه, also Romanized as Qalandarīyeh) is a village in Qareh Chay Rural District, in the Central District of Saveh County, Markazi Province, Iran. At the 2006 census, its population was 36, in 6 families.
