= Band-e Naqin =

Band-e Naqin بندنقين
- Village
- Location within Iran
- Coordinates: 35°01′37″N 50°01′46″E
- Country: Iran
- Province: Markazi
- County: Saveh
- Bakhsh: Central
- Rural District: Shahsavan Kandi

Population (2006)
  - Total: 62
- Time zone: UTC+3:30 (IRST)
  - Summer (DST): UTC+4:30 (IRDT)

Band-e Naqin (Persian: بندنقين, also Romanized as Band-e Naqīn; also known as Band-e Naqī and Vand Naqī) is a village in Shahsavan Kandi Rural District, in the Central District of Saveh County, Markazi Province, Iran. At the 2006 census, its population was 62, in 21 families.
