= Qusheh Khani =

Qusheh Khani قوشه خاني
- Village
- Location within Iran
- Coordinates: 34°54′07″N 49°32′50″E
- Country: Iran
- Province: Markazi
- County: Tafresh
- Bakhsh: Central
- Rural District: Rudbar

Population (2006)
  - Total: 190
- Time zone: UTC+3:30 (IRST)
  - Summer (DST): UTC+4:30 (IRDT)

Qusheh Khani (Persian: قوشه خاني, also Romanized as Qūsheh Khānī; also known as Gūsheh Khānī and Qūsheh Khāneh) is a village in Rudbar Rural District, in the Central District of Tafresh County, Markazi Province, Iran. At the 2006 census, its population was 190, in 40 families.
