= Ara Qaleh =

Ara Qaleh اراقلعه
- Village
- Location within Iran
- Coordinates: 35°06′05″N 49°43′20″E
- Country: Iran
- Province: Markazi
- County: Saveh
- Bakhsh: Nowbaran
- Rural District: Bayat

Population (2006)
  - Total: 118
- Time zone: UTC+3:30 (IRST)
  - Summer (DST): UTC+4:30 (IRDT)

Ara Qaleh village

Ara Qaleh (Persian: اراقلعه, also Romanized as Ārā Qal‘eh) is a village in Bayat Rural District, Nowbaran District, Saveh County, Markazi Province, Iran. At the 2006 census, its population was 118, in 36 families.
