= Katiran-e Pain =

Katiran-e Pain كتيران پائين
- Village
- Location within Iran
- Coordinates: 33°56′23″N 49°13′21″E
- Country: Iran
- Province: Markazi
- County: Shazand
- Bakhsh: Zalian
- Rural District: Nahr-e Mian

Population (2006)
  - Total: 186
- Time zone: UTC+3:30 (IRST)
  - Summer (DST): UTC+4:30 (IRDT)

Katiran-e Pain (Persian: كتيران پائين, also Romanized as Katīrān-e Pā’īn; also known as Katīrān-e Soflá, Ketīrā, Khatīrān, and Khetirān) is a village in Nahr-e Mian Rural District, Zalian District, Shazand County, Markazi Province, Iran. At the 2006 census, its population was 186, in 52 families.
