= Seydabad, Markazi =

Seydabad صيداباد
- Village
- Location within Iran
- Coordinates: 34°52′11″N 50°28′33″E
- Country: Iran
- Province: Markazi
- County: Saveh
- Bakhsh: Central
- Rural District: Qareh Chay

Population (2006)
  - Total: 64
- Time zone: UTC+3:30 (IRST)
  - Summer (DST): UTC+4:30 (IRDT)

Seydabad (Persian: صيداباد, also Romanized as Şeydābād; also known as Şeydābād-e Rūdkhāneh) is a village in Qareh Chay Rural District, in the Central District of Saveh County, Markazi Province, Iran. At the 2006 census, its population was 64, in 11 families.
