= Siah Soltan =

Siah Soltan سياه سلطان
- Village
- Location within Iran
- Coordinates: 33°44′28″N 49°20′36″E
- Country: Iran
- Province: Markazi
- County: Shazand
- Bakhsh: Sarband
- Rural District: Hendudar

Population (2006)
  - Total: 101
- Time zone: UTC+3:30 (IRST)
  - Summer (DST): UTC+4:30 (IRDT)

Siah Soltan (Persian: سياه سلطان, also Romanized as Sīāh Solţān and Seyāh Solţān; also known as Mīā Solţān, Mia Sultān, and Sīā Solţān) is a village in Hendudar Rural District, Sarband District, Shazand County, Markazi Province, Iran. At the 2006 census, its population was 101, in 19 families.
