= Deh-e Mir Qasem =

Deh-e Mir Qasem ده ميرقاسم
- Village
- Location within Iran
- Coordinates: 33°40′56″N 49°16′16″E
- Country: Iran
- Province: Markazi
- County: Shazand
- Bakhsh: Sarband
- Rural District: Hendudar

Population (2006)
  - Total: 81
- Time zone: UTC+3:30 (IRST)
  - Summer (DST): UTC+4:30 (IRDT)

Deh-e Mir Qasem (Persian: ده ميرقاسم, also Romanized as Deh-e Mīr Qāsem; also known as Mīr Qāsem) is a village in Hendudar Rural District, Sarband District, Shazand County, Markazi Province, Iran. At the 2006 census, its population was 81, in 19 families.
