= Sangak, Iran =

Sangak سنگك
- Village
- Location within Iran
- Coordinates: 35°15′14″N 49°43′39″E
- Country: Iran
- Province: Markazi
- County: Saveh
- Bakhsh: Nowbaran
- Rural District: Aq Kahriz

Population (2006)
  - Total: 304
- Time zone: UTC+3:30 (IRST)
  - Summer (DST): UTC+4:30 (IRDT)

Sangak (Persian: سنگك) is a village in Aq Kahriz Rural District, Nowbaran District, Saveh County, Markazi Province, Iran. At the 2006 census, its population was 304, in 113 families.
