= Sir Kand =

Sir Kand سيركند
- Village
- Location within Iran
- Coordinates: 33°56′17″N 49°37′42″E
- Country: Iran
- Province: Markazi
- County: Arak
- Bakhsh: Central
- Rural District: Shamsabad

Population (2006)
  - Total: 191
- Time zone: UTC+3:30 (IRST)
  - Summer (DST): UTC+4:30 (IRDT)

Sir Kand (Persian: سيركند, also Romanized as Sīr Kand; also known as Sherkhān, Shīr Khān, and Sīr Kan) is a village in Shamsabad Rural District, in the Central District of Arak County, Markazi Province, Iran. At the 2006 census, its population was 191, in 54 families.
