= Quch Bolaghi =

Quch Bolaghi قوچ بلاغي
- Village
- Location within Iran
- Coordinates: 35°06′36″N 49°28′03″E
- Country: Iran
- Province: Markazi
- County: Saveh
- Bakhsh: Nowbaran
- Rural District: Bayat

Population (2006)
  - Total: 15
- Time zone: UTC+3:30 (IRST)
  - Summer (DST): UTC+4:30 (IRDT)

Quch Bolaghi (Persian: قوچ بلاغي, also Romanized as Qūch Bolāghī; also known as Aqkūl, Ghooch Bolaghi, and Quchhbulāq) is a village in Bayat Rural District, Nowbaran District, Saveh County, Markazi Province, Iran. At the 2006 census, its population was 15, in 5 families.
