= Changezin =

Changezin چنگزين
- Village
- Location within Iran
- Coordinates: 33°53′33″N 49°45′36″E
- Country: Iran
- Province: Markazi
- County: Arak
- Bakhsh: Central
- Rural District: Shamsabad

Population (2006)
  - Total: 89
- Time zone: UTC+3:30 (IRST)
  - Summer (DST): UTC+4:30 (IRDT)

Changezin (Persian: چنگزين, also Romanized as Changezīn and Chāngazīn) is a village in Shamsabad Rural District, in the Central District of Arak County, Markazi Province, Iran. At the 2006 census, its population was 89, in 22 families.
