= Malham Dar =

Malham Dar ملحمدر
- Village
- Location within Iran
- Coordinates: 33°37′43″N 49°14′21″E
- Country: Iran
- Province: Markazi
- County: Shazand
- Bakhsh: Sarband
- Rural District: Hendudar

Population (2006)
  - Total: 79
- Time zone: UTC+3:30 (IRST)
  - Summer (DST): UTC+4:30 (IRDT)

Malham Dar (Persian: ملحمدر, also Romanized as Malḩam Dar) is a village in Hendudar Rural District, Sarband District, Shazand County, Markazi Province, Iran. At the 2006 census, its population was 79, in 17 families.
