= Estijak =

Estijak استيجك
- Village
- Location within Iran
- Coordinates: 35°04′12″N 49°46′09″E
- Country: Iran
- Province: Markazi
- County: Saveh
- Bakhsh: Nowbaran
- Rural District: Bayat

Population (2006)
  - Total: 61
- Time zone: UTC+3:30 (IRST)
  - Summer (DST): UTC+4:30 (IRDT)

Estijak (Persian: استيجك, also Romanized as Estījak; also known as Ashtajak and Īstījak) is a village in Bayat Rural District, Nowbaran District, Saveh County, Markazi Province, Iran. At the 2006 census, its population was 61, in 31 families.
