= Ashoqeh =

Ashoqeh عاشقه
- Village
- Location within Iran
- Coordinates: 33°40′46″N 50°03′27″E
- Country: Iran
- Province: Markazi
- County: Khomeyn
- Bakhsh: Central
- Rural District: Hamzehlu

Population (2006)
  - Total: 69
- Time zone: UTC+3:30 (IRST)
  - Summer (DST): UTC+4:30 (IRDT)

Ashoqeh (Persian: عاشقه, also Romanized as ‘Āshoqeh, ‘Āsheqeh, and Ashqeh; also known as Ashegheh) is a village in Hamzehlu Rural District, in the Central District of Khomeyn County, Markazi Province, Iran. At the 2006 census, its population was 69, in 19 families.
