= Afshjerd =

Afshjerd افشجرد
- Village
- Location within Iran
- Coordinates: 33°57′36″N 50°36′51″E
- Country: Iran
- Province: Markazi
- County: Mahallat
- Bakhsh: Central
- Rural District: Baqerabad

Population (2006)
  - Total: 21
- Time zone: UTC+3:30 (IRST)
  - Summer (DST): UTC+4:30 (IRDT)

Afshjerd (Persian: افشجرد; also known as Āb Shegerd and Afshījerd) is a village in Baqerabad Rural District, in the Central District of Mahallat County, Markazi Province, Iran. At the 2006 census, its population was 21, in 12 families.
