= Qeshlaq-e Sialeh =

Qeshlaq-e Sialeh قشلاق سياله
- Village
- Location within Iran
- Coordinates: 34°56′02″N 50°02′23″E
- Country: Iran
- Province: Markazi
- County: Saveh
- Bakhsh: Central
- Rural District: Nur Ali Beyk

Population (2006)
  - Total: 32
- Time zone: UTC+3:30 (IRST)
  - Summer (DST): UTC+4:30 (IRDT)

Qeshlaq-e Sialeh (Persian: قشلاق سياله, also Romanized as Qeshlāq-e Sīāleh; also known as Sīāleh) is a village in Nur Ali Beyk Rural District, in the Central District of Saveh County, Markazi Province, Iran. At the 2006 census, its population was 32, in 9 families.
