= Qeshlaq-e Ziba =

Qeshlaq-e Ziba قشلاق زيبا
- Village
- Location within Iran
- Coordinates: 34°20′33″N 49°18′25″E
- Country: Iran
- Province: Markazi
- County: Khondab
- Bakhsh: Qareh Chay
- Rural District: Javersiyan

Population (2006)
  - Total: 41
- Time zone: UTC+3:30 (IRST)
  - Summer (DST): UTC+4:30 (IRDT)

Qeshlaq-e Ziba (Persian: قشلاق زيبا, also Romanized as Qeshlāq-e Zībā) is a village in Javersiyan Rural District, Qareh Chay District, Khondab County, Markazi Province, Iran. At the 2006 census, its population was 41, in 7 families.
