= Khalifeh Bolaghi =

Khalifeh Bolaghi خليفه بلاغي
- Village
- Location within Iran
- Coordinates: 33°42′13″N 49°16′27″E
- Country: Iran
- Province: Markazi
- County: Shazand
- Bakhsh: Sarband
- Rural District: Hendudar

Population (2006)
  - Total: 281
- Time zone: UTC+3:30 (IRST)
  - Summer (DST): UTC+4:30 (IRDT)

Khalifeh Bolaghi (Persian: خليفه بلاغي, also Romanized as Khalīfeh Bolāghī; also known as Khalīt Bolāgh) is a village in Hendudar Rural District, Sarband District, Shazand County, Markazi Province, Iran. At the 2006 census, its population was 281, in 59 families.
