= Jubadeh =

Jubadeh جوباده
- Village
- Location within Iran
- Coordinates: 33°50′56″N 50°04′30″E
- Country: Iran
- Province: Markazi
- County: Khomeyn
- Bakhsh: Central
- Rural District: Hamzehlu

Population (2006)
  - Total: 30
- Time zone: UTC+3:30 (IRST)
  - Summer (DST): UTC+4:30 (IRDT)

Jubadeh (Persian: جوباده, also Romanized as Jūbādeh; also known as Jabadeh, Jabbādeh, and Jonnādeh) is a village in Hamzehlu Rural District, in the Central District of Khomeyn County, Markazi Province, Iran. At the 2006 census, its population was 30, in 11 families.
