= Qarineh Darreh =

Qarineh Darreh قرينه دره
- Village
- Location within Iran
- Coordinates: 33°50′37″N 49°11′27″E
- Country: Iran
- Province: Markazi
- County: Shazand
- Bakhsh: Sarband
- Rural District: Hendudar

Population (2006)
  - Total: 128
- Time zone: UTC+3:30 (IRST)
  - Summer (DST): UTC+4:30 (IRDT)

Qarineh Darreh (Persian: قرينه دره, also Romanized as Qarīneh Darreh; also known as Qarīneh Darreh-ye ‘Olyā) is a village in Hendudar Rural District, Sarband District, Shazand County, Markazi Province, Iran. At the 2006 census, its population was 128, in 30 families.
