= Machinak =

Machinak مچينك
- Village
- Location within Iran
- Coordinates: 35°10′04″N 49°30′17″E
- Country: Iran
- Province: Markazi
- County: Saveh
- Bakhsh: Nowbaran
- Rural District: Bayat

Population (2006)
  - Total: 121
- Time zone: UTC+3:30 (IRST)
  - Summer (DST): UTC+4:30 (IRDT)

Machinak (Persian: مچينك, also Romanized as Machīnak; also known as Mīchīnak and Mīchītak) is a village in Bayat Rural District, Nowbaran District, Saveh County, Markazi Province, Iran. At the 2006 census, its population was 121, made up of 38 families.
