= Fasharud =

Fasharud فشارود
- Village
- Location within Iran
- Coordinates: 33°40′55″N 50°17′25″E
- Country: Iran
- Province: Markazi
- County: Khomeyn
- Bakhsh: Central
- Rural District: Galehzan

Population (2006)
  - Total: 121
- Time zone: UTC+3:30 (IRST)
  - Summer (DST): UTC+4:30 (IRDT)

Fasharud (Persian: فشارود, also Romanized as Fashārūd; also known as Feshār Rūd) is a village in Galehzan Rural District, in the Central District of Khomeyn County, Markazi Province, Iran. At the 2006 census, its population was 121, in 42 families.
