= Araqiyeh =

Araqiyeh عراقيه
- Village
- Location within Iran
- Coordinates: 34°32′25″N 49°37′12″E
- Country: Iran
- Province: Markazi
- County: Farahan
- Bakhsh: Central
- Rural District: Farmahin

Population (2006)
  - Total: 30
- Time zone: UTC+3:30 (IRST)
  - Summer (DST): UTC+4:30 (IRDT)

Araqiyeh (Persian: عراقيه, also Romanized as ‘Arāqīyeh) is a village in Farmahin Rural District, in the Central District of Farahan County, Markazi Province, Iran. At the 2006 census, its population was 30, in 12 families.
