= Chaqa Siah =

Chaqa Siah چقاسياه
- Village
- Location within Iran
- Coordinates: 33°57′18″N 49°12′37″E
- Country: Iran
- Province: Markazi
- County: Shazand
- Bakhsh: Zalian
- Rural District: Nahr-e Mian

Population (2006)
  - Total: 343
- Time zone: UTC+3:30 (IRST)
  - Summer (DST): UTC+4:30 (IRDT)

Chaqa Siah (Persian: چقاسياه, also Romanized as Chaqā Sīāh, Chaqā Seyāh, and Cheqā Sīāh; also known as Chigha-yi-Siah and Chvoqā Sīāh) is a village in Nahr-e Mian Rural District, Zalian District, Shazand County, Markazi Province, Iran. At the 2006 census, its population was 343, in 100 families.
