= Qeshlaq-e Chalablu =

Qeshlaq-e Chalablu قشلاق چلبلو
- Village
- Location within Iran
- Coordinates: 34°58′46″N 50°18′03″E
- Country: Iran
- Province: Markazi
- County: Saveh
- Bakhsh: Central
- Rural District: Nur Ali Beyk

Population (2006)
  - Total: 396
- Time zone: UTC+3:30 (IRST)
  - Summer (DST): UTC+4:30 (IRDT)

Qeshlaq-e Chalablu (Persian: قشلاق چلبلو, also Romanized as Qeshlāq-e Chalablū and Qeshlāq Chalablū; also known as Chalablū) is a village in Nur Ali Beyk Rural District, in the Central District of Saveh County, Markazi Province, Iran. At the 2006 census, its population was 396, in 89 families.
