= Qezel Qaleh, Markazi =

Qezel Qaleh قزل قلعه
- Village
- Location within Iran
- Coordinates: 34°19′21″N 49°06′54″E
- Country: Iran
- Province: Markazi
- County: Khondab
- Bakhsh: Central
- Rural District: Khondab

Population (2006)
  - Total: 127
- Time zone: UTC+3:30 (IRST)
  - Summer (DST): UTC+4:30 (IRDT)

Qezel Qaleh (Persian: قزل قلعه, also Romanized as Qezel Qal‘eh; also known as Qezei Qal‘eh) is a village in Khondab Rural District, in the Central District of Khondab County, Markazi Province, Iran. At the 2006 census, its population was 127, in 25 families.
