= Saqar Juqak =

Saqar Juqak سقرجوقك
- Village
- Location within Iran
- Coordinates: 34°34′52″N 49°26′19″E
- Country: Iran
- Province: Markazi
- County: Farahan
- Bakhsh: Central
- Rural District: Farmahin

Population (2006)
  - Total: 91
- Time zone: UTC+3:30 (IRST)
  - Summer (DST): UTC+4:30 (IRDT)

Saqar Juqak (Persian: سقرجوقك, also Romanized as Saqar Jūqak and Seqer Jūqak; also known as Saghar Joogh and Seqer Jūq) is a village in Farmahin Rural District, in the Central District of Farahan County, Markazi Province, Iran. At the 2006 census, its population was 91, in 25 families.
