= Vezvanaq =

Vezvanaq وزوانق
- Village
- Location within Iran
- Coordinates: 34°32′01″N 49°05′14″E
- Country: Iran
- Province: Markazi
- County: Khondab
- Bakhsh: Central
- Rural District: Deh Chal

Population (2006)
  - Total: 150
- Time zone: UTC+3:30 (IRST)
  - Summer (DST): UTC+4:30 (IRDT)

Vezvanaq (Persian: وزوانق, also Romanized as Vezvānaq and Vazvānaq; also known as Vazvangh) is a village in Deh Chal Rural District, in the Central District of Khondab County, Markazi Province, Iran. At the 2006 census, its population was 150, in 32 families.
