= Varak Bar-e Sofla =

Varak Bar-e Sofla وركبارسفلي
- Village
- Location within Iran
- Coordinates: 35°02′33″N 49°59′07″E
- Country: Iran
- Province: Markazi
- County: Saveh
- Bakhsh: Central
- Rural District: Shahsavan Kandi

Population (2006)
  - Total: 8
- Time zone: UTC+3:30 (IRST)
  - Summer (DST): UTC+4:30 (IRDT)

Varak Bar-e Sofla (Persian: وركبارسفلي, also Romanized as Varak Bār-e Soflá; also known as Varak Bār, Varakbār, and Varak Bār-e Pā’īn) is a village in Shahsavan Kandi Rural District, in the Central District of Saveh County, Markazi Province, Iran. At the 2006 census, its population was 8, in 7 families.
