= Sanjeh Bashi =

Sanjeh Bashi سنجه باشي
- Village
- Location within Iran
- Coordinates: 33°51′10″N 50°21′34″E
- Country: Iran
- Province: Markazi
- County: Mahallat
- Bakhsh: Central
- Rural District: Baqerabad

Population (2006)
  - Total: 17
- Time zone: UTC+3:30 (IRST)
  - Summer (DST): UTC+4:30 (IRDT)

Sanjeh Bashi (Persian: سنجه باشي, also Romanized as Sanjeh Bāshī; also known as Sanjbāshi, Sanjeh Bāshe, and Sanjeh Vāsheh) is a village in Baqerabad Rural District, in the Central District of Mahallat County, Markazi Province, Iran. At the 2006 census, its population was 17, in 5 families.
