= Deh-e Zu ol Faqar =

Deh-e Zu ol Faqar ده ذوالفقار
- Village
- Location within Iran
- Coordinates: 33°50′31″N 49°07′40″E
- Country: Iran
- Province: Markazi
- County: Shazand
- Bakhsh: Zalian
- Rural District: Zalian

Population (2006)
  - Total: 76
- Time zone: UTC+3:30 (IRST)
  - Summer (DST): UTC+4:30 (IRDT)

Deh-e Zu ol Faqar (Persian: ده ذوالفقار, also Romanized as Deh-e Z̄ū ol Faqār, Deh-e Z̄owlfaqār, Deh Z̄owifaqār, Deh Z̄owlfaqār, and Deh Zulfiqār) is a village in Zalian Rural District, Zalian District, Shazand County, Markazi Province, Iran. At the 2006 census, its population was 76, in 19 families.
