= Arjrud =

Arjrud ارجرود
- Village
- Location within Iran
- Coordinates: 35°03′49″N 49°54′12″E
- Country: Iran
- Province: Markazi
- County: Saveh
- Bakhsh: Central
- Rural District: Shahsavan Kandi

Population (2006)
  - Total: 40
- Time zone: UTC+3:30 (IRST)
  - Summer (DST): UTC+4:30 (IRDT)

Arjrud (Persian: ارجرود, also Romanized as Arjrūd and Arjarūd) is a village in Shahsavan Kandi Rural District, in the Central District of Saveh County, Markazi Province, Iran. At the 2006 census, its population was 40, in 15 families.
