= Tarkhuran =

Tarkhuran طرخوران
- Village
- Location within Iran
- Coordinates: 34°56′17″N 50°22′57″E
- Country: Iran
- Province: Markazi
- County: Saveh
- Bakhsh: Central
- Rural District: Qareh Chay

Population (2006)
  - Total: 83
- Time zone: UTC+3:30 (IRST)
  - Summer (DST): UTC+4:30 (IRDT)

Tarkhuran (Persian: طرخوران, also Romanized as Ţarkhūrān; also known as Tarkhārān) is a village in Qareh Chay Rural District, in the Central District of Saveh County, Markazi Province, Iran. At the 2006 census, its population was 83, in 17 families. It is located in an upland valley at an elevation of 970 m. Water for irrigation comes from mountain springs and is delivered by a qanat system.
