= Sari Qash =

Sari Qash ساريقاش
- Village
- Location within Iran
- Coordinates: 35°10′16″N 49°59′29″E
- Country: Iran
- Province: Markazi
- County: Saveh
- Bakhsh: Nowbaran
- Rural District: Aq Kahriz

Population (2006)
  - Total: 37
- Time zone: UTC+3:30 (IRST)
  - Summer (DST): UTC+4:30 (IRDT)

Sari Qash (Persian: ساريقاش, also Romanized as Sārī Qāsh) is a village in Aq Kahriz Rural District, Nowbaran District, Saveh County, Markazi Province, Iran. At the 2006 census, its population was 37, in 11 families.
