= Qaleh-ye Yujan =

Qaleh-ye Yujan قلعه يوجان
- Village
- Location within Iran
- Coordinates: 33°43′01″N 50°09′40″E
- Country: Iran
- Province: Markazi
- County: Khomeyn
- Bakhsh: Central
- Rural District: Salehan

Population (2006)
  - Total: 153
- Time zone: UTC+3:30 (IRST)
  - Summer (DST): UTC+4:30 (IRDT)

Qaleh-ye Yujan (Persian: قلعه يوجان, also Romanized as Qal‘eh-ye Yūjān; also known as Yūjān) is a village in Salehan Rural District, in the Central District of Khomeyn County, Markazi Province, Iran. At the 2006 census, its population was 153, in 48 families.
