= Zorjin =

Zorjin زرجين
- Village
- Location within Iran
- Coordinates: 34°55′46″N 49°52′39″E
- Country: Iran
- Province: Markazi
- County: Tafresh
- Bakhsh: Central
- Rural District: Bazarjan

Population (2006)
  - Total: 231
- Time zone: UTC+3:30 (IRST)
  - Summer (DST): UTC+4:30 (IRDT)

Zorjin (Persian: زرجين, also Romanized as Zorjīn, Zorojīn, and Zārjīn; also known as Zarchīn, Zowrjīn, and Zūrjīn) is a village in Bazarjan Rural District, in the Central District of Tafresh County, Markazi Province, Iran. At the 2006 census, its population was 231, in 83 families.
