= Ordmin =

Ordmin اردمين
- Village
- Location within Iran
- Coordinates: 35°13′16″N 49°48′22″E
- Country: Iran
- Province: Markazi
- County: Saveh
- Bakhsh: Nowbaran
- Rural District: Aq Kahriz

Population (2006)
  - Total: 199
- Time zone: UTC+3:30 (IRST)
  - Summer (DST): UTC+4:30 (IRDT)

Ordmin (Persian: اردمين, also Romanized as Ordmīn, Ardamīn, and Ardmīn) is a village in Aq Kahriz Rural District, Nowbaran District, Saveh County, Markazi Province, Iran. At the 2006 census, its population was 199, in 84 families.
