= Hasheh =

Hasheh حشه
- Village
- Location within Iran
- Coordinates: 34°49′33″N 49°48′01″E
- Country: Iran
- Province: Markazi
- County: Tafresh
- Bakhsh: Central
- Rural District: Rudbar

Population (2006)
  - Total: 38
- Time zone: UTC+3:30 (IRST)
  - Summer (DST): UTC+4:30 (IRDT)

Hasheh (Persian: حشه, also Romanized as Ḩasheh and Hashāh) is a village in Rudbar Rural District, in the Central District of Tafresh County, Markazi Province, Iran. At the 2006 census, its population was 38, in 11 families.
