= Lowz Dar =

Lowz Dar لوزدر
- Village
- Location within Iran
- Coordinates: 33°33′42″N 49°45′36″E
- Country: Iran
- Province: Markazi
- County: Khomeyn
- Bakhsh: Kamareh
- Rural District: Chahar Cheshmeh

Population (2006)
  - Total: 10
- Time zone: UTC+3:30 (IRST)
  - Summer (DST): UTC+4:30 (IRDT)

Lowz Dar (Persian: لوزدر; also known as Līzdar and Līzz̄ar) is a village in Chahar Cheshmeh Rural District, Kamareh District, Khomeyn County, Markazi Province, Iran. At the 2006 census, its population was 10, in 4 families.
