= Shahr-e Mizan =

Shahr-e Mizan شهرميزان
- Village
- Location within Iran
- Coordinates: 33°41′15″N 50°13′41″E
- Country: Iran
- Province: Markazi
- County: Khomeyn
- Bakhsh: Central
- Rural District: Galehzan

Population (2006)
  - Total: 132
- Time zone: UTC+3:30 (IRST)
  - Summer (DST): UTC+4:30 (IRDT)

Shahr-e Mizan (Persian: شهرميزان, also Romanized as Shahr-e Mīzān) is a village in Galehzan Rural District, in the Central District of Khomeyn County, Markazi Province, Iran. At the 2006 census, its population was 132, in 43 families.
