= Qeshlaq-e Qotbabad =

Qeshlaq-e Qotbabad قشلاق قطب اباد
- Village
- Location within Iran
- Coordinates: 34°25′31″N 49°12′24″E
- Country: Iran
- Province: Markazi
- County: Khondab
- Bakhsh: Central
- Rural District: Khondab

Population (2006)
  - Total: 124
- Time zone: UTC+3:30 (IRST)
  - Summer (DST): UTC+4:30 (IRDT)

Qeshlaq-e Qotbabad (Persian: قشلاق قطب اباد, also Romanized as Qeshlāq-e Qoţbābād; also known as Qoţbābād) is a village in Khondab Rural District, in the Central District of Khondab County, Markazi Province, Iran. At the 2006 census, its population was 124, in 31 families.
