= Amanabad =

Amanabad (Persian: امان اباد) may refer to:

- Amanabad, Markazi
- Amanabad, North Khorasan
- Amanabad, Razavi Khorasan
- Amanabad, Sistan and Baluchestan
- Amanabad Rural District, in Markazi Province
