= Miqan Wetland =

Wetland in Iran

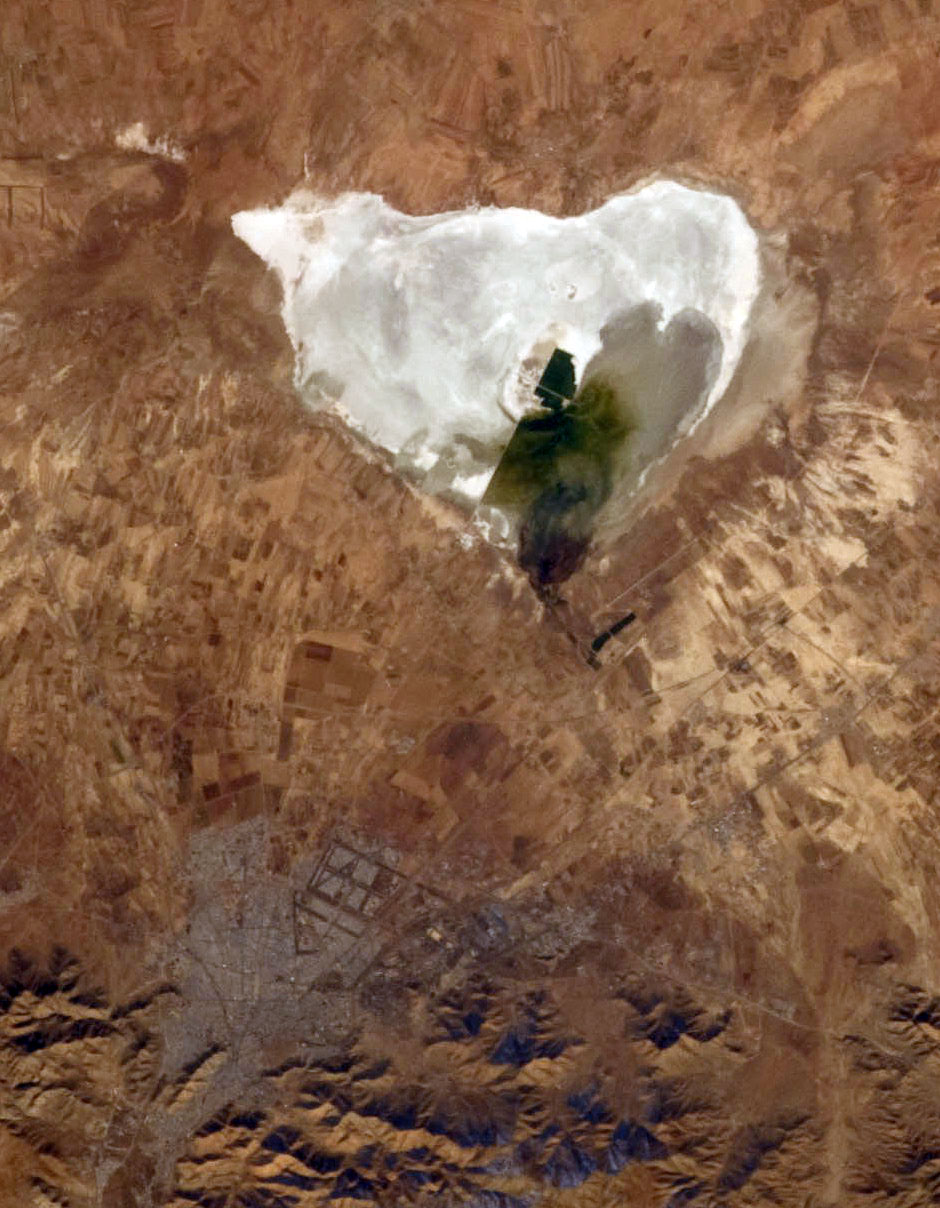

- Location of the Miqan Wetlands in Iran
- Location: Markazi province، Iran
- Coordinates: 34°12′N 49°51′E
- Type: Desert Wetland
- Primary inflows: Qara Kahriz, Farahan, Shahrab rivers
- Primary outflows: Evaporation
- Catchment area: Miqan catchment
- Basin countries: Iran
- Built: Paleocene Era
- Surface area: 25,000 hectares (97 sq mi)
- Average depth: Very shallow
- Max. depth: 1.40 metres (4.6 ft)
- Surface elevation: 1,700 metres (5,600 ft)
- Islands: 3
- Settlements: Arak, Davudabad

Miqan Wetland (Persian: تالاب میقان) is a wetland located in Markazi province, Iran. In years with good rainfall, the wetland has a significant water level and in the years with less rain, its surface generally dries and becomes a desert. The wetland's average altitude is 1,700 metres (5,600 ft) above sea level and its water levels vary in different seasons. Miqan is supplied from different water sources such as rainfall, water of three rivers known as Qarah Kahriz (Koohrood) River, Farahan River, Shahrab River, and Arak's wastewater treatment sewage. The area of the wetland is about 25,000 hectares (97 sq mi), which includes a lake with three islands and the surrounding plains. Archaeologically, the wetland's formation dates back to the Paleocene, which was due to the movement of the surrounding tectonic plates.

The Miqan Wetland has special ecological features, including the fact that it hosts a large number of migratory birds each year, among which some rare and protected species can be seen. This wetland has become one of the most important environments in the country due to the high population of Gruidaes (Grus). The vegetation of the region is more of saline plants or halophytes, which makes the wetland an important resource of halophytes in the country. In addition to birds, mammal species, artemia (brine shrimps), and saltwater algae are other living things in the wetland and its surroundings.

== Name root ==
The word Miqan literally means believing. In the past, the wetland was named as "Namakzar Farahan." This wetland is also called "Miqan Desert" due to its high evaporation of water. However, the term “desert” does not mean “desert” in Persian, it is a word used instead of “playa."

== Location ==
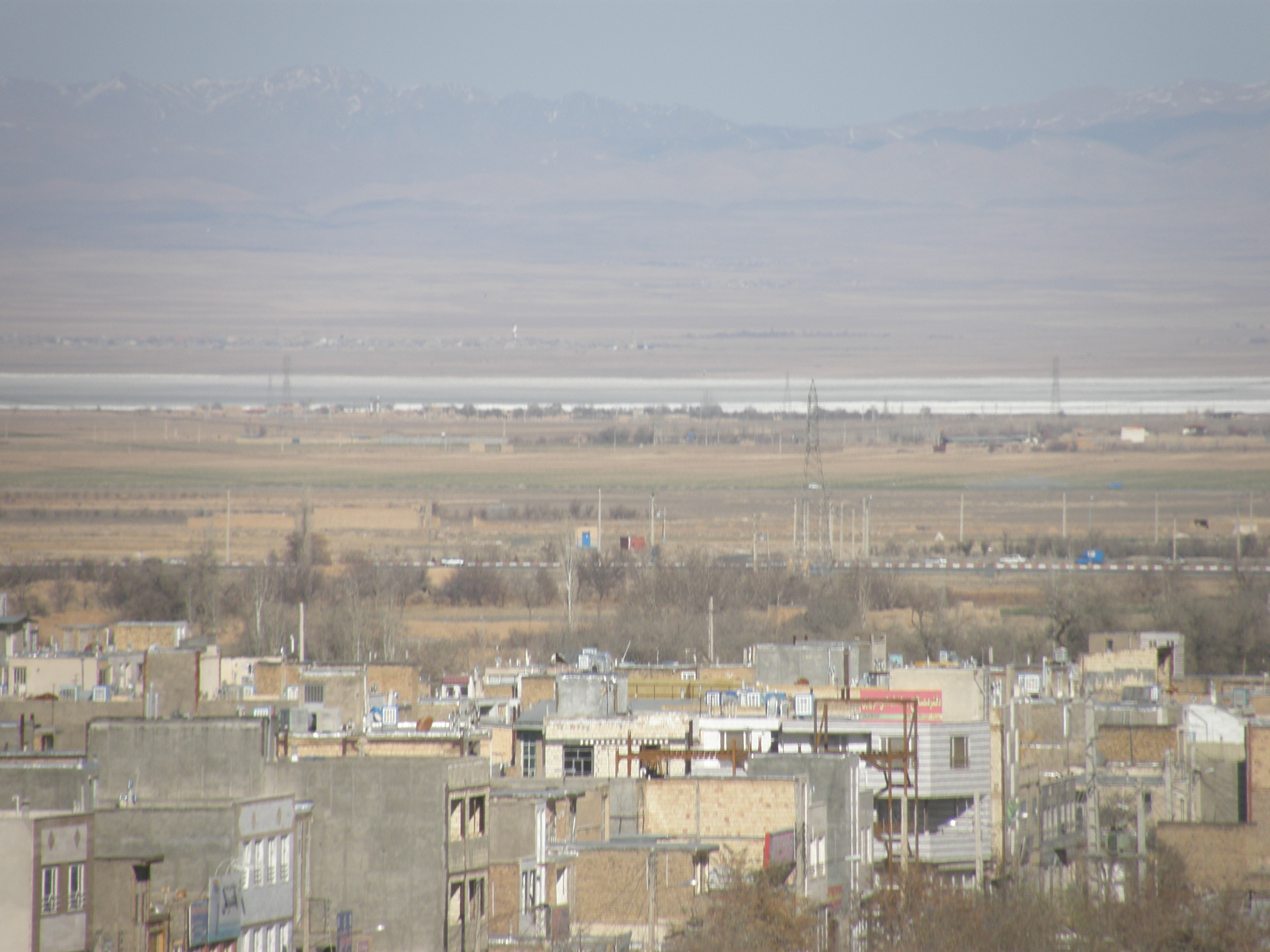
View of the wetland from the city of Arak

Miqan Wetland with an area of 25,000 hectares (97 sq mi). The area of Miqan wetland reached 61.18 square kilometres (23.62 sq mi) in May 2019 and more than 19 square kilometres (7.3 sq mi) in August 2019. It is located 15 kilometres (9.3 mi) northeast of Arak and in the south of Davudabad. It is next to Rahzan, Deh Namak, and Miqan villages. The catchment area of the wetland varies between 10,000–12,000 hectares (39–46 mi^{2}) depending on the amount of the absorbed water. Its average altitude is 1,700 metres (5,600 ft) above sea level and its annual rainfall is 258 millimetres (10.2 in). The water level of the wetland (in different seasons of the year) reaches to 140 centimetres (55 in).

Miqan Wetland consists of a seasonal lake, desert, and alluvial plains. The nearest mountain to the wetland is located 10 kilometres (6.2 mi) southeast of it, which is called "Kooh Takht Zard" with the height of 2,269 meters (7,444 ft). There are three islands in the middle of the wetland, the largest of which is 500 square metres (5,400 sq ft). Miqan Wetland is located at the flattest section of Farahan plain and the region of Arak.

== History ==
Miqan Wetland is one of the last ecological plains in Arak. All of the region's water pours into it.

In terms of tectonics, the wetland has two large mountainous sides and a sedimentary plain in the middle. The wetland looks like a valley that has sunk along two faults.

According to experts, the wetland is estimated to be 2000 years old. The history of the formation of the region dates back to the Paleocene.

== Water supply ==
Most of the water entering the wetland is due to rainfall, the surrounding springs, and the seasonal rivers of the region such as Farahan, Shahrab, and Qara Kahriz rivers. In the recent years, the entry of sewage effluent in the city of Arak at the rate of 700 litres per second (25 cu ft/s) has been another source of water supply in the wetland, which has affected the region's ecosystem. The level of groundwater aquifers of the wetland has decreased by 13 metres (43 ft), which doubles the risk of groundwater salinization and secondary environmental damage.

== Climate ==
The climate of the wetland is hot, dry, and Mediterranean. Its annual rainfall is 354 millimetres (13.9 in), and its annual evaporation is four times more than the rainfall. The wetland has a high annual temperature difference and sometimes reaches to 69 °C (156 °F). Indiscriminate human intervention in the last 27 years has caused the temperature of the wetland to rise by one degree.

Due to the location of the city near the wetland, water vapor rising from the surface of the wetland softens the air, increases steam and fog, and has a positive effect on reducing the transfer of fine dust. Therefore, in the winter all flights from the airport which is located near the city are cancelled.

== Natural features ==
Miqan Wetland is a vulnerable environment because of its size, ecological features, and the extent of its impact on the climate of the region and the city of Arak. In 2008, it became a no-hunting area due to the fragile ecosystem. However, since it has valuable and unique environmental features, Miqan Wetland has the necessary characteristics to join to the Ramsar Convention as an international wetlands as well as the protected area of migratory birds and to be registered as national natural areas.

=== Ecological features ===
This wetland has special ecological features, such as the fact that a large number of migratory birds migrate to this wetland every year during the bird migration season. Among these migratory birds, some rare and protected species such as gray terns can be seen. The gray tern is one of the special and important species under international protection, and every year with the beginning of the cold season, Miqan wetland hosts the temporary migration of this valuable migratory bird species.

=== Flora ===
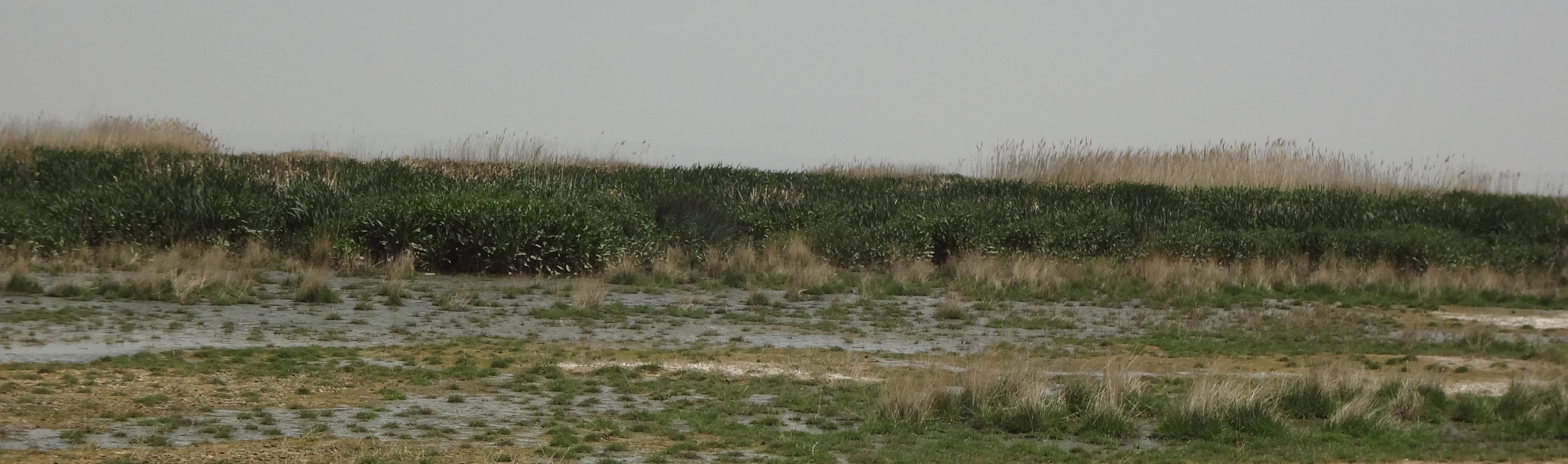
Vegetation resulting from the entry of sewage effluent

Vegetation on the edge of the lagoon is weak. Only in the northwest and middle islands where the underground water table is high, Atriplex plant species and Nitraria can be seen. Due to the evaporation and transpiration of these plants, their stability decreases in the summer season and the species go down to obtain water for their roots and cover the hill in the form of an umbrella. At the same time as these plants grow, they prevent the movement of sand particles and cause the formation of Nabkha. The height of these trees reaches 1.5 to 2.5 metres (4.9 to 8.2 ft).

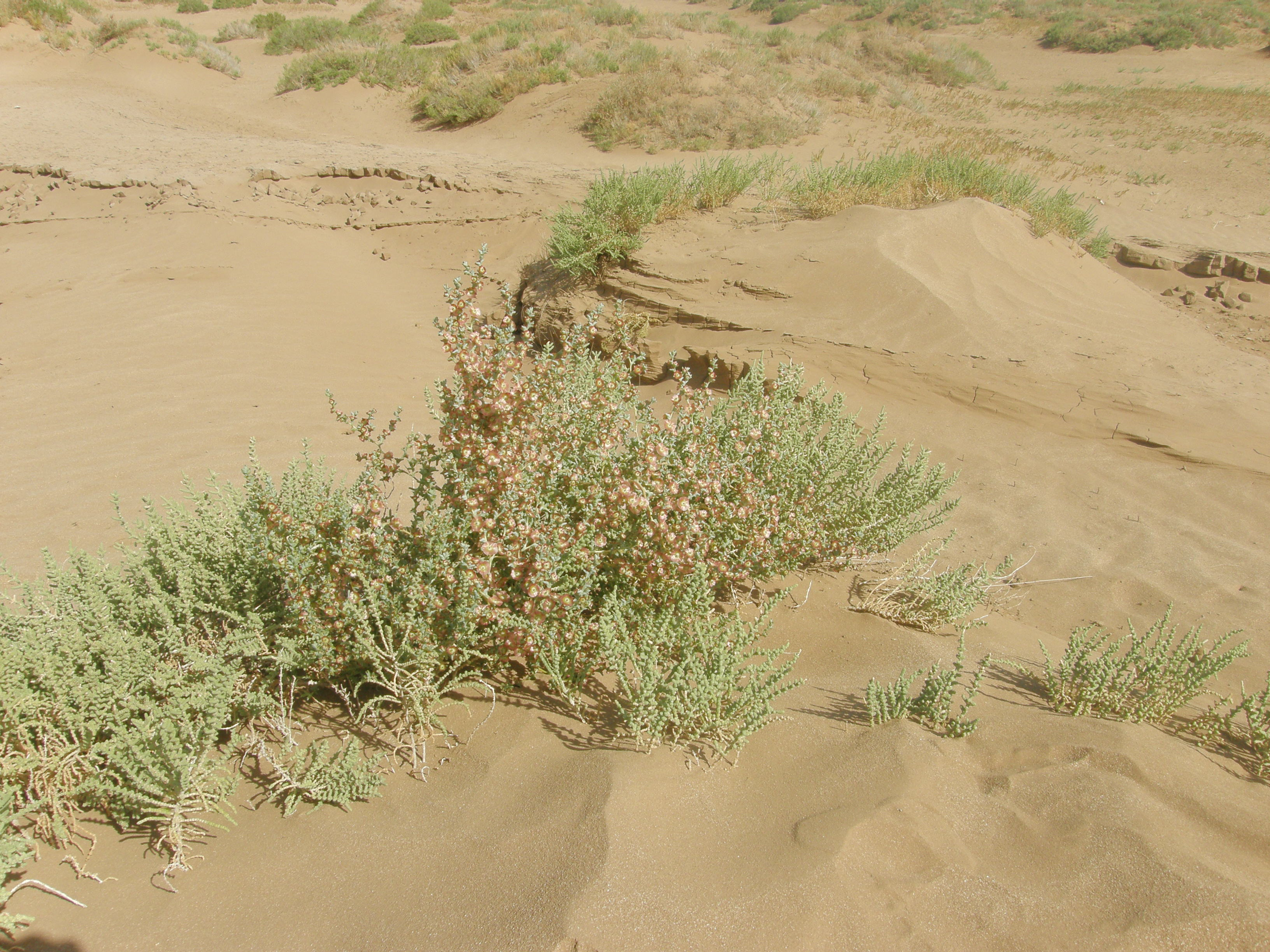
A young bush of Qara Dagh in the sand dunes

=== Fauna ===
Miqan wetland is one of the habitats of Siberian migratory birds and one of the important habitats of migratory birds in the center of the country. Every year, 25 to 30 thousand migratory birds of various species, including gray terns, travel to Miqan Wetland to spend the winter. Miqan is home to more than 60% of Central Province's birds and 16% of the country's birds, of which 27 vulnerable or rare species are protected in the region. Among the species of birds, the Eurasian teal, Northern shoveler, flamingo, gray goose, hubara, tencha, heron, and green duck are among the guests of this habitat.The Common crane is one of the special and important species under international protection, and Miqan wetland hosts the temporary migration of this valuable species of migratory birds every year at the beginning of the cold season.

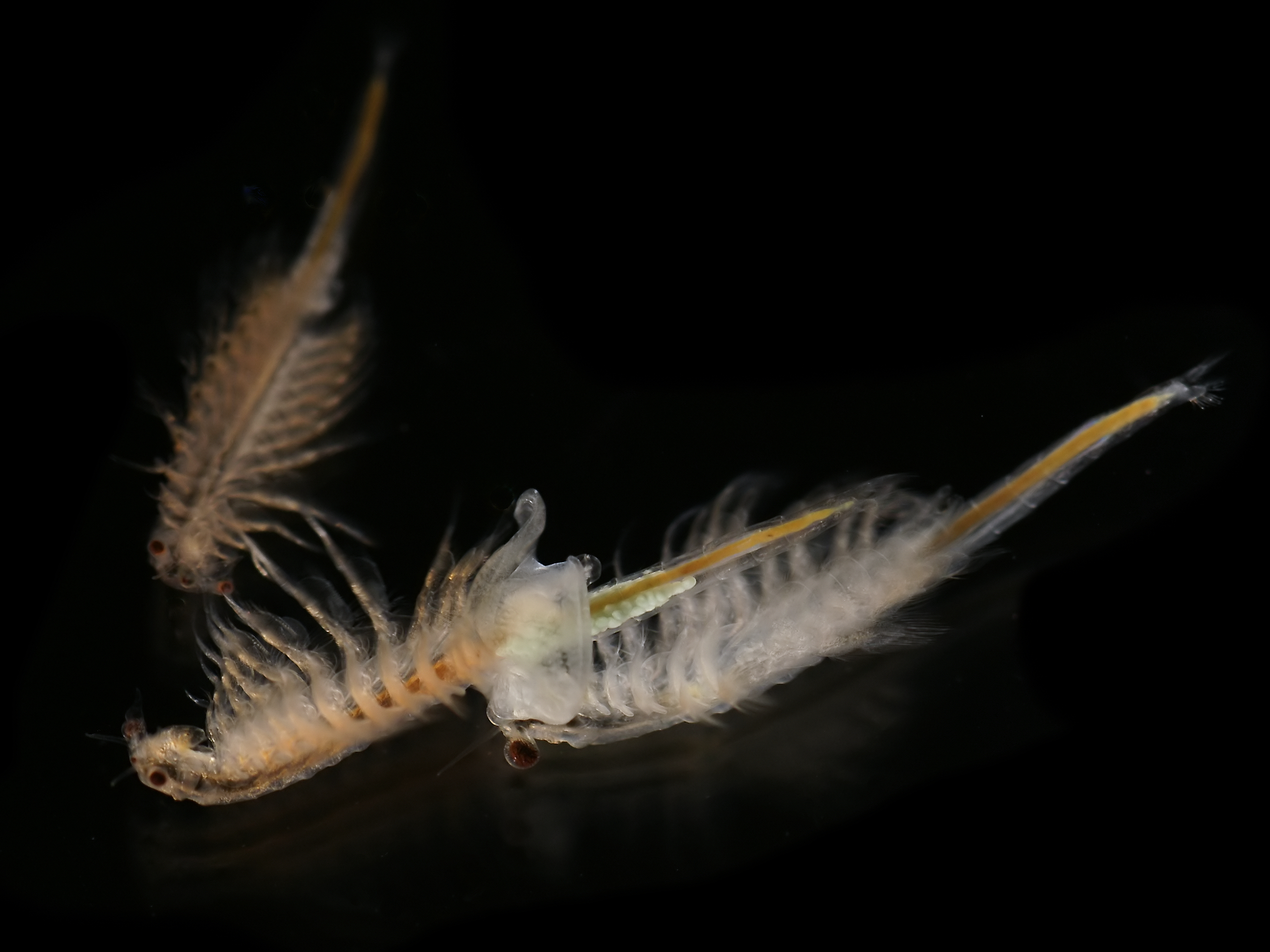
Artemia (Brine shrimp), one of the food sources of birds

Among the reasons for the increase in animal species, especially birds, is the presence of Brine shrimp which is one of the most resistant species to salinity. During the reproductive period, Brine shrimp releases up to 40 eggs in the water due to the conditions of increasing the concentration of water solutes, changing the temperature and changing the amount of oxygen due to shock. In this case, the eggs grow to the gastrula stage. Brine shrimp is the best food for birds and it lives for about 20 days.

In addition to the mentioned species, some wild animals such as wolves, foxes, snakes and all kinds of lizards also live in the areas around the wetland.

== Challenges ==
According to experts, excessive mining of wetlands will destroy it. This issue will cause the soil of the lagoon to loosen, which in the long process can endanger the lives of the residents of Arak city. The most important problems that threaten the wetland environment include the following:

- Building a road inside the wetland and separating its north and south from each other
- Construction of a dam upstream of the catchment basin and reducing the water entering the wetland
- Entering the wastewater treatment plant of Arak city, the wastewater of Khair Abad and Ibak Abad industrial towns, and agricultural effluents into this wetland
- Increasing the extraction of sodium sulfate by auctioning the wetland
- Using land for livestock grazing beyond the capacity of the area
- Illegal hunting of birds and live capture of birds by village people
- The existence of the Arak airport project, sewage treatment plant and factory Iran's mineral salts on the edge of the wetland without environmental assessment
- Helping to increase the air pollution of Arak due to its proximity to the industrial towns of Khairabad and Eybakabad
- An increase in the amount of fine dust in the air of Arak due to high evaporation in the region.
- In April and May 1402, nearly 400 hectares of Miqan wetland burned in a fire.
