= Sahlabad, Markazi =

Village in Markazi province, Iran

Sahlabad Persian: سهل اباد
- Village
- Location within Iran
- Coordinates: 34°13′38″N 49°59′21″E
- Country: Iran
- Province: Markazi
- County: Arak
- District: Masumiyeh
- Rural District: Moshkabad

Population (2016)
  - Total: 522
- Time zone: UTC+3:30 (IRST)

Sahlabad (Persian: سهل اباد) (Note: Also romanized as Sahlābād; also known as Şaleḩābād and Sālīhābād) is a village in Moshkabad Rural District of Masumiyeh District in Arak County, Markazi province, Iran.

== Demographics ==
=== Population ===
At the time of the 2006 National Census, the village's population was 693 in 165 households, when it was in the Central District. The following census in 2011 counted 677 people in 181 households, by which time the rural district had been separated from the district in the formation of Masumiyeh District. The 2016 census measured the population of the village as 522 people in 158 households.
