= Shahsavaran =

Village in Markazi province, Iran

Shahsavaran Persian: شهسواران
- Village
- Location within Iran
- Coordinates: 34°10′24″N 50°01′19″E
- Country: Iran
- Province: Markazi
- County: Arak
- District: Masumiyeh
- Rural District: Moshkabad

Population (2016)
  - Total: 863
- Time zone: UTC+3:30 (IRST)

Shahsavaran (Persian: شهسواران) (Note: Also romanized as Shāhsavārān; also known as Shāhsavār) is a village in Moshkabad Rural District of Masumiyeh District in Arak County, Markazi province, Iran.

== Demographics ==
=== Population ===
At the time of the 2006 National Census, the village's population was 864 in 254 households, when it was in the Central District. The following census in 2011 counted 846 people in 282 households, by which time the rural district had been separated from the district in the formation of Masumiyeh District. The 2016 census measured the population of the village as 863 people in 302 households.
