= Mirabad, Markazi =

Village in Markazi province, Iran

Mirabad Persian: ميراباد
- Village
- Location within Iran
- Coordinates: 34°11′10″N 50°00′12″E
- Country: Iran
- Province: Markazi
- County: Arak
- District: Masumiyeh
- Rural District: Moshkabad

Population (2016)
  - Total: 17
- Time zone: UTC+3:30 (IRST)

Mirabad (Persian: ميراباد) (Note: Also romanized as Mīrābād) is a village in Moshkabad Rural District of Masumiyeh District in Arak County, Markazi province, Iran.

== Demographics ==
=== Population ===
At the time of the 2006 National Census, the village's population was 33 in eight households, when it was in the Central District. The following census in 2011 counted 24 people in eight households, by which time the rural district had been separated from the district in the formation of Masumiyeh District. The 2016 census measured the population of the village as 17 people in seven households.
