= Omarabad, Markazi =

Village in Markazi province, Iran

Omarabad Persian: عمراباد
- Village
- Location within Iran
- Coordinates: 34°10′11″N 50°03′54″E
- Country: Iran
- Province: Markazi
- County: Arak
- District: Masumiyeh
- Rural District: Moshkabad

Population (2016)
  - Total: 686
- Time zone: UTC+3:30 (IRST)

Omrabad (Persian: امرآباد) (Note: Also romanized as Amrabad, ‘Amrābād, and ‘Omarābād; also known as ‘Amrowābād) is a village in Moshkabad Rural District of Masumiyeh District in Arak County, Markazi province, Iran.

== Demographics ==
=== Population ===
At the time of the 2006 National Census, the village's population was 948 in 294 households, when it was in the Central District. The following census in 2011 counted 843 people in 280 households, by which time the rural district had been separated from the district in the formation of Masumiyeh District. The 2016 census measured the population of the village as 686 people in 260 households.
