= Cheshmeh Khurzan =

Village in Markazi province, Iran

Cheshmeh Khurzan Persian: چشمه خورزن
- Village
- Location within Iran
- Coordinates: 34°17′32″N 50°04′23″E
- Country: Iran
- Province: Markazi
- County: Arak
- District: Masumiyeh
- Rural District: Moshkabad

Population (2016)
  - Total: 173
- Time zone: UTC+3:30 (IRST)

Cheshmeh Khurzan (Persian: چشمه خورزن) (Note: Also romanized as Cheshmeh Khūrzan; also known as Chashmeh and Cheshmeh Moshg Abad) is a village in Moshkabad Rural District of Masumiyeh District in Arak County, Markazi province, Iran.

== Demographics ==
=== Population ===
At the time of the 2006 National Census, the village's population was 341 in 124 households, when it was in the Central District. The following census in 2011 counted 229 people in 96 households, by which time the rural district had been separated from the district in the formation of Masumiyeh District. The 2016 census measured the population of the village as 173 people in 80 households.
