= Aliabad, Moshkabad =

Village in Markazi province, Iran

Aliabad Persian: علي اباد
- Village
- Location within Iran
- Coordinates: 34°11′00″N 50°00′55″E
- Country: Iran
- Province: Markazi
- County: Arak
- District: Masumiyeh
- Rural District: Moshkabad

Population (2016)
  - Total: 154
- Time zone: UTC+3:30 (IRST)

Aliabad (Persian: علي اباد) (Note: Also romanized as ‘Alīābād) is a village in Moshkabad Rural District of Masumiyeh District in Arak County, Markazi province, Iran.

== Demographics ==
=== Population ===
At the time of the 2006 National Census, the village's population was 168 in 41 households, when it was in the Central District. The following census in 2011 counted 162 people in 49 households, by which time the rural district had been separated from the district in the formation of Masumiyeh District. The 2016 census measured the population of the village as 154 people in 49 households.
