= Moshkabad =

Moshkabad or Mashkabad (Persian: مشك اباد), also rendered as Mushkabad or Mashgabad, may refer to:

- Moshkabad, Markazi
- Moshkabad, Qom
- Moshkabad, Razavi Khorasan
- Mashkabad-e Olya, West Azerbaijan Province
- Mashkabad-e Sofla, West Azerbaijan Province
- Moshkabad, Zanjan
- Moshkabad Rural District, in Markazi Province
