= Taramazd =

Village in Markazi province, Iran

Taramazd Persian: طرمزد
- Village
- Location within Iran
- Coordinates: 34°09′27″N 49°47′12″E
- Country: Iran
- Province: Markazi
- County: Arak
- District: Central
- Rural District: Mashhad-e Miqan

Population (2016)
  - Total: 343
- Time zone: UTC+3:30 (IRST)

Taramazd (Persian: طرمزد) (Note: Also romanized as Ţarāmazd; also known as Tārah Mazd, Tareh Mozd, Tarmazd, Tarmozd, and Teramis) is a village in Mashhad-e Miqan Rural District of the Central District in Arak County, Markazi province, Iran.

== Demographics ==
=== Population ===
At the time of the 2006 National Census, the village's population was 425 in 129 households. The following census in 2011 counted 450 people in 153 households. The 2016 census measured the population of the village as 343 people in 113 households.
