= Gavar, Markazi =

Village in Markazi province, Iran

Gavar Persian: گوار
- Village
- Location within Iran
- Coordinates: 33°58′01″N 49°39′36″E
- Country: Iran
- Province: Markazi
- County: Arak
- District: Central
- Rural District: Sedeh

Population (2016)
  - Total: 2,578
- Time zone: UTC+3:30 (IRST)

Gavar (Persian: گوار) (Note: Also romanized as Gavār) is a village in Sedeh Rural District of the Central District in Arak County, Markazi province, Iran.

== Demographics ==
=== Population ===
At the time of the 2006 National Census, the village's population was 2,682 in 784 households. The following census in 2011 counted 2,709 people in 830 households. The 2016 census measured the population of the village as 2,578 people in 879 households, the most populous in its rural district.
