= Khvoshdun =

Village in Markazi province, Iran

Khvoshdun Persian: خوشدون
- Village
- Location within Iran
- Coordinates: 34°21′09″N 49°45′27″E
- Country: Iran
- Province: Markazi
- County: Arak
- District: Central
- Rural District: Davudabad

Population (2016)
  - Total: 281
- Time zone: UTC+3:30 (IRST)

Khvoshdun (Persian: خوشدون) (Note: Also romanized as Khvoshdūn; also known as Khoshdūd, Khoshdūn, and Khūshtūn) is a village in Davudabad Rural District of the Central District in Arak County, Markazi province, Iran.

== Demographics ==
=== Population ===
At the time of the 2006 National Census, the village's population was 406 in 133 households. The following census in 2011 counted 355 people in 122 households. The 2016 census measured the population of the village as 281 people in 96 households.
