= Rasulabad, Markazi =

Village in Markazi province, Iran

Rasulabad Persian: رسول اباد
- Village
- Location within Iran
- Coordinates: 34°06′51″N 49°47′26″E
- Country: Iran
- Province: Markazi
- County: Arak
- District: Central
- Rural District: Hajjiabad

Population (2016)
  - Total: Below reporting threshold
- Time zone: UTC+3:30 (IRST)

Rasulabad (Persian: رسول اباد) (Note: Also romanized as Rasūlābād) is a village in Hajjiabad Rural District of the Central District in Arak County, Markazi province, Iran.

== Demographics ==
=== Population ===
At the time of the 2006 National Census, the village's population was 20 in five households, when it was in Masumiyeh Rural District. The census in 2016 counted a population below the reporting threshold, by which time the village had been transferred to the new Hajjiabad Rural District.
