= Shahrjerd =

Village in Markazi province, Iran

Shahrjerd Persian: شهرجرد
- Village
- Location within Iran
- Coordinates: 34°06′09″N 49°48′25″E
- Country: Iran
- Province: Markazi
- County: Arak
- District: Central
- Rural District: Hajjiabad

Population (2016)
  - Total: 355
- Time zone: UTC+3:30 (IRST)

Shahrjerd (Persian: شهرجرد) (Note: Also romanized as Shahr Jerd; also known as Shahrāgerd, Shahrgerd, and Shahr-ī-Jird) is a village in Hajjiabad Rural District of the Central District in Arak County, Markazi province, Iran.

== Demographics ==
=== Population ===
At the time of the 2006 National Census, the village's population was 390 in 111 households, when it was in Masumiyeh Rural District. The following census in 2011 counted 417 people in 141 households, by which time the village had been transferred to the new Hajjiabad Rural District. The 2016 census measured the population of the village as 355 people in 126 households.
