= Moslehabad =

Village in Markazi province, Iran

Moslehabad Persian: مصلح‌آباد
- Village
- Location within Iran
- Coordinates: 34°22′19″N 49°43′31″E
- Country: Iran
- Province: Markazi
- County: Arak
- District: Central
- Rural District: Mashhad-e Miqan

Population (2016)
  - Total: 311
- Time zone: UTC+3:30 (IRST)

Moslehabad (Persian: مصلح‌آباد) (Note: Also romanized as Moşleḩābād; also known as Musalābād) is a village in Mashhad-e Miqan Rural District of the Central District in Arak County, Markazi province, Iran.

== Demographics ==
=== Population ===
At the time of the 2006 National Census, the village's population was 452 in 159 households. The following census in 2011 counted 337 people in 105 households. The 2016 census measured the population of the village as 311 people in 125 households.
