= Kaleh Namak Kur =

Village in Markazi province, Iran

Kaleh Namak Kur Persian: کله نمک کور
- Village
- Location within Iran
- Coordinates: 34°06′08″N 49°28′46″E
- Country: Iran
- Province: Markazi
- County: Arak
- District: Central
- Rural District: Sedeh

Population (2016)
  - Total: 299
- Time zone: UTC+3:30 (IRST)

Kaleh Namak Kur (Persian: کله نمک کور) (Note: Also romanized as Kaleh Namak Kūr) is a village in Sedeh Rural District of the Central District in Arak County, Markazi province, Iran.

== Demographics ==
=== Population ===
At the time of the 2006 National Census, the village's population was 381 in 113 households. The following census in 2011 counted 310 people in 102 households. The 2016 census measured the population of the village as 299 people in 106 households.
