= Mohammadiyeh, Arak =

Village in Markazi province, Iran

Mohammadiyeh Persian: محمديه
- Village
- Location within Iran
- Coordinates: 34°14′01″N 49°39′04″E
- Country: Iran
- Province: Markazi
- County: Arak
- District: Central
- Rural District: Mashhad-e Miqan

Population (2016)
  - Total: 515
- Time zone: UTC+3:30 (IRST)

Mohammadiyeh (Persian: محمديه) (Note: Also romanized as Moḩammadīyeh; also known as Mohammadi) is a village in Mashhad-e Miqan Rural District of the Central District in Arak County, Markazi province, Iran.

== Demographics ==
=== Population ===
At the time of the 2006 National Census, the village's population was 655 in 183 households. The following census in 2011 counted 640 people in 208 households. The 2016 census measured the population of the village as 515 people in 175 households.
