= Khvorzan-e Olya =

Village in Markazi province, Iran

Khvorzan-e Olya Persian: خورزن عليا
- Village
- Location within Iran
- Coordinates: 33°58′53″N 49°44′45″E
- Country: Iran
- Province: Markazi
- County: Arak
- District: Central
- Rural District: Sedeh

Population (2016)
  - Total: Below reporting threshold
- Time zone: UTC+3:30 (IRST)

Khvorzan-e Olya (Persian: خورزن عليا) (Note: Also romanized as Khvorzan-e ‘Olyā; also known as Khūrzen-e Qadīm, Khūrzīn, and Khvorzīn) is a village in Sedeh Rural District of the Central District in Arak County, Markazi province, Iran.

== Demographics ==
=== Population ===
At the time of the 2006 National Census, the village's population was 26 in eight households. The 2016 census measured the population of the village as below the reporting threshold.
