= Shamsabad, Davudabad =

Village in Markazi province, Iran

Shamsabad Persian: شمس اباد
- Village
- Location within Iran
- Coordinates: 34°21′44″N 49°46′08″E
- Country: Iran
- Province: Markazi
- County: Arak
- District: Central
- Rural District: Davudabad

Population (2016)
  - Total: 45
- Time zone: UTC+3:30 (IRST)

Shamsabad (Persian: شمس اباد) (Note: Also romanized as Shamsābād) is a village in Davudabad Rural District of the Central District in Arak County, Markazi province, Iran.

== Demographics ==
=== Population ===
At the time of the 2006 National Census, the village's population was 44 in 14 households. The following census in 2011 counted 41 people in 15 households. The 2016 census measured the population of the village as 45 people in 16 households.
