= Karvansara, Markazi =

Village in Markazi province, Iran

Karvansara Persian: كاروانسرا
- Village
- Location within Iran
- Coordinates: 33°57′28″N 49°59′32″E
- Country: Iran
- Province: Markazi
- County: Arak
- District: Central
- Rural District: Amanabad

Population (2016)
  - Total: 45
- Time zone: UTC+3:30 (IRST)

Karvansara (Persian: كاروانسرا) (Note: Also romanized as Kārvānsarā; also known as Kārvānsarā-ye Shāh ‘Abbāsī and Qal‘eh-ye Shāh ‘Abbāsī) is a village in Amanabad Rural District of the Central District in Arak County, Markazi province, Iran.

== Demographics ==
=== Population ===
At the time of the 2006 National Census, the village's population was 21 in eight households. The following census in 2011 counted seven people in four households. The 2016 census measured the population of the village as 45 people in 18 households.
