= Ebrahimabad, Moshkabad =

Village in Markazi province, Iran

Ebrahimabad Persian: ابراهيم اباد
- Village
- Location within Iran
- Coordinates: 34°12′07″N 50°02′43″E
- Country: Iran
- Province: Markazi
- County: Arak
- District: Masumiyeh
- Rural District: Moshkabad

Population (2016)
  - Total: 1,593
- Time zone: UTC+3:30 (IRST)

Ebrahimabad (Persian: ابراهيم اباد) (Note: Also romanized as Ebrāhīmābād; also known as Mashkābād, Moshkābād, and Mushkābād) is a village in, and the capital of, Moshkabad Rural District in Masumiyeh District of Arak County, Markazi province, Iran.

== Demographics ==
=== Population ===
At the time of the 2006 National Census, the village's population was 1,738 in 542 households, when it was in the Central District. The following census in 2011 counted 1,617 people in 530 households, by which time the rural district had been separated from the district in the formation of Masumiyeh District. The 2016 census measured the population of the village as 1,593 people in 518 households.
