= Shamsabad, Amiriyeh =

Village in Markazi province, Iran

Shamsabad Persian: شمس اباد
- Village
- Location within Iran
- Coordinates: 34°08′49″N 49°30′06″E
- Country: Iran
- Province: Markazi
- County: Arak
- District: Central
- Rural District: Amiriyeh

Population (2016)
  - Total: 264
- Time zone: UTC+3:30 (IRST)

Shamsabad (Persian: شمس اباد) (Note: Also romanized as Shamsābād) is a village in Amiriyeh Rural District of the Central District in Arak County, Markazi province, Iran.

== Demographics ==
=== Population ===
At the time of the 2006 National Census, the village's population was 366 in 80 households. The following census in 2011 counted 317 people in 93 households. The 2016 census measured the population of the village as 264 people in 80 households.
