= Zamen Jan =

Village in Markazi province, Iran

Zamen Jan Persian: ضامن جان
- Village
- Location within Iran
- Coordinates: 34°01′36″N 49°36′53″E
- Country: Iran
- Province: Markazi
- County: Arak
- District: Central
- Rural District: Sedeh

Population (2016)
  - Total: 1,493
- Time zone: UTC+3:30 (IRST)

Zamen Jan (Persian: ضامن جان) (Note: Also romanized as Ẕāmen Jān; also known as Jamunjān and Zāmerjān) is a village in, and the capital of, Sedeh Rural District in the Central District of Arak County, Markazi province, Iran. The previous administrative center for the rural district was the city of Senjan, now a neighborhood in the city of Arak.

== Demographics ==
=== Population ===
At the time of the 2006 National Census, the village's population was 1,634 in 486 households. The following census in 2011 counted 1,796 people in 618 households. The 2016 census measured the population of the village as 1,493 people in 520 households.
