= Savarabad, Markazi =

Village in Markazi province, Iran

Savarabad Persian: سواراباد
- Village
- Location within Iran
- Coordinates: 33°59′18″N 49°49′21″E
- Country: Iran
- Province: Markazi
- County: Arak
- District: Central
- Rural District: Amanabad

Population (2016)
  - Total: 667
- Time zone: UTC+3:30 (IRST)

Savarabad (Persian: سواراباد) (Note: Also romanized as Savārābād) is a village in Amanabad Rural District of the Central District in Arak County, Markazi province, Iran.

== Demographics ==
=== Population ===
At the time of the 2006 National Census, the village's population was 762 in 186 households. The following census in 2011 counted 671 people in 191 households. The 2016 census measured the population of the village as 667 people in 200 households.
