= Anjirak, Markazi =

Village in Markazi province, Iran

Anjirak Persian: انجيرک
- Village
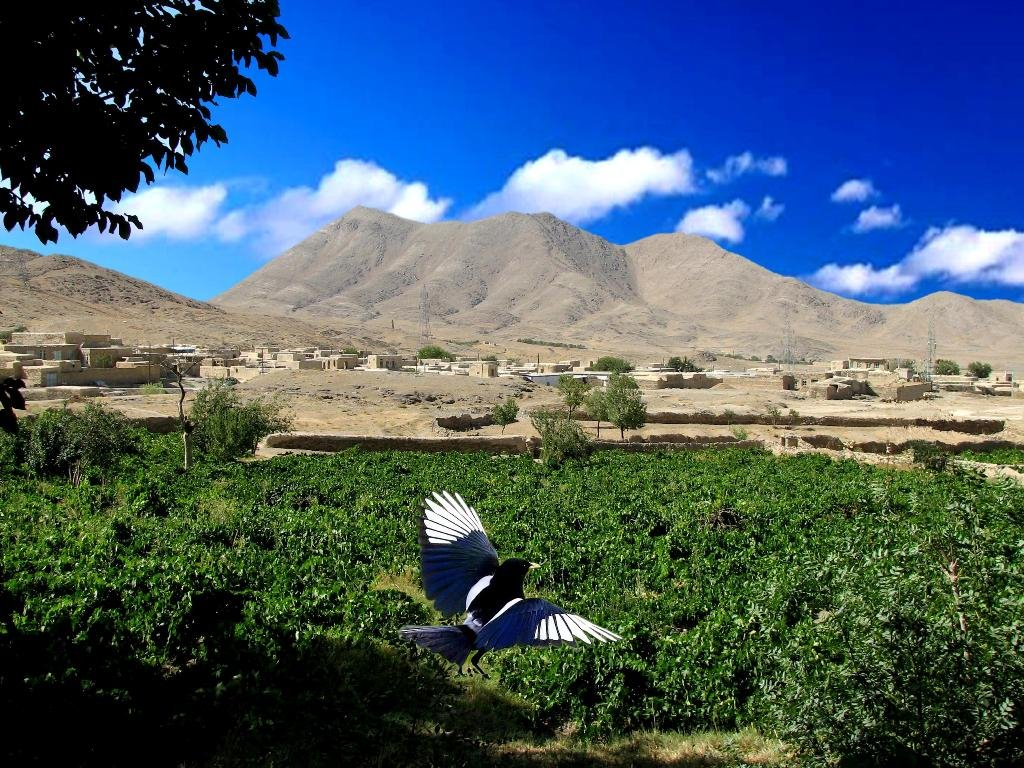
- The village of Anjirak

- Location within Iran
- Coordinates: 34°00′38″N 49°47′59″E
- Country: Iran
- Province: Markazi
- County: Arak
- District: Central
- Rural District: Amanabad

Population (2016)
  - Total: 278
- Time zone: UTC+3:30 (IRST)

Anjirak (Persian: انجيرک) (Note: Also romanized as Anjīrak; also known as Injīlak) is a village in Amanabad Rural District of the Central District in Arak County, Markazi province, Iran.

== Demographics ==
=== Population ===
At the time of the 2006 National Census, the village's population was 303 in 86 households. The following census in 2011 counted 269 people in 86 households. The 2016 census measured the population of the village as 278 people in 90 households.
