= Susanabad, Arak =

Village in Markazi province, Iran

Susanabad Persian: سوسن اباد
- Village
- Location within Iran
- Coordinates: 34°11′52″N 49°39′40″E
- Country: Iran
- Province: Markazi
- County: Arak
- District: Central
- Rural District: Mashhad-e Miqan

Population (2016)
  - Total: 469
- Time zone: UTC+3:30 (IRST)

Susanabad (Persian: سوسن اباد) (Note: Also romanized as Sūsanābād) is a village in Mashhad-e Miqan Rural District of the Central District in Arak County, Markazi province, Iran.

== Demographics ==
=== Population ===
At the time of the 2006 National Census, the village's population was 454 in 117 households. The following census in 2011 counted 563 people in 164 households. The 2016 census measured the population of the village as 469 people in 147 households.
