= Ahmadabad, Arak =

Village in Markazi province, Iran

Ahmadabad Persian: احمداباد
- Village
- Location within Iran
- Coordinates: 34°05′20″N 49°48′44″E
- Country: Iran
- Province: Markazi
- County: Arak
- District: Central
- Rural District: Hajjiabad

Population (2016)
  - Total: 60
- Time zone: UTC+3:30 (IRST)

Ahmadabad (Persian: احمداباد) (Note: Also romanized as Aḩmadābād) is a village in Hajjiabad Rural District of the Central District in Arak County, Markazi province, Iran.

== Demographics ==
=== Population ===
At the time of the 2006 National Census, the village's population was 68 in 16 households, when it was in Masumiyeh Rural District. The following census in 2011 counted 61 people in 16 households, by which time the village had been transferred to the new Hajjiabad Rural District. The 2016 census measured the population of the village as 60 people in 14 households.
