= Saq, Markazi =

Village in Markazi province, Iran

Saq Persian: ساق
- Village
- Location within Iran
- Coordinates: 33°55′50″N 49°58′00″E
- Country: Iran
- Province: Markazi
- County: Arak
- District: Central
- Rural District: Amanabad

Population (2016)
  - Total: 23
- Time zone: UTC+3:30 (IRST)

Saq (Persian: ساق) (Note: Also romanized as Sāq; also known as Sagh and Sāqī) is a village in Amanabad Rural District of the Central District in Arak County, Markazi province, Iran.

== Demographics ==
=== Population ===
At the time of the 2006 National Census, the village's population was 22 in nine households. The following census in 2011 counted 14 people in seven households. The 2016 census measured the population of the village as 23 people in 14 households.
