= Marzijaran =

Village in Markazi province, Iran

Marzijaran Persian: مرزيجران
- Village
- Location within Iran
- Coordinates: 34°08′15″N 49°38′12″E
- Country: Iran
- Province: Markazi
- County: Arak
- District: Central
- Rural District: Amiriyeh

Population (2016)
  - Total: 4,143
- Time zone: UTC+3:30 (IRST)

Marzijaran (Persian: مرزيجران), (Note: Also romanized as Marzījarān and Marzījerān; also known as Marz Jerān, Marz-e Jerān, Marzgīrān, and Marzī Garān) is a village in, and the capital of, Amiriyeh Rural District in the Central District of Arak County, Markazi province, Iran.

== Demographics ==
=== Population ===
At the time of the 2006 National Census, the village's population was 3,081 in 836 households. The following census in 2011 counted 4,545 people in 1,388 households. The 2016 census measured the population of the village as 4,143 people in 1,270 households, the most populous in its rural district.
