= Vismeh =

Village in Markazi province, Iran

Vismeh Persian: ويسمه
- Village
- Location within Iran
- Coordinates: 34°19′01″N 49°44′50″E
- Country: Iran
- Province: Markazi
- County: Arak
- District: Central
- Rural District: Davudabad

Population (2016)
  - Total: 567
- Time zone: UTC+3:30 (IRST)

Vismeh (Persian: ويسمه) (Note: Also romanized as Vīsmeh) is a village in Davudabad Rural District of the Central District in Arak County, Markazi province, Iran.

== Demographics ==
=== Population ===
At the time of the 2006 National Census, the village's population was 594 in 185 households. The following census in 2011 counted 603 people in 208 households. The 2016 census measured the population of the village as 567 people in 199 households.
