= Qanyaruq =

Qanyaruq or Qonyaruq (Persian: قانياروق), also rendered as Qaniaruq or Qanyaroq or Guniarukh, may refer to:

- Qanyaruq-e Bala
- Qanyaruq-e Pain
