= Dineh Kabud =

Village in Markazi province, Iran

Dineh Kabud Persian: دينه كبود
- Village
- Location within Iran
- Coordinates: 33°52′13″N 49°44′28″E
- Country: Iran
- Province: Markazi
- County: Arak
- District: Central
- Rural District: Shamsabad

Population (2016)
  - Total: 301
- Time zone: UTC+3:30 (IRST)

Dineh Kabud (Persian: دينه كبود) (Note: Also romanized as Dīneh Kabūd; also known as Dīneh Kabūd-e ‘Olyā) is a village in Shamsabad Rural District of the Central District in Arak County, Markazi province, Iran.

== Demographics ==
=== Population ===
At the time of the 2006 National Census, the village's population was 434 in 125 households. The following census in 2011 counted 356 people in 119 households. The 2016 census measured the population of the village as 301 people in 101 households.
