= Jamalabad, Arak =

Village in Markazi province, Iran

Jamalabad Persian: جمال اباد
- Village
- Location within Iran
- Coordinates: 33°52′38″N 49°42′47″E
- Country: Iran
- Province: Markazi
- County: Arak
- District: Central
- Rural District: Shamsabad

Population (2016)
  - Total: 210
- Time zone: UTC+3:30 (IRST)

Jamalabad (Persian: جمال اباد) (Note: Also romanized as Jamālābād; also known as Jamal Abad Ghareh Kahriz, and Jamal Abad Ghareh Kariz) is a village in Shamsabad Rural District of the Central District in Arak County, Markazi province, Iran.

== Demographics ==
=== Population ===
At the time of the 2006 National Census, the village's population was 349 in 75 households. The following census in 2011 counted 269 people in 81 households. The 2016 census measured the population of the village as 210 people in 76 households.
