= Kudarz =

Village in Markazi province, Iran

Kudarz Persian: كودرز
- Village
- Location within Iran
- Coordinates: 33°51′58″N 49°51′32″E
- Country: Iran
- Province: Markazi
- County: Arak
- District: Central
- Rural District: Amanabad

Population (2016)
  - Total: 339
- Time zone: UTC+3:30 (IRST)

Kudarz (Persian: كودرز) (Note: Also romanized as Kūdarz; also known as Gūdzar, Kūdzar, and Kūzdar) is a village in Amanabad Rural District of the Central District in Arak County, Markazi province, Iran.

== Demographics ==
=== Population ===
At the time of the 2006 National Census, the village's population was 616 in 213 households. The following census in 2011 counted 532 people in 206 households. The 2016 census measured the population of the village as 339 people in 151 households.
