= Nazmabad, Markazi =

Village in Markazi province, Iran

Nazmabad Persian: نظم اباد
- Village
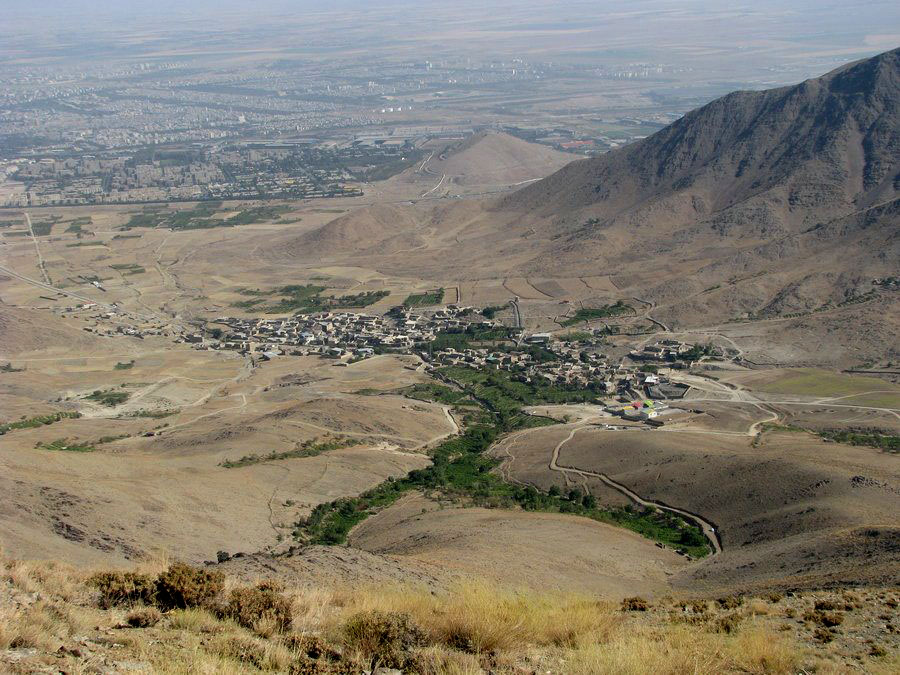
- The village of Nazmabad

- Location within Iran
- Coordinates: 34°03′03″N 49°43′43″E
- Country: Iran
- Province: Markazi
- County: Arak
- District: Central
- Rural District: Sedeh

Population (2016)
  - Total: 653
- Time zone: UTC+3:30 (IRST)

Nazmabad (Persian: نظم‌آباد) (Note: Also romanized as Naz̧mābād; also known as Nizāmābād) is a village in Sedeh Rural District of the Central District in Arak County, Markazi province, Iran.

== Demographics ==
=== Population ===
At the time of the 2006 National Census, the village's population was 453 in 139 households. The following census in 2011 counted 576 people in 182 households. The 2016 census measured the population of the village as 653 people in 210 households.
