= Robat Mil =

Village in Markazi province, Iran

Robat Mil Persian: رباط ميل
- Village
- Location within Iran
- Coordinates: 34°00′58″N 49°32′01″E
- Country: Iran
- Province: Markazi
- County: Arak
- District: Central
- Rural District: Sedeh

Population (2016)
  - Total: 914
- Time zone: UTC+3:30 (IRST)

Robat Mil (Persian: رباط ميل) (Note: Also romanized as Robāţ Mīl and Robāţ-e Mīl; also known as Marān and Robāţ) is a village in Sedeh Rural District of the Central District in Arak County, Markazi province, Iran.

== Demographics ==
=== Population ===
At the time of the 2006 National Census, the village's population was 967 in 279 households. The following census in 2011 counted 978 people in 325 households. The 2016 census measured the population of the village as 914 people in 322 households.
