= Dehlaq, Markazi =

Dehlaq دهلق
- Village
- Location within Iran
- Coordinates: 34°15′29″N 49°39′19″E
- Country: Iran
- Province: Markazi
- County: Arak
- Bakhsh: Central
- Rural District: Mashhad-e Miqan

Population (2006)
  - Total: 117
- Time zone: UTC+3:30 (IRST)
  - Summer (DST): UTC+4:30 (IRDT)

Dehlaq (Persian: دهلق; also known as Dehleh) is a village in Mashhad-e Miqan Rural District, in the Central District of Arak County, Markazi Province, Iran. At the 2006 census, its population was 117, in 30 families.
