= Mehrabad, Arak =

Village in Markazi province, Iran

Mehrabad Persian: مهراباد
- Village
- Location within Iran
- Coordinates: 34°12′05″N 49°34′09″E
- Country: Iran
- Province: Markazi
- County: Arak
- District: Central
- Rural District: Amiriyeh

Population (2016)
  - Total: 402
- Time zone: UTC+3:30 (IRST)

Mehrabad (Persian: مهراباد) (Note: Also romanized as Meharābād and Mehrābād; also known as Magrīābād) is a village in Amiriyeh Rural District of the Central District in Arak County, Markazi province, Iran.

== Demographics ==
=== Population ===
At the time of the 2006 National Census, the village's population was 633 in 183 households. The following census in 2011 counted 568 people in 190 households. The 2016 census measured the population of the village as 402 people in 135 households.
