= Nur-e Eyn =

Nur-e Eyn نورعين
- Village
- Location within Iran
- Coordinates: 33°55′05″N 49°48′15″E
- Country: Iran
- Province: Markazi
- County: Arak
- Bakhsh: Central
- Rural District: Shamsabad

Population (2006)
  - Total: 107
- Time zone: UTC+3:30 (IRST)
  - Summer (DST): UTC+4:30 (IRDT)

Nur-e Eyn (Persian: نورعين, also Romanized as Nūr-e ‘Eyn, Nūr ‘Eyn, Nūr‘ain, and Nūrīn) is a village in Shamsabad Rural District, in the Central District of Arak County, Markazi Province, Iran. At the 2006 census, its population was 107, in 32 families.
