= Saki-ye Sofla =

Saki-ye Sofla ساكي سفلي
- Village
- Location within Iran
- Coordinates: 33°47′45″N 49°48′24″E
- Country: Iran
- Province: Markazi
- County: Arak
- Bakhsh: Central
- Rural District: Shamsabad

Population (2006)
  - Total: 204
- Time zone: UTC+3:30 (IRST)
  - Summer (DST): UTC+4:30 (IRDT)

Saki-ye Sofla (Persian: ساكي سفلي, also Romanized as Sākī-ye Soflá and Sākī Soflá; also known as Sākī-ye Pā’īn and Shāqi) is a village in Shamsabad Rural District, in the Central District of Arak County, Markazi Province, Iran. At the 2006 census, its population was 204, in 56 families.
