= Saqi, Markazi =

Village in Markazi province, Iran

Saqi Persian: ساقی
- Village
- Location within Iran
- Coordinates: 34°06′29″N 49°32′45″E
- Country: Iran
- Province: Markazi
- County: Arak
- District: Central
- Rural District: Amiriyeh

Population (2016)
  - Total: 507
- Time zone: UTC+3:30 (IRST)

Saqi (Persian: ساقی) (Note: Also romanized as Sāqī; also known as Sāgi) is a village in Amiriyeh Rural District of the Central District in Arak County, Markazi province, Iran.

== Demographics ==
=== Population ===
At the time of the 2006 National Census, the village's population was 567 in 134 households. The following census in 2011 counted 577 people in 164 households. The 2016 census measured the population of the village as 507 people in 148 households.
