= Namak Kur =

Village in Markazi province, Iran

Namak Kur Persian: نمک کور
- Village
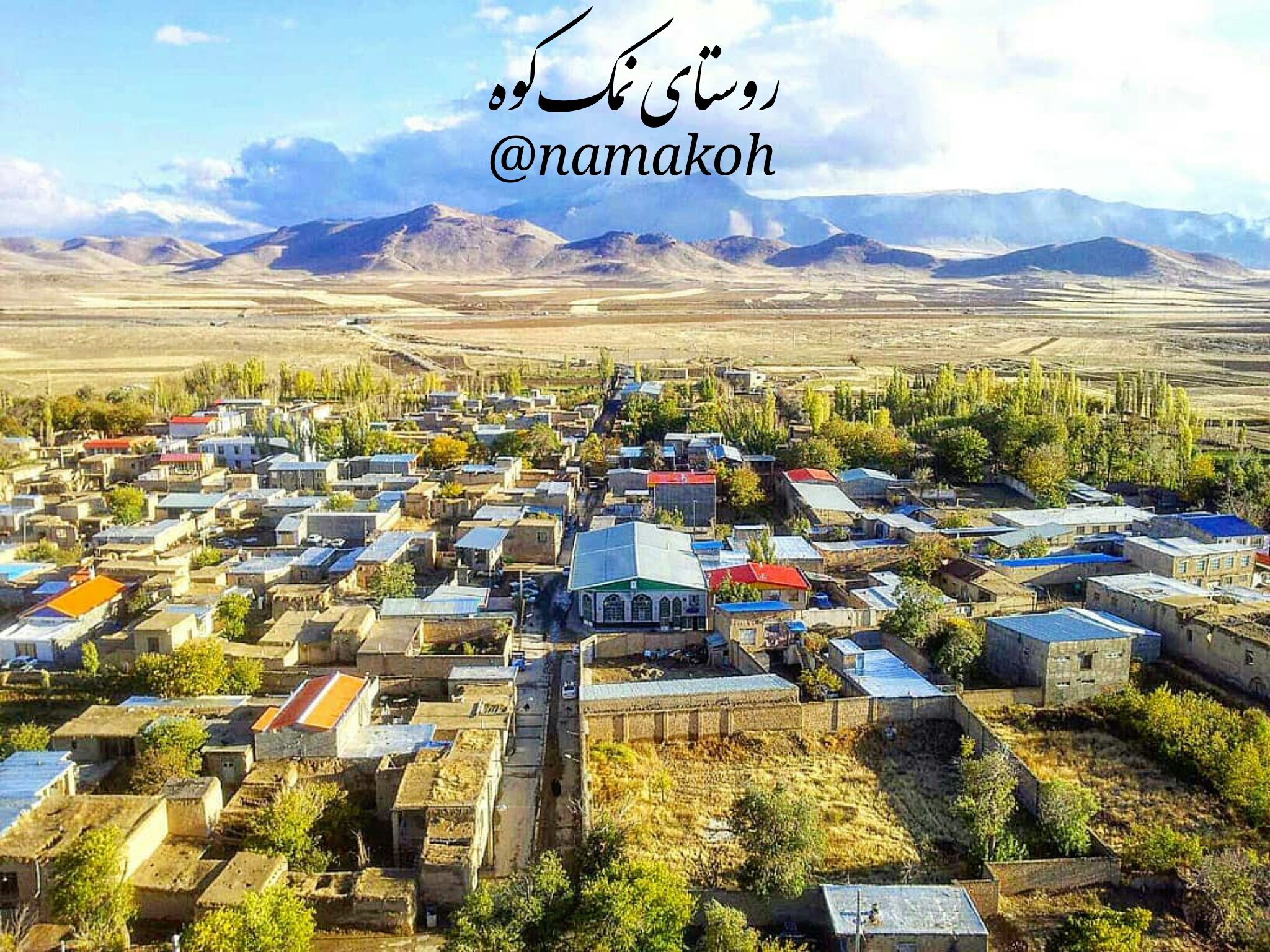
- The village of Namak Kur

- Location within Iran
- Coordinates: 34°03′34″N 49°30′36″E
- Country: Iran
- Province: Markazi
- County: Arak
- District: Central
- Rural District: Sedeh

Population (2016)
  - Total: 376
- Time zone: UTC+3:30 (IRST)

Namak Kur (Persian: نمک کور) (Note: Also romanized as Namak Kūr; also known as Namak Kavīr, Namak Khūr, and Namakho) is a village in Sedeh Rural District of the Central District in Arak County, Markazi province, Iran.

== Demographics ==
=== Population ===
At the time of the 2006 National Census, the village's population was 813 in 232 households. The following census in 2011 counted 664 people in 231 households. The 2016 census measured the population of the village as 376 people in 140 households.
