= Jamalkeh =

Village in Markazi province, Iran

Jamalkeh Persian: جمالكه
- Village
- Location within Iran
- Coordinates: 33°56′10″N 49°51′24″E
- Country: Iran
- Province: Markazi
- County: Arak
- District: Central
- Rural District: Amanabad

Population (2016)
  - Total: 13
- Time zone: UTC+3:30 (IRST)

Jamalkeh (Persian: جمالكه) (Note: Also romanized as Jamālkeh; also known as Jamalgah and Jamālika) is a village in Amanabad Rural District of the Central District in Arak County, Markazi province, Iran.

== Demographics ==
=== Population ===
At the time of the 2006 National Census, the village's population was 16 in eight households. The following census in 2011 counted a population below the reporting threshold. The 2016 census measured the population of the village as 13 people in five households.
