= Neyestan, Markazi =

Neyestan نيستان
- Village
- Location within Iran
- Coordinates: 33°52′48″N 49°44′32″E
- Country: Iran
- Province: Markazi
- County: Arak
- Bakhsh: Central
- Rural District: Shamsabad

Population (2006)
  - Total: 73
- Time zone: UTC+3:30 (IRST)
  - Summer (DST): UTC+4:30 (IRDT)

Neyestan (Persian: نيستان, also Romanized as Neyestān; also known as Neysān) is a village in Shamsabad Rural District, in the Central District of Arak County, Markazi Province, Iran. At the 2006 census, its population was 73, in 21 families.
