= Cheqa, Markazi =

Village in Markazi province, Iran

Cheqa Persian: چقا
- Village
- Location within Iran
- Coordinates: 34°05′22″N 49°46′22″E
- Country: Iran
- Province: Markazi
- County: Arak
- District: Central
- Rural District: Hajjiabad

Population (2016)
  - Total: 126
- Time zone: UTC+3:30 (IRST)

Cheqa (Persian: چقا) (Note: Also romanized as Cheqā and Choqā) is a village in Hajjiabad Rural District of the Central District in Arak County, Markazi province, Iran.

== Demographics ==
=== Population ===
At the time of the 2006 National Census, the village's population was 55 in 13 households, when it was in Masumiyeh Rural District. The following census in 2011 counted 71 people in 19 households, by which time the village had been transferred to the new Hajjiabad Rural District. The 2016 census measured the population of the village as 126 people in 40 households.
