= Aqilabad =

Village in Markazi province, Iran

Aqilabad Persian: عقيل اباد
- Village
- Location within Iran
- Coordinates: 33°59′56″N 49°38′04″E
- Country: Iran
- Province: Markazi
- County: Arak
- District: Central
- Rural District: Sedeh

Population (2016)
  - Total: 1,338
- Time zone: UTC+3:30 (IRST)

Aqilabad (Persian: عقيل اباد) (Note: Also romanized as ‘Aqīlābād; also known as Aghil Abad) is a village in Sedeh Rural District of the Central District in Arak County, Markazi province, Iran.

== Demographics ==
=== Population ===
At the time of the 2006 National Census, the village's population was 1,571 in 441 households. The following census in 2011 counted 1,496 people in 457 households. The 2016 census measured the population of the village as 1,338 people in 443 households.
