= Khaneh Miran, Markazi =

Village in Markazi province, Iran

Khaneh Miran Persian: خانه ميران
- Village
- Location within Iran
- Coordinates: 33°59′38″N 49°34′24″E
- Country: Iran
- Province: Markazi
- County: Arak
- District: Central
- Rural District: Sedeh

Population (2016)
  - Total: 123
- Time zone: UTC+3:30 (IRST)

Khaneh Miran (Persian: خانه ميران) (Note: Also romanized as Khāneh Mīrān; also known as Khāneh-ye Amīrān and Mīrān) is a village in Sedeh Rural District of the Central District in Arak County, Markazi province, Iran.

== Demographics ==
=== Population ===
At the time of the 2006 National Census, the village's population was 105 in 33 households. The following census in 2011 counted 120 people in 38 households. The 2016 census measured the population of the village as 123 people in 42 households.
