= Gav Khaneh =

Village in Markazi province, Iran

Gav Khaneh Persian: گاوخانه
- Village
- Location within Iran
- Coordinates: 34°08′43″N 49°43′30″E
- Country: Iran
- Province: Markazi
- County: Arak
- District: Central
- Rural District: Mashhad-e Miqan

Population (2016)
  - Total: 3,296
- Time zone: UTC+3:30 (IRST)

Gav Khaneh (Persian: گاوخانه) (Note: Also romanized as Gāukhāneh and Gāv Khāneh) is a village in Mashhad-e Miqan Rural District of the Central District in Arak County, Markazi province, Iran.

== Demographics ==
=== Population ===
At the time of the 2006 National Census, the village's population was 506 in 124 households. The following census in 2011 counted 1,595 people in 454 households. The 2016 census measured the population of the village as 3,296 people in 959 households, the most populous in its rural district.
