= Dayen =

Village in Markazi province, Iran

Dayen Persian: داين
- Village
- Location within Iran
- Coordinates: 34°12′13″N 49°32′34″E
- Country: Iran
- Province: Markazi
- County: Arak
- District: Central
- Rural District: Amiriyeh

Population (2016)
  - Total: 269
- Time zone: UTC+3:30 (IRST)

Dayen (Persian: داين) (Note: Also romanized as Dāyen) is a village in Amiriyeh Rural District of the Central District in Arak County, Markazi province, Iran.

== Demographics ==
=== Population ===
At the time of the 2006 National Census, the village's population was 447 in 110 households. The following census in 2011 counted 391 people in 120 households. The 2016 census measured the population of the village as 269 people in 82 households.
