= Khorramabad, Arak =

Village in Markazi province, Iran

Khorramabad Persian: خرم اباد
- Village
- Location within Iran
- Coordinates: 33°47′24″N 49°42′53″E
- Country: Iran
- Province: Markazi
- County: Arak
- District: Central
- Rural District: Shamsabad

Population (2016)
  - Total: 585
- Time zone: UTC+3:30 (IRST)

Khorramabad (Persian: خرم اباد) (Note: Also romanized as Khorramābād; also known as Khūrramābād) is a village in Shamsabad Rural District of the Central District in Arak County, Markazi province, Iran.

== Demographics ==
=== Population ===
At the time of the 2006 National Census, the village's population was 763 in 213 households. The following census in 2011 counted 781 people in 239 households. The 2016 census measured the population of the village as 585 people in 205 households.
