= Hajjiabad, Arak =

Village in Markazi province, Iran

Hajjiabad Persian: حاجي اباد
- Village
- Location within Iran
- Coordinates: 34°04′10″N 49°49′21″E
- Country: Iran
- Province: Markazi
- County: Arak
- District: Central
- Rural District: Hajjiabad

Population (2016)
  - Total: 1,255
- Time zone: UTC+3:30 (IRST)

Hajjiabad (Persian: حاجي اباد) (Note: Also romanized as Ḩājjīābād) is a village in, and the capital of, Hajjiabad Rural District in the Central District of Arak County, Markazi province, Iran.

== Demographics ==
=== Population ===
At the time of the 2006 National Census, the village's population was 948 in 240 households, when it was in Masumiyeh Rural District. The following census in 2011 counted 1,537 people in 429 households, by which time the village had been transferred to the new Hajjiabad Rural District. The 2016 census measured the population of the village as 1,255 people in 366 households.
