= Qozlijeh =

Village in Markazi province, Iran

Qozlijeh Persian: قزليجه
- Village
- Location within Iran
- Coordinates: 34°07′47″N 49°32′01″E
- Country: Iran
- Province: Markazi
- County: Arak
- District: Central
- Rural District: Amiriyeh

Population (2016)
  - Total: 194
- Time zone: UTC+3:30 (IRST)

Qozlijeh (Persian: قزليجه) (Note: Also romanized as Qezlījeh and Qozlījeh; also known as Kujulja and Qezeljeh) is a village in Amiriyeh Rural District of the Central District in Arak County, Markazi province, Iran.

== Demographics ==
=== Population ===
At the time of the 2006 National Census, the village's population was 280 in 76 households. The following census in 2011 counted 270 people in 83 households. The 2016 census measured the population of the village as 194 people in 67 households.
