= Hasanabad, Arak =

Village in Markazi province, Iran

Hasanabad Persian: حسن اباد
- Village
- Location within Iran
- Coordinates: 33°52′30″N 49°53′45″E
- Country: Iran
- Province: Markazi
- County: Arak
- District: Central
- Rural District: Amanabad

Population (2016)
  - Total: 97
- Time zone: UTC+3:30 (IRST)

Hasanabad (Persian: حسن اباد) (Note: Also romanized as Ḩasanābād; also known as Hastanābād and Ḩoseynābād) is a village in Amanabad Rural District of the Central District in Arak County, Markazi province, Iran.

== Demographics ==
=== Population ===
At the time of the 2006 National Census, the village's population was 126 in 36 households. The following census in 2011 counted 102 people in 32 households. The 2016 census measured the population of the village as 97 people in 40 households.
