= Cheshmeh Pahn, Markazi =

Village in Markazi province, Iran

Cheshmeh Pahn Persian: چشمه پهن
- Village
- Location within Iran
- Coordinates: 33°55′25″N 49°39′21″E
- Country: Iran
- Province: Markazi
- County: Arak
- District: Central
- Rural District: Shamsabad

Population (2016)
  - Total: 679
- Time zone: UTC+3:30 (IRST)

Cheshmeh Pahn (Persian: چشمه پهن) is a village in Shamsabad Rural District of the Central District in Arak County, Markazi province, Iran.

== Demographics ==
=== Population ===
At the time of the 2006 National Census, the village's population was 767 in 209 households. The following census in 2011 counted 658 people in 198 households. The 2016 census measured the population of the village as 679 people in 227 households.
