= Hoseynabad, Arak =

Village in Markazi province, Iran

Hoseynabad Persian: حسين اباد
- Village
- Location within Iran
- Coordinates: 34°01′44″N 49°46′32″E
- Country: Iran
- Province: Markazi
- County: Arak
- District: Central
- Rural District: Hajjiabad

Population (2016)
  - Total: 189
- Time zone: UTC+3:30 (IRST)

Hoseynabad (Persian: حسين اباد) (Note: Also romanized as Hosein Abad and Ḩoseynābād; also known as Ḩoseynābād-e Baghdādī) is a village in Hajjiabad Rural District of the Central District in Arak County, Markazi province, Iran.

== Demographics ==
=== Population ===
At the time of the 2006 National Census, the village's population was 176 in 47 households, when it was in Masumiyeh Rural District. The following census in 2011 counted 209 people in 58 households, by which time the village had been transferred to the new Hajjiabad Rural District. The 2016 census measured the population of the village as 189 people in 60 households.
