= Baghdadi, Markazi =

Village in Markazi province, Iran

Baghdadi Persian: بغدادي
- Village
- Location within Iran
- Coordinates: 34°02′13″N 49°45′34″E
- Country: Iran
- Province: Markazi
- County: Arak
- District: Central
- Rural District: Hajjiabad

Population (2016)
  - Total: 119
- Time zone: UTC+3:30 (IRST)

Baghdadi (Persian: بغدادي) (Note: Also romanized as Baghdādī; also known as Baghdād Darreh) is a village in Hajjiabad Rural District of the Central District in Arak County, Markazi province, Iran.

== Demographics ==
=== Population ===
At the time of the 2006 National Census, the village's population was 152 in 48 households, when it was in Masumiyeh Rural District. The following census in 2011 counted 140 people in 50 households, by which time the village had been transferred to the new Hajjiabad Rural District. The 2016 census measured the population of the village as 119 people in 42 households.
