= Rudbaran =

Village in Markazi province, Iran

Rudbaran Persian: رودباران
- Village
- Location within Iran
- Coordinates: 33°55′19″N 49°56′17″E
- Country: Iran
- Province: Markazi
- County: Arak
- District: Central
- Rural District: Amanabad

Population (2016)
  - Total: 93
- Time zone: UTC+3:30 (IRST)

Rudbaran (Persian: رودباران) (Note: Also romanized as Rood Baran and Rūdbārān; also known as Rūd Yārān) is a village in Amanabad Rural District of the Central District in Arak County, Markazi province, Iran.

== Demographics ==
=== Population ===
At the time of the 2006 National Census, the village's population was 163 in 58 households. The following census in 2011 counted 135 people in 45 households. The 2016 census measured the population of the village as 93 people in 31 households.
