= Gili, Iran =

Village in Markazi province, Iran

Gili Persian: گيلي
- Village
- Location within Iran
- Coordinates: 33°53′55″N 49°53′15″E
- Country: Iran
- Province: Markazi
- County: Arak
- District: Central
- Rural District: Amanabad

Population (2016)
  - Total: 122
- Time zone: UTC+3:30 (IRST)

Gili (Persian: گيلي) (Note: Also romanized as Gīlī and Gilli) is a village in Amanabad Rural District of the Central District in Arak County, Markazi province, Iran.

== Demographics ==
=== Population ===
At the time of the 2006 National Census, the village's population was 280 in 97 households. The following census in 2011 counted 189 people in 66 households. The 2016 census measured the population of the village as 122 people in 58 households.
