= Ban, Iran =

Village in Markazi province, Iran

Ban Persian: بان
- Village
- Location within Iran
- Coordinates: 33°55′59″N 49°41′29″E
- Country: Iran
- Province: Markazi
- County: Arak
- District: Central
- Rural District: Shamsabad

Population (2016)
  - Total: 616
- Time zone: UTC+3:30 (IRST)

Ban (Persian: بان) (Note: Also romanized as Bān; also known as Pām) is a village in Shamsabad Rural District of the Central District in Arak County, Markazi province, Iran.

== Demographics ==
=== Population ===
At the time of the 2006 National Census, the village's population was 694 in 188 households. The following census in 2011 counted 690 people in 217 households. The 2016 census measured the population of the village as 616 people in 199 households.
