= Qasemabad, Arak =

Village in Markazi province, Iran

Qasemabad Persian: قاسماباد
- Village
- Location within Iran
- Coordinates: 33°54′07″N 49°43′13″E
- Country: Iran
- Province: Markazi
- County: Arak
- District: Central
- Rural District: Shamsabad

Population (2016)
  - Total: 981
- Time zone: UTC+3:30 (IRST)

Qasemabad (Persian: قاسماباد) (Note: Also romanized as Qāsemābād; also known as Ghasem Abad Ghareh Kahria and Qāsīmābād) is a village in, and the capital of, Shamsabad Rural District in the Central District of Arak County, Markazi province, Iran.

== Demographics ==
=== Population ===
At the time of the 2006 National Census, the village's population was 879 in 260 households. The following census in 2011 counted 949 people in 301 households. The 2016 census measured the population of the village as 981 people in 307 households, the most populous in its rural district.
