= Gusheh, Markazi =

Village in Markazi province, Iran

Gusheh Persian: گوشه
- Village
- Location within Iran
- Coordinates: 33°57′14″N 49°37′10″E
- Country: Iran
- Province: Markazi
- County: Arak
- District: Central
- Rural District: Shamsabad

Population (2016)
  - Total: 269
- Time zone: UTC+3:30 (IRST)

Gusheh (Persian: گوشه) (Note: Also romanized as Gūsheh; also known as Goosheh Ghareh Kahriz) is a village in Shamsabad Rural District of the Central District in Arak County, Markazi province, Iran.

== Demographics ==
=== Population ===
At the time of the 2006 National Census, the village's population was 295 in 76 households. The following census in 2011 counted 314 people in 87 households. The 2016 census measured the population of the village as 269 people in 85 households.
