= Mashhad-e Miqan =

Village in Markazi province, Iran

Mashhad-e Miqan Persian: مشهدميقان
- Village
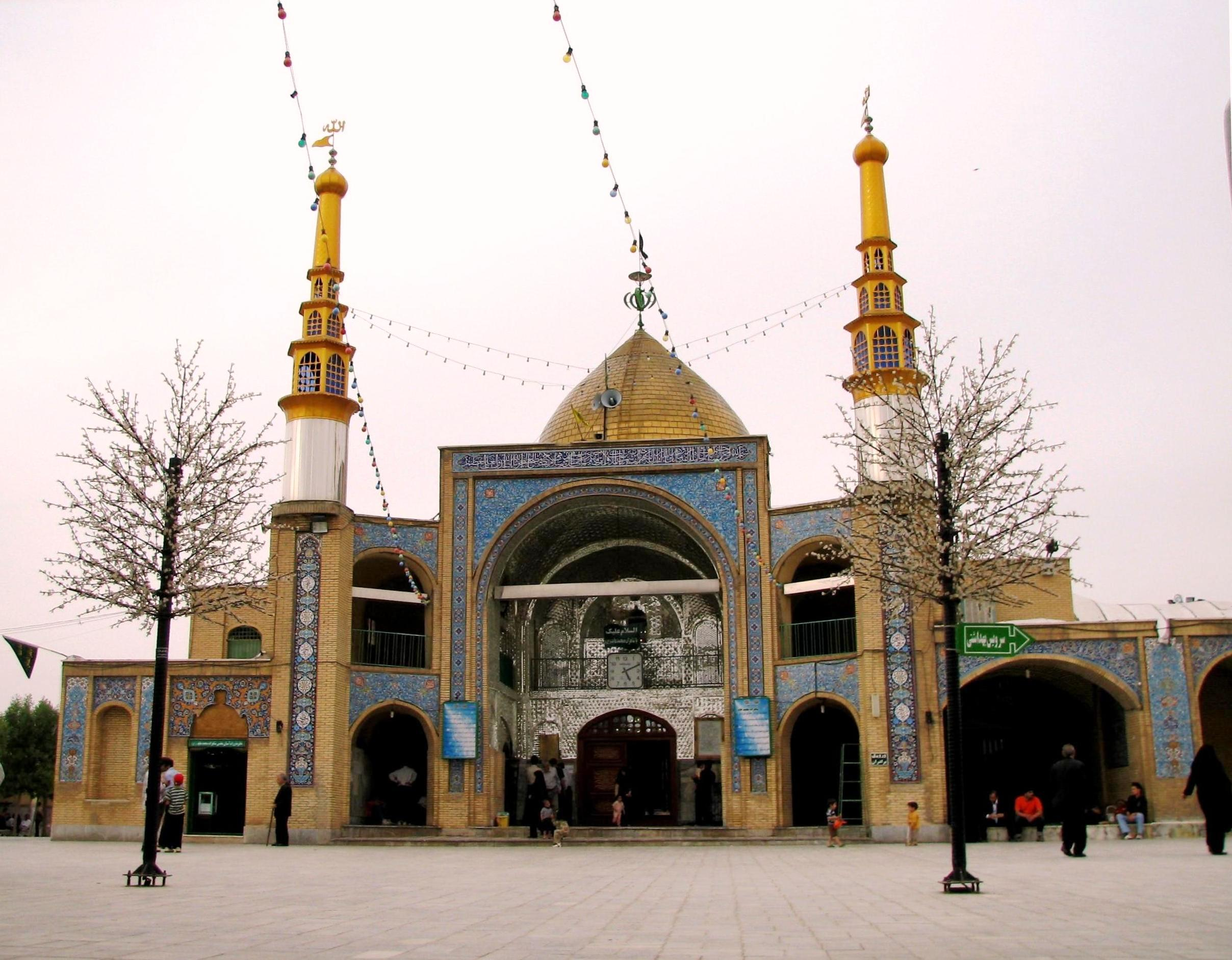
- The village of Mashhad-e Miqan

- Location within Iran
- Coordinates: 34°12′34″N 49°41′33″E
- Country: Iran
- Province: Markazi
- County: Arak
- District: Central
- Rural District: Mashhad-e Miqan

Population (2016)
  - Total: 237
- Time zone: UTC+3:30 (IRST)

Mashhad-e Miqan (Persian: مشهدميقان) (Note: Also romanized as Mashhad-e Meyqān, Mashhad-e Mīqān, and Mash’had-e-Mīyqān; also known as Mashhad-e Mīghān and Meshed) is a village in Mashhad-e Miqan Rural District of the Central District in Arak County, Markazi province, Iran.

== Demographics ==
=== Population ===
At the time of the 2006 National Census, the village's population was 338 in 97 households. The following census in 2011 counted 308 people in 95 households. The 2016 census measured the population of the village as 237 people in 94 households.
