= Shaneq, Arak =

Village in Markazi province, Iran

Shaneq Persian: شانق
- Village
- Location within Iran
- Coordinates: 34°01′37″N 50°12′57″E
- Country: Iran
- Province: Markazi
- County: Arak
- District: Masumiyeh
- Rural District: Moshkabad

Population (2016)
  - Total: 140
- Time zone: UTC+3:30 (IRST)

Shaneq (Persian: شانق) (Note: Also romanized as Shāneq) is a village in Moshkabad Rural District of Masumiyeh District in Arak County, Markazi province, Iran.

== Demographics ==
=== Population ===
At the time of the 2006 National Census, the village's population was 242 in 60 households, when it was in the Central District. The following census in 2011 counted 181 people in 46 households, by which time the rural district had been separated from the district in the formation of Masumiyeh District. The 2016 census measured the population of the village as 140 people in 44 households.
