= Halimabad =

Halimabad (Persian: حاليماباد) may refer to:

- Halimabad, Markazi
- Halimabad, North Khorasan
