= Deh Namak =

Deh Namak or Deh-e Namak (Persian: ده نمك) may refer to:

- Deh-e Namak, Markazi
- Deh Namak, Semnan
