= Shaqi =

Shaqi (Persian: شاقي) may refer to:

- Shaqi-ye Olya
- Shaqi-ye Sofla
