= Hazaveh =

Village in Markazi province, Iran

Hazaveh Persian: هزاوه
- Village
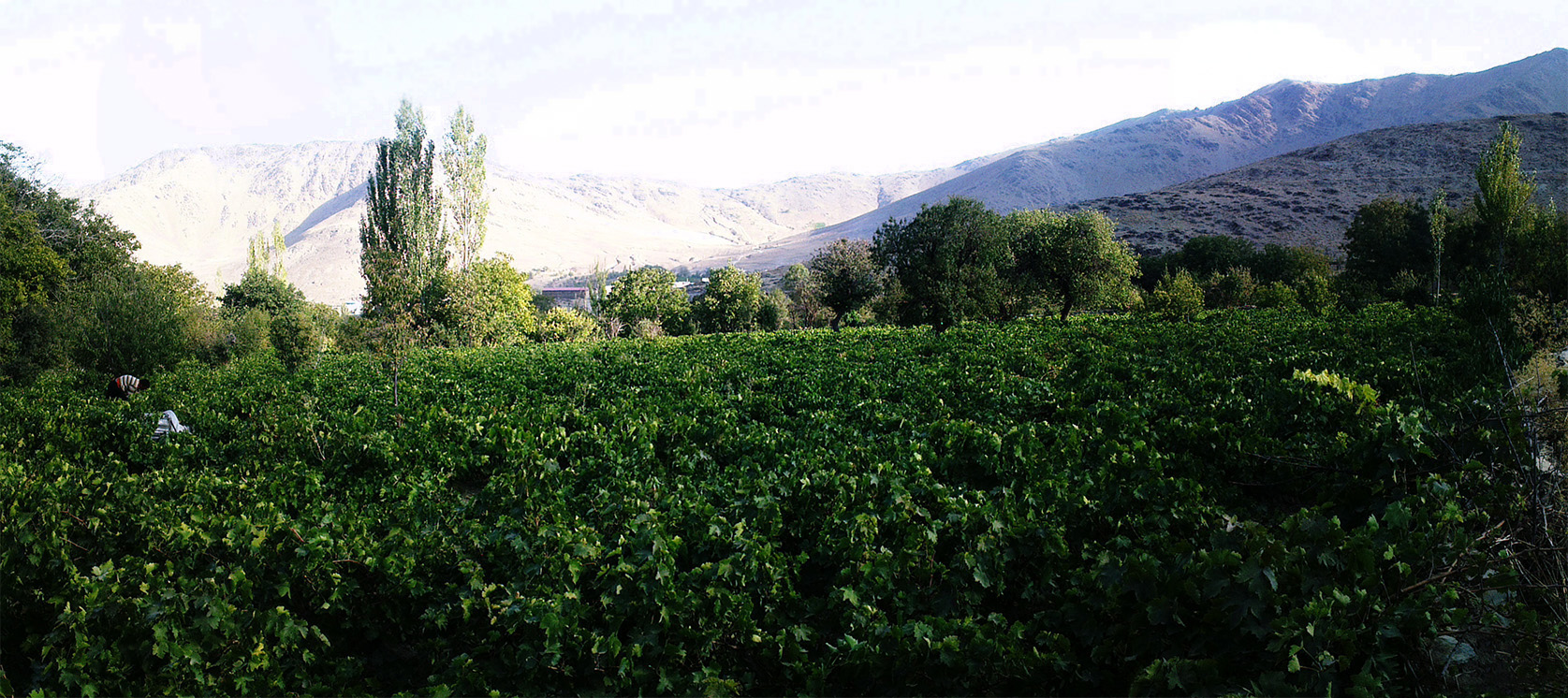
- Vineyards in the village of Hazaveh

- Location within Iran
- Coordinates: 34°10′44″N 49°32′07″E
- Country: Iran
- Province: Markazi
- County: Arak
- District: Central
- Rural District: Amiriyeh

Population (2016)
  - Total: 1,184
- Time zone: UTC+3:30 (IRST)

Hazaveh (Persian: هزاوه) (Note: Also romanized as Hazāveh; also known as Hazāreh, Hīzāveh, and Hizāwah) is a village in Amiriyeh Rural District of the Central District in Arak County, Markazi province, Iran.

== Demographics ==
=== Population ===
At the time of the 2006 National Census, the village's population was 1,587 in 474 households. The following census in 2011 counted 1,449 people in 497 households. The 2016 census measured the population of the village as 1,184 people in 438 households.
