= Tarlan, Arak =

Village in Markazi province, Iran

Tarlan Persian: طرلان
- Village
- Location within Iran
- Coordinates: 34°06′33″N 49°31′12″E
- Country: Iran
- Province: Markazi
- County: Arak
- District: Central
- Rural District: Amiriyeh

Population (2016)
  - Total: 407
- Time zone: UTC+3:30 (IRST)

Tarlan (Persian: طرلان) (Note: Also romanized as Ţarlān and Tarlān; also known as Tardād, Tardān, and Thardān) is a village in Amiriyeh Rural District of the Central District in Arak County, Markazi province, Iran.

== Demographics ==
=== Population ===
At the time of the 2006 National Census, the village's population was 571 in 161 households. The following census in 2011 counted 474 people in 156 households. The 2016 census measured the population of the village as 407 people in 144 households.
