= Haj Wakil Castle =

Castle in Markazi Province, Iran

Haj Wakil castle
- قلعه حاج وکیل
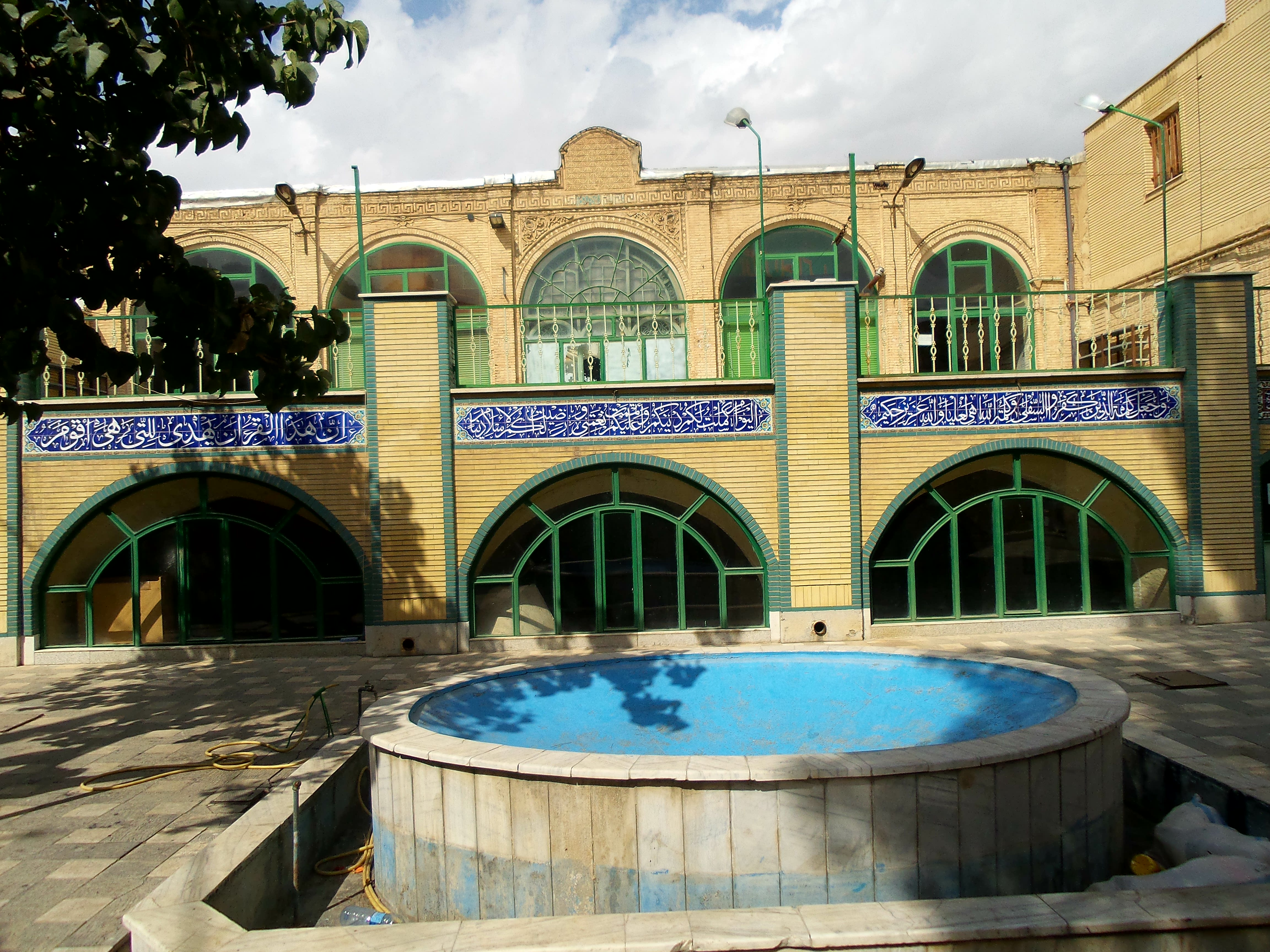
- Interactive map of the Haj Wakil castle area

General information
- Type: Castle
- Location: Arak, Iran
- Coordinates: 34°05′01″N 49°40′53″E

Haj Wakil castle (Persian: قلعه حاج وکیل) is a historical castle located in Arak County in Markazi Province, The longevity of this fortress dates back to the Qajar dynasty.
