= Jameh Mosque of Arak =

Mosque in Arak, Iran

- مسجد جامع اراک
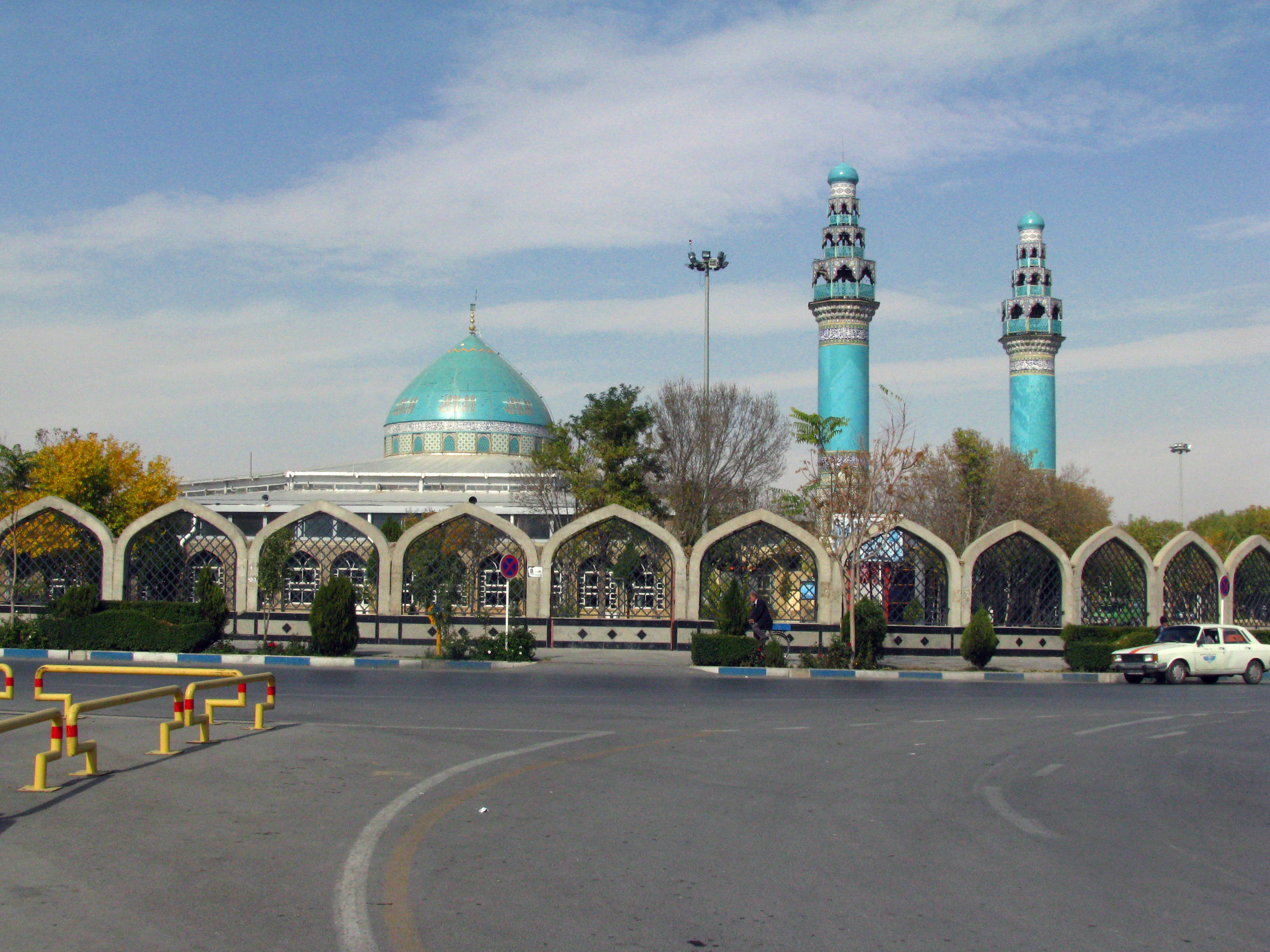
- The mosque in 2012

- Location of the mosque in Iran

Religion
- Affiliation: Shia Islam
- Ecclesiastical or organizational status: Friday mosque
- Status: Active

Location
- Location: Arak, Markazi
- Country: Iran
- Interactive map of Jameh Mosque of Arak
- Coordinates: 34°9′59.8″N 49°24′44.3″E

Architecture
- Type: Mosque architecture
- Style: Qajar
- Completed: c.19th century

Specifications
- Dome: One
- Minaret: Two

The Jameh Mosque of Arak (Persian: مسجد جامع اراک; Arabic: جامع أراك) is a Friday mosque, located near the Bazaar, in the city of Arak, in the province of Markazi, Iran.

The mosque was completed in the 19th century, during the Qajar era.

== See also ==
- Shia Islam in Iran
- List of mosques in Iran
