= Hazareh =

Hazareh (Persian: هزاوه) may refer to:

- Hazareh, Markazi
- Hazareh, Sistan and Baluchestan
