= Qanyaruq-e Pain =

Village in Markazi province, Iran

Qanyaruq-e Pain Persian: قانياروق پائين
- Village
- Location within Iran
- Coordinates: 34°02′38″N 49°32′40″E
- Country: Iran
- Province: Markazi
- County: Arak
- District: Central
- Rural District: Sedeh

Population (2016)
  - Total: 91
- Time zone: UTC+3:30 (IRST)

Qanyaruq-e Pain (Persian: قانياروق پائين) (Note: Also romanized as Qānyārūq-e Pā’īn; also known as Guniarūkh Pāīn, Qanīāroq-e Pā’īn, Qānyāroq-e Soflá, Qānyārūq-e Soflá, and Qonyārūq-e Soflā) is a village in Sedeh Rural District of the Central District in Arak County, Markazi province, Iran.

== Demographics ==
=== Population ===
At the time of the 2006 National Census, the village's population was 27 in nine households. The following census in 2011 counted 71 people in 24 households. The 2016 census measured the population of the village as 91 people in 31 households.
