= Neysan =

Neysan (Persian: نيسان) may refer to:

- Neysan, Markazi
- Neysan District, in Khuzestan Province
- Neysan Rural District, in Khuzestan Province
