= Eybakabad =

Village in Markazi province, Iran

Eybakabad Persian: ايبك اباد
- Village
- Location within Iran
- Coordinates: 34°15′05″N 49°41′14″E
- Country: Iran
- Province: Markazi
- County: Arak
- District: Central
- Rural District: Mashhad-e Miqan

Population (2016)
  - Total: 581
- Time zone: UTC+3:30 (IRST)

Eybakabad (Persian: ايبك اباد) (Note: Also romanized as Eybakābād) is a village in, and the capital of, Mashhad-e Miqan Rural District in the Central District of Arak County, Markazi province, Iran.

== Demographics ==
=== Population ===
At the time of the 2006 National Census, the village's population was 728 in 207 households. The following census in 2011 counted 724 people in 236 households. The 2016 census measured the population of the village as 581 people in 202 households.
