= Shaneq =

Shaneq or Shanaq (Persian: شانق) may refer to:

- Shaneq, Arak
- Shaneq, Delijan
