= Alimabad =

Village in Markazi province, Iran

Alimabad Persian: عليماباد
- Village
- Location within Iran
- Coordinates: 33°48′37″N 49°41′28″E
- Country: Iran
- Province: Markazi
- County: Arak
- District: Central
- Rural District: Shamsabad

Population (2016)
  - Total: 309
- Time zone: UTC+3:30 (IRST)

Alimabad (Persian: عليم اباد) (Note: Also romanized as ‘Alīmābād; also known as Ḩalīmābād) is a village in Shamsabad Rural District of the Central District in Arak County, Markazi province, Iran.

== Demographics ==
=== Population ===
At the time of the 2006 National Census, the village's population was 351 in 101 households. The following census in 2011 counted 325 people in 102 households. The 2016 census measured the population of the village as 309 people in 110 households.
