= Miqan, Markazi =

Village in Markazi province, Iran

Miqan Persian: ميقان
- Village
- Location within Iran
- Coordinates: 34°12′12″N 49°45′08″E
- Country: Iran
- Province: Markazi
- County: Arak
- District: Central
- Rural District: Mashhad-e Miqan

Population (2016)
  - Total: 195
- Time zone: UTC+3:30 (IRST)

Miqan (Persian: ميقان) (Note: Also romanized as Meyqan, Meyqān, Mīqān, and Mīyqān; also known as Maīghan) is a village in Mashhad-e Miqan Rural District of the Central District in Arak County, Markazi province, Iran.

== Demographics ==
=== Population ===
At the time of the 2006 National Census, the village's population was 396 in 127 households. The following census in 2011 counted 304 people in 111 households. The 2016 census measured the population of the village as 195 people in 75 households.
