= Tardan =

Tardan may refer to:

- Chlorprothixene, a pharmaceutical
- Tardan, Iran, a village in Markazi Province, Iran
