= Nurin =

Nurin may refer to:

- Nurin, Iran, a village in Zanjan Province, Iran
- Nurin, Markazi, a village in Markazi Province, Iran
- Nurin Industrial Complex, in Zanjan Province, Iran
- Murder of Nurin Jazlin
