= Qanyaruq-e Bala =

Village in Markazi province, Iran

Qanyaruq-e Bala Persian: قانياروق بالا
- Village
- Location within Iran
- Coordinates: 34°03′14″N 49°34′30″E
- Country: Iran
- Province: Markazi
- County: Arak
- District: Central
- Rural District: Sedeh

Population (2016)
  - Total: 227
- Time zone: UTC+3:30 (IRST)

Qanyaruq-e Bala (Persian: قانياروق بالا) (Note: Also romanized as Qānyārūq-e Bālā; also known as Guniarūkh Bāla, Qanīāroq-e Bālā, Qānyāroq-e ‘Olyā, Qānyārūq-e ‘Olyā, and Qonyārūq-e ‘Olya) is a village in Sedeh Rural District of the Central District in Arak County, Markazi province, Iran.

== Demographics ==
=== Population ===
At the time of the 2006 National Census, the village's population was 55 in 16 households. The following census in 2011 counted 242 people in 71 households. The 2016 census measured the population of the village as 227 people in 77 households.
