= Shamsabad Rural District =

Shamsabad Rural District (Persian: دهستان شمس‌آباد) may refer to:

- Shamsabad Rural District (Khuzestan Province)
- Shamsabad Rural District (Markazi Province)
