= Dehlaq =

Dehlaq (Persian: دهلق) may refer to:

- Dehlaq, Famenin, Hamadan Province
- Dehlaq, Malayer, Hamadan Province
- Dehlaq, Kermanshah
- Dehlaq, Markazi
