= Amanabad, Markazi =

Village in Markazi province, Iran

Amanabad Persian: امان اباد
- Village
- Location within Iran
- Coordinates: 34°00′30″N 49°54′54″E
- Country: Iran
- Province: Markazi
- County: Arak
- District: Central
- Rural District: Amanabad

Population (2016)
  - Total: 2,135
- Time zone: UTC+3:30 (IRST)

Amanabad (Persian: امان اباد) (Note: Also romanized as Amānābād) is a village in, and the capital of, Amanabad Rural District in the Central District of Arak County, Markazi province, Iran.

== Demographics ==
=== Population ===
At the time of the 2006 National Census, the village's population was 1,926 in 556 households. The following census in 2011 counted 2,000 people in 636 households. The 2016 census measured the population of the village as 2,135 people in 685 households, the most populous in its rural district.
