= Deh-e Namak, Markazi =

Village in Markazi province, Iran

Deh-e Namak Persian: ده نمک
- Village
- Location within Iran
- Coordinates: 34°14′27″N 49°52′12″E
- Country: Iran
- Province: Markazi
- County: Arak
- District: Central
- Rural District: Davudabad

Population (2016)
  - Total: 1,846
- Time zone: UTC+3:30 (IRST)

Deh-e Namak (Persian: ده نمک) is a village in Davudabad Rural District of the Central District in Arak County, Markazi province, Iran.

== Demographics ==
=== Population ===
At the time of the 2006 National Census, the village's population was 1,995 in 533 households. The following census in 2011 counted 1,919 people in 578 households. The 2016 census measured the population of the village as 1,846 people in 592 households, the most populous in its rural district.
