= Karchan, Markazi =

City in Markazi province, Iran

Karchan Persian: كارچان
- City
- Location within Iran
- Coordinates: 34°06′00″N 49°56′01″E
- Country: Iran
- Province: Markazi
- County: Arak
- District: Masumiyeh
- Established as a city: 2011

Population (2016)
  - Total: 3,743
- Time zone: UTC+3:30 (IRST)

Karchan (Persian: كارچان) (Note: Also romanized as Kārchān; also known as Kārchon and Kharshān) is a city in, and the capital of, Masumiyeh District in Arak County, Markazi province, Iran.

== Demographics ==
=== Population ===
At the time of the 2006 National Census, Karchan's population was 3,530 in 964 households, when it was a village in Masumiyeh Rural District of the Central District. The following census in 2011 counted 3,752 people in 1,131 households, by which time the rural district had been separated from the district in the formation of Masumiyeh District. At the same time, Karchan was converted to a city. The 2016 census measured the population of the city as 3,743 people in 1,128 households.
