= Senjan =

Neighborhood in Markazi province, Iran

Senjan Persian: سنجان
- Neighborhood
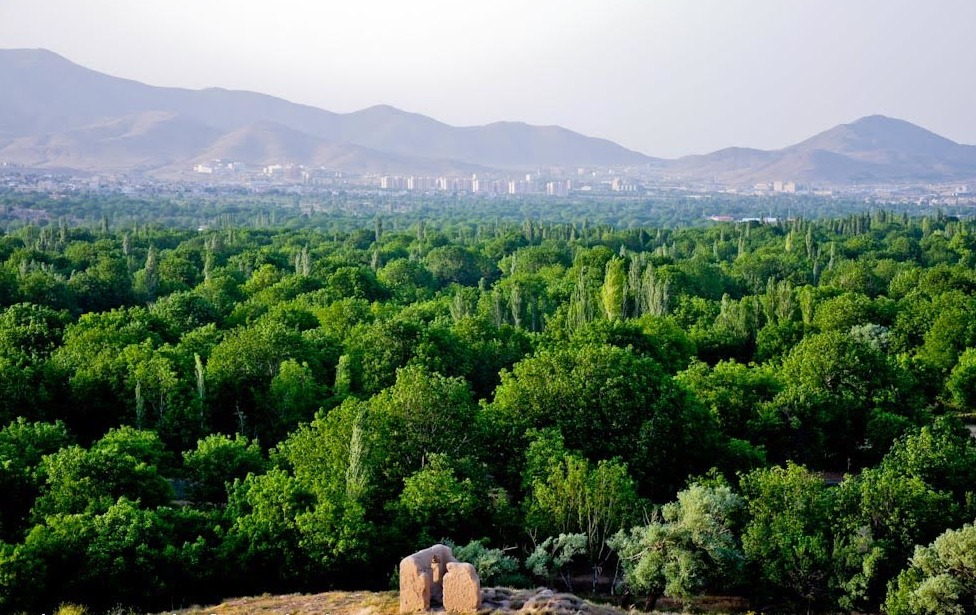
- Gardens in the neighborhood of Senjan

- Location within Iran
- Coordinates: 34°03′02″N 49°37′17″E
- Country: Iran
- Province: Markazi
- County: Arak
- District: Central
- City: Arak

Population (2011)
  - Total: 12,249
- Time zone: UTC+3:30 (IRST)

Senjan (Persian: سنجان) (Note: Also romanized as Senjān; also known as Fenjān, Fījān, Senījān, and Zenjān) is a neighborhood in the city of Arak in the Central District of Arak County, Markazi province, Iran. As a city, it served as the administrative center for Sedeh Rural District until its capital was transferred to the village of Zamen Jan.

== Demographics ==
=== Population ===
At the time of the 2006 National Census, Senjan's population was 10,592 in 2,897 households, when it was a city in the Central District. The following census in 2011 counted 12,249 people in 3,730 households.

In 2013, Senjan and the city of Karahrud were annexed by city of Arak.
