= Amiriyeh Rural District =

Rural district in Markazi province, Iran

Amiriyeh Rural District Persian: دهستان اميريه
- Rural District
- Location within Iran
- Coordinates: 34°10′N 49°34′E
- Country: Iran
- Province: Markazi
- County: Arak
- District: Central
- Established: 1987
- Capital: Marzijaran

Population (2016)
  - Total: 7,379
- Time zone: UTC+3:30 (IRST)

Amiriyeh Rural District (Persian: دهستان اميريه) is in the Central District of Arak County, Markazi province, Iran. Its capital is the village of Marzijaran.

== Demographics ==
=== Population ===
At the time of the 2006 National Census, the rural district's population was 7,532 in 2,054 households. There were 8,664 inhabitants in 2,693 households at the following census of 2011. The 2016 census measured the population of the rural district as 7,379 in 2,36 households. The most populous of its 12 villages was Marzijaran, with 4,143 people.

=== Other villages in the rural district ===
- Dayen
- Hazaveh
- Mehrabad
- Qozlijeh
- Saqi
- Shamsabad
- Tarlan
