= Karahrud =

Neighborhood in Markazi province, Iran

Karahrud Persian: كرهرود
- Neighborhood
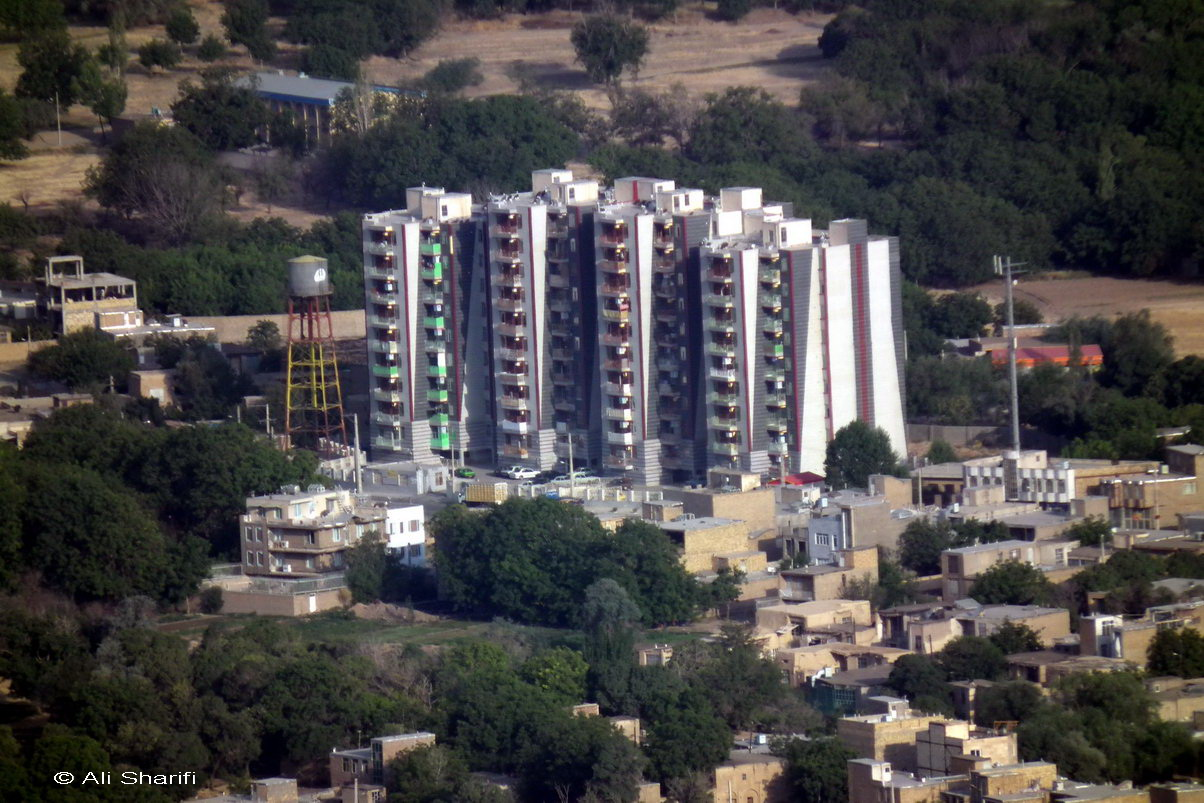
- Residential complex in the neighborhood of Karahrud

- Location within Iran
- Coordinates: 34°03′46″N 49°38′46″E
- Country: Iran
- Province: Markazi
- County: Arak
- District: Central
- City: Arak

Population (2011)
  - Total: 29,721
- Time zone: UTC+3:30 (IRST)

Karahrud (Persian: كرهرود) (Note: Also romanized as Karahrūd and Karehrūd; also known as Kararūt and Qara Rūd) is a neighborhood in the city of Arak in the Central District of Arak County, Markazi province, Iran.

== Demographics ==
=== Population ===
At the time of the 2006 National Census, Karahrud's population was 23,399 in 6,209 households, when it was a city in the Central District. The following census in 2011 counted 29,721 people in 8,782 households.

In 2013, Karahrud and the city of Senjan were annexed by city of Arak.

== Notable people ==
Karahrud is the birthplace of Kurdish historian and prince of Bidlîs, Sharaf Khan Bidlisi (1543-ca. 1603).
