= Davudabad Rural District =

Rural district in Markazi province, Iran

Davudabad Rural District Persian: دهستان داودآباد
- Rural District
- Location within Iran
- Coordinates: 34°18′N 49°51′E
- Country: Iran
- Province: Markazi
- County: Arak
- District: Central
- Established: 1987
- Capital: Davudabad

Population (2016)
  - Total: 2,748
- Time zone: UTC+3:30 (IRST)

Davudabad Rural District (Persian: دهستان داودآباد) is in the Central District of Arak County, Markazi province, Iran. It is administered from the city of Davudabad.

== Demographics ==
=== Population ===
At the time of the 2006 National Census, the rural district's population was 3,039 in 865 households. There were 2,522 inhabitants in 786 households at the following census of 2011. The 2016 census measured the population of the rural district as 2,748 in 906 households. The most populous of its 12 villages was Deh-e Namak, with 1,846 people.

=== Other villages in the rural district ===
- Khvoshdun
- Shamsabad
- Vismeh
