= Sedeh Rural District (Arak County) =

Rural district in Markazi province, Iran

Sedeh Rural District Persian: دهستان سده
- Rural District
- Location within Iran
- Coordinates: 34°01′N 49°38′E
- Country: Iran
- Province: Markazi
- County: Arak
- District: Central
- Capital: Zamen Jan

Population (2016)
  - Total: 8,103
- Time zone: UTC+3:30 (IRST)

Sedeh Rural District (Persian: دهستان سده) is in the Central District of Arak County, Markazi province, Iran. Its capital is the village of Zamen Jan. The previous administrative center for the rural district was the city of Senjan, now a neighborhood in the city of Arak.

== Demographics ==
=== Population ===
At the time of the 2006 National Census, the rural district's population was 8,724 in 2,543 households. There were 8,966 inhabitants in 2,879 households at the following census of 2011. The 2016 census measured the population of the rural district as 8,103 in 2,773 households. The most populous of its 14 villages was Gavar, with 2,578 people.

=== Other villages in the rural district ===
- Aqilabad
- Kaleh Namak Kur
- Khaneh Miran
- Khvorzan-e Olya
- Namak Kur
- Nazmabad
- Qanyaruq-e Bala
- Qanyaruq-e Pain
- Robat Mil
