= Hajjiabad Rural District =

Rural district in Markazi province, Iran

Hajjiabad Rural District Persian: دهستان حاجی‌آباد
- Rural District
- Location within Iran
- Coordinates: 34°06′N 49°50′E
- Country: Iran
- Province: Markazi
- County: Arak
- District: Central
- Established: 2011
- Capital: Hajjiabad

Population (2016)
  - Total: 4,699
- Time zone: UTC+3:30 (IRST)

Hajjiabad Rural District (Persian: دهستان حاجی‌آباد) is in the Central District of Arak County, Markazi province, Iran. Its capital is the village of Hajjiabad.

== History ==
Hajjiabad Rural District was created in the Central District in 2011.

== Demographics ==
=== Population ===
At the time of the 2011 census, the rural district's population was 5,127 in 811 households. The 2016 census measured the population of the rural district as 4,699 in 704 households. The most populous of its 13 villages was Malek Ashtar Garrison, with 2,447 people.

=== Other villages in the rural district ===
- Ahmadabad
- Baghdadi
- Cheqa
- Hoseynabad
- Rasulabad
- Shahrjerd
