= Mashkabad-e Olya =

Mashkabad-e Olya مشك ابادعليا
- Village
- Location within Iran
- Coordinates: 37°33′40″N 45°09′37″E
- Country: Iran
- Province: West Azerbaijan
- County: Urmia
- Bakhsh: Central
- Rural District: Bakeshluchay

Population (2006)
  - Total: 135
- Time zone: UTC+3:30 (IRST)
  - Summer (DST): UTC+4:30 (IRDT)

Mashkabad-e Olya (Persian: مشك ابادعليا, also Romanized as Mashkābād-e ‘Olyā; also known as Mashgābād-e ‘Olyā) is a village in Bakeshluchay Rural District, in the Central District of Urmia County, West Azerbaijan Province, Iran. At the 2006 census, its population was 135, in 41 families.
