= Moshkabad Rural District =

Rural district in Markazi province, Iran

Moshkabad Rural District Persian: دهستان مشك آباد
- Rural District
- Location within Iran
- Coordinates: 34°09′N 50°07′E
- Country: Iran
- Province: Markazi
- County: Arak
- District: Masumiyeh
- Established: 1987
- Capital: Ebrahimabad

Population (2016)
  - Total: 6,449
- Time zone: UTC+3:30 (IRST)

Moshkabad Rural District (Persian: دهستان مشك آباد) is in Masumiyeh District of Arak County, Markazi province, Iran. Its capital is the village of Ebrahimabad.

== Demographics ==
=== Population ===
At the time of the 2006 National Census, the rural district's population (as a part of the Central District) was 7,339 in 2,150 households. There were 6,762 inhabitants in 2,154 households at the following census of 2011, by which time the rural district had been separated from the district in the formation of Masumiyeh District. The 2016 census measured the population of the rural district as 6,449 in 2,172 households. The most populous of its 14 villages was Kheyrabad, with 2,280 people.

=== Other villages in the rural district ===
- Aliabad
- Cheshmeh Khurzan
- Mirabad
- Omarabad
- Sahlabad
- Shahsavaran
- Shaneq
