= Mashhad-e Miqan Rural District =

Rural district in Markazi province, Iran

Mashhad-e Miqan Rural District Persian: دهستان مشهد ميقان
- Rural District
- Location within Iran
- Coordinates: 34°13′N 49°42′E
- Country: Iran
- Province: Markazi
- County: Arak
- District: Central
- Established: 1987
- Capital: Eybakabad

Population (2016)
  - Total: 6,963
- Time zone: UTC+3:30 (IRST)

Mashhad-e Miqan Rural District (Persian: دهستان مشهد ميقان) is in the Central District of Arak County, Markazi province, Iran. Its capital is the village of Eybakabad.

== Demographics ==
=== Population ===
At the time of the 2006 National Census, the rural district's population was 8,830 in 2,527 households. There were 5,444 inhabitants in 1,686 households at the following census of 2011. The 2016 census measured the population of the rural district as 6,963 in 2,238 households. The most populous of its 28 villages was Gav Khaneh, with 3,296 people.

=== Other villages in the rural district ===
- Mashhad-e Miqan
- Miqan
- Mohammadiyeh
- Moslehabad
- Susanabad
- Taramazd
