= Amanabad, Razavi Khorasan =

Amanabad امان اباد
- Village
- Location within Iran
- Coordinates: 36°17′51″N 58°32′28″E
- Country: Iran
- Province: Razavi Khorasan
- County: Firuzeh
- Bakhsh: Central
- Rural District: Takht-e Jolgeh

Population (2006)
  - Total: 273
- Time zone: UTC+3:30 (IRST)
  - Summer (DST): UTC+4:30 (IRDT)

Amanabad (Persian: امان اباد, also Romanized as Amānābād; also known as Amīnābād) is a village in Takht-e Jolgeh Rural District, in the Central District of Firuzeh County, Razavi Khorasan Province, Iran. At the 2006 census, its population was 273, in 70 families.

== See also ==
- List of cities, towns and villages in Razavi Khorasan Province
