= Davudabad =

City in Markazi province, Iran

Davudabad Persian: داودآباد
- City
- Location within Iran
- Coordinates: 34°17′39″N 49°51′22″E
- Country: Iran
- Province: Markazi
- County: Arak
- District: Central
- Established as a city: 2003

Population (2016)
  - Total: 5,491
- Time zone: UTC+3:30 (IRST)

Davudabad (Persian: داودآباد) (Note: Also romanized as Dāvūdābād; also known as Dāvodābād) is a city in the Central District of Arak County, Markazi province, Iran, serving as the administrative center for Davudabad Rural District. The village of Davudabad was converted to a city in 2003.

== Demographics ==
=== Population ===
At the time of the 2006 National Census, the city's population was 5,517 in 1,535 households. The following census in 2011 counted 5,252 people in 1,578 households. The 2016 census measured the population of the city as 5,491 people in 1,824 households.
