= Amanabad, North Khorasan =

Amanabad امان اباد
- Village
- Location within Iran
- Coordinates: 37°27′21″N 57°57′43″E
- Country: Iran
- Province: North Khorasan
- County: Shirvan
- Bakhsh: Central
- Rural District: Ziarat

Population (2006)
  - Total: 124
- Time zone: UTC+3:30 (IRST)
  - Summer (DST): UTC+4:30 (IRDT)

Amanabad (Persian: امان اباد, also Romanized as Amānābād) is a village in Ziarat Rural District, in the Central District of Shirvan County, North Khorasan Province, Iran. At the 2006 census, its population was 124, in 28 families.
