= Amanabad Rural District =

Rural district in Markazi province, Iran

Amanabad Rural District Persian: دهستان امان آباد
- Rural District
- Location within Iran
- Coordinates: 33°57′N 49°57′E
- Country: Iran
- Province: Markazi
- County: Arak
- District: Central
- Established: 1987
- Capital: Amanabad

Population (2016)
  - Total: 4,108
- Time zone: UTC+3:30 (IRST)

Amanabad Rural District (Persian: دهستان امان آباد) is in the Central District of Arak County, Markazi province, Iran. Its capital is the village of Amanabad.

== Demographics ==
=== Population ===
At the time of the 2006 National Census, the rural district's population was 4,682 in 1,412 households. There were 4,205 inhabitants in 1,377 households at the following census of 2011. The 2016 census measured the population of the rural district as 4,108 in 1410 households. The most populous of its 12 villages was Amanabad, with 2,135 people.

=== Other villages in the rural district ===
- Anjedan
- Anjirak
- Gili
- Hasanabad
- Jamalkeh
- Karvansara
- Kudarz
- Rudbaran
- Saq
- Savarabad
