= Bazaar of Arak =

Bazaar in Arak, Iran

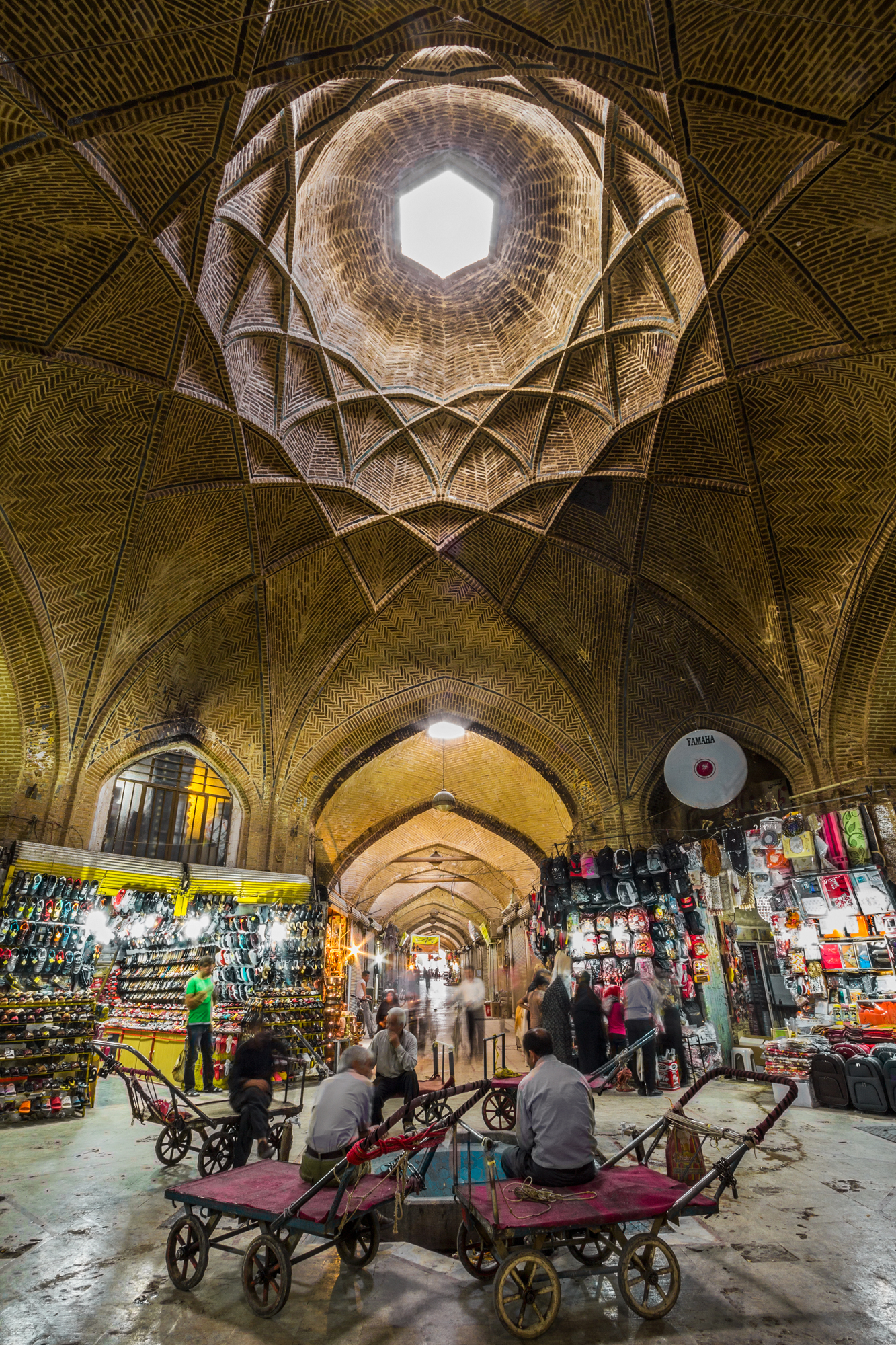
- Mehr Passage, in Bazaar of Arak

General information
- Type: Bazaar
- Architectural style: Qajar
- Location: Arak, Markazi Province, Iran
- Coordinates: 34°5′30″N 49°41′32″E
- Completed: 1855 CE

Technical details
- Material: Bricks; gypsum; lime; clay; copper
- Grounds: 5.7 ha (14 acres)

Iran National Heritage List
- Official name: Bazaar of Arak
- Type: Built
- Designated: 1 November 1976
- Reference no.: 1285
- Conservation organization: Cultural Heritage, Handicrafts and Tourism Organization of Iran

The Bazaar of Arak (Persian: بازار اراک) is a bazaar in Arak, Markazi province, Iran. It was one of the first constructed buildings in the city. The bazaar complex, containing a public bath, a mosque, water reservoirs, passages and caravansary, was built during the reign of Fath-Ali Shah Qajar and by Yusef Khan-e Gorji, in the middle of Sultan Abad (Arak's former name). This bazaar is centered at Chahr soogh, which is the junction of two north–south and east–west paths that end to four ancient city gates.

The bazaar was added to the Iran National Heritage List on 1 November 1976, administered by the Cultural Heritage, Handicrafts and Tourism Organization of Iran.

== History ==
The bazaar and the city of Sultan Abad (today Arak) were built simultaneously. Although it took a few years for the city to be built but no exact date has been recorded for the establishment of bazaar. As noted in historical texts it took about twenty years for the whole city to be built. Bazaar was built at the same time. The first buildings in Arak bazaar were built in 19th century by the order of the time governor of Arak, Sepahdar Aazm whose name has remained on a mosque and a school

One reason to establish this bazaar was the strong economy around Sultan Abad. The high quality of agricultural products in Persian Iraq (Arak) and the world-famous Sarouk Persian carpets brought up the need to establish a central market to present these commodities was the momentum behind constructing city and the market.

== Architecture ==
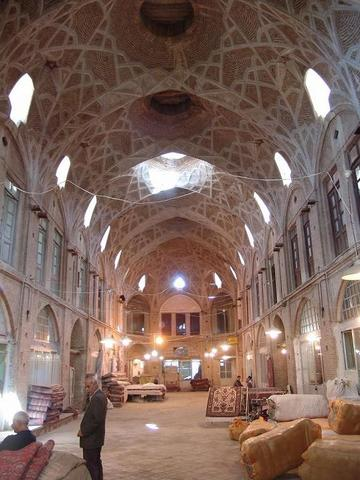
Kashani Passage

The Arak Bazaar Collection is based on a pre-designed plan. Unlike other bazaars here the paths are not free and curved, but routes are geometrically symmetrical. The bazaar, with its crossing alleyways, is an example of chess like texture of the ancient city of Sultan Abad.

The special architectural design used keeps the inside of bazaar cool in summer and warm in winter. The two north–south and east–west axis intersect at a place called chahar soogh (four bazaars). There is a small stone pool right at this junction. The area of the bazaar complex is 5.7 hectares (14 acres).

The buildings in the bazaar are mainly made of bricks. Gypsum and lime have also been used. Wooden joists in clay have made the buildings stronger. Sheets of copper and lead are used in columns' bases.This structure was commissioned by Yusuf Khan Gorji and built by Osta Memarian.

=== Unique features ===
The Bazaar has two east–west and north–south routs which end to four gates of the ancient city, meaning that the at that time the entrance to the city was at Chahar Soogh in bazar. Passages inside are made so that in case of any accident, fire in particular, the crowd can quickly get out and disperse.

The Bazaar of Arak used to contain a 200-year-old water reservoir. It was demolished by Arak's municipality to make room for a new school. This reservoir with its special double ceiling was one of the rare buildings in Iran.

== Functions ==
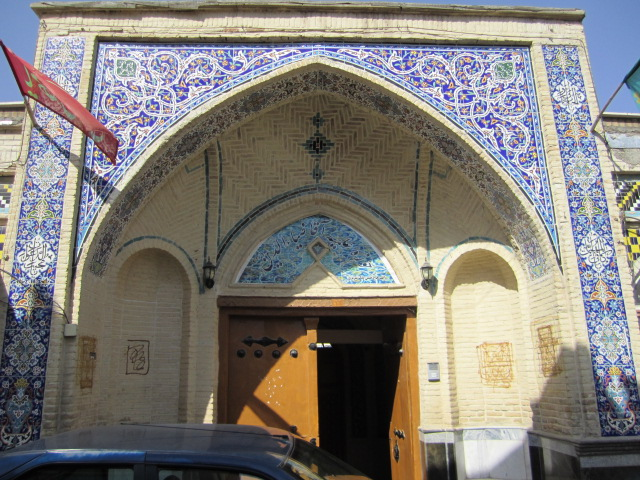
Agha Zia-aldin madrasa

The Bazaar of Arak, like all other bazaars in Iran, is a main center for storing goods and for economic exchanges. The baazar in Arak is now finding its way in internal and global trades. Export of commodities produced in Iran such as dried fruit, handicrafts and handmade carpets, are also done in bazaars.

The Bazaar is also a place that different social and ethnic groups meet and influence on each other. Bazaar is a place for buyer and seller get together which sometimes leads to the formation of the system of supply and demand.

In Iran's history Bazaars have been a center for rebellion and strikes. In the Iranian constitutional revolution Arak and its bazaar became one important center for struggle against foreign investments. Presently, bazaars in Iran are playing an important role in the revolt against the ruling religious dictatorship.

== Gallery ==
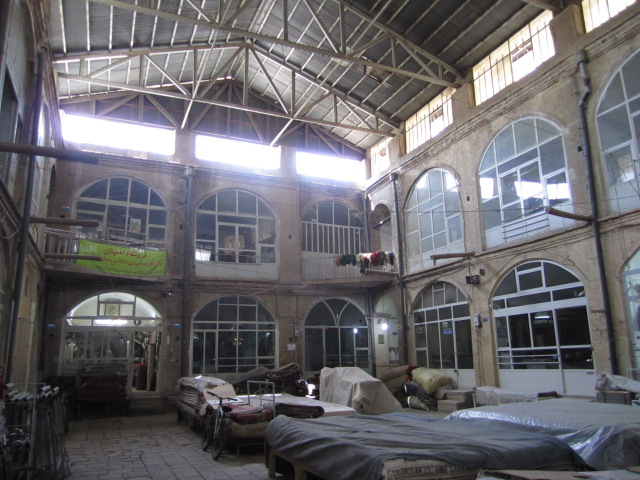
Passage Hazavei ha

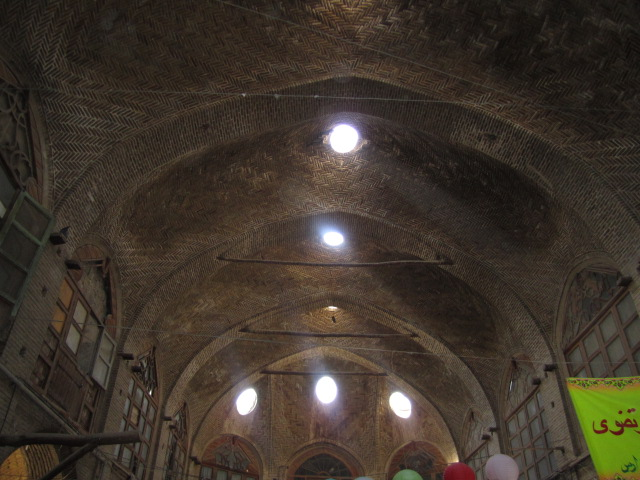
Akbarian Passage

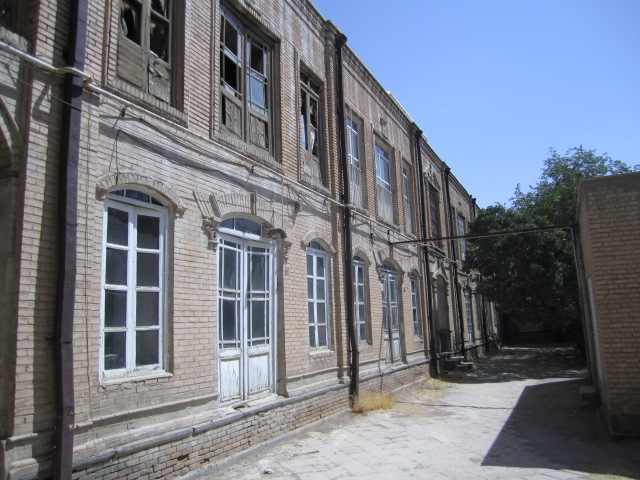
Booksellers
