= Shamsabad Rural District (Arak County) =

Rural district in Markazi province, Iran

Shamsabad Rural District Persian: دهستان شمس آباد
- Rural District
- Location within Iran
- Coordinates: 33°52′N 49°43′E
- Country: Iran
- Province: Markazi
- County: Arak
- District: Central
- Established: 1987
- Capital: Qasemabad

Population (2016)
  - Total: 4,922
- Time zone: UTC+3:30 (IRST)

Shamsabad Rural District (Persian: دهستان شمس آباد) is in the Central District of Arak County, Markazi province, Iran. Its capital is the village of Qasemabad.

== Demographics ==
=== Population ===
At the time of the 2006 National Census, the rural district's population was 6,004 in 1,645 households. There were 5,571 inhabitants in 1,734 households at the following census of 2011. The 2016 census measured the population of the rural district as 4,922 in 1,651 households. The most populous of its 20 villages was Qasemabad, with 981 people.

=== Other villages in the rural district ===
- Alimabad
- Ban
- Cheshmeh Pahn
- Dineh Kabud
- Gusheh
- Jamalabad
- Khorramabad
