= Masumiyeh District =

District in Markazi province, Iran

Masumiyeh District Persian: بخش معصومیه
- District
- Location within Iran
- Coordinates: 34°09′N 50°05′E
- Country: Iran
- Province: Markazi
- County: Arak
- Established: 2011
- Capital: Karchan

Population (2016)
  - Total: 15,889
- Time zone: UTC+3:30 (IRST)

Masumiyeh District (Persian: بخش معصومیه) is in Arak County, Markazi province, Iran. Its capital is the city of Karchan.

== History ==
In 2011, Masumiyeh and Moshkabad Rural Districts were separated from the Central District in the formation of Masumiyeh District.

== Demographics ==
=== Population ===
At the time of the 2011 National Census, the district's population was 16,373 people in 5,115 households. The 2016 census measured the population of the district as 15,889 inhabitants in 5,207 households.

=== Administrative divisions ===
Masumiyeh District Population
Administrative Divisions	2011	2016
Masumiyeh RD	5,859	5,697
Moshkabad RD	6,762	6,449
Karchan (city)	3,752	3,743
Total	16,373	15,889
RD = Rural District
