= Central District (Arak County) =

District in Markazi province, Iran

Central District (Arak County) Persian: بخش مرکزی شهرستان اراک
- District
- Location within Iran
- Coordinates: 34°05′N 49°48′E
- Country: Iran
- Province: Markazi
- County: Arak
- Capital: Arak

Population (2016)
  - Total: 565,357
- Time zone: UTC+3:30 (IRST)

The Central District of Arak County (Persian: بخش مرکزی شهرستان اراک) is in Markazi province, Iran. Its capital is the city of Arak.

== History ==
In 2011, Masumiyeh and Moshkabad Rural Districts were separated from the district in the formation of Masumiyeh District, and the village of Karchan was converted to a city. Saruq Rural District was also separated from the district to form Saruq District and Hajjiabad Rural District was created in the Central District. The cities of Karahrud and Senjan were annexed by the city of Arak in 2013.

== Demographics ==
=== Population ===
At the time of the 2006 National Census, the Central District's population was 543,859 in 150,880 households. The following census in 2011 counted 571,933 people in 174,305 households. The 2016 census measured the population of the district as 565,357 inhabitants in 179,582 households.

=== Administrative divisions ===
Central District (Arak County) Population
| Administrative Divisions | 2006 | 2011 | 2016 |
|---|---|---|---|
| Amanabad RD | 4,682 | 4,205 | 4,108 |
| Amiriyeh RD | 7,532 | 8,664 | 7,379 |
| Davudabad RD | 3,039 | 2,522 | 2,748 |
| Hajjiabad RD | | 5,127 | 4,699 |
| Mashhad-e Miqan RD | 8,830 | 5,444 | 6,963 |
| Masumiyeh RD (Note: Transferred to Masumiyeh District) | 11,453 | | |
| Moshkabad RD | 7,339 | | |
| Saruq RD (Note: Transferred to Saruq District) | 8,410 | | |
| Sedeh RD | 8,724 | 8,966 | 8,103 |
| Shamsabad RD | 6,004 | 5,571 | 4,922 |
| Arak (city) | 438,338 | 484,212 | 520,944 |
| Davudabad (city) | 5,517 | 5,252 | 5,491 |
| Karahrud (city) (Note: Annexed by the city of Arak) | 23,399 | 29,721 | |
| Senjan (city) | 10,592 | 12,249 | |
| Total | 543,859 | 571,933 | 565,357 |
RD = Rural District
