= Arak County =

County in Markazi Province, Iran

Arak County Persian: شهرستان اراک
- County
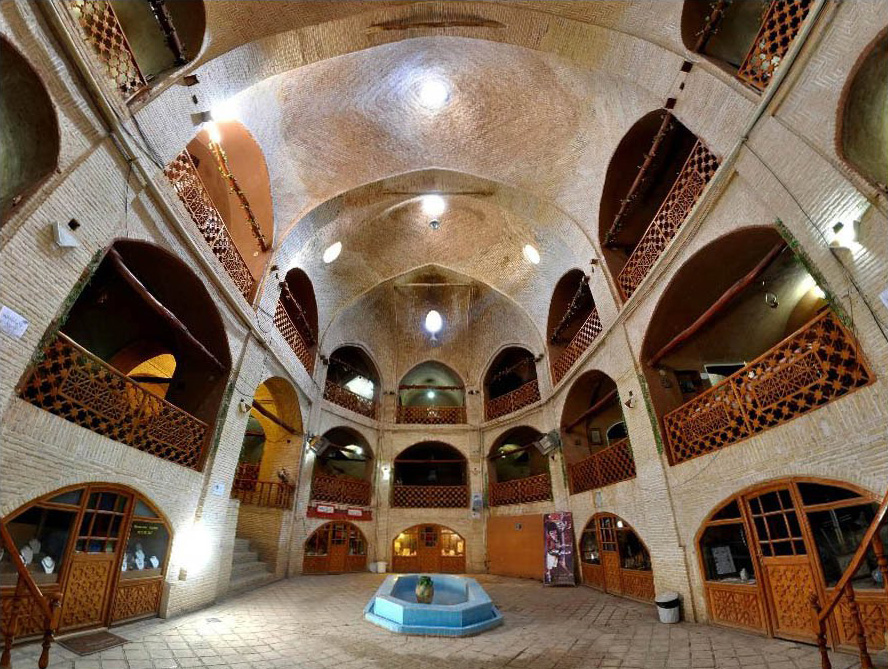
- Bazaar of Arak

- Location of Arak County in Markazi province (bottom center, green)

- Location of Markazi province in Iran
- Coordinates: 34°09′N 49°51′E
- Country: Iran
- Province: Markazi
- Capital: Arak
- Districts: Central, Masumiyeh, Saruq

Population (2016)
  - Total: 591,756
- Time zone: UTC+3:30 (IRST)

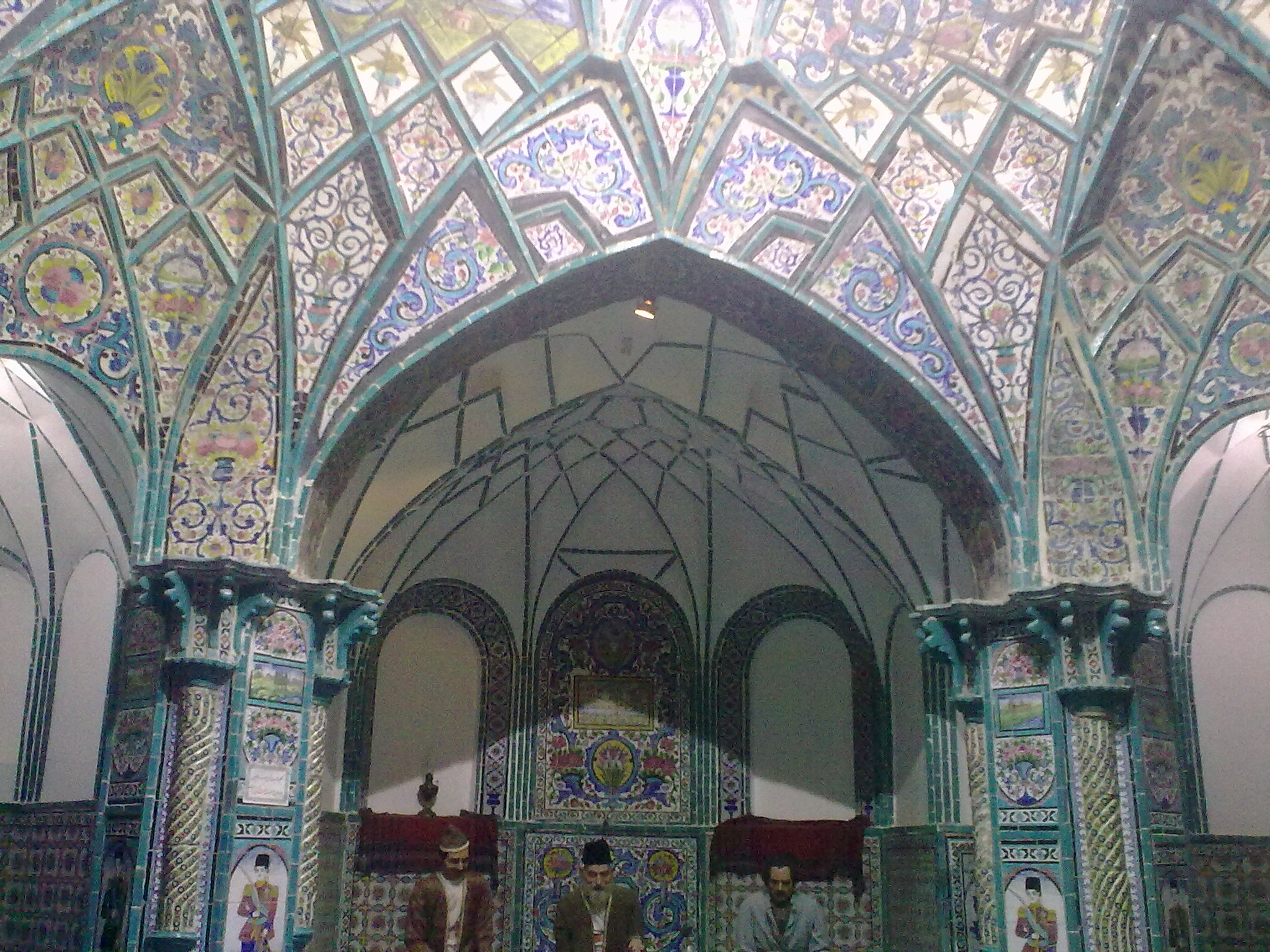
Four Seasons Bathhouse

Arak County (Persian: شهرستان اراک) is in Markazi province, Iran. Its capital is the city of Arak.

== History ==
In 2007, Khondab District was separated from the county in the establishment of Khondab County. The village of Saruq was converted to a city in 2009.

In 2011, Masumiyeh and Moshkabad Rural Districts were separated from the Central District in the formation of Masumiyeh District, and the village of Karchan was converted to a city. Saruq Rural District was also separated from the Central District to form Saruq District, including the new Mashhad ol Kubeh Rural District. Hajjiabad Rural District was created in the Central District.

The cities of Karahrud and Senjan were annexed by the city of Arak in 2013.

== Demographics ==
=== Population ===
At the time of the 2006 National Census, the county's population was 602,971 in 165,955 households. The following census in 2011 counted 599,634 people in 182,749 households. The 2016 census measured the population of the county as 591,756 in 188,180 households.

=== Administrative divisions ===
Arak County's population history and administrative structure over three consecutive censuses are shown in the following table.

Arak County Population
Administrative Divisions	2006	2011	2016
Central District	543,859	571,933	565,357
Amanabad RD	4,682	4,205	4,108
Amiriyeh RD	7,532	8,664	7,379
Davudabad RD	3,039	2,522	2,748
Hajjiabad RD		5,127	4,699
Mashhad-e Miqan RD	8,830	5,444	6,963
Masumiyeh RD	11,453		
Moshkabad RD	7,339		
Saruq RD	8,410		
Sedeh RD	8,724	8,966	8,103
Shamsabad RD	6,004	5,571	4,922
Arak (city)	438,338	484,212	520,944
Davudabad (city)	5,517	5,252	5,491
Karahrud (city) (Note: Annexed by the city of Arak)	23,399	29,721	
Senjan (city)	10,592	12,249	
Khondab District (Note: Transferred to Khondab County)	59,112		
Deh Chal RD	9,583		
Enaj RD	11,706		
Javersiyan RD	13,045		
Khondab RD	9,127		
Sang Sefid RD	8,669		
Khondab (city)	6,982		
Masumiyeh District		16,373	15,889
Masumiyeh RD		5,859	5,697
Moshkabad RD		6,762	6,449
Karchan (city)		3,752	3,743
Saruq District		11,328	10,491
Mashhad ol Kubeh RD		3,264	2,980
Saruq RD		6,678	6,166
Saruq (city)		1,386	1,345
Total	602,971	599,634	591,756
RD = Rural District

== See also ==
Media related to Arak County at Wikimedia Commons
