= Gol-e Zard =

Gol-e Zard or Gol Zard or Gul-i-Zard (Persian: گل زرد) may refer to several places in Iran:

== Hamadan Province ==
- Gol-e Zard, Hamadan, a village in Tuyserkan County

== Khuzestan Province ==
- Gol-e Zard-e Veysi, a village in Behbahan County

== Lorestan Province ==
- Gol-e Zard, Aligudarz, a village in Aligudarz County
- Gol Zard, Borujerd, a village in Borujerd County
- Gol Zard, alternate name of Tazehabad Bahram, a village in Delfan County
- Gol Zard, Khorramabad, a village in Khorramabad County
- Gol Zard-e Bala, a village in Kuhdasht County
- Gol Zard-e Pain, a village in Kuhdasht County
- Gol Zard, Selseleh, a village in Selseleh County

== Markazi Province ==
- Gol-e Zard, alternate name of Sang-e Sefid, Markazi, a village in Shazand County
- Gol Zard-e Malmir, a village in Shazand County
- Gol-e Zard-e Abdi, a village in Shazand County
- Gol-e Zard-e Qaleh, a village in Shazand County
