= Zangeneh =

Zangeneh or Zanganeh (Persian: زنگنه) may refer to various places in Iran:

- Zangeneh, Fasa, Fars Province
- Zanganeh, Lamerd, Fars Province
- Zanganeh, Shiraz, Fars Province
- Zangeneh, Hamadan, a city
- Zangeneh-ye Sofla, a village in Hamadan Province
- Zanganeh, Kermanshah
- Zangeneh, Eslamabad-e Gharb, Kermanshah Province
- Zanganeh, North Khorasan, a village in Maneh and Samalqan County, North Khorasan Province, Iran
- Zanganeh, West Azerbaijan

== See also ==
- Zangeneh (surname)
- Zanganeh (disambiguation)
