= Baneh, Markazi =

Village in Markazi province, Iran

Baneh Persian: بانه
- Village
- Location within Iran
- Coordinates: 34°05′05″N 49°24′40″E
- Country: Iran
- Province: Markazi
- County: Shazand
- District: Mahajeran
- Rural District: Mahajeran

Population (2016)
  - Total: 37
- Time zone: UTC+3:30 (IRST)

Baneh (Persian: بانه) (Note: Also romanized as Bāneh and Boneh) is a village in Mahajeran Rural District of Mahajeran District in Shazand County, (Note: Formerly Sarband County) Markazi province, Iran.

== Demographics ==
=== Population ===
At the time of the 2006 National Census, the village's population was 68 in 18 households, when it was in Pol-e Doab Rural District of Zalian District. The following census in 2011 counted 16 people in five households. The 2016 census measured the population of the village as 37 people in 12 households.

In 2024, the city of Mahajeran and 17 villages were separated from Zalian District in the formation of Mahajeran District. Baneh was transferred to Mahajeran Rural District created in the new district.
