= Mehdiabad, Shazand =

Village in Markazi province, Iran

Mehdiabad Persian: مهدي اباد
- Village
- Location within Iran
- Coordinates: 34°02′53″N 49°20′52″E
- Country: Iran
- Province: Markazi
- County: Shazand
- District: Mahajeran
- Rural District: Khosbijan

Population (2016)
  - Total: 216
- Time zone: UTC+3:30 (IRST)

Mehdiabad (Persian: مهدي اباد) (Note: Also romanized as Mahdīābād and Mehdīābād) is a village in Khosbijan Rural District of Mahajeran District in Shazand County, (Note: Formerly Sarband County) Markazi province, Iran.

== Demographics ==
=== Population ===
At the time of the 2006 National Census, the village's population was 269 in 54 households, when it was in Pol-e Doab Rural District of Zalian District. The following census in 2011 counted 260 people in 71 households. The 2016 census measured the population of the village as 216 people in 65 households.

In 2024, the city of Mahajeran and 17 villages were separated from Zalian District in the formation of Mahajeran District. Mehdiabad was transferred to Khosbijan Rural District created in the new district.
