= Mahajeran (disambiguation) =

Mahajeran or Mohajeran is a city in Hamadan Province, Iran.

Mahajeran or Mohajeran (Persian: مهاجران) may also refer to these places on Iran:

- Mahajeran, Markazi
- Mahajeran-e Abu ol Hasan
- Mahajeran-e Kamar
- Mahajeran-e Khak
- Mohajeran Rural District, in Hamadan Province

== See also ==
- Muhajir (disambiguation)
