= Jazanaq =

Village in Markazi province, Iran

Jazanaq Persian: جزنق
- Village
- Location within Iran
- Coordinates: 34°04′36″N 49°21′10″E
- Country: Iran
- Province: Markazi
- County: Shazand
- District: Mahajeran
- Rural District: Khosbijan

Population (2016)
  - Total: 276
- Time zone: UTC+3:30 (IRST)

Jazanaq (Persian: جزنق) (Note: Also known as Jaznāq) is a village in Khosbijan Rural District of Mahajeran District in Shazand County, (Note: Formerly Sarband County) Markazi province, Iran.

== Demographics ==
=== Population ===
At the time of the 2006 National Census, the village's population was 405 in 122 households, when it was in Pol-e Doab Rural District of Zalian District. The following census in 2011 counted 300 people in 99 households. The 2016 census measured the population of the village as 276 people in 102 households.

In 2024, the city of Mahajeran and 17 villages were separated from Zalian District in the formation of Mahajeran District. Jazanaq was transferred to Khosbijan Rural District created in the new district.
