= Hasanabad, Mahajeran =

Village in Markazi province, Iran

Hasanabad Persian: حسن اباد
- Village
- Country: Iran
- Province: Markazi
- County: Shazand
- District: Mahajeran
- Rural District: Mahajeran

Population (2016)
  - Total: 302
- Time zone: UTC+3:30 (IRST)

Hasanabad (Persian: حسن اباد) (Note: Also romanized as Ḩasanābād) is a village in Mahajeran Rural District of Mahajeran District in Shazand County, (Note: Formerly Sarband County) Markazi province, Iran.

== Demographics ==
=== Population ===
At the time of the 2006 National Census, the village's population was 302 in 87 households, when it was in Pol-e Doab Rural District of Zalian District. The following census in 2011 counted 324 people in 96 households. The 2016 census measured the population of the village as 302 people in 87 households.

In 2024, the city of Mahajeran and 17 villages were separated from Zalian District in the formation of Mahajeran District. Hasanabad was transferred to Mahajeran Rural District created in the new district.
