= Kishan, Iran =

Village in Markazi province, Iran

Kishan Persian: كيشان
- Village
- Location within Iran
- Coordinates: 34°09′40″N 49°27′19″E
- Country: Iran
- Province: Markazi
- County: Shazand
- District: Mahajeran
- Rural District: Khosbijan

Population (2016)
  - Total: 209
- Time zone: UTC+3:30 (IRST)

Kishan (Persian: كيشان) (Note: Also romanized as Kīshān) is a village in Khosbijan Rural District of Mahajeran District in Shazand County, (Note: Formerly Sarband County) Markazi province, Iran.

== Demographics ==
=== Population ===
At the time of the 2006 National Census, the village's population was 326 in 94 households, when it was in Pol-e Doab Rural District of Zalian District. The following census in 2011 counted 266 people in 82 households. The 2016 census measured the population of the village as 209 people in 79 households.

In 2024, the city of Mahajeran and 17 villages were separated from Zalian District in the formation of Mahajeran District. Kishan was transferred to Khosbijan Rural District created in the new district.
