= Homrian =

Village in Markazi province, Iran

Homrian Persian: حمريان
- Village
- Location within Iran
- Coordinates: 34°00′57″N 49°23′19″E
- Country: Iran
- Province: Markazi
- County: Shazand
- District: Mahajeran
- Rural District: Mahajeran

Population (2016)
  - Total: 59
- Time zone: UTC+3:30 (IRST)

Homrian (Persian: حمريان) (Note: Also romanized as Ḩomreyān and Ḩomrīān; also known as Hamziyan) is a village in Mahajeran Rural District of Mahajeran District in Shazand County, (Note: Formerly Sarband County) Markazi province, Iran.

== Demographics ==
=== Population ===
At the time of the 2006 National Census, the village's population was 92 in 26 households, when it was in Pol-e Doab Rural District of Zalian District. The following census in 2011 counted 78 people in 25 households. The 2016 census measured the population of the village as 59 people in 18 households.

In 2024, the city of Mahajeran and 17 villages were separated from Zalian District in the formation of Mahajeran District. Homrian was transferred to Mahajeran Rural District created in the new district.
