= Hoseynabad, Mahajeran =

Village in Markazi province, Iran

Hoseynabad Persian: حسين اباد
- Village
- Location within Iran
- Coordinates: 34°03′19″N 49°20′42″E
- Country: Iran
- Province: Markazi
- County: Shazand
- District: Mahajeran
- Rural District: Khosbijan

Population (2016)
  - Total: 106
- Time zone: UTC+3:30 (IRST)

Hoseynabad (Persian: حسين اباد) (Note: Also romanized as Ḩoseynābād; also known as Husainābād and Hussinabad) is a village in Khosbijan Rural District of Mahajeran District in Shazand County, (Note: Formerly Sarband County) Markazi province, Iran.

== Demographics ==
=== Population ===
At the time of the 2006 National Census, the village's population was 93 in 29 households, when it was in Pol-e Doab Rural District of Zalian District. The following census in 2011 counted 127 people in 37 households. The 2016 census measured the population of the village as 106 people in 31 households.

In 2024, the city of Mahajeran and 17 villages were separated from Zalian District in the formation of Mahajeran District. Hoseynabad was transferred to Khosbijan Rural District created in the new district.
