= Kolahduz =

Village in Markazi province, Iran

Kolahduz Persian: كلاهدوز
- Village
- Location within Iran
- Coordinates: 34°06′50″N 49°24′51″E
- Country: Iran
- Province: Markazi
- County: Shazand
- District: Mahajeran
- Rural District: Khosbijan

Population (2016)
  - Total: 463
- Time zone: UTC+3:30 (IRST)

Kolahduz (Persian: كلاهدوز) (Note: Also romanized as Kolāhdūz and Koleh Dūz; also known as Kolāb Dūz) is a village in Khosbijan Rural District of Mahajeran District in Shazand County, (Note: Formerly Sarband County) Markazi province, Iran.

== Demographics ==
=== Population ===
At the time of the 2006 National Census, the village's population was 417 in 104 households, when it was in Pol-e Doab Rural District of Zalian District. The following census in 2011 counted 464 people in 129 households. The 2016 census measured the population of the village as 463 people in 140 households.

In 2024, the city of Mahajeran and 17 villages were separated from Zalian District in the formation of Mahajeran District. Kolahduz was transferred to Khosbijan Rural District created in the new district.
