= Taht-e Mahall =

Village in Markazi province, Iran

Taht-e Mahall Persian: تحتمحل
- Village
- Location within Iran
- Coordinates: 34°01′42″N 49°21′18″E
- Country: Iran
- Province: Markazi
- County: Shazand
- District: Mahajeran
- Rural District: Mahajeran

Population (2016)
  - Total: 740
- Time zone: UTC+3:30 (IRST)

Taht-e Mahall (Persian: تحتمحل) (Note: Also romanized as Taḩt-e Maḩal, Taḩt-e Maḩall, Taḩtmaḩall, and Tehtmahal; also known as Takht Mahal and Takht-e Maḩall) is a village in, and the capital of, Mahajeran Rural District in Mahajeran District of Shazand County, (Note: Formerly Sarband County) Markazi province, Iran.

== Demographics ==
=== Population ===
At the time of the 2006 National Census, the village's population was 801 in 213 households, when it was in Pol-e Doab Rural District of Zalian District. The following census in 2011 counted 808 people in 251 households. The 2016 census measured the population of the village as 740 people in 240 households.

In 2024, the city of Mahajeran and 17 villages were separated from Zalian District in the formation of Mahajeran District. Taht-e Mahall was transferred to Mahajeran Rural District created in the new district.
