= Khosbijan =

Village in Markazi province, Iran

Khosbijan Persian: خسبيجان
- Village
- Location within Iran
- Coordinates: 34°07′20″N 49°22′32″E
- Country: Iran
- Province: Markazi
- County: Shazand
- District: Mahajeran
- Rural District: Khosbijan

Population (2016)
  - Total: 475
- Time zone: UTC+3:30 (IRST)

Khosbijan (Persian: خسبيجان) (Note: Also romanized as Khosbījān; also known as Ḩosbījān-e Soflá and Khushbījān) is a village in, and the capital of, Khosbijan Rural District in Mahajeran District of Shazand County, (Note: Formerly Sarband County) Markazi province, Iran.

== Demographics ==
=== Population ===
At the time of the 2006 National Census, the village's population was 543 in 147 households, when it was in Pol-e Doab Rural District of Zalian District. The following census in 2011 counted 499 people in 161 households. The 2016 census measured the population of the village as 475 people in 164 households.

In 2024, the city of Mahajeran and 17 villages were separated from Zalian District in the formation of Mahajeran District. Khosbijan was transferred to Khosbijan Rural District created in the new district.
