= Kamazan Rural District =

Kamazan Rural District (Persian: دهستان كمازان) may refer to:

- Kamazan-e Olya Rural District
- Kamazan-e Sofla Rural District
- Kamazan-e Vosta Rural District
