= Bayatan =

Bayatan or Beyatan or Biatan (Persian: بياتان), also rendered as Bayatun or Beyatun or Biatun or Biyatun, may refer to:

- Biatan-e Olya, a village in Hamadan Province, Iran
- Biatan-e Sofla, a village in Hamadan Province, Iran
- Bayatan, Borujerd, a village in Borujerd County, Lorestan Province, Iran
- Bayatan, Dorud, a village in Dorud County, Lorestan Province, Iran
- Bayatan, Markazi, a village in Markazi Province, Iran
