= Mahajeran-e Abu ol Hasan =

Village in Markazi province, Iran

Mahajeran-e Abu ol Hasan Persian: مهاجران ابوالحسن
- Village
- Location within Iran
- Coordinates: 34°00′59″N 49°23′33″E
- Country: Iran
- Province: Markazi
- County: Shazand
- District: Mahajeran
- Rural District: Mahajeran

Population (2016)
  - Total: 0
- Time zone: UTC+3:30 (IRST)

Mahajeran-e Abu ol Hasan (Persian: مهاجران ابوالحسن) (Note: Also romanized as Mahājerān-e Abū ol Ḩasan; also known as Mahajaran Molla Abolhasan, Mahājerān-e Mollā Abol Ḩasan, Mahājerān-e Mollā Abū ol Ḩasan, Mahājerān-e Mollā Ḩasan, Mohājerān-e Mollā Abū ol Ḩasanī, and Mohājerān-e Mollā Ḩasan) is a village in Mahajeran Rural District of Mahajeran District in Shazand County, (Note: Formerly Sarband County) Markazi province, Iran.

== Demographics ==
=== Population ===
At the time of the 2006 National Census, the village's population was 27 in seven households, when it was in Pol-e Doab Rural District of Zalian District. The following census in 2011 counted a population below the reporting threshold. The 2016 census measured the population of the village as zero.

In 2024, the city of Mahajeran and 17 villages were separated from Zalian District in the formation of Mahajeran District. Mahajeran-e Abu ol Hasan was transferred to Mahajeran Rural District created in the new district.
