= Mahajeran-e Khak =

Village in Markazi province, Iran

Mahajeran-e Khak Persian: مهاجران خاك
- Village
- Location within Iran
- Coordinates: 34°00′58″N 49°24′35″E
- Country: Iran
- Province: Markazi
- County: Shazand
- District: Mahajeran
- Rural District: Mahajeran

Population (2016)
  - Total: 113
- Time zone: UTC+3:30 (IRST)

Mahajeran-e Khak (Persian: مهاجران خاك) (Note: Also romanized as Mahajaran Khak, Mahājerān-e Khāk, and Mohājerān-e Khāk) is a village in Mahajeran Rural District of Mahajeran District in Shazand County, (Note: Formerly Sarband County) Markazi province, Iran.

== Demographics ==
=== Population ===
At the time of the 2006 National Census, the village's population was 210 in 61 households, when it was in Pol-e Doab Rural District of Zalian District. The following census in 2011 counted 156 people in 58 households. The 2016 census measured the population of the village as 113 people in 38 households.

In 2024, the city of Mahajeran and 17 villages were separated from Zalian District in the formation of Mahajeran District. Mahajeran-e Khak was transferred to Mahajeran Rural District created in the new district.
