= Mahajeran-e Kamar =

Village in Markazi province, Iran

Mahajeran-e Kamar Persian: مهاجران كمر
- Village
- Location within Iran
- Coordinates: 34°01′04″N 49°24′07″E
- Country: Iran
- Province: Markazi
- County: Shazand
- District: Mahajeran
- Rural District: Mahajeran

Population (2016)
  - Total: 102
- Time zone: UTC+3:30 (IRST)

Mahajeran-e Kamar (Persian: مهاجران كمر) (Note: Also romanized as Mahajaran Kamar, Mahājerān-e Kamar, and Mohājerān-e Kamar) is a village in Mahajeran Rural District of Mahajeran District in Shazand County, (Note: Formerly Sarband County) Markazi province, Iran.

== Demographics ==
=== Population ===
At the time of the 2006 National Census, the village's population was 160 in 45 households, when it was in Pol-e Doab Rural District of Zalian District. The following census in 2011 counted 139 people in 51 households. The 2016 census measured the population of the village as 102 people in 35 households.

In 2024, the city of Mahajeran and 17 villages were separated from Zalian District in the formation of Mahajeran District. Mahajeran-e Kamar was transferred to Mahajeran Rural District created in the new district.
