= Bid Korpeh =

Bid Korpeh or Bidkorpeh (Persian: بيدكرپه), also rendered as Bidkarih, may refer to:

- Bid Korpeh-ye Olya
- Bid Korpeh-ye Sofla
- Bid Korpeh-ye Vosta
