= Mahajeran Rural District =

Rural district in Markazi province, Iran

Mahajeran Rural District Persian: دهستان مهاجران
- Rural District
- Location within Iran
- Coordinates: 34°03′N 49°26′E
- Country: Iran
- Province: Markazi
- County: Shazand
- District: Mahajeran
- Established: 2024
- Capital: Taht-e Mahall
- Time zone: UTC+3:30 (IRST)

Mahajeran Rural District (Persian: دهستان مهاجران) is in Mahajeran District of Shazand County, (Note: Formerly Sarband County) Markazi province, Iran. Its capital is the village of Taht-e Mahall, whose population at the time of the 2016 National Census was 740 people in 240 households.

== History ==
In 2024, the city of Mahajeran and 17 villages were separated from Zalian District in the formation of Mahajeran District, and Mahajeran Rural District was created in the new district.

== Other villages in the rural district ==
- Baneh
- Hasanabad
- Homrian
- Mahajeran-e Abu ol Hasan
- Mahajeran-e Kamar
- Mahajeran-e Khak
