= Sarchal =

Sarchal or Sar Chal (Persian: سرچال) may refer to:

- Sar Chal, Kohgiluyeh and Boyer-Ahmad
- Sar Chal, Markazi
