= Hamzehlu (disambiguation) =

Hamzehlu is a village in Zanjan Province, Iran.

Hamzehlu (Persian: حمزه لو) may also refer to:

- Hamzehlu-ye Olya, Hamadan Province
- Hamzehlu-ye Sofla, Hamadan Province
- Hamzehlu Rural District, in Markazi Province
