= Savarabad =

Savarabad or Surabad (Persian: سواراباد or صوراباد) may refer to:

- Surabad, Isfahan
- Savarabad, Khuzestan
- Savarabad, Markazi
- Savarabad-e Olya, Markazi Province
- Savarabad-e Sofla, Markazi Province
- Surabad, Zanjan
