= Taleh Jerd (disambiguation) =

Taleh Jerd is a village in Zanjan Province, Iran.

Taleh Jerd or Telehjerd or Talah Jerd or Talehjerd or Talegerd (Persian: تله جرد) may also refer to:

- Taleh Jerd-e Olya, Hamadan Province
- Taleh Jerd-e Sofla, Hamadan Province
