= Arges, Iran =

Arges (Persian: ارگس), in Iran, may refer to:

- Arges-e Olya
- Arges-e Sofla
