= Khosbijan Rural District =

Rural district in Markazi province, Iran

Khosbijan Rural District Persian: دهستان خسبیجان
- Rural District
- Location within Iran
- Coordinates: 34°07′N 49°22′E
- Country: Iran
- Province: Markazi
- County: Shazand
- District: Mahajeran
- Established: 2024
- Capital: Khosbijan
- Time zone: UTC+3:30 (IRST)

Khosbijan Rural District (Persian: دهستان خسبیجان) is in Mahajeran District of Shazand County, (Note: Formerly Sarband County) Markazi province, Iran. Its capital is the village of Khosbijan, whose population at the time of the 2016 National Census was 475 people in 164 households.

== History ==
In 2024, the city of Mahajeran and 17 villages were separated from Zalian District in the formation of Mahajeran District, and Khosbijan Rural District was created in the new district.

== Other villages in the rural district ==
- Hoseynabad
- Jazanaq
- Kishan
- Kolahduz
- Mehdiabad
