= Darreh Mianeh =

Darreh Mianeh or Darreh Meyaneh or Darreh Miyaneh (Persian: دره ميانه) may refer to:

- Darreh Mianeh-ye Olya
- Darreh Mianeh-ye Sofla
