= Alarj =

Village in Markazi province, Iran

Alarj Persian: الرج
- Village
- Location within Iran
- Coordinates: 34°07′07″N 49°19′01″E
- Country: Iran
- Province: Markazi
- County: Shazand
- District: Zalian
- Rural District: Pol-e Doab

Population (2016)
  - Total: 521
- Time zone: UTC+3:30 (IRST)

Alarj (Persian: الرج) (Note: Also romanized as Alraj; also known as Alborj) is a village in Pol-e Doab Rural District of Zalian District in Shazand County, (Note: Formerly Sarband County) Markazi province, Iran.

== Demographics ==
=== Population ===
At the time of the 2006 National Census, the village's population was 570 in 122 households. The following census in 2011 counted 591 people in 169 households. The 2016 census measured the population of the village as 521 people in 175 households.
