= Tayemeh =

Tayemeh or Taimeh or Taemeh (Persian: طايمه) may refer to:

- Tayemeh, Malayer
- Tayemeh, Nahavand
