= Malian, Hamadan =

Village in Hamadan province, Iran

Malian Persian: مليان
- Village
- Location within Iran
- Coordinates: 34°06′40″N 48°49′54″E
- Country: Iran
- Province: Hamadan
- County: Malayer
- District: Zand
- Rural District: Kamazan-e Sofla

Population (2016)
  - Total: 118
- Time zone: UTC+3:30 (IRST)

Malian (Persian: مليان) (Note: Also romanized as Malīān, Malīyān, Malyān, and Melyan) is a village in Kamazan-e Sofla Rural District of Zand District in Malayer County, Hamadan province, Iran.

== Demographics ==
=== Population ===
At the time of the 2006 National Census, the village's population was 125 in 30 households. The following census in 2011 counted 137 people in 43 households. The 2016 census measured the population of the village as 118 people in 42 households.
