= Deh Mianeh =

Village in Hamadan province, Iran

Deh Mianeh Persian: ده ميانه
- Village
- Location within Iran
- Coordinates: 34°10′27″N 49°02′56″E
- Country: Iran
- Province: Hamadan
- County: Malayer
- District: Zand
- Rural District: Kamazan-e Olya

Population (2016)
  - Total: 110
- Time zone: UTC+3:30 (IRST)

Deh Mianeh (Persian: ده ميانه) (Note: Also romanized as Deh Mīāneh and Deh Meyāneh) is a village in Kamazan-e Olya Rural District of Zand District in Malayer County, Hamadan province, Iran.

== Demographics ==
=== Population ===
At the time of the 2006 National Census, the village's population was 116 in 35 households. The following census in 2011 counted 115 people in 42 households. The 2016 census measured the population of the village as 110 people in 45 households.
