= Masalhan =

Village in Hamadan province, Iran

Masalhan Persian: مصلحان
- Village
- Location within Iran
- Coordinates: 34°09′17″N 48°51′49″E
- Country: Iran
- Province: Hamadan
- County: Malayer
- District: Zand
- Rural District: Kamazan-e Sofla

Population (2016)
  - Total: 465
- Time zone: UTC+3:30 (IRST)

Masalhan (Persian: مصلحان) (Note: Also romanized as Maṣalḥān; also known as Qal‘eh, Qal‘eh Khalīfeh (قلعه خليفه), and Qal‘eh-ye Khalīfeh) is a village in Kamazan-e Sofla Rural District of Zand District in Malayer County, Hamadan province, Iran.

== Demographics ==
=== Population ===
At the time of the 2006 National Census, the village's population was 609 in 162 households. The following census in 2011 counted 514 people in 161 households. The 2016 census measured the population of the village as 465 people in 158 households.
