= Mian Rud, Markazi =

Village in Markazi province, Iran

Mian Rud Persian: ميان رود
- Village
- Location within Iran
- Coordinates: 34°09′31″N 49°10′06″E
- Country: Iran
- Province: Markazi
- County: Shazand
- District: Zalian
- Rural District: Pol-e Doab

Population (2016)
  - Total: 125
- Time zone: UTC+3:30 (IRST)

Mian Rud (Persian: ميان رود) (Note: Also romanized as Mīān Rūd and Mīyān Rūd; also known as Meyārūd) is a village in Pol-e Doab Rural District of Zalian District in Shazand County, (Note: Formerly Sarband County) Markazi province, Iran.

== Demographics ==
=== Population ===
At the time of the 2006 National Census, the village's population was 180 in 43 households. The following census in 2011 counted 154 people in 50 households. The 2016 census measured the population of the village as 125 people in 38 households.
