= Kus Ali =

kusali كوسعلي
- Village
- Location within Iran
- Coordinates: 33°59′27″N 49°12′40″E
- Country: Iran
- Province: Markazi
- County: Shazand
- Bakhsh: Zalian
- Rural District: Nahr-e Mian

Population (2006)
  - Total: 233
- Time zone: UTC+3:30 (IRST)
  - Summer (DST): UTC+4:30 (IRDT)

KusAli (Persian: كوسعلي, also Romanized as KūsAlī; also known as KūsAlī) is a village in Nahr-e Mian Rural District, Zalian District, Shazand County, Markazi Province, Iran. At the 2006 census, its population was 233, in 62 families.
