= Kuseh Ali =

Kuseh Ali (Persian: كوسه علي) may refer to:

- Kus Ali
- Kalleh-ye Nahr Mian
