= Kolah Chub =

Village in Markazi province, Iran

Kolah Chub Persian: كله چوب
- Village
- Location within Iran
- Coordinates: 33°54′35″N 49°00′39″E
- Country: Iran
- Province: Markazi
- County: Shazand
- District: Zalian
- Rural District: Zalian

Population (2016)
  - Total: 84
- Time zone: UTC+3:30 (IRST)

Kolah Chub (Persian: كله چوب) (Note: Also romanized as Kolah Chūb; also known as Gol Jūb, Kolah Jūb, Kolāh Jūb, Kolājūb, and Koleh Jūb) is a village in Zalian Rural District of Zalian District in Shazand County, (Note: Formerly Sarband County) Markazi province, Iran.

== Demographics ==
=== Population ===
At the time of the 2006 National Census, the village's population was 92 in 24 households. The following census in 2011 counted 101 people in 29 households. The 2016 census measured the population of the village as 84 people in 30 households.
