= Biatan-e Sofla =

Biatan-e Sofla بياتان سفلي
- Village
- Location within Iran
- Coordinates: 34°01′31″N 48°57′29″E
- Country: Iran
- Province: Hamadan
- County: Malayer
- Bakhsh: Zand
- Rural District: Kamazan-e Sofla

Population (2006)
  - Total: 46
- Time zone: UTC+3:30 (IRST)
  - Summer (DST): UTC+4:30 (IRDT)

Biatan-e Sofla (Persian: بياتان سفلي, also Romanized as Bīātān-e Soflá, Bayātān-e Soflá, Bayatan Sofla; also known as Bayātān-e Pā’īn, Beyātān-e Pā’īn, and Bīātān) is a village in Kamazan-e Sofla Rural District, Zand District, Malayer County, Hamadan Province, Iran. At the 2006 census, its population was 46, in 14 families.
