= Nabi Dar =

Village in Markazi province, Iran

Nabi Dar Persian: نبي در
- Village
- Location within Iran
- Coordinates: 34°11′06″N 49°08′54″E
- Country: Iran
- Province: Markazi
- County: Shazand
- District: Zalian
- Rural District: Pol-e Doab

Population (2016)
  - Total: 64
- Time zone: UTC+3:30 (IRST)

Nabi Dar (Persian: نبي در) (Note: Also romanized as Nabī Dar; also known as Bī Dar) is a village in Pol-e Doab Rural District of Zalian District in Shazand County, (Note: Formerly Sarband County) Markazi province, Iran.

== Demographics ==
=== Population ===
At the time of the 2006 National Census, the village's population was 118 in 24 households. The following census in 2011 counted 88 people in 23 households. The 2016 census measured the population of the village as 64 people in 19 households.
