= Besri, Markazi =

Village in Markazi province, Iran

Besri Persian: بصري
- Village
- Location within Iran
- Coordinates: 34°05′31″N 49°14′43″E
- Country: Iran
- Province: Markazi
- County: Shazand
- District: Zalian
- Rural District: Pol-e Doab

Population (2016)
  - Total: 1,135
- Time zone: UTC+3:30 (IRST)

Besri (Persian: بصري) (Note: Also romanized as Başarī, Basri, and Beşrī; also known as Baştī) is a village in Pol-e Doab Rural District of Zalian District in Shazand County, (Note: Formerly Sarband County) Markazi province, Iran.

== Demographics ==
=== Population ===
At the time of the 2006 National Census, the village's population was 1,034 in 311 households. The following census in 2011 counted 1,119 people in 344 households. The 2016 census measured the population of the village as 1,135 people in 370 households.
