= Cheshmeh-ye Ali Mohammad =

Village in Hamadan province, Iran

Cheshmeh-ye Ali Mohammad Persian: چشمه علي محمد
- Village
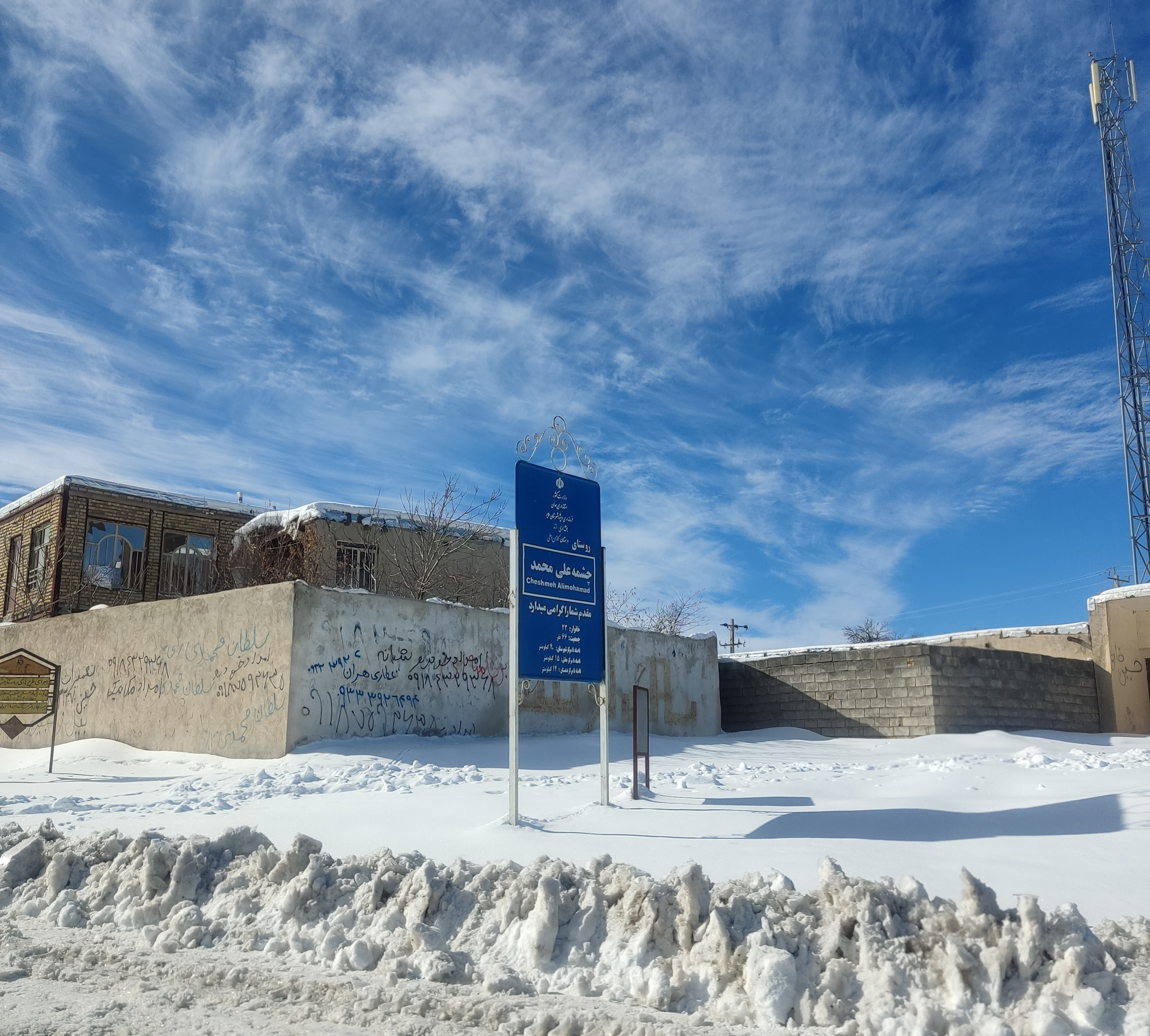
- The village of Cheshmeh-ye Ali Mohammad

- Location within Iran
- Coordinates: 34°03′38″N 49°07′02″E
- Country: Iran
- Province: Hamadan
- County: Malayer
- District: Zand
- Rural District: Kamazan-e Vosta

Population (2016)
  - Total: 66
- Time zone: UTC+3:30 (IRST)

Cheshmeh-ye Ali Mohammad (Persian: چشمه علي محمد) (Note: Also romanized as Cheshmeh Ali Mohammad and Cheshmeh-ye 'Alī Moḩammad; also known as Chasmeh-ye 'Alī Moḩammad, Cheshmeh-ye 'Aī Moḩammad, and Cheshmeh-ye 'Alishāh) is a village in Kamazan-e Vosta Rural District of Zand District in Malayer County, Hamadan province, Iran.

== Demographics ==
=== Population ===
At the time of the 2006 National Census, the village's population was 89 in 25 households. The following census in 2011 counted 83 people in 24 households. The 2016 census measured the population of the village as 66 people in 23 households.
