= Golparabad =

Village in Hamadan province, Iran

Golparabad Persian: گلپراباد
- Village
- Location within Iran
- Coordinates: 34°09′16″N 49°03′24″E
- Country: Iran
- Province: Hamadan
- County: Malayer
- District: Zand
- Rural District: Kamazan-e Olya

Population (2016)
  - Total: 311
- Time zone: UTC+3:30 (IRST)

Golparabad (Persian: گلپراباد) (Note: Also romanized as Golparābād; also known as Goldarābād) is a village in Kamazan-e Olya Rural District of Zand District in Malayer County, Hamadan province, Iran.

== Demographics ==
=== Population ===
At the time of the 2006 National Census, the village's population was 534 in 105 households. The following census in 2011 counted 399 people in 107 households. The 2016 census measured the population of the village as 311 people in 99 households.
