= Far, Iran =

Village in Markazi province, Iran

Far Persian: فر
- Village
- Location within Iran
- Coordinates: 34°02′42″N 49°18′57″E
- Country: Iran
- Province: Markazi
- County: Shazand
- District: Zalian
- Rural District: Pol-e Doab

Population (2016)
  - Total: 783
- Time zone: UTC+3:30 (IRST)

Far (Persian: فر) is a village in Pol-e Doab Rural District of Zalian District in Shazand County, (Note: Formerly Sarband County) Markazi province, Iran.

== Demographics ==
=== Population ===
At the time of the 2006 National Census, the village's population was 1,042 in 296 households. The following census in 2011 counted 970 people in 320 households. The 2016 census measured the population of the village as 783 people in 269 households.
