= Kasavand =

Village in Hamadan province, Iran

Kasavand Persian: كساوند
- Village
- Location within Iran
- Coordinates: 34°09′09″N 48°58′11″E
- Country: Iran
- Province: Hamadan
- County: Malayer
- District: Zand
- Rural District: Kamazan-e Olya

Population (2016)
  - Total: 273
- Time zone: UTC+3:30 (IRST)

Kasavand (Persian: كساوند) (Note: Also romanized as Kasāvand and Kesāvand) is a village in Kamazan-e Olya Rural District of Zand District in Malayer County, Hamadan province, Iran.

== Demographics ==
=== Population ===
At the time of the 2006 National Census, the village's population was 448 in 114 households. The following census in 2011 counted 326 people in 102 households. The 2016 census measured the population of the village as 273 people in 95 households.
