= Qush Tappeh, Markazi =

Village in Markazi province, Iran

Qush Tappeh Persian: قوش تپه
- Village
- Location within Iran
- Coordinates: 34°03′38″N 49°10′07″E
- Country: Iran
- Province: Markazi
- County: Shazand
- District: Zalian
- Rural District: Nahr-e Mian

Population (2016)
  - Total: 426
- Time zone: UTC+3:30 (IRST)

Qush Tappeh (Persian: قوش تپه) (Note: Also romanized as Qūsh Tappeh; also known as Ooch Tappeh, Ūch Tappeh, and Ūch Tappen) is a village in Nahr-e Mian Rural District (Note: Formerly Zalian Rural District) of Zalian District in Shazand County, (Note: Formerly Sarband County) Markazi province, Iran.

== Demographics ==
=== Population ===
At the time of the 2006 National Census, the village's population was 454 in 114 households. The following census in 2011 counted 438 people in 127 households. The 2016 census measured the population of the village as 426 people in 151 households.
