= Deh-e Kaid =

Village in Markazi province, Iran

Deh-e Kaid Persian: ده كاييد
- Village
- Location within Iran
- Coordinates: 33°55′44″N 49°03′04″E
- Country: Iran
- Province: Markazi
- County: Shazand
- District: Zalian
- Rural District: Zalian

Population (2016)
  - Total: 213
- Time zone: UTC+3:30 (IRST)

Deh-e Kaid (Persian: ده كاييد) (Note: Also romanized as Deh-e Kā’īd; also known as Deh Qā‘īd, Deh-e Qā’īd, and Deh-e Qāyed) is a village in, and the capital of, Zalian Rural District in Zalian District of Shazand County, (Note: Formerly Sarband County) Markazi province, Iran.

== Demographics ==
=== Population ===
At the time of the 2006 National Census, the village's population was 340 in 87 households. The following census in 2011 counted 259 people in 88 households. The 2016 census measured the population of the village as 213 people in 83 households.
