= Mishen =

Village in Hamadan province, Iran

Mishen Persian: ميشن
- Village
- Location within Iran
- Coordinates: 34°09′26″N 48°55′36″E
- Country: Iran
- Province: Hamadan
- County: Malayer
- District: Zand
- Rural District: Kamazan-e Olya

Population (2016)
  - Total: 831
- Time zone: UTC+3:30 (IRST)

Mishen (Persian: ميشن) (Note: Also romanized as Mīshan and Mīshen; also known as Bīshen, Bīshīn, and Mīshīn) is a village in Kamazan-e Olya Rural District of Zand District in Malayer County, Hamadan province, Iran.

== Demographics ==
=== Population ===
At the time of the 2006 National Census, the village's population was 1,066 in 260 households. The following census in 2011 counted 931 people in 270 households. The 2016 census measured the population of the village as 831 people in 250 households, the most populous in its rural district.
