= Bid Korpeh-ye Vosta =

Bid Korpeh-ye Vosta بيدكرپه وسطي
- Village
- Location within Iran
- Coordinates: 34°01′10″N 48°53′14″E
- Country: Iran
- Province: Hamadan
- County: Malayer
- Bakhsh: Zand
- Rural District: Kamazan-e Sofla

Population (2006)
  - Total: 73
- Time zone: UTC+3:30 (IRST)
  - Summer (DST): UTC+4:30 (IRDT)

Bid Korpeh-ye Vosta (Persian: بيدكرپه وسطي, also Romanized as Bīd Korpeh-ye Vosţá; also known as Bīd Korpeh, Bīdkorpeh-ye Vasaţ, and Birkarih Vosta) is a village in Kamazan-e Sofla Rural District, Zand District, Malayer County, Hamadan Province, Iran. At the 2006 census, its population was 73, in 24 families.
