= Nahandar =

Village in Hamadan province, Iran

Nahandar Persian: نهندر
- Village
- Location within Iran
- Coordinates: 34°08′58″N 48°58′06″E
- Country: Iran
- Province: Hamadan
- County: Malayer
- District: Zand
- Rural District: Kamazan-e Olya

Population (2016)
  - Total: 71
- Time zone: UTC+3:30 (IRST)

Nahandar (Persian: نهندر) (Note: Also romanized as Nehendar and Nohendar) is a village in Kamazan-e Olya Rural District of Zand District in Malayer County, Hamadan province, Iran.

== Demographics ==
=== Population ===
At the time of the 2006 National Census, the village's population was 108 in 32 households. The following census in 2011 counted 83 people in 25 households. The 2016 census measured the population of the village as 71 people in 26 households.
