= Garjai =

Village in Hamadan province, Iran

Garjai Persian: گرجايي
- Village
- Location within Iran
- Coordinates: 34°07′24″N 49°05′14″E
- Country: Iran
- Province: Hamadan
- County: Malayer
- District: Zand
- Rural District: Kamazan-e Vosta

Population (2016)
  - Total: 760
- Time zone: UTC+3:30 (IRST)

Garjai (Persian: گرجايي) (Note: Also romanized as Garjā’ī and Gorjā’ī) is a village in Kamazan-e Vosta Rural District of Zand District in Malayer County, Hamadan province, Iran.

== Demographics ==
=== Population ===
At the time of the 2006 National Census, the village's population was 1,062 in 281 households. The following census in 2011 counted 920 people in 278 households. The 2016 census measured the population of the village as 760 people in 253 households.
