= Jalayer, Shazand =

Village in Markazi province, Iran

Jalayer Persian: جلاير
- Village
- Location within Iran
- Coordinates: 34°00′43″N 49°08′16″E
- Country: Iran
- Province: Markazi
- County: Shazand
- District: Zalian
- Rural District: Nahr-e Mian

Population (2016)
  - Total: 1,304
- Time zone: UTC+3:30 (IRST)

Jalayer (Persian: جلاير) (Note: Also romanized as Jalāyer) is a village in Nahr-e Mian Rural District (Note: Formerly Zalian Rural District) of Zalian District in Shazand County, (Note: Formerly Sarband County) Markazi province, Iran.

== Demographics ==
=== Population ===
At the time of the 2006 National Census, the village's population was 1,359 in 302 households. The following census in 2011 counted 1,310 people in 389 households. The 2016 census measured the population of the village as 1,304 people in 429 households.
