= Bid Korpeh-ye Sofla =

Bid Korpeh-ye Sofla بيدكرپه سفلي
- Village
- Location within Iran
- Coordinates: 34°01′16″N 48°53′30″E
- Country: Iran
- Province: Hamadan
- County: Malayer
- Bakhsh: Zand
- Rural District: Kamazan-e Sofla

Population (2006)
  - Total: 149
- Time zone: UTC+3:30 (IRST)
  - Summer (DST): UTC+4:30 (IRDT)

Bid Korpeh-ye Sofla (Persian: بيدكرپه سفلي, also Romanized as Bīd Korpeh-ye Soflá; also known as Bidkarih Sofla, Bid Korpeh, and Bīdkorpeh-ye Pā’īn) is a village in Kamazan-e Sofla Rural District, Zand District, Malayer County, Hamadan Province, Iran. At the 2006 census, its population was 149, in 34 families.
