= Hesar, Shazand =

Village in Markazi province, Iran

Hesar Persian: حصار
- Village
- Location within Iran
- Coordinates: 34°01′55″N 49°18′30″E
- Country: Iran
- Province: Markazi
- County: Shazand
- District: Zalian
- Rural District: Pol-e Doab

Population (2016)
  - Total: 2,201
- Time zone: UTC+3:30 (IRST)

Hesar (Persian: حصار) (Note: Also romanized as Ḩeşār) is a village in Pol-e Doab Rural District of Zalian District in Shazand County, (Note: Formerly Sarband County) Markazi province, Iran.

== Demographics ==
=== Population ===
At the time of the 2006 National Census, the village's population was 2,725 in 738 households. The following census in 2011 counted 2,649 people in 807 households. The 2016 census measured the population of the village as 2,201 people in 742 households, the most populous in its rural district.
