= Ahmadiyeh, Hamadan =

Village in Hamadan province, Iran

Ahmadiyeh Persian: احمديه
- Village
- Location within Iran
- Coordinates: 34°10′37″N 49°02′03″E
- Country: Iran
- Province: Hamadan
- County: Malayer
- District: Zand
- Rural District: Kamazan-e Olya

Population (2016)
  - Total: 207
- Time zone: UTC+3:30 (IRST)

Ahmadiyeh (Persian: احمديه) (Note: Also romanized as Aḩmadīyeh; also known as Aḩmad Rowghanī (احمدروغني)) is a village in Kamazan-e Olya Rural District of Zand District in Malayer County, Hamadan province, Iran.

== Demographics ==
=== Population ===
At the time of the 2006 National Census, the village's population was 330 in 80 households. The following census in 2011 counted 218 people in 71 households. The 2016 census measured the population of the village as 207 people in 77 households.
