= Peyhan =

Village in Hamadan province, Iran

Peyhan Persian: پيهان
- Village
- Location within Iran
- Coordinates: 34°07′54″N 48°52′00″E
- Country: Iran
- Province: Hamadan
- County: Malayer
- District: Zand
- Rural District: Kamazan-e Sofla

Population (2016)
  - Total: 620
- Time zone: UTC+3:30 (IRST)

Peyhan (Persian: پيهان) (Note: Also romanized as Paihān, Peyhān and Pīhān; also known as Pāhīān, Pahyān, and Pey Mān) is a village in Kamazan-e Sofla Rural District of Zand District in Malayer County, Hamadan province, Iran.

== Demographics ==
=== Population ===
At the time of the 2006 National Census, the village's population was 374 in 103 households. The following census in 2011 counted 304 people in 99 households. The 2016 census measured the population of the village as 201 people in 69 households, the most populous in its rural district.
