= Bid Korpeh-ye Olya =

Bid Korpeh-ye Olya بيدكرپه عليا
- Village
- Location within Iran
- Coordinates: 34°01′19″N 48°52′04″E
- Country: Iran
- Province: Hamadan
- County: Malayer
- Bakhsh: Zand
- Rural District: Kamazan-e Sofla

Population (2006)
  - Total: 163
- Time zone: UTC+3:30 (IRST)
  - Summer (DST): UTC+4:30 (IRDT)

Bid Korpeh-ye Olya (Persian: بيدكرپه عليا, also Romanized as Bīd Korpeh-ye ‘Olyā; also known as Bidkarih Olya, Bīd Korpeh, and Bīdkorpeh-ye Bālā) is a village in Kamazan-e Sofla Rural District, Zand District, Malayer County, Hamadan Province, Iran. At the 2006 census, its population was 163, in 39 families.
