= Nahr-e Mian =

Village in Markazi province, Iran

Nahr-e Mian Persian: نهر ميان
- Village
- Location within Iran
- Coordinates: 33°59′59″N 49°12′30″E
- Country: Iran
- Province: Markazi
- County: Shazand
- District: Zalian
- Rural District: Nahr-e Mian

Population (2016)
  - Total: 1,634
- Time zone: UTC+3:30 (IRST)

Nahr-e Mian (Persian: نهرميان) (Note: Also romanized as Nahr Meyān, Nahr Mīān, Nahr-e Mīān, and Nahrmiyān; also known as Haran) is a village in, and the capital of, Nahr-e Mian Rural District (Note: Formerly Zalian Rural District) in Zalian District of Shazand County, (Note: Formerly Sarband County) Markazi province, Iran.

== Demographics ==
=== Population ===
At the time of the 2006 National Census, the village's population was 1,650 in 424 households. The following census in 2011 counted 1,729 people in 528 households. The 2016 census measured the population of the village as 1,634 people in 519 households, the most populous in its rural district.
