= Qarah Bonyad =

Village in Markazi province, Iran

Qarah Bonyad Persian: قره بنياد
- Village
- Location within Iran
- Coordinates: 34°02′09″N 49°09′22″E
- Country: Iran
- Province: Markazi
- County: Shazand
- District: Zalian
- Rural District: Nahr-e Mian

Population (2016)
  - Total: 565
- Time zone: UTC+3:30 (IRST)

Qarah Bonyad (Persian: قره بنياد) (Note: Also romanized as Qarah Bonyād and Qareh Bonyād; also known as Qal‘eh-ye Bonyād) is a village in Nahr-e Mian Rural District (Note: Formerly Zalian Rural District) of Zalian District in Shazand County, (Note: Formerly Sarband County) Markazi province, Iran.

== Demographics ==
=== Population ===
At the time of the 2006 National Census, the village's population was 761 in 177 households. The following census in 2011 counted 795 people in 218 households. The 2016 census measured the population of the village as 565 people in 191 households.
