= Deh Chaneh =

Village in Hamadan province, Iran

Deh Chaneh Persian: ده چانه
- Village
- Location within Iran
- Coordinates: 34°06′19″N 49°07′13″E
- Country: Iran
- Province: Hamadan
- County: Malayer
- District: Zand
- Rural District: Kamazan-e Vosta

Population (2016)
  - Total: 149
- Time zone: UTC+3:30 (IRST)

Deh Chaneh (Persian: ده چانه) (Note: Also romanized as Deh Chāneh; also known as Deh-i-Chunāi) is a village in Kamazan-e Vosta Rural District of Zand District in Malayer County, Hamadan province, Iran.

== Demographics ==
=== Population ===
At the time of the 2006 National Census, the village's population was 424 in 95 households. The following census in 2011 counted 217 people in 67 households. The 2016 census measured the population of the village as 149 people in 51 households.
