= Bahmani, Markazi =

Village in Markazi province, Iran

Bahmani Persian: بهمني
- Village
- Location within Iran
- Coordinates: 34°00′06″N 49°09′58″E
- Country: Iran
- Province: Markazi
- County: Shazand
- District: Zalian
- Rural District: Nahr-e Mian

Population (2016)
  - Total: 629
- Time zone: UTC+3:30 (IRST)

Bahmani (Persian: بهمني) (Note: Also romanized as Bahmanī) is a village in Nahr-e Mian Rural District (Note: Formerly Zalian Rural District) of Zalian District in Shazand County, (Note: Formerly Sarband County) Markazi province, Iran.

== Demographics ==
=== Population ===
At the time of the 2006 National Census, the village's population was 629 in 131 households. The following census in 2011 counted 570 people in 173 households. The 2016 census measured the population of the village as 629 people in 187 households.
