= Sangar, Markazi =

Village in Markazi province, Iran

Sangar Persian: سنگر
- Village
- Location within Iran
- Coordinates: 34°11′24″N 49°10′11″E
- Country: Iran
- Province: Markazi
- County: Shazand
- District: Zalian
- Rural District: Pol-e Doab

Population (2016)
  - Total: 89
- Time zone: UTC+3:30 (IRST)

Sangar (Persian: سنگر) (Note: Also known as Sangareh) is a village in Pol-e Doab Rural District of Zalian District in Shazand County, (Note: Formerly Sarband County) Markazi province, Iran.

== Demographics ==
=== Population ===
At the time of the 2006 National Census, the village's population was 101 in 26 households. The following census in 2011 counted 102 people in 29 households. The 2016 census measured the population of the village as 89 people in 28 households.
