= Cheshmeh Zowraq =

Village in Hamadan province, Iran

Cheshmeh Zowraq Persian: چشمه زورق
- Village
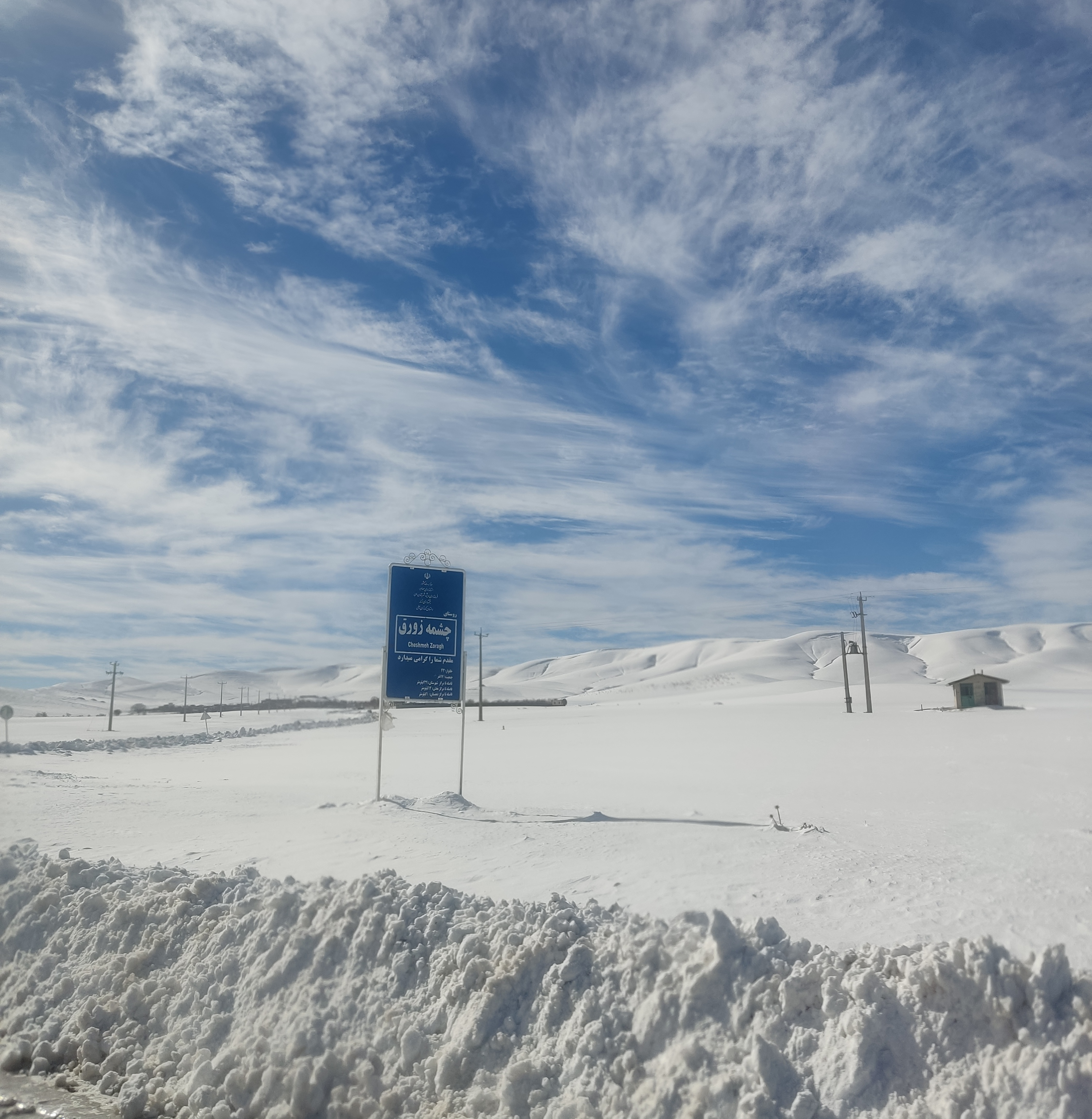
- Road sign near the village of Cheshmeh Zowraq

- Location within Iran
- Coordinates: 34°03′57″N 49°06′02″E
- Country: Iran
- Province: Hamadan
- County: Malayer
- District: Zand
- Rural District: Kamazan-e Vosta

Population (2016)
  - Total: 140
- Time zone: UTC+3:30 (IRST)

Cheshmeh Zowraq (Persian: چشمه زورق) (Note: Also known as Chashmeh-ye Dūrakh and Cheshmeh-ye Dūrakh) is a village in Kamazan-e Vosta Rural District of Zand District in Malayer County, Hamadan province, Iran.

== Demographics ==
=== Population ===
At the time of the 2006 National Census, the village's population was 210 in 47 households. The following census in 2011 counted 172 people in 43 households. The 2016 census measured the population of the village as 140 people in 45 households.
