= Zalian =

Village in Markazi province, Iran

Zalian Persian: زاليان
- Village
- Location within Iran
- Coordinates: 33°57′52″N 49°04′17″E
- Country: Iran
- Province: Markazi
- County: Shazand
- District: Zalian
- Rural District: Zalian

Population (2016)
  - Total: 444
- Time zone: UTC+3:30 (IRST)

Zalian (Persian: زاليان) (Note: Also romanized as Zāleyān, Zālīān, and Zālīyān) is a village in Zalian Rural District of Zalian District in Shazand County, (Note: Formerly Sarband County) Markazi province, Iran.

== Demographics ==
=== Population ===
At the time of the 2006 National Census, the village's population was 580 in 137 households. The following census in 2011 counted 535 people in 164 households. The 2016 census measured the population of the village as 444 people in 146 households, the most populous in its rural district.
