= Taleh Jerd-e Sofla =

Taleh Jerd-e Sofla تله جردسفلي
- Village
- Location within Iran
- Coordinates: 34°02′45″N 48°52′40″E
- Country: Iran
- Province: Hamadan
- County: Malayer
- Bakhsh: Zand
- Rural District: Kamazan-e Sofla

Population (2006)
  - Total: 59
- Time zone: UTC+3:30 (IRST)
  - Summer (DST): UTC+4:30 (IRDT)

Taleh Jerd-e Sofla (Persian: تله جردسفلي, also Romanized as Taleh Jerd-e Soflá and Taleh Jerd Sofla; also known as Talah Jerd and Talehjerd-e Pa’in) is a village in Kamazan-e Sofla Rural District, Zand District, Malayer County, Hamadan Province, Iran. At the 2006 census, its population was 59, in 17 families.
