= Keykaleh =

Village in Hamadan province, Iran

Keykaleh Persian: كيكله
- Village
- Location within Iran
- Coordinates: 34°06′47″N 48°56′19″E
- Country: Iran
- Province: Hamadan
- County: Malayer
- District: Zand
- Rural District: Kamazan-e Sofla

Population (2016)
  - Total: 115
- Time zone: UTC+3:30 (IRST)

Keykaleh (Persian: كيكله) (Note: Also known as Kepkaleh') is a village in Kamazan-e Sofla Rural District of Zand District in Malayer County, Hamadan province, Iran.

== Demographics ==
=== Population ===
At the time of the 2006 National Census, the village's population was 178 in 45 households. The following census in 2011 counted 123 people in 38 households. The 2016 census measured the population of the village as 115 people in 38 households.
