= Mahdaviyeh =

Village in Hamadan province, Iran

Mahdaviyeh Persian: مهدويه
- Village
- Location within Iran
- Coordinates: 34°04′55″N 48°53′07″E
- Country: Iran
- Province: Hamadan
- County: Malayer
- District: Zand
- Rural District: Kamazan-e Sofla

Population (2016)
  - Total: 378
- Time zone: UTC+3:30 (IRST)

Mahdaviyeh (Persian: مهدويه) (Note: Also romanized as Mahdavīyeh; formerly known as Qal‘eh Mehdi Khān (قلعه مهدي خان)) is a village in, and the capital of, Kamazan-e Sofla Rural District in Zand District of Malayer County, Hamadan province, Iran.

== Demographics ==
=== Population ===
At the time of the 2006 National Census, the village's population was 229 in 46 households. The following census in 2011 counted 385 people in 122 households. The 2016 census measured the population of the village as 378 people in 100 households.
