= Ashmizan =

Village in Hamadan province, Iran

Ashmizan Persian: اشميزان
- Village
- Location within Iran
- Coordinates: 34°06′12″N 48°53′04″E
- Country: Iran
- Province: Hamadan
- County: Malayer
- District: Zand
- Rural District: Kamazan-e Sofla

Population (2016)
  - Total: 128
- Time zone: UTC+3:30 (IRST)

Ashmizan (Persian: اشميزان) (Note: Also romanized as Āshmīzān; also known as Āchmīzān) is a village in Kamazan-e Sofla Rural District of Zand District in Malayer County, Hamadan province, Iran.

== Demographics ==
=== Population ===
At the time of the 2006 National Census, the village's population was 133 in 32 households. The following census in 2011 counted 131 people in 39 households. The 2016 census measured the population of the village as 128 people in 38 households.
