= Siah Choqa, Hamadan =

Village in Hamadan province, Iran

Siah Choqa Persian: سياچقا
- Village
- Location within Iran
- Coordinates: 34°08′25″N 49°00′57″E
- Country: Iran
- Province: Hamadan
- County: Malayer
- District: Zand
- Rural District: Kamazan-e Olya

Population (2016)
  - Total: 68
- Time zone: UTC+3:30 (IRST)

Siah Choqa (Persian: سياچقا) (Note: Also romanized as Seyah Cheqā, Sīāh Cheqā, and Sīāh Choqā)) is a village in Kamazan-e Olya Rural District of Zand District in Malayer County, Hamadan province, Iran.

== Demographics ==
=== Population ===
At the time of the 2006 National Census, the village's population was 117 in 28 households. The following census in 2011 counted 91 people in 31 households. The 2016 census measured the population of the village as 68 people in 24 households.
