= Chahar Cherik =

Village in Markazi province, Iran

Chahar Cherik Persian: چهارچريك
- Village
- Location within Iran
- Coordinates: 33°53′04″N 49°05′49″E
- Country: Iran
- Province: Markazi
- County: Shazand
- District: Zalian
- Rural District: Zalian

Population (2016)
  - Total: 248
- Time zone: UTC+3:30 (IRST)

Chahar Cherik (Persian: چهارچريك) (Note: Also romanized as Chahār Cherīk and Chehār Charik) is a village in Zalian Rural District of Zalian District in Shazand County, (Note: Formerly Sarband County) Markazi province, Iran.

== Demographics ==
=== Population ===
At the time of the 2006 National Census, the village's population was 288 in 81 households. The following census in 2011 counted 322 people in 102 households. The 2016 census measured the population of the village as 248 people in 83 households.
