= Gav Godar =

Gav Godar (Persian: گاوگدار) may refer to:

- Gav Godar, Hamadan
- Gav Godar, Markazi
