= Bighash =

Village in Hamadan province, Iran

Bighash Persian: بيغش
- Village
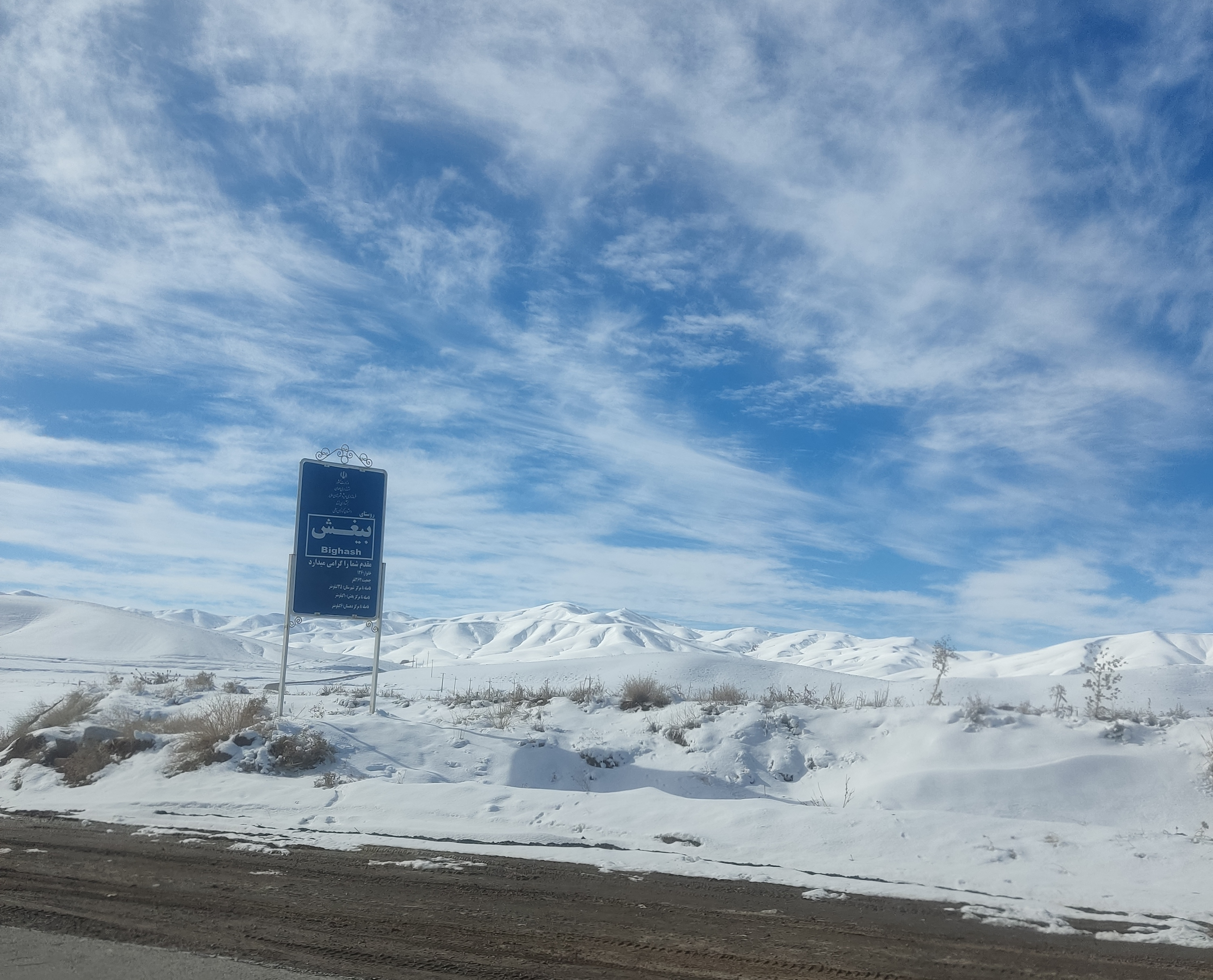
- Road to the village of Bighash in 2022

- Location within Iran
- Coordinates: 34°05′28″N 49°04′05″E
- Country: Iran
- Province: Hamadan
- County: Malayer
- District: Zand
- Rural District: Kamazan-e Vosta

Population (2016)
  - Total: 363
- Time zone: UTC+3:30 (IRST)

Bighash (Persian: بيغش) (Note: Also romanized as Bīghash; also known as Deh-i-Bakhah) is a village in Kamazan-e Vosta Rural District of Zand District in Malayer County, Hamadan province, Iran.

== Demographics ==
=== Population ===
At the time of the 2006 National Census, the village's population was 676 in 192 households. The following census in 2011 counted 548 people in 177 households. The 2016 census measured the population of the village as 363 people in 136 households.
