= Lanj Rud =

Village in Markazi province, Iran

Lanj Rud Persian: لنجرود
- Village
- Location within Iran
- Coordinates: 34°07′51″N 49°11′45″E
- Country: Iran
- Province: Markazi
- County: Shazand
- District: Zalian
- Rural District: Pol-e Doab

Population (2016)
  - Total: 1,688
- Time zone: UTC+3:30 (IRST)

Lanj Rud (Persian: لنجرود) (Note: Also romanized as Lanj Rūd and Lanjarūd; also known as Langarūd, Langerūd, Langrood, and Lanjrī) is a village in Pol-e Doab Rural District of Zalian District in Shazand County, (Note: Formerly Sarband County) Markazi province, Iran.

== Demographics ==
=== Population ===
At the time of the 2006 National Census, the village's population was 2,017 in 536 households. The following census in 2011 counted 2,002 people in 572 households. The 2016 census measured the population of the village as 1,688 people in 522 households.
