= Gusheh-ye Kasavand =

Village in Hamadan province, Iran

Gusheh-ye Kasavand Persian: گوشه كساوند
- Village
- Location within Iran
- Coordinates: 34°09′20″N 48°57′32″E
- Country: Iran
- Province: Hamadan
- County: Malayer
- District: Zand
- Rural District: Kamazan-e Olya

Population (2016)
  - Total: 201
- Time zone: UTC+3:30 (IRST)

Gusheh-ye Kasavand (Persian: گوشه كساوند) (Note: Also romanized as Gūsheh-ye Kasāvand; also known as Gūsheh) is a village in Kamazan-e Olya Rural District of Zand District in Malayer County, Hamadan province, Iran.

== Demographics ==
=== Population ===
At the time of the 2006 National Census, the village's population was 374 in 103 households. The following census in 2011 counted 304 people in 99 households. The 2016 census measured the population of the village as 201 people in 69 households.
