= Komazan =

Komazan (Persian: كمازان) may refer to:

- Komazan, Hamadan
- Komazan, Markazi
