= Sangdeh, Hamadan =

Village in Hamadan province, Iran

Sangdeh Persian: سنگده
- Village
- Location within Iran
- Coordinates: 34°04′18″N 49°02′08″E
- Country: Iran
- Province: Hamadan
- County: Malayer
- District: Zand
- Rural District: Kamazan-e Vosta

Population (2016)
  - Total: 56
- Time zone: UTC+3:30 (IRST)

Sangdeh (Persian: سنگده) is a village in Kamazan-e Vosta Rural District of Zand District in Malayer County, Hamadan province, Iran.

== Demographics ==
=== Population ===
At the time of the 2006 National Census, the village's population was 32 in eight households. The following census in 2011 counted 52 people in 11 households. The 2016 census measured the population of the village as 56 people in 15 households.
