= Najafabad, Shazand =

Village in Markazi province, Iran

Najafabad Persian: نجف اباد
- Village
- Location within Iran
- Coordinates: 33°53′18″N 49°01′15″E
- Country: Iran
- Province: Markazi
- County: Shazand
- District: Zalian
- Rural District: Zalian

Population (2016)
  - Total: 89
- Time zone: UTC+3:30 (IRST)

Najafabad (Persian: نجف اباد) (Note: Also romanized as Najafābād; also known as Gūr Derāz and Gūrdarāz) is a village in Zalian Rural District of Zalian District in Shazand County, (Note: Formerly Sarband County) Markazi province, Iran.

== Demographics ==
=== Population ===
At the time of the 2006 National Census, the village's population was 139 in 43 households. The following census in 2011 counted 124 people in 49 households. The 2016 census measured the population of the village as 89 people in 40 households.
