= Darreh Chenar =

Village in Hamadan province, Iran

Darreh Chenar Persian: دره چنار
- Village
- Location within Iran
- Coordinates: 34°05′58″N 48°48′11″E
- Country: Iran
- Province: Hamadan
- County: Malayer
- District: Zand
- Rural District: Kamazan-e Sofla

Population (2016)
  - Total: 264
- Time zone: UTC+3:30 (IRST)

Darreh Chenar (Persian: دره چنار) (Note: Also romanized as Darreh Chenār and Darreh-ye Chenār; also known as Dar-i-Chinār and Darreh Chinār) is a village in Kamazan-e Sofla Rural District of Zand District in Malayer County, Hamadan province, Iran.

== Demographics ==
=== Population ===
At the time of the 2006 National Census, the village's population was 182 in 49 households. The following census in 2011 counted 304 people in 86 households. The 2016 census measured the population of the village as 264 people in 94 households.
