= Kheyrabad, Shazand =

Village in Markazi province, Iran

Kheyrabad Persian: خيراباد
- Village
- Location within Iran
- Coordinates: 34°04′23″N 49°08′56″E
- Country: Iran
- Province: Markazi
- County: Shazand
- District: Zalian
- Rural District: Nahr-e Mian

Population (2016)
  - Total: 425
- Time zone: UTC+3:30 (IRST)

Kheyrabad (Persian: خيراباد) (Note: Also romanized as Kheyrābād; also known as Kerkhep, Khar Khop, Kharkhar, Kharkhap (خرخاپ), Kharkhep, Kherkheb, and Kherkhep) is a village in Nahr-e Mian Rural District (Note: Formerly Zalian Rural District) of Zalian District in Shazand County, (Note: Formerly Sarband County) Markazi province, Iran.

== Demographics ==
=== Population ===
At the time of the 2006 National Census, the village's population was 469 in 93 households. The following census in 2011 counted 461 people in 115 households. The 2016 census measured the population of the village as 425 people in 127 households.
