= Taleh Jerd-e Olya =

Taleh Jerd-e Olya تله جردعليا
- Village
- Location within Iran
- Coordinates: 34°03′00″N 48°52′38″E
- Country: Iran
- Province: Hamadan
- County: Malayer
- Bakhsh: Zand
- Rural District: Kamazan-e Sofla

Population (2006)
  - Total: 134
- Time zone: UTC+3:30 (IRST)
  - Summer (DST): UTC+4:30 (IRDT)

Taleh Jerd-e Olya (Persian: تله جردعليا, also Romanized as Taleh Jerd-e ‘Olyā and Taleh Jerd Olya; also known as Talah Jerd, Taleh Jerd-e Bālā, and Telehjerd-e Bālā) is a village in Kamazan-e Sofla Rural District, Zand District, Malayer County, Hamadan Province, Iran. At the 2006 census, its population was 134, in 31 families.
