= Sadeqabad, Markazi =

Village in Markazi province, Iran

Sadeqabad Persian: صادق اباد
- Village
- Location within Iran
- Coordinates: 33°53′02″N 49°10′54″E
- Country: Iran
- Province: Markazi
- County: Shazand
- District: Zalian
- Rural District: Zalian

Population (2016)
  - Total: 58
- Time zone: UTC+3:30 (IRST)

Sadeqabad (Persian: صادق اباد) (Note: Also romanized as Şādeqābād) is a village in Zalian Rural District of Zalian District in Shazand County, (Note: Formerly Sarband County) Markazi province, Iran.

== Demographics ==
=== Population ===
At the time of the 2006 National Census, the village's population was 187 in 56 households. The following census in 2011 counted 104 people in 32 households. The 2016 census measured the population of the village as 58 people in 25 households.
