= Emamzadeh Khatun =

Village in Hamadan province, Iran

Emamzadeh Khatun Persian: امامزاده خاتون
- Village
- Location within Iran
- Coordinates: 36°34′06″N 50°08′09″E
- Country: Iran
- Province: Hamadan
- County: Malayer
- District: Zand
- Rural District: Kamazan-e Sofla

Population (2016)
  - Total: 154
- Time zone: UTC+3:30 (IRST)

Emamzadeh Khatun (Persian: امامزاده خاتون) (Note: Also romanized as Emāmzādeh Khātūn; formerly known as Parīdar Abū ol Ḩasan (پریدر ابوالحسن), also romanized as Parī Dar Abū ol Ḩasan and Parī Dar-e Abū ol Ḩasan; also known as Paridar Abolhasan and Parīdar-e Abow Hasan) is a village in Kamazan-e Sofla Rural District of Zand District in Malayer County, Hamadan province, Iran.

== Demographics ==
=== Population ===
At the time of the 2006 National Census, the village's population was 271 in 71 households. The following census in 2011 counted 271 people in 76 households. The 2016 census measured the population of the village as 154 people in 50 households.
