= Sang-e Sefid, Markazi =

Sang-e Sefid سنگ سفيد
- Village
- Location within Iran
- Coordinates: 34°01′44″N 49°09′51″E
- Country: Iran
- Province: Markazi
- County: Shazand
- Bakhsh: Zalian
- Rural District: Nahr-e Mian

Population (2006)
  - Total: 431
- Time zone: UTC+3:30 (IRST)
  - Summer (DST): UTC+4:30 (IRDT)

Sang-e Sefid (Persian: سنگ سفيد, also Romanized as Sang Sefid; also known as Gol-e Zard) is a village in Nahr-e Mian Rural District, Zalian District, Shazand County, Markazi Province, Iran. At the 2006 census, its population was 431, in 101 families.
