= Do Joft =

Village in Markazi province, Iran

Do Joft Persian: دوجفت
- Village
- Location within Iran
- Coordinates: 33°57′03″N 49°03′28″E
- Country: Iran
- Province: Markazi
- County: Shazand
- District: Zalian
- Rural District: Zalian

Population (2016)
  - Total: 150
- Time zone: UTC+3:30 (IRST)

Do Joft (Persian: دوجفت) is a village in Zalian Rural District of Zalian District in Shazand County, (Note: Formerly Sarband County) Markazi province, Iran.

== Demographics ==
=== Population ===
At the time of the 2006 National Census, the village's population was 264 in 54 households. The following census in 2011 counted 206 people in 56 households. The 2016 census measured the population of the village as 150 people in 55 households.
