= Biatan-e Olya =

Biatan-e Olya بياتان عليا
- Village
- Location within Iran
- Coordinates: 34°01′43″N 48°57′54″E
- Country: Iran
- Province: Hamadan
- County: Malayer
- Bakhsh: Zand
- Rural District: Kamazan-e Sofla

Population (2006)
  - Total: 78
- Time zone: UTC+3:30 (IRST)
  - Summer (DST): UTC+4:30 (IRDT)

Biatan-e Olya (Persian: بياتان عليا, also Romanized as Bīātān-e ‘Olyā, Bayātān-e ‘Olyā, and Bayatan Olya; also known as Bayātān-e Bālā, Beyātān-e Bālā, and Bīātān) is a village in Kamazan-e Sofla Rural District, Zand District, Malayer County, Hamadan Province, Iran. At the 2006 census, its population was 78, in 28 families.
