= Eskan, Markazi =

Village in Markazi province, Iran

Eskan Persian: اسكان
- Village
- Location within Iran
- Coordinates: 34°05′01″N 49°20′54″E
- Country: Iran
- Province: Markazi
- County: Shazand
- District: Zalian
- Rural District: Pol-e Doab

Population (2016)
  - Total: 270
- Time zone: UTC+3:30 (IRST)

Eskan (Persian: اسكان) (Note: Also romanized as Eskān) is a village in Pol-e Doab Rural District of Zalian District in Shazand County, (Note: Formerly Sarband County) Markazi province, Iran.

== Demographics ==
=== Population ===
At the time of the 2006 National Census, the village's population was 469 in 149 households. The following census in 2011 counted 394 people in 136 households. The 2016 census measured the population of the village as 270 people in 110 households.
