= Ganj Dar =

Village in Hamadan province, Iran

Ganj Dar Persian: گنجدر
- Village
- Location within Iran
- Coordinates: 34°08′06″N 49°00′02″E
- Country: Iran
- Province: Hamadan
- County: Malayer
- District: Zand
- Rural District: Kamazan-e Olya

Population (2016)
  - Total: 105
- Time zone: UTC+3:30 (IRST)

Ganj Dar (Persian: گنجدر) (Note: Also known as Kanj Dar, Konj Dar, and Konjedar) is a village in Kamazan-e Olya Rural District of Zand District in Malayer County, Hamadan province, Iran.

== Demographics ==
=== Population ===
At the time of the 2006 National Census, the village's population was 146 in 34 households. The following census in 2011 counted 109 people in 32 households. The 2016 census measured the population of the village as 105 people in 37 households.
