= Pariyan, Hamadan =

Village in Hamadan province, Iran

Pariyan Persian: پريان
- Village
- Location within Iran
- Coordinates: 34°07′08″N 49°01′46″E
- Country: Iran
- Province: Hamadan
- County: Malayer
- District: Zand
- Rural District: Kamazan-e Vosta

Population (2016)
  - Total: 83
- Time zone: UTC+3:30 (IRST)

Pariyan (Persian: پريان) (Note: Also romanized as Parīyān; also known as Fārīdār, Parīdar, Paridar Pari, Parīdar Parī, and Parīdar-e Parī) is a village in Kamazan-e Vosta Rural District of Zand District in Malayer County, Hamadan province, Iran.

== Demographics ==
=== Population ===
At the time of the 2006 National Census, the village's population was 148 in 37 households. The following census in 2011 counted 100 people in 32 households. The 2016 census measured the population of the village as 83 people in 31 households.
