= Darreh Mianeh-ye Sofla =

Village in Hamadan province, Iran

Darreh Mianeh-ye Sofla Persian: دره ميانه عليا
- Village
- Location within Iran
- Coordinates: 34°04′13″N 48°48′24″E
- Country: Iran
- Province: Hamadan
- County: Malayer
- District: Zand
- Rural District: Kamazan-e Sofla

Population (2016)
  - Total: 136
- Time zone: UTC+3:30 (IRST)

Darreh Mianeh-ye Olya (Persian: دره ميانه عليا) (Note: Also romanized as Darreh Mīāneh-ye 'Olyā and Darreh Miyaneh Olya; also known as Darreh Meyāneh-ye Bālā, Darreh Mīāneh, and Darreh Mīāneh-ye Bālā) is a village in Kamazan-e Sofla Rural District of Zand District in Malayer County, Hamadan province, Iran.

== Demographics ==
=== Population ===
At the time of the 2006 National Census, the village's population was 151 in 33 households. The following census in 2011 counted 149 people in 49 households. The 2016 census measured the population of the village as 136 people in 51 households.
