= Tayemeh, Malayer =

Village in Hamadan province, Iran

Tayemeh Persian: طايمه
- Village
- Location within Iran
- Coordinates: 34°07′04″N 48°55′07″E
- Country: Iran
- Province: Hamadan
- County: Malayer
- District: Zand
- Rural District: Kamazan-e Sofla

Population (2016)
  - Total: 353
- Time zone: UTC+3:30 (IRST)

Tayemeh (Persian: طايمه) (Note: Also romanized as Ţa’emeh, Ţā’emeh, and Ţāyemeh) is a village in Kamazan-e Sofla Rural District of Zand District in Malayer County, Hamadan province, Iran.

== Demographics ==
=== Population ===
At the time of the 2006 National Census, the village's population was 520 in 136 households. The following census in 2011 counted 411 people in 116 households. The 2016 census measured the population of the village as 353 people in 117 households.
