= Beyatan-e Sukhteh =

Village in Markazi province, Iran

Beyatan-e Sukhteh Persian: بياتان سوخته
- Village
- Location within Iran
- Coordinates: 33°55′46″N 48°58′44″E
- Country: Iran
- Province: Markazi
- County: Shazand
- District: Zalian
- Rural District: Zalian

Population (2016)
  - Total: 111
- Time zone: UTC+3:30 (IRST)

Beyatan-e Sukhteh (Persian: بياتان سوخته) (Note: Also romanized as Beyātān-e Sūkhteh; also known as Bayātān, Bayatan-e Sukhteh, Bayātān-e Sūkhteh, Bayātūn, Beyātūn, Bīātūn-e Sūkhteh, and Biyatūn) is a village in Zalian Rural District of Zalian District in Shazand County, (Note: Formerly Sarband County) Markazi province, Iran.

== Demographics ==
=== Population ===
At the time of the 2006 National Census, the village's population was 124 in 36 households. The following census in 2011 counted 130 people in 40 households. The 2016 census measured the population of the village as 111 people in 35 households.
