= Savarabad-e Sofla =

Village in Markazi province, Iran

Savarabad-e Sofla Persian: سوارابادسفلي
- Village
- Location within Iran
- Coordinates: 34°09′26″N 49°09′17″E
- Country: Iran
- Province: Markazi
- County: Shazand
- District: Zalian
- Rural District: Pol-e Doab

Population (2016)
  - Total: 245
- Time zone: UTC+3:30 (IRST)

Savarabad-e Sofla (Persian: سوارابادسفلي) (Note: Also romanized as Savārābād-e Soflá; also known as Savārābād, Soārābād, and Sūrābād) is a village in Pol-e Doab Rural District of Zalian District in Shazand County, (Note: Formerly Sarband County) Markazi province, Iran.

== Demographics ==
=== Population ===
At the time of the 2006 National Census, the village's population was 332 in 80 households. The following census in 2011 counted 316 people in 92 households. The 2016 census measured the population of the village as 245 people in 82 households.
