= Hamzehlu-ye Olya =

Village in Hamadan province, Iran

Hamzehlu-ye Olya Persian: حمزه لوعليا
- Village
- Location within Iran
- Coordinates: 34°02′32″N 49°05′32″E
- Country: Iran
- Province: Hamadan
- County: Malayer
- District: Zand
- Rural District: Kamazan-e Vosta

Population (2016)
  - Total: 108
- Time zone: UTC+3:30 (IRST)

Hamzehlu-ye Olya (Persian: حمزه لوعليا) (Note: Also romanized as Ḩamzehlū-ye ‘Olyā; also known as Ḩamzeh ‘Alī Bālā, Ḩamzeh ‘Alī-ye Bālā, and Ḩamzehlū-ye Bālā) is a village in Kamazan-e Vosta Rural District of Zand District in Malayer County, Hamadan province, Iran.

== Demographics ==
=== Population ===
At the time of the 2006 National Census, the village's population was 183 in 42 households. The following census in 2011 counted 119 people in 35 households. The 2016 census measured the population of the village as 108 people in 38 households.
