= Arges-e Olya =

Village in Hamadan province, Iran

Arges-e Olya Persian: ارگس عليا
- Village
- Location within Iran
- Coordinates: 34°04′12″N 48°50′45″E
- Country: Iran
- Province: Hamadan
- County: Malayer
- District: Zand
- Rural District: Kamazan-e Sofla

Population (2016)
  - Total: 122
- Time zone: UTC+3:30 (IRST)

Arges-e Olya (Persian: ارگس عليا) (Note: Also romanized as Ārges-e ‘Olyā; also known as Qal‘eh Rafī‘ (قلعه رفيع)) is a village in Kamazan-e Sofla Rural District of Zand District in Malayer County, Hamadan province, Iran.

== Demographics ==
=== Population ===
At the time of the 2006 National Census, the village's population was 192 in 39 households. The following census in 2011 counted 132 people in 34 households. The 2016 census measured the population of the village as 122 people in 42 households.
