= Qaleh-ye Gav Godar =

Village in Markazi province, Iran

Qaleh-ye Gav Godar Persian: قلعه گاوگدار
- Village
- Location within Iran
- Coordinates: 34°06′32″N 49°21′39″E
- Country: Iran
- Province: Markazi
- County: Shazand
- District: Zalian
- Rural District: Pol-e Doab

Population (2016)
  - Total: 139
- Time zone: UTC+3:30 (IRST)

Qaleh-ye Gav Godar (Persian: قلعه گاوگدار) (Note: Also romanized as Qal‘eh-ye Gāv Godār; also known as Gāv Godār) is a village in Pol-e Doab Rural District of Zalian District in Shazand County, (Note: Formerly Sarband County) Markazi province, Iran.

== Demographics ==
=== Population ===
At the time of the 2006 National Census, the village's population was 151 in 42 households. The following census in 2011 counted 134 people in 41 households. The 2016 census measured the population of the village as 139 people in 44 households.
