= Sar Chal, Markazi =

Village in Markazi province, Iran

Sar Chal Persian: سرچال
- Village
- Location within Iran
- Coordinates: 34°09′18″N 49°07′22″E
- Country: Iran
- Province: Markazi
- County: Shazand
- District: Zalian
- Rural District: Pol-e Doab

Population (2016)
  - Total: 271
- Time zone: UTC+3:30 (IRST)

Sar Chal (Persian: سرچال) (Note: Also romanized as Sar Chāl) is a village in Pol-e Doab Rural District of Zalian District in Shazand County, (Note: Formerly Sarband County) Markazi province, Iran.

== Demographics ==
=== Population ===
At the time of the 2006 National Census, the village's population was 613 in 139 households. The following census in 2011 counted 419 people in 130 households. The 2016 census measured the population of the village as 271 people in 91 households.
