= Zanganeh =

Zanganeh may refer to:

- Zangana (tribe), a Kurdish tribe in western Iran and Iraq
- Zanganeh, West Azerbaijan, a place in West Azerbaijan Province, Iran
- Zangeneh (disambiguation), places in Iran
- Lila Azam Zanganeh, French writer
- Pari Zanganeh, Iranian singer
