= Muhajir =

Muhajir or Mohajir (Arabic: مهاجر, muhājir; pl. مهاجرون, muhājirūn) is an Arabic word meaning migrant which is also used in other languages spoken by Muslims, including English. In English, this term and its derivatives may refer in a general sense to individuals or groups, including the following incomplete list:

== Social groups ==
- Muhajirun, the early Muslims (Muhammad and his companions) who migrated from Mecca to Medina in modern-day Saudi Arabia
- Muhajir (Pakistan), a term used to refer to an multi-origin ethnic group of Pakistan, which includes the Muslims, who migrated from various parts of present-day India, to settle in the newly created state for Muslims, Pakistan (mainly after the partition of India in August 1947), and their descendants
- Muhacir (Turkish variant), Ottoman Muslims who emigrated to Anatolia from the late 18th century until the end of the 20th century
- Muhaxhir (Albanians), Ottoman Albanian communities that left their homes as refugees or were transferred because of various wars

== Organizations ==
- Al-Muhajiroun, a banned Salafi Islamic jihadist terrorist network that was formerly based in the United Kingdom

== Vehicles ==
- Qods Mohajer, Arabic for "sacred migrant"

== People ==
- Abdullah al-Muhajir, alias of José Padilla (born 1970), U.S. citizen who was convicted of aiding terrorists in 2007
- Abu al-Muhajir Dinar (died 683), governor of Ifriqiya (North Africa) under the Umayyad Caliphate
- Abu Hamza al-Muhajir (1968–2010), leader of Al-Qaeda in Iraq after June 2006
- Abu Omar al-Muhajir (died 2022), Islamic spokesperson
- Abu Sulayman al-Muhajir (born 1984), senior member of al-Qaeda's Al-Nusra Front
- Abul-Hasan al-Muhajir (1977–2019), Islamic spokesman
- Ahmad al-Muhajir (873–956), progenitor of the Sadah Ba 'Alawi group of Hadhrami Sayyid families
- Al-Muhajir ibn Abi Umayya (fl. 630–633), early Muslim commander
- Ismail ibn Abd Allah ibn Abi al-Muhajir (fl. 718–720), governor of Ifriqiya (North Africa) under the Umayyad Caliphate
- Muhadjir Effendy (born 1956), 28th Indonesian Minister of Education and Culture
- Muhajir ibn Khalid (died 657), partisan of Caliph Ali

== See also ==
- Mahajeran (disambiguation)
- Christian emigration
- Exodus (disambiguation)
- Jewish refugees
