= Hamzehlu-ye Sofla =

Village in Hamadan province, Iran

Hamzehlu-ye Sofla Persian: حمزه لوسفلي
- Village
- Location within Iran
- Coordinates: 34°03′28″N 49°04′40″E
- Country: Iran
- Province: Hamadan
- County: Malayer
- District: Zand
- Rural District: Kamazan-e Vosta

Population (2016)
  - Total: 112
- Time zone: UTC+3:30 (IRST)

Hamzehlu-ye Sofla (Persian: حمزه لوسفلي) (Note: Also romanized as Hamzehloo Sofla and Ḩamzehlū-ye Soflá; also known as Ḩamzehlū and Ḩamzehlū-ye Pā’īn) is a village in Kamazan-e Vosta Rural District of Zand District in Malayer County, Hamadan province, Iran.

== Demographics ==
=== Population ===
At the time of the 2006 National Census, the village's population was 182 in 46 households. The following census in 2011 counted 222 people in 64 households. The 2016 census measured the population of the village as 112 people in 34 households.
