= Zangeneh-ye Sofla =

Village in Hamadan province, Iran

Zangeneh-ye Sofla Persian: زنگنه سفلي
- Village
- Location within Iran
- Coordinates: 34°08′39″N 48°59′06″E
- Country: Iran
- Province: Hamadan
- County: Malayer
- District: Zand
- Rural District: Kamazan-e Olya

Population (2016)
  - Total: 300
- Time zone: UTC+3:30 (IRST)

Zangeneh-ye Sofla (Persian: زنگنه سفلي) (Note: Also romanized as Zangeneh-ye Soflá; also known as Zangeneh and Zangeneh-ye Pā’īn) is a village in Kamazan-e Olya Rural District of Zand District in Malayer County, Hamadan province, Iran.

== Demographics ==
=== Population ===
At the time of the 2006 National Census, the village's population was 366 in 102 households. The following census in 2011 counted 337 people in 120 households. The 2016 census measured the population of the village as 300 people in 108 households.
