= Arges-e Sofla =

Village in Hamadan province, Iran

Arges-e Sofla Persian: ارگس سفلي
- Village
- Location within Iran
- Coordinates: 34°04′29″N 48°51′48″E
- Country: Iran
- Province: Hamadan
- County: Malayer
- District: Zand
- Rural District: Kamazan-e Sofla

Population (2016)
  - Total: 118
- Time zone: UTC+3:30 (IRST)

Arges-e Sofla (Persian: ارگس سفلي) (Note: Also romanized as Argas Sofla and Arges-e Soflá; also known as Areks, Areks-e Soflá, Erkes-e Pā’īn, and Erkes-e Soflá) is a village in Kamazan-e Sofla Rural District of Zand District in Malayer County, Hamadan province, Iran.

== Demographics ==
=== Population ===
At the time of the 2006 National Census, the village's population was 154 in 31 households. The following census in 2011 counted 134 people in 36 households. The 2016 census measured the population of the village as 118 people in 36 households.
