= Zalian Rural District =

Rural district in Markazi province, Iran

Zalian Rural District Persian: دهستان زاليان
- Rural District
- Location within Iran
- Coordinates: 33°55′N 49°06′E
- Country: Iran
- Province: Markazi
- County: Shazand
- District: Zalian
- Established: 1990
- Capital: Deh-e Kaid

Population (2016)
  - Total: 1,753
- Time zone: UTC+3:30 (IRST)

Zalian Rural District (Persian: دهستان زاليان) is in Zalian District of Shazand County, (Note: Formerly Sarband County) Markazi province, Iran. Its capital is the village of Deh-e Kaid.

== Demographics ==
=== Population ===
At the time of the 2006 National Census, the rural district's population was 2,911 in 771 households. There were 2,408 inhabitants in 754 households at the following census of 2011. The 2016 census measured the population of the rural district as 1,753 in 638 households. The most populous of its 23 villages was Zalian, with 444 people.

=== Other villages in the rural district ===
- Beyatan-e Sukhteh
- Chahar Cherik
- Do Joft
- Kolah Chub
- Najafabad
- Sadeqabad
