= Kamazan =

Village in Hamadan province, Iran

Kamazan Persian: كمازان
- Village
- Location within Iran
- Coordinates: 34°09′05″N 48°57′06″E
- Country: Iran
- Province: Hamadan
- County: Malayer
- District: Zand
- Rural District: Kamazan-e Olya

Population (2016)
  - Total: 487
- Time zone: UTC+3:30 (IRST)

Kamazan (Persian: كمازان) (Note: Also romanized as Kamāzān and Komāzān) is a village in Kamazan-e Olya Rural District of Zand District in Malayer County, Hamadan province, Iran.

== Demographics ==
=== Population ===
At the time of the 2006 National Census, the village's population was 829 in 236 households. The following census in 2011 counted 651 people in 229 households. The 2016 census measured the population of the village as 487 people in 183 households.
