= Darreh Mianeh-ye Olya =

Village in Hamadan province, Iran

Darreh Mianeh-ye Olya Persian: دره ميانه عليا
- Village
- Location within Iran
- Coordinates: 34°04′13″N 48°48′24″E
- Country: Iran
- Province: Hamadan
- County: Malayer
- District: Zand
- Rural District: Kamazan-e Sofla

Population (2016)
  - Total: 288
- Time zone: UTC+3:30 (IRST)

Darreh Mianeh-ye Olya (Persian: دره ميانه عليا) (Note: Also romanized as Darreh Miyaneh Olya and Darreh Mīāneh-ye 'Olyā; also known as Darreh Meyāneh-ye Bālā, Darreh Mīāneh, and Darreh Mīāneh-ye Bālā) is a village in Kamazan-e Sofla Rural District of Zand District in Malayer County, Hamadan province, Iran.

== Demographics ==
=== Population ===
At the time of the 2006 National Census, the village's population was 420 in 99 households. The following census in 2011 counted 317 people in 91 households. The 2016 census measured the population of the village as 288 people in 91 households.
