= Gol-e Zard-e Qaleh =

Village in Markazi province, Iran

Gol-e Zard-e Qaleh Persian: گل زردقلعه
- Village
- Location within Iran
- Coordinates: 33°57′31″N 49°09′14″E
- Country: Iran
- Province: Markazi
- County: Shazand
- District: Zalian
- Rural District: Nahr-e Mian

Population (2016)
  - Total: 597
- Time zone: UTC+3:30 (IRST)

Gol-e Zard-e Qaleh (Persian: گل زردقلعه) (Note: Also romanized as Gol-e Zard-e Qal‘eh; also known as Gol Zard, Gol-e Zard, and Gul-i-Zard) is a village in Nahr-e Mian Rural District (Note: Formerly Zalian Rural District) of Zalian District in Shazand County, (Note: Formerly Sarband County) Markazi province, Iran.

== Demographics ==
=== Population ===
At the time of the 2006 National Census, the village's population was 818 in 222 households. The following census in 2011 counted 683 people in 228 households. The 2016 census measured the population of the village as 597 people in 215 households.
