= Tureh =

City in Markazi province, Iran

Tureh Persian: توره
- City
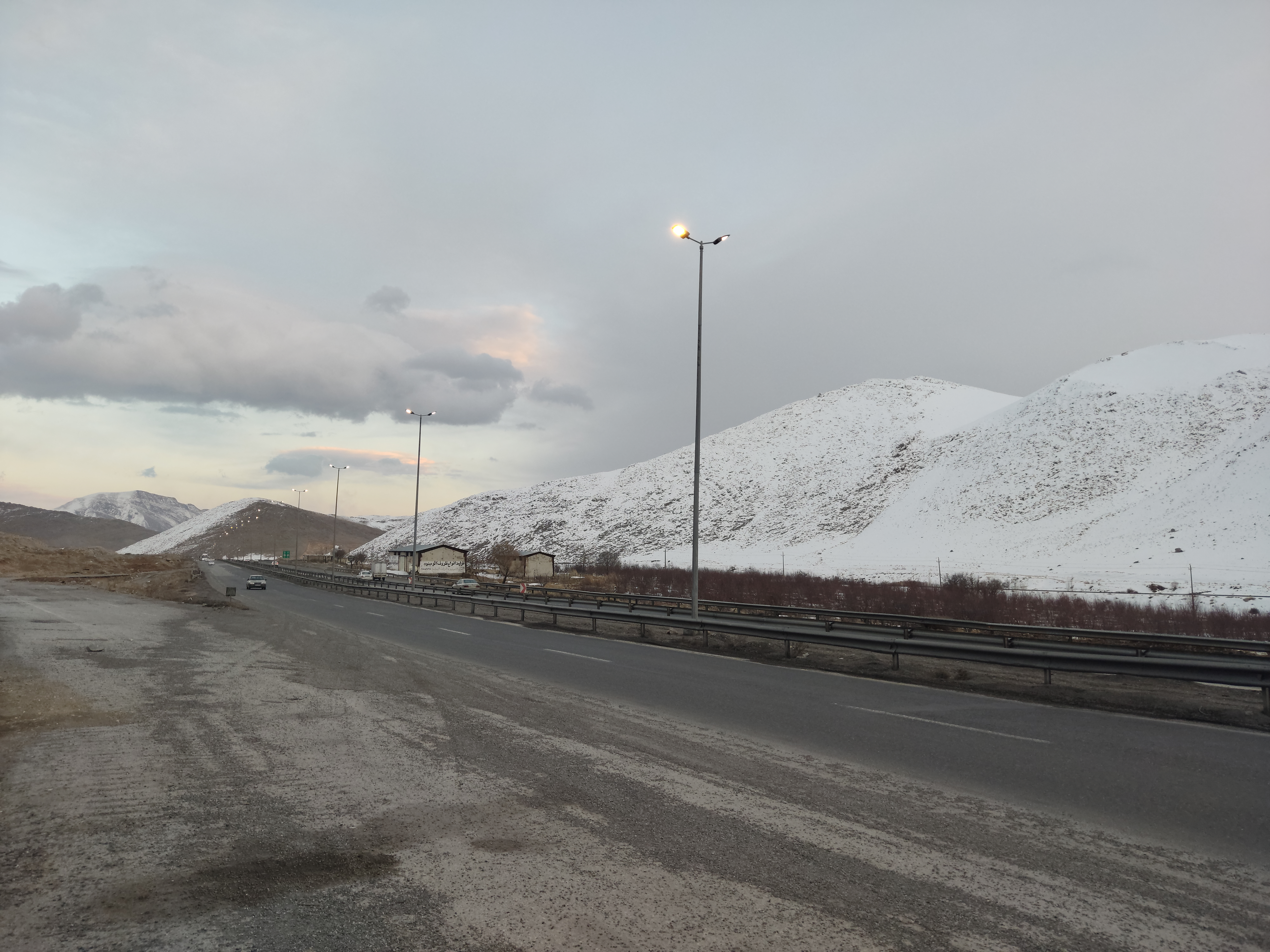
- Road in the city of Tureh

- Location within Iran
- Coordinates: 34°02′36″N 49°17′19″E
- Country: Iran
- Province: Markazi
- County: Shazand
- District: Zalian
- Established as a city: 2003

Population (2016)
  - Total: 2,302
- Time zone: UTC+3:30 (IRST)

Tureh (Persian: توره) (Note: Also romanized as Tūreh; also known as Tīleh and Tūleh) is a city in, and the capital of, Zalian District in Shazand County, (Note: Formerly Sarband County) Markazi province, Iran. It also serves as the administrative center for Pol-e Doab Rural District. The village of Tureh was converted to a city in 2003.

== Demographics ==
=== Population ===
At the time of the 2006 National Census, the city's population was 2,167 in 571 households. The following census in 2011 counted 2,331 people in 676 households. The 2016 census measured the population of the city as 2,302 people in 722 households.
