= Gol Zard-e Bala =

Gol Zard-e Bala گل زردبالا
- Village
- Location within Iran
- Coordinates: 33°27′26″N 47°38′15″E
- Country: Iran
- Province: Lorestan
- County: Kuhdasht
- Bakhsh: Central
- Rural District: Kuhdasht-e Jonubi

Population (2006)
  - Total: 42
- Time zone: UTC+3:30 (IRST)
  - Summer (DST): UTC+4:30 (IRDT)

Gol Zard-e Bala (Persian: گل زردبالا, also Romanized as Gol Zard-e Bālā and Gul-i-Zard Bāla; also known as Gol Zard and Gol Zard-e ‘Olyā) is a village in Kuhdasht-e Jonubi Rural District, in the Central District of Kuhdasht County, Lorestan Province, Iran. At the 2006 census, its population was 42, in 9 families.
