= Zanganeh, Kermanshah =

Zanganeh زنگنه
- Village
- Location within Iran
- Coordinates: 34°43′12″N 47°29′54″E
- Country: Iran
- Province: Kermanshah
- County: Sonqor
- Bakhsh: Central
- Rural District: Sarab

Population (2006)
  - Total: 204
- Time zone: UTC+3:30 (IRST)
  - Summer (DST): UTC+4:30 (IRDT)

Zanganeh (Persian: زنگنه) is a village in Sarab Rural District, in the Central District of Sonqor County, Kermanshah Province, Iran. At the 2006 census, its population was 204, in 51 families.
