= Zangeneh-ye Bon Rud =

Zangeneh-ye Bon Rud زنگنه بنرود
- Village
- Location within Iran
- Coordinates: 29°45′26″N 51°58′34″E
- Country: Iran
- Province: Fars
- County: Shiraz
- Bakhsh: Arzhan
- Rural District: Dasht-e Arzhan

Population (2006)
  - Total: 787
- Time zone: UTC+3:30 (IRST)
  - Summer (DST): UTC+4:30 (IRDT)

Zangeneh-ye Bon Rud (Persian: زنگنه بن‌رود, also Romanized as Zangeneh-ye Bon Rūd; also known as Zangeneh) is a village in Dasht-e Arzhan Rural District, Arzhan District, Shiraz County, Fars province, Iran. At the 2006 census, its population was 787, in 173 families.
