= Gol Zard-e Malmir =

Gol Zard-e Malmir گل زردمالمير
- Village
- Location within Iran
- Coordinates: 33°43′49″N 49°08′28″E
- Country: Iran
- Province: Markazi
- County: Shazand
- Bakhsh: Sarband
- Rural District: Hendudar

Population (2006)
  - Total: 110
- Time zone: UTC+3:30 (IRST)
  - Summer (DST): UTC+4:30 (IRDT)

Gol Zard-e Malmir (Persian: گل زردمالمير, also Romanized as Gol Zard-e Mālmīr and Gol-e Zard-e Mālmīr; also known as Gol-e Zard, Gol Zard, and Gul-i-Zard) is a village in Hendudar Rural District, Sarband District, Shazand County, Markazi Province, Iran. At the 2006 census, its population was 110, in 39 families.
