= Kamazan-e Vosta Rural District =

Rural district in Hamadan province, Iran

Kamazan-e Vosta Rural District Persian: دهستان كمازان وسطي
- Rural District
- Location within Iran
- Coordinates: 34°05′N 49°05′E
- Country: Iran
- Province: Hamadan
- County: Malayer
- District: Zand
- Established: 1990
- Capital: Piruz

Population (2016)
  - Total: 2,658
- Time zone: UTC+3:30 (IRST)

Kamazan-e Vosta Rural District (Persian: دهستان كمازان وسطي) is in Zand District of Malayer County, Hamadan province, Iran. Its capital is the village of Piruz.

== Demographics ==
=== Population ===
At the time of the 2006 National Census, the rural district's population was 4,163 in 1,083 households. There were 3,486 inhabitants in 1,065 households at the following census of 2011. The 2016 census measured the population of the rural district as 2,658 in 902 households. The most populous of its 12 villages was Piruz, with 821 people.

=== Other villages in the rural district ===
- Bighash
- Cheshmeh Zowraq
- Cheshmeh-ye Ali Mohammad
- Deh Chaneh
- Garjai
- Hamzehlu-ye Olya
- Hamzehlu-ye Sofla
- Pariyan
- Sangdeh
