= Kamazan-e Olya Rural District =

Rural district in Hamadan province, Iran

Kamazan-e Olya Rural District Persian: دهستان كمازان عليا
- Rural District
- Location within Iran
- Coordinates: 34°11′N 49°00′E
- Country: Iran
- Province: Hamadan
- County: Malayer
- District: Zand
- Established: 1987
- Capital: Zangeneh

Population (2016)
  - Total: 2,964
- Time zone: UTC+3:30 (IRST)

Kamazan-e Olya Rural District (Persian: دهستان كمازان عليا) is in Zand District of Malayer County, Hamadan province, Iran. It is administered from the city of Zangeneh. (Note: Formerly known as Zanganeh-ye Olya)

== Demographics ==
=== Population ===
At the time of the 2006 National Census, the rural district's population was 4,434 in 1,129 households. There were 3,564 inhabitants in 1,128 households at the following census of 2011. The 2016 census measured the population of the rural district as 2,964 in 1,013 households. The most populous of its 12 villages was Mishen, with 831 people.

=== Other villages in the rural district ===
- Ahmadiyeh
- Deh Mianeh
- Ganj Dar
- Golparabad
- Gusheh-ye Kasavand
- Kamazan
- Kasavand
- Nahandar
- Siah Choqa
- Zangeneh-ye Sofla
