= Savarabad, Khuzestan =

Savarabad سواراباد
- Village
- Location within Iran
- Coordinates: 32°10′09″N 49°29′56″E
- Country: Iran
- Province: Khuzestan
- County: Andika
- Bakhsh: Abezhdan
- Rural District: Abezhdan

Population (2006)
  - Total: 43
- Time zone: UTC+3:30 (IRST)
  - Summer (DST): UTC+4:30 (IRDT)

Savarabad (Persian: سواراباد, also Romanized as Savārābād; also known as Savārābād-e Gūt-e Kalāt) is a village in Abezhdan Rural District, Abezhdan District, Andika County, Khuzestan Province, Iran. At the 2006 census, its population was 43, in 5 families.
