= Zanganeh, Lamerd =

Zanganeh زنگنه
- Village
- Location within Iran
- Coordinates: 27°21′33″N 53°06′32″E
- Country: Iran
- Province: Fars
- County: Lamerd
- Bakhsh: Central
- Rural District: Howmeh

Population (2006)
  - Total: 70
- Time zone: UTC+3:30 (IRST)
  - Summer (DST): UTC+4:30 (IRDT)

Zanganeh (Persian: زنگنه) is a village in Howmeh Rural District, in the Central District of Lamerd County, Fars province, Iran. At the 2006 census, its population was 70, in 15 families.
