= Gol Zard-e Pain =

Gol Zard-e Pain گل زردپايين
- Village
- Location within Iran
- Coordinates: 33°27′05″N 47°37′26″E
- Country: Iran
- Province: Lorestan
- County: Kuhdasht
- Bakhsh: Central
- Rural District: Kuhdasht-e Jonubi

Population (2006)
  - Total: 85
- Time zone: UTC+3:30 (IRST)
  - Summer (DST): UTC+4:30 (IRDT)

Gol Zard-e Pain (Persian: گل زردپايين, also Romanized as Gol Zard-e Pā‘īn; also known as Gol Zard and Gol Zard-e Soflá) is a village in Kuhdasht-e Jonubi Rural District, in the Central District of Kuhdasht County, Lorestan Province, Iran. At the 2006 census, its population was 85, in 14 families.
