= Gol Zard, Borujerd =

Gol Zard گل زرد
- Village
- Location within Iran
- Coordinates: 34°01′34″N 48°45′53″E
- Country: Iran
- Province: Lorestan
- County: Borujerd
- Bakhsh: Oshtorinan
- Rural District: Oshtorinan

Population (2006)
  - Total: 205
- Time zone: UTC+3:30 (IRST)
  - Summer (DST): UTC+4:30 (IRDT)

Gol Zard (Persian: گل زرد, also Romanized as Gol-e Zard) is a village in Oshtorinan Rural District, Oshtorinan District, Borujerd County, Lorestan Province, Iran. At the 2006 census, its population was 205, in 67 families.
