= Tazehabad Bahram =

Village in Lorestan, Iran

Tazehabad Bahram تازه آباد بهرام
- Village
- Country: Iran
- Province: Lorestan
- County: Delfan
- Bakhsh: Kakavand
- Rural District: Kakavand-e Sharqi

Population (2006)
  - Total: 41
- Time zone: UTC+3:30 (IRST)
  - Summer (DST): UTC+4:30 (IRDT)

Tazehabad Bahram (Persian: تازه آباد بهرام, also Romanized as Tāzehābād Bahrām; also known as Gol Zard) is a village in Kakavand-e Sharqi Rural District, Kakavand District, Delfan County, Lorestan Province, Iran. At the 2006 census, its population was 41, in 9 families.
