= Gol Zard, Selseleh =

Gol Zard گل زرد
- Village
- Location within Iran
- Coordinates: 33°52′08″N 48°14′05″E
- Country: Iran
- Province: Lorestan
- County: Selseleh
- Bakhsh: Central
- Rural District: Yusefvand

Population (2006)
  - Total: 255
- Time zone: UTC+3:30 (IRST)
  - Summer (DST): UTC+4:30 (IRDT)

Gol Zard (Persian: گل زرد, also Romanized as Gol-e Zard and Gul-i-Zard) is a village in Yusefvand Rural District, in the Central District of Selseleh County, Lorestan Province, Iran. At the 2006 census, its population was 255, in 53 families.
