= Zangeneh, Hamadan =

City in Hamadan province, Iran

Zangeneh Persian: زنگنه
- City
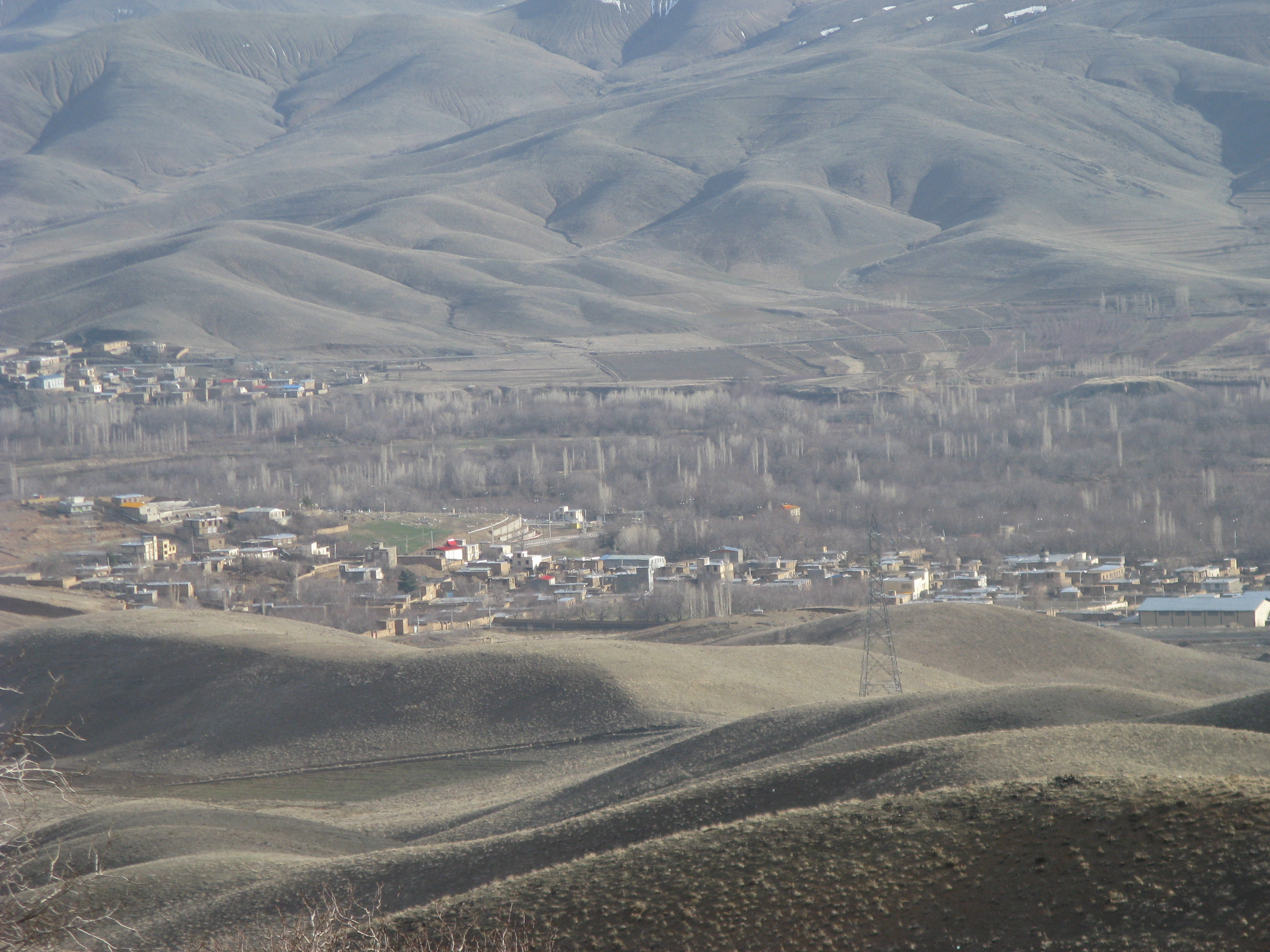
- The city of Zangeneh

- Location within Iran
- Coordinates: 34°09′18″N 49°00′38″E
- Country: Iran
- Province: Hamadan
- County: Malayer
- District: Zand
- Established as a city: 2005

Population (2016)
  - Total: 621
- Time zone: UTC+3:30 (IRST)

Zangeneh (Persian: زنگنه) (Note: Also romanized as Zanganeh; formerly the village of Zangeneh-ye Olya (زنگنه عليا)) is a city in, and the capital of, Zand District in Malayer County, Hamadan province, Iran. It also serves as the administrative center for Kamazan-e Olya Rural District. The village of Zangeneh-ye Olya was converted to a city and renamed Zangeneh in 2005.

== Demographics ==
=== Population ===
At the time of the 2006 National Census, the city's population was 844 in 242 households. The following census in 2011 counted 725 people in 239 households. The 2016 census measured the population of the city as 621 people in 238 households.
