= Zangeneh (surname) =

Zangeneh (Persian: زنگنه) is a surname. Notable people with the surname include:

- Sheikh Ali khan Zangeneh (1669–1691), Iranian politician
- Abdul Hamid Zangeneh (1899–1951), Iranian politician and scholar
- Arman Zangeneh (born 1993), Iranian basketball player
- Bijan Namdar Zangeneh (born 1953), Iranian politician
- Pegah Zangeneh (born 1984), Iranian karateka
