= Nahr-e Mian Rural District =

Rural district in Markazi province, Iran

Nahr-e Mian Rural District Persian: دهستان نهر ميان
- Rural District
- Location within Iran
- Coordinates: 34°00′N 49°11′E
- Country: Iran
- Province: Markazi
- County: Shazand
- District: Zalian
- Established: 1986
- Capital: Nahr-e Mian

Population (2016)
  - Total: 8,245
- Time zone: UTC+3:30 (IRST)

Nahr-e Mian Rural District (Persian: دهستان نهر ميان) (Note: Formerly Zalian Rural District (دهستان زاليان)) is in Zalian District of Shazand County, (Note: Formerly Sarband County) Markazi province, Iran. Its capital is the village of Nahr-e Mian.

== Demographics ==
=== Population ===
At the time of the 2006 National Census, the rural district's population was 9,741 in 2,401 households. There were 8,945 inhabitants in 2,687 households at the following census of 2011. The 2016 census measured the population of the rural district as 8,245 in 2,712 households. The most populous of its 21 villages was Nahr-e Mian, with 1,634 people.

=== Other villages in the rural district ===
- Bahmani
- Gol-e Zard-e Qaleh
- Jalayer
- Kheyrabad
- Qarah Bonyad
- Qush Tappeh
