= Kamazan-e Sofla Rural District =

Rural district in Hamadan province, Iran

Kamazan-e Sofla Rural District Persian: دهستان كمازان سفلي
- Rural District
- Location within Iran
- Coordinates: 34°05′N 48°54′E
- Country: Iran
- Province: Hamadan
- County: Malayer
- District: Zand
- Established: 1987
- Capital: Mahdaviyeh

Population (2016)
  - Total: 3,776
- Time zone: UTC+3:30 (IRST)

Kamazan-e Sofla Rural District (Persian: دهستان كمازان سفلي) is in Zand District of Malayer County, Hamadan province, Iran. Its capital is the village of Mahdaviyeh.

== Demographics ==
=== Population ===
At the time of the 2006 National Census, the rural district's population was 4,985 in 1,241 households. There were 4,405 inhabitants in 1,344 households at the following census of 2011. The 2016 census measured the population of the rural district as 3,776 in 1,247 households. The most populous of its 27 villages was Peyhan, with 620 people.

=== Other villages in the rural district ===
- Arges-e Olya
- Arges-e Sofla
- Ashmizan
- Darreh Chenar
- Darreh Mianeh-ye Olya
- Darreh Mianeh-ye Sofla
- Emamzadeh Khatun
- Keykaleh
- Malian
- Masalhan
- Tayemeh
