= Mahajeran District =

District in Markazi province, Iran

Mahajeran District Persian: بخش مهاجران
- District
- Location within Iran
- Coordinates: 34°03′N 49°26′E
- Country: Iran
- Province: Markazi
- County: Shazand
- Established: 2024
- Capital: Mahajeran
- Time zone: UTC+3:30 (IRST)

Mahajeran District (Persian: بخش مهاجران) is in Shazand County, (Note: Formerly Sarband County) Markazi province, Iran. Its capital is the city of Mahajeran, whose population at the time of the 2016 National Census was 19,346 people in 6,155 households.

== History ==
In 2024, the city of Mahajeran and 17 villages were separated from Zalian District in the formation of Mahajeran District.

== Demographics ==
=== Administrative divisions ===
Mahajeran District
Administrative Divisions
Khosbijan RD
Mahajeran RD
Mahajeran (city)
RD = Rural District
