= Pol-e Doab Rural District =

Rural district in Markazi province, Iran

Pol-e Doab Rural District Persian: دهستان پل دوآب
- Rural District
- Location within Iran
- Coordinates: 34°05′N 49°18′E
- Country: Iran
- Province: Markazi
- County: Shazand
- District: Zalian
- Established: 1986
- Capital: Tureh

Population (2016)
  - Total: 10,752
- Time zone: UTC+3:30 (IRST)

Pol-e Doab Rural District (Persian: دهستان پل دوآب) is in Zalian District of Shazand County, (Note: Formerly Sarband County) Markazi province, Iran. It is administered from the city of Tureh.

== Demographics ==
=== Population ===
At the time of the 2006 National Census, the rural district's population was 27,846 in 7,365 households. There were 12,836 inhabitants in 3,818 households at the following census of 2011. The 2016 census measured the population of the rural district as 10,752 in 3,539 households. The most populous of its 42 villages was Hesar, with 2,201 people.

=== Other villages in the rural district ===
- Alarj
- Besri
- Eskan
- Far
- Lanj Rud
- Mian Rud
- Nabi Dar
- Qaleh-ye Gav Godar
- Sangar
- Sar Chal
- Savarabad-e Sofla
