= Mahajeran, Markazi =

City in Markazi province, Iran

Mahajeran Persian: مهاجران
- City
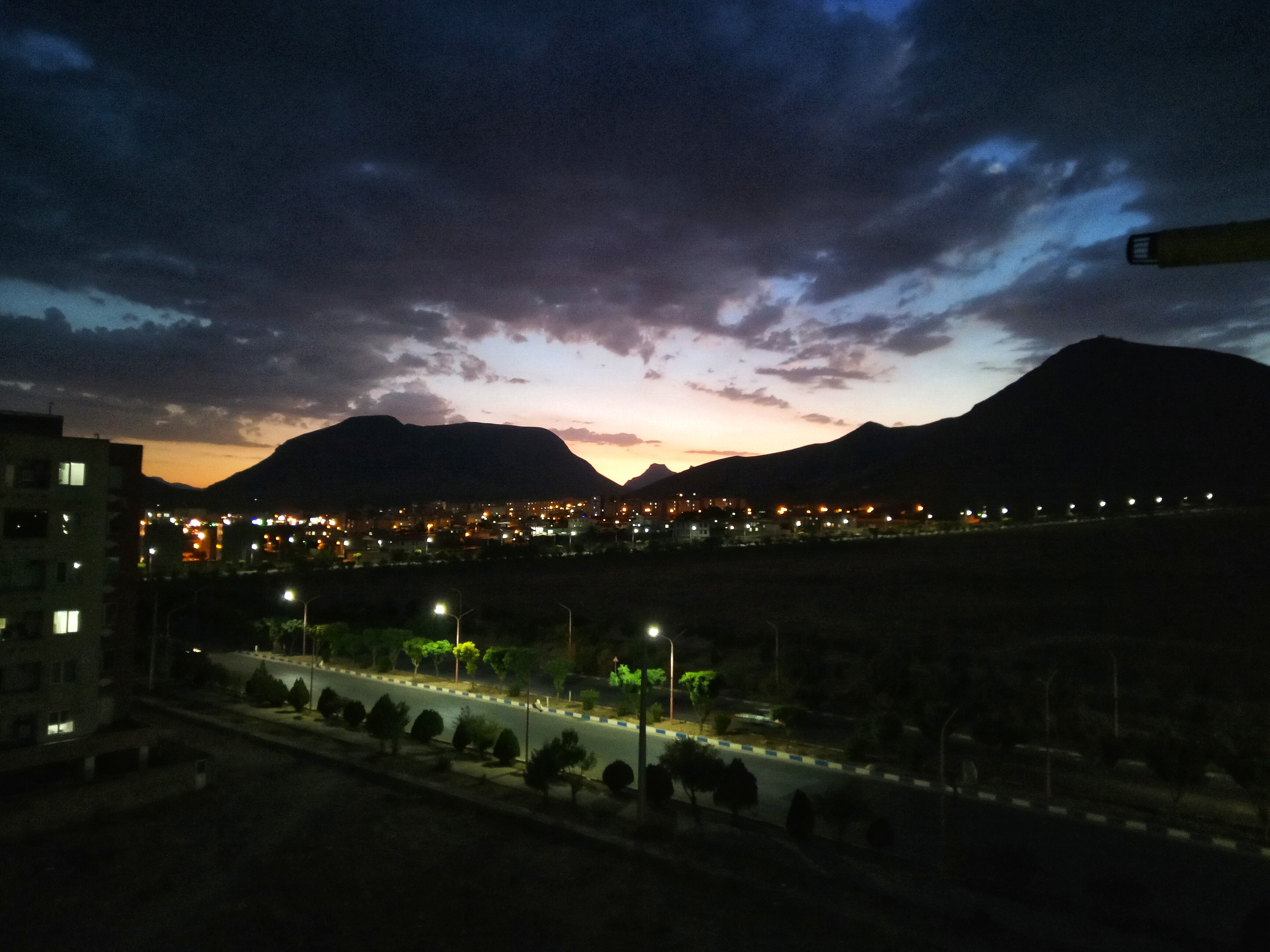
- Sunset in the city of Mahajeran

- Location within Iran
- Coordinates: 34°02′55″N 49°25′52″E
- Country: Iran
- Province: Markazi
- County: Shazand
- District: Mahajeran

Population (2016)
  - Total: 19,346
- Time zone: UTC+3:30 (IRST)

Mahajeran (Persian: مهاجران) (Note: Also romanized as Mahājerān and Mohājerān) is a city in, and the capital of, Mahajeran District in Shazand County, (Note: Formerly Sarband County) Markazi province, Iran.

== Demographics ==
=== Population ===
At the time of the 2006 National Census, Mahajeran's population was 11,109 in 2,894 households, when it was a village in Pol-e Doab Rural District of Zalian District. The following census in 2011 counted 12,293 people in 3,380 households, by which time the village had been converted to a city. The 2016 census measured the population of the city as 19,346 people in 6,155 households.

In 2024, Mahajeran was separated from the district in the formation of Mahajeran District.
