= Zand District =

District in Hamadan province, Iran

Zand District Persian: بخش زند
- District
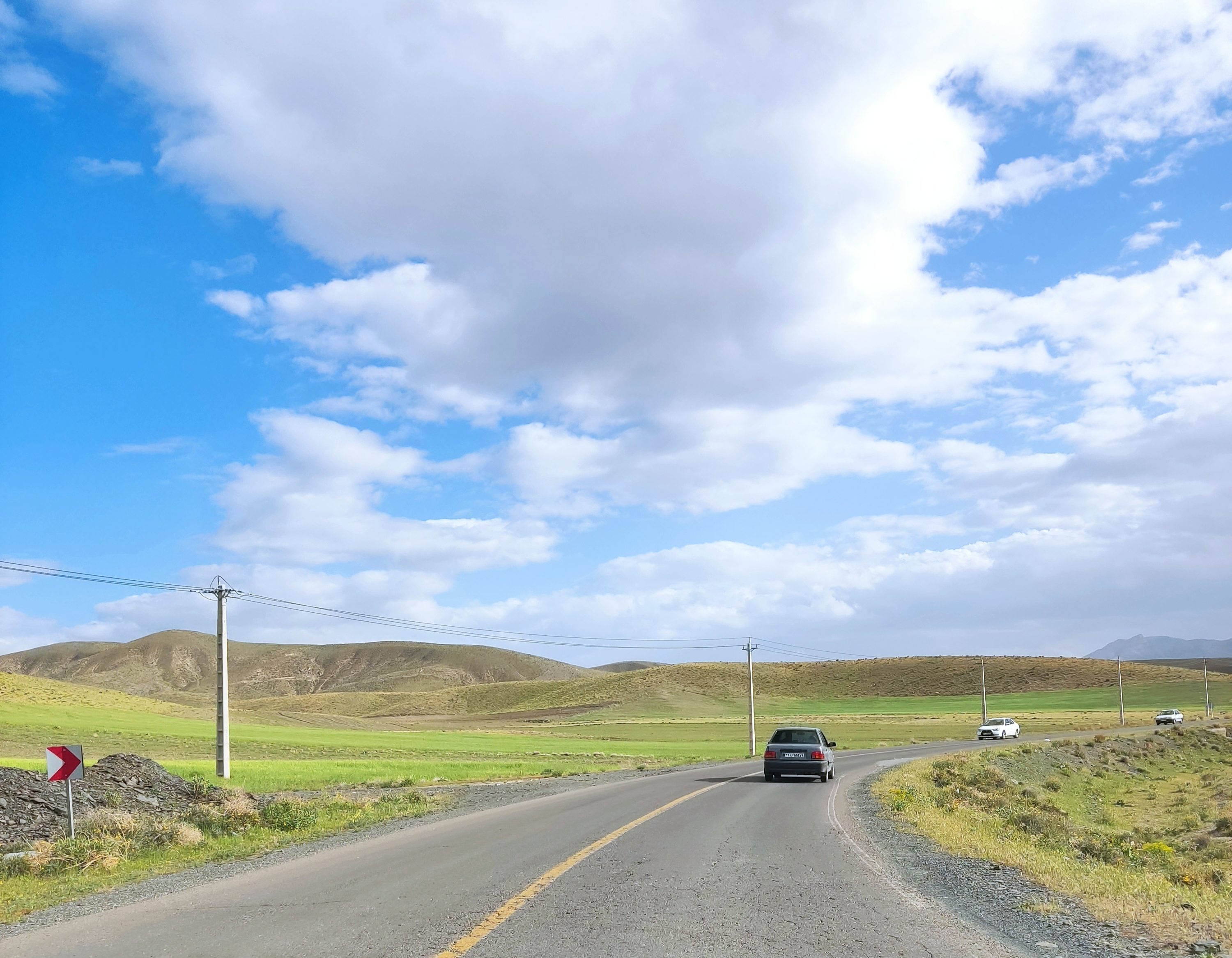
- Road in Zand District

- Location within Iran
- Coordinates: 34°08′N 48°58′E
- Country: Iran
- Province: Hamadan
- County: Malayer
- Established: 2003
- Capital: Zangeneh

Population (2016)
  - Total: 10,019
- Time zone: UTC+3:30 (IRST)

Zand District (Persian: بخش زند) is in Malayer County, Hamadan province, Iran. Its capital is the city of Zangeneh. (Note: Formerly the village of Zanganeh-ye Olya) It is the namesake of the Zand dynasty.

== Demographics ==
=== Population ===
At the time of the 2006 National Census, the district's population was 14,426 in 3,695 households. The following census in 2011 counted 12,180 people in 3,776 households. The 2016 census measured the population of the district as 10,019 inhabitants in 3,400 households.

=== Administrative divisions ===
Zand District Population
Administrative Divisions	2006	2011	2016
Kamazan-e Olya RD	4,434	3,564	2,964
Kamazan-e Sofla RD	4,985	4,405	3,776
Kamazan-e Vosta RD	4,163	3,486	2,658
Zangeneh (city)	844	725	621
Total	14,426	12,180	10,019
RD = Rural District
