= Zalian District =

District in Markazi province, Iran

Zalian District Persian: بخش زالیان
- District
- Location within Iran
- Coordinates: 34°00′57″N 49°13′28″E
- Country: Iran
- Province: Markazi
- County: Shazand
- Established: 1997
- Capital: Tureh

Population (2016)
  - Total: 43,398
- Time zone: UTC+3:30 (IRST)

Zalian District (Persian: بخش زالیان) is in Shazand County, (Note: Formerly Sarband County) Markazi province, Iran. Its capital is the city of Tureh.

== History ==
The village of Mahajeran was converted to a city in 2006. In 2024, Mahajeran and 17 villages were separated from the district in the formation of Mahajeran District.

== Demographics ==
=== Population ===
At the time of the 2006 census, the district's population was 42,665 in 11,108 households. The following census in 2011 counted 38,813 people in 11,315 households. The 2016 census measured the population of the district as 43,398 inhabitants in 13,766 households.

=== Administrative divisions ===
Zalian District Population
Administrative Divisions	2006	2011	2016
Nahr-e Mian RD (Note: Formerly Zalian Rural District)	9,741	8,945	8,245
Pol-e Doab RD	27,846	12,836	10,752
Zalian RD	2,911	2,408	1,753
Mahajeran (city) (Note: Transferred to Mahajeran District after the 2016 census)		12,293	20,346
Tureh (city)	2,167	2,331	2,302
Total	42,665	38,813	43,398
RD = Rural District
