= Varaqa =

Village in Markazi province, Iran

Varaqa Persian: ورقا
- Village
- Location within Iran
- Coordinates: 33°56′45″N 49°27′15″E
- Country: Iran
- Province: Markazi
- County: Shazand
- District: Central
- Rural District: Kazzaz

Population (2016)
  - Total: 177
- Time zone: UTC+3:30 (IRST)

Varaqa (Persian: ورقا) (Note: Also romanized as Varaqā and Varqā) is a village in Kazzaz Rural District of the Central District in Shazand County, (Note: Formerly Sarband County) Markazi province, Iran.

== Demographics ==
=== Population ===
At the time of the 2006 National Census, the village's population was 213 in 61 households, when it was in Qarah Kahriz Rural District of the Central District. The following census in 2011 counted 201 people in 64 households, by which time the rural district had been separated from the district in the formation of Qarah Kahriz District. Varaqa was transferred to Kazzaz Rural District created in the Central District. The 2016 census measured the population of the village as 177 people in 60 households.
