= Aliabad, Kazzaz =

Village in Markazi province, Iran

Aliabad Persian: علي اباد
- Village
- Location within Iran
- Coordinates: 33°59′08″N 49°26′06″E
- Country: Iran
- Province: Markazi
- County: Shazand
- District: Central
- Rural District: Kazzaz

Population (2016)
  - Total: 276
- Time zone: UTC+3:30 (IRST)

Aliabad (Persian: علي اباد) (Note: Also romanized as ‘Alīābād; also known as ‘Alīābād-e Tabārak) is a village in Kazzaz Rural District of the Central District in Shazand County, (Note: Formerly Sarband County) Markazi province, Iran.

== Demographics ==
=== Population ===
At the time of the 2006 National Census, the village's population was 296 in 77 households, when it was in Qarah Kahriz Rural District of the Central District. The following census in 2011 counted 314 people in 91 households, by which time the rural district had been separated from the district in the formation of Qarah Kahriz District. Aliabad was transferred to Kazzaz Rural District created in the Central District. The 2016 census measured the population of the village as 276 people in 89 households.
