= Jamalabad, Shazand =

Village in Markazi province, Iran

Jamalabad Persian: جمال اباد
- Village
- Location within Iran
- Coordinates: 33°58′10″N 49°26′50″E
- Country: Iran
- Province: Markazi
- County: Shazand
- District: Central
- Rural District: Kazzaz

Population (2016)
  - Total: 633
- Time zone: UTC+3:30 (IRST)

Jamalabad (Persian: جمال اباد) (Note: Also romanized as Jamālābād; also known as Chamalābād and Chamlābād) is a village in Kazzaz Rural District of the Central District in Shazand County, (Note: Formerly Sarband County) Markazi province, Iran.

== Demographics ==
=== Population ===
At the time of the 2006 National Census, the village's population was 588 in 157 households, when it was in Qarah Kahriz Rural District of the Central District. The following census in 2011 counted 667 people in 189 households, by which time the rural district had been separated from the district in the formation of Qarah Kahriz District. Aliabad was transferred to Kazzaz Rural District created in the Central District. The 2016 census measured the population of the village as 633 people in 186 households.
