= Qadamgah, Markazi =

Village in Markazi province, Iran

Qadamgah Persian: قدمگاه
- Village
- Location within Iran
- Coordinates: 33°57′58″N 49°28′12″E
- Country: Iran
- Province: Markazi
- County: Shazand
- District: Central
- Rural District: Kazzaz

Population (2016)
  - Total: 1,963
- Time zone: UTC+3:30 (IRST)

Qadamgah (Persian: قدمگاه) (Note: Also romanized as Qadamgāh; also known as Kadamga) is a village in, and the capital of, Kazzaz Rural District in the Central District of Shazand County, (Note: Formerly Sarband County) Markazi province, Iran.

== Demographics ==
=== Population ===
At the time of the 2006 National Census, the village's population was 2,012 in 592 households, when it was in Qarah Kahriz Rural District of the Central District. The following census in 2011 counted 2,126 people in 691 households, by which time the rural district had been separated from the district in the formation of Qarah Kahriz District. Qadamgah was transferred to Kazzaz Rural District created in the Central District. The 2016 census measured the population of the village as 1,963 people in 682 households, the most populous in its rural district.
