= Ghinar =

Village in Markazi province, Iran

Ghinar Persian: غينر
- Village
- Location within Iran
- Coordinates: 33°56′03″N 49°28′33″E
- Country: Iran
- Province: Markazi
- County: Shazand
- District: Central
- Rural District: Kazzaz

Population (2016)
  - Total: 1,882
- Time zone: UTC+3:30 (IRST)

Ghinar (Persian: غينر) (Note: Also romanized as Gheynar and Ghīnar; also known as ‘Eynar, Ghīnan, Kenār, and Kinār) is a village in Kazzaz Rural District of the Central District in Shazand County, (Note: Formerly Sarband County) Markazi province, Iran.

== Demographics ==
=== Population ===
At the time of the 2006 National Census, the village's population was 1,821 in 482 households, when it was in Qarah Kahriz Rural District of the Central District. The following census in 2011 counted 1,972 people in 584 households, by which time the rural district had been separated from the district in the formation of Qarah Kahriz District. Ghinar was transferred to Kazzaz Rural District created in the Central District. The 2016 census measured the population of the village as 1,882 people in 579 households.
