= Bazneh =

Neighborhood in Markazi province, Iran

Bazneh Persian: بازنه
- Neighborhood
- Location within Iran
- Coordinates: 33°52′46″N 49°32′03″E
- Country: Iran
- Province: Markazi
- County: Shazand
- District: Qarah Kahriz
- City: Shahbaz

Population (2006)
  - Total: 3,900
- Time zone: UTC+3:30 (IRST)

Bazneh (Persian: بازنه) (Note: Also romanized as Bazaneh, Bāzeneh, and Bāzneh) is a neighborhood in the city of Shahbaz in Qarah Kahriz District of Shazand County, (Note: Formerly Sarband County) Markazi province, Iran.

== Demographics ==
=== Population ===
At the time of the 2006 National Census, Bazneh's population was 3,900 in 988 households, when it was a village in Qarah Kahriz Rural District of the Central District.

In 2010, the rural district was separated from the district in the formation of Qarah Kahriz District, with Bazneh as its capital. Bazneh merged with the village of Hafteh to form the village of Hafteh and Bazneh, which was converted to a city in 2012 and renamed Shahbaz.
