= Amarat, Markazi =

Village in Markazi province, Iran

Amarat Persian: عمارت
- Village
- Location within Iran
- Coordinates: 33°51′59″N 49°34′42″E
- Country: Iran
- Province: Markazi
- County: Shazand
- District: Qarah Kahriz
- Rural District: Qarah Kahriz

Population (2016)
  - Total: 323
- Time zone: UTC+3:30 (IRST)

Amarat (Persian: عمارت) (Note: Also romanized as Amārat; also known as ‘Emārat and ‘Imarat) is a village in, and the capital of, Qarah Kahriz Rural District in Qarah Kahriz District of Shazand County, (Note: Formerly Sarband County) Markazi province, Iran. The previous capital of the rural district was the village of Hafteh, now a neighborhood in the city of Shahbaz.

== Demographics ==
=== Population ===
At the time of the 2006 National Census, the village's population was 450 in 146 households, when it was in the Central District. The following census in 2011 counted 386 people in 134 households, by which time the rural district had been separated from the district in the formation of Qarah Kahriz District. The 2016 census measured the population of the village as 323 people in 130 households.
