= Tokhmar =

Village in Markazi province, Iran

Tokhmar Persian: تخمار
- Village
- Location within Iran
- Coordinates: 33°45′48″N 49°38′40″E
- Country: Iran
- Province: Markazi
- County: Shazand
- District: Qarah Kahriz
- Rural District: Qarah Kahriz

Population (2016)
  - Total: 111
- Time zone: UTC+3:30 (IRST)

Tokhmar (Persian: تخمار) (Note: Also romanized as Tokhmār) is a village in Qarah Kahriz Rural District of Qarah Kahriz District in Shazand County, (Note: Formerly Sarband County) Markazi province, Iran.

== Demographics ==
=== Population ===
At the time of the 2006 National Census, the village's population was 93 in 31 households, when it was in Kuhsar Rural District of the Central District. The following census in 2011 counted 90 people in 31 households, by which time the rural district had been separated from the district in the formation of Qarah Kahriz District. Tokhmar was transferred to Qarah Kahriz Rural District in the same district. The 2016 census measured the population of the village as 111 people in 37 households.
