= Dehpul =

Village in Markazi province, Iran

Dehpul Persian: ده پول
- Village
- Location within Iran
- Coordinates: 33°57′08″N 49°26′45″E
- Country: Iran
- Province: Markazi
- County: Shazand
- District: Central
- Rural District: Kazzaz

Population (2016)
  - Total: 214
- Time zone: UTC+3:30 (IRST)

Dehpul (Persian: ده پول) (Note: Also romanized as Dehpūl; also known as Deh Fūl, Deh Pīl, Dehbūl, and Dehpol) is a village in Kazzaz Rural District of the Central District in Shazand County, (Note: Formerly Sarband County) Markazi province, Iran.

== Demographics ==
=== Population ===
At the time of the 2006 National Census, the village's population was 288 in 77 households, when it was in Qarah Kahriz Rural District of the Central District. The following census in 2011 counted 294 people in 91 households, by which time the rural district had been separated from the district in the formation of Qarah Kahriz District. Dehpul was transferred to Kazzaz Rural District created in the Central District. The 2016 census measured the population of the village as 214 people in 76 households.
