= Akbarabad, Shazand =

Village in Markazi province, Iran

Akbarabad Persian: اكبراباد
- Village
- Location within Iran
- Coordinates: 33°56′58″N 49°26′21″E
- Country: Iran
- Province: Markazi
- County: Shazand
- District: Central
- Rural District: Kazzaz

Population (2016)
  - Total: 1,815
- Time zone: UTC+3:30 (IRST)

Akbarabad (Persian: اكبراباد) (Note: Also romanized as Akbarābād) is a village in Kazzaz Rural District of the Central District in Shazand County, (Note: Formerly Sarband County) Markazi province, Iran.

== Demographics ==
=== Population ===
At the time of the 2006 National Census, the village's population was 1,694 in 475 households, when it was in Qarah Kahriz Rural District of the Central District. The following census in 2011 counted 1,821 people in 566 households, by which time the rural district had been separated from the district in the formation of Qarah Kahriz District. Akbarabad was transferred to Kazzaz Rural District created in the Central District. The 2016 census measured the population of the village as 1,815 people in 607 households.
