= Hafteh =

Neighborhood in Markazi province, Iran

Hafteh Persian: هفته
- Neighborhood
- Location within Iran
- Coordinates: 33°52′06″N 49°33′32″E
- Country: Iran
- Province: Markazi
- County: Shazand
- District: Qarah Kahriz
- City: Shahbaz

Population (2006)
  - Total: 2,681
- Time zone: UTC+3:30 (IRST)

Hafteh (Persian: هفته) (Note: Also known as Hafta) is a neighborhood in the city of Shahbaz in Qarah Kahriz District of Shazand County, (Note: Formerly Sarband County) Markazi province, Iran.

== Demographics ==
=== Population ===
At the time of the 2006 National Census, Hafteh's population was 2,681 in 691 households, when it was a village in, and the capital of, Qarah Kahriz Rural District in the Central District. The capital of the rural district has been transferred to the village of Amarat.

In 2010, the rural district was separated from the district in the formation of Qarah Kahriz District, with the village of Bazneh as its capital. Bazneh merged with Hafteh to form the village of Hafteh and Bazneh, which was converted to a city in 2012 and renamed Shahbaz.
