= Deh-e Ahmad =

Deh-e Ahmad or Deh Ahmad (Persian: ده احمد) may refer to:

- Deh-e Ahmad, Kohgiluyeh and Boyer-Ahmad
- Deh-e Ahmad, Markazi
- Deh-e Ahmad, Sistan and Baluchestan
