= Gurchak =

Village in Markazi province, Iran

Gurchak Persian: گورچك
- Village
- Location within Iran
- Coordinates: 33°44′24″N 49°27′35″E
- Country: Iran
- Province: Markazi
- County: Shazand
- District: Qarah Kahriz
- Rural District: Kuhsar

Population (2016)
  - Total: 93
- Time zone: UTC+3:30 (IRST)

Gurchak (Persian: گورچك) (Note: Also romanized as Gūrchak) is a village in Kuhsar Rural District of Qarah Kahriz District in Shazand County, (Note: Formerly Sarband County) Markazi province, Iran.

== Demographics ==
=== Population ===
At the time of the 2006 National Census, the village's population was 163 in 36 households, when it was in the Central District. The following census in 2011 counted 114 people in 42 households, by which time the rural district had been separated from the district in the formation of Qarah Kahriz District. The 2016 census measured the population of the village as 93 people in 34 households.
