= Qaqan =

Village in Markazi province, Iran

Qaqan Persian: قاقان
- Village
- Location within Iran
- Coordinates: 33°47′21″N 49°29′15″E
- Country: Iran
- Province: Markazi
- County: Shazand
- District: Qarah Kahriz
- Rural District: Kuhsar

Population (2016)
  - Total: 276
- Time zone: UTC+3:30 (IRST)

Qaqan (Persian: قاقان) (Note: Also romanized as Qāqān; also known as Borj Qāqān) is a village in Kuhsar Rural District of Qarah Kahriz District in Shazand County, (Note: Formerly Sarband County) Markazi province, Iran.

== Demographics ==
=== Population ===
At the time of the 2006 National Census, the village's population was 478 in 108 households, when it was in the Central District. The following census in 2011 counted 381 people in 106 households, by which time the rural district had been separated from the district in the formation of Qarah Kahriz District. The 2016 census measured the population of the village as 276 people in 97 households.
