= Ali Morad, Iran =

Ali Morad (Persian: علي مراد) in Iran may refer to:

- Ali Morad, Markazi
- Ali Morad, Sistan and Baluchestan
- Ali Morad, Yazd
