= Bagh-e Bar Aftab =

Village in Markazi province, Iran

Bagh-e Bar Aftab Persian: باغ برافتاب
- Village
- Location within Iran
- Coordinates: 33°57′16″N 49°30′06″E
- Country: Iran
- Province: Markazi
- County: Shazand
- District: Qarah Kahriz
- Rural District: Qarah Kahriz

Population (2016)
  - Total: 1,755
- Time zone: UTC+3:30 (IRST)

Bagh-e Bar Aftab (Persian: باغ برافتاب) (Note: Also romanized as Bāgh-e Bar Āftāb) is a village in Qarah Kahriz Rural District of Qarah Kahriz District in Shazand County, (Note: Formerly Sarband County) Markazi province, Iran.

== Demographics ==
=== Population ===
At the time of the 2006 National Census, the village's population was 1,556 in 393 households, when it was in the Central District. The following census in 2011 counted 1,790 people in 524 households, by which time the rural district had been separated from the district in the formation of Qarah Kahriz District. The 2016 census measured the population of the village as 1,755 people in 569 households, the most populous in its rural district.
