= Takyeh, Shazand =

Village in Markazi province, Iran

Takyeh Persian: تكيه
- Village
- Location within Iran
- Coordinates: 33°51′52″N 49°37′42″E
- Country: Iran
- Province: Markazi
- County: Shazand
- District: Qarah Kahriz
- Rural District: Qarah Kahriz

Population (2016)
  - Total: 110
- Time zone: UTC+3:30 (IRST)

Takyeh (Persian: تكيه) (Note: Also romanized as Tekyeh; also known as Takiyeh Ghareh Kariz) is a village in Qarah Kahriz Rural District of Qarah Kahriz District in Shazand County, (Note: Formerly Sarband County) Markazi province, Iran.

== Demographics ==
=== Population ===
At the time of the 2006 National Census, the village's population was 162 in 38 households, when it was in the Central District. The following census in 2011 counted 130 people in 37 households, by which time the rural district had been separated from the district in the formation of Qarah Kahriz District. The 2016 census measured the population of the village as 110 people in 37 households.
