= Qaleh-ye Pasi Jan =

Village in Markazi province, Iran

Qaleh-ye Pasi Jan Persian: قلعه پسي جان
- Village
- Location within Iran
- Coordinates: 33°51′37″N 49°34′27″E
- Country: Iran
- Province: Markazi
- County: Shazand
- District: Qarah Kahriz
- Rural District: Qarah Kahriz

Population (2016)
  - Total: 279
- Time zone: UTC+3:30 (IRST)

Qaleh-ye Pasi Jan (Persian: قلعه پسي جان) (Note: Also romanized as Qal‘eh-ye Pasī Jān and Qal‘eh-ye Pasījān; also known as Ghal‘eh Postjan, Qal‘eh Post Jān, Qal‘eh-ye Pastjān, and Qal‘eh-ye Post Jān) is a village in Qarah Kahriz Rural District of Qarah Kahriz District in Shazand County, (Note: Formerly Sarband County) Markazi province, Iran.

== Demographics ==
=== Population ===
At the time of the 2006 National Census, the village's population was 415 in 103 households, when it was in the Central District. The following census in 2011 counted 314 people in 95 households, by which time the rural district had been separated from the district in the formation of Qarah Kahriz District. The 2016 census measured the population of the village as 279 people in 97 households.
