= Lowzdar =

Lowzdar or Luzdar (Persian: لوزدر) may refer to:

- Lowzdar-e Olya
- Lowzdar-e Sofla
- Lowzdar-e Vosta
