= Dastjerdeh, Shazand =

Village in Markazi province, Iran

Dastjerdeh Persian: دستجرده
- Village
- Location within Iran
- Coordinates: 33°52′22″N 49°30′07″E
- Country: Iran
- Province: Markazi
- County: Shazand
- District: Qarah Kahriz
- Rural District: Qarah Kahriz

Population (2016)
  - Total: 717
- Time zone: UTC+3:30 (IRST)

Dastjerdeh (Persian: دستجرده) (Note: Also known as Dasgirdah, Dastgerd, Dastgerdeh, and Dastjerd) is a village in Qarah Kahriz Rural District of Qarah Kahriz District in Shazand County, (Note: Formerly Sarband County) Markazi province, Iran.

== Demographics ==
=== Population ===
At the time of the 2006 National Census, the village's population was 700 in 148 households, when it was in the Central District. The following census in 2011 counted 718 people in 185 households, by which time the rural district had been separated from the district in the formation of Qarah Kahriz District. The 2016 census measured the population of the village as 717 people in 211 households.
