= Suraneh =

Village in Markazi province, Iran

Suraneh Persian: سورانه
- Village
- Location within Iran
- Coordinates: 33°53′16″N 49°28′10″E
- Country: Iran
- Province: Markazi
- County: Shazand
- District: Central
- Rural District: Kazzaz

Population (2016)
  - Total: 594
- Time zone: UTC+3:30 (IRST)

Suraneh (Persian: سورانه) (Note: Also romanized as Sūrāneh; also known as Sīrān and Sirna) is a village in Kazzaz Rural District of the Central District in Shazand County, (Note: Formerly Sarband County) Markazi province, Iran.

== Demographics ==
=== Population ===
At the time of the 2006 National Census, the village's population was 786 in 212 households, when it was in Qarah Kahriz Rural District of the Central District. The following census in 2011 counted 716 people in 225 households, by which time the rural district had been separated from the district in the formation of Qarah Kahriz District. Suraneh was transferred to Kazzaz Rural District created in the Central District. The 2016 census measured the population of the village as 594 people in 206 households.
