= Venavi =

Village in Markazi province, Iran

Venavi Persian: وناوي
- Village
- Location within Iran
- Coordinates: 33°42′15″N 49°26′32″E
- Country: Iran
- Province: Markazi
- County: Shazand
- District: Qarah Kahriz
- Rural District: Kuhsar

Population (2016)
  - Total: 83
- Time zone: UTC+3:30 (IRST)

Venavi (Persian: وناوي) (Note: Also romanized as Vanāvī and Venāvī; also known as Vanāveh and Wināweh) is a village in Kuhsar Rural District of Qarah Kahriz District in Shazand County, (Note: Formerly Sarband County) Markazi province, Iran.

== Demographics ==
=== Population ===
At the time of the 2006 National Census, the village's population was 123 in 24 households, when it was in the Central District. The following census in 2011 counted 188 people in 57 households, by which time the rural district had been separated from the district in the formation of Qarah Kahriz District. The 2016 census measured the population of the village as 83 people in 26 households.
