= Qaleh-ye Dizijan =

Village in Markazi province, Iran

Qaleh-ye Dizijan Persian: قلعه ديزيجان
- Village
- Location within Iran
- Coordinates: 33°52′17″N 49°32′17″E
- Country: Iran
- Province: Markazi
- County: Shazand
- District: Qarah Kahriz
- Rural District: Qarah Kahriz

Population (2016)
  - Total: 272
- Time zone: UTC+3:30 (IRST)

Qaleh-ye Dizijan (Persian: قلعه ديزيجان) (Note: Also romanized as Qal‘eh Dīzī Jān and Qal‘eh-ye Dīzījān; also known as Ghal‘eh Dizijan) is a village in Qarah Kahriz Rural District of Qarah Kahriz District in Shazand County, (Note: Formerly Sarband County) Markazi province, Iran.

== Demographics ==
=== Population ===
At the time of the 2006 National Census, the village's population was 309 in 78 households, when it was in the Central District. The following census in 2011 counted 264 people in 78 households, by which time the rural district had been separated from the district in the formation of Qarah Kahriz District. The 2016 census measured the population of the village as 272 people in 107 households.
