= Hajjiabad, Shazand =

Village in Markazi province, Iran

Hajjiabad Persian: حاجي اباد
- Village
- Location within Iran
- Coordinates: 33°44′15″N 49°30′29″E
- Country: Iran
- Province: Markazi
- County: Shazand
- District: Qarah Kahriz
- Rural District: Kuhsar

Population (2016)
  - Total: 265
- Time zone: UTC+3:30 (IRST)

Hajjiabad (Persian: حاجي اباد) (Note: Also romanized as Ḩājīābād and Hājjiābād; also known as Haji Abad Japlogh) is a village in, and the capital of, Kuhsar Rural District in Qarah Kahriz District of Shazand County, (Note: Formerly Sarband County) Markazi province, Iran.

== Demographics ==
=== Population ===
At the time of the 2006 National Census, the village's population was 412 in 102 households, when it was in the Central District. The following census in 2011 counted 381 people in 104 households, by which time the rural district had been separated from the district in the formation of Qarah Kahriz District. The 2016 census measured the population of the village as 265 people in 98 households.
