= Rashan, Markazi =

Village in Markazi province, Iran

Rashan Persian: رشان
- Village
- Location within Iran
- Coordinates: 33°56′48″N 49°28′17″E
- Country: Iran
- Province: Markazi
- County: Shazand
- District: Central
- Rural District: Kazzaz

Population (2016)
  - Total: 348
- Time zone: UTC+3:30 (IRST)

Rashan (Persian: رشان) (Note: Also romanized as Rashān and Ra’shān; also known as Raqshān) is a village in Kazzaz Rural District of the Central District in Shazand County, (Note: Formerly Sarband County) Markazi province, Iran.

== Demographics ==
=== Population ===
At the time of the 2006 National Census, the village's population was 398 in 91 households, when it was in Qarah Kahriz Rural District of the Central District. The following census in 2011 counted 378 people in 106 households, by which time the rural district had been separated from the district in the formation of Qarah Kahriz District. Rashan was transferred to Kazzaz Rural District created in the Central District. The 2016 census measured the population of the village as 348 people in 104 households.
