= Zangdar =

Village in Markazi province, Iran

Zangdar Persian: زنگدر
- Village
- Location within Iran
- Coordinates: 33°43′49″N 49°32′48″E
- Country: Iran
- Province: Markazi
- County: Shazand
- District: Qarah Kahriz
- Rural District: Kuhsar

Population (2016)
  - Total: 268
- Time zone: UTC+3:30 (IRST)

Zangdar (Persian: زنگدر) (Note: Also romanized as Zangdār, Zang-e Dar, and Zang-i-Dār; also known as Zangī Dar and Zangī Darreh) is a village in Kuhsar Rural District of Qarah Kahriz District in Shazand County, (Note: Formerly Sarband County) Markazi province, Iran.

== Demographics ==
=== Population ===
At the time of the 2006 National Census, the village's population was 344 in 78 households, when it was in the Central District. The following census in 2011 counted 305 people in 87 households, by which time the rural district had been separated from the district in the formation of Qarah Kahriz District. The 2016 census measured the population of the village as 268 people in 87 households.
