= Choqa Pahneh =

Village in Markazi province, Iran

Choqa Pahneh Persian: چقاپهنه
- Village
- Location within Iran
- Coordinates: 33°43′06″N 49°28′46″E
- Country: Iran
- Province: Markazi
- County: Shazand
- District: Qarah Kahriz
- Rural District: Kuhsar

Population (2016)
  - Total: 131
- Time zone: UTC+3:30 (IRST)

Choqa Pahneh (Persian: چقاپهنه) (Note: Also romanized as Choqā Pahneh; also known as Cheqā Pahran, Cheqāh Pahneh, and Choghā Pahneh) is a village in Kuhsar Rural District of Qarah Kahriz District in Shazand County, (Note: Formerly Sarband County) Markazi province, Iran.

== Demographics ==
=== Population ===
At the time of the 2006 National Census, the village's population was 129 in 30 households, when it was in the Central District. The following census in 2011 counted 131 people in 43 households, by which time the rural district had been separated from the district in the formation of Qarah Kahriz District. The 2016 census measured the population of the village as 131 people in 38 households.
