= Muchan, Markazi =

Village in Markazi province, Iran

Muchan Persian: موچان
- Village
- Location within Iran
- Coordinates: 33°49′01″N 49°38′45″E
- Country: Iran
- Province: Markazi
- County: Shazand
- District: Qarah Kahriz
- Rural District: Qarah Kahriz

Population (2016)
  - Total: 709
- Time zone: UTC+3:30 (IRST)

Muchan (Persian: موچان) (Note: Also romanized as Moochan and Mūchān; also known as Mūchū) is a village in Qarah Kahriz Rural District of Qarah Kahriz District in Shazand County, (Note: Formerly Sarband County) Markazi province, Iran.

== Demographics ==
=== Population ===
At the time of the 2006 National Census, the village's population was 735 in 218 households, when it was in the Central District. The following census in 2011 counted 706 people in 224 households, by which time the rural district had been separated from the district in the formation of Qarah Kahriz District. The 2016 census measured the population of the village as 709 people in 249 households.
