= Sar Sakhti-ye Pain =

Village in Markazi province, Iran

Sar Sakhti-ye Pain Persian: سرسختي پائين
- Village
- Location within Iran
- Coordinates: 33°54′08″N 49°29′22″E
- Country: Iran
- Province: Markazi
- County: Shazand
- District: Central
- Rural District: Kazzaz

Population (2016)
  - Total: 1,054
- Time zone: UTC+3:30 (IRST)

Sar Sakhti-ye Pain (Persian: سرسختي پائين) (Note: Also romanized as Sar Sakhtī-ye Pā’īn; also known as Sar Sakhtī-ye Soflá, Sarsakhtī-ye Soflā, and Sarsakti) is a village in Kazzaz Rural District of the Central District in Shazand County, (Note: Formerly Sarband County) Markazi province, Iran.

== Demographics ==
=== Population ===
At the time of the 2006 National Census, the village's population was 1,170 in 278 households, when it was in Qarah Kahriz Rural District of the Central District. The following census in 2011 counted 1,233 people in 330 households, by which time the rural district had been separated from the district in the formation of Qarah Kahriz District. Sar Sakhti-ye Pain was transferred to Kazzaz Rural District created in the Central District. The 2016 census measured the population of the village as 1,054 people in 320 households.
