= Hesar-e Mohammadiyeh =

Village in Markazi province, Iran

Hesar-e Mohammadiyeh Persian: حصارمحمديه
- Village
- Location within Iran
- Coordinates: 33°51′16″N 49°32′51″E
- Country: Iran
- Province: Markazi
- County: Shazand
- District: Qarah Kahriz
- Rural District: Qarah Kahriz

Population (2016)
  - Total: 892
- Time zone: UTC+3:30 (IRST)

Hesar-e Mohammadiyeh (Persian: حصارمحمديه) (Note: Also romanized as Ḩeşār-e Moḩammadīyeh) is a village in Qarah Kahriz Rural District of Qarah Kahriz District in Shazand County, (Note: Formerly Sarband County) Markazi province, Iran.

== Demographics ==
=== Population ===
At the time of the 2006 National Census, the village's population was 1,161 in 336 households, when it was in the Central District. The following census in 2011 counted 982 people in 309 households, by which time the rural district had been separated from the district in the formation of Qarah Kahriz District. The 2016 census measured the population of the village as 892 people in 321 households.
