= Tajareh, Shazand =

Village in Markazi province, Iran

Tajareh Persian: تجره
- Village
- Location within Iran
- Coordinates: 33°52′28″N 49°31′13″E
- Country: Iran
- Province: Markazi
- County: Shazand
- District: Qarah Kahriz
- Rural District: Qarah Kahriz

Population (2016)
  - Total: 481
- Time zone: UTC+3:30 (IRST)

Tajareh (Persian: تجره) (Note: Also known as Tajra) is a village in Qarah Kahriz Rural District of Qarah Kahriz District in Shazand County, (Note: Formerly Sarband County) Markazi province, Iran.

== Demographics ==
=== Population ===
At the time of the 2006 National Census, the village's population was 603 in 165 households, when it was in the Central District. The following census in 2011 counted 606 people in 192 households, by which time the rural district had been separated from the district in the formation of Qarah Kahriz District. The 2016 census measured the population of the village as 481 people in 155 households.
