= Vasheh, Markazi =

Village in Markazi province, Iran

Vasheh Persian: واشه
- Village
- Location within Iran
- Coordinates: 33°54′14″N 49°34′49″E
- Country: Iran
- Province: Markazi
- County: Shazand
- District: Qarah Kahriz
- Rural District: Qarah Kahriz

Population (2016)
  - Total: 1,045
- Time zone: UTC+3:30 (IRST)

Vasheh (Persian: واشه) (Note: Also romanized as Vāsheh; also known as Vashā and Wāsha) is a village in Qarah Kahriz Rural District of Qarah Kahriz District in Shazand County, (Note: Formerly Sarband County) Markazi province, Iran.

== Demographics ==
=== Population ===
At the time of the 2006 National Census, the village's population was 1,000 in 252 households, when it was in the Central District. The following census in 2011 counted 1,012 people in 303 households, by which time the rural district had been separated from the district in the formation of Qarah Kahriz District. The 2016 census measured the population of the village as 1,045 people in 329 households.
