= Mahmudabad, Shazand =

Village in Markazi province, Iran

Mahmudabad Persian: محموداباد
- Village
- Location within Iran
- Coordinates: 33°43′50″N 49°29′57″E
- Country: Iran
- Province: Markazi
- County: Shazand
- District: Qarah Kahriz
- Rural District: Kuhsar

Population (2016)
  - Total: 90
- Time zone: UTC+3:30 (IRST)

Mahmudabad (Persian: محموداباد, ) (Note: Also romanized as Maḩmūdābād) is a village in Kuhsar Rural District of Qarah Kahriz District in Shazand County, (Note: Formerly Sarband County) Markazi province, Iran.

== Demographics ==
=== Population ===
At the time of the 2006 National Census, the village's population was 117 in 27 households, when it was in the Central District. The following census in 2011 counted 96 people in 31 households, by which time the rural district had been separated from the district in the formation of Qarah Kahriz District. The 2016 census measured the population of the village as 90 people in 31 households.
