= Rowghani, Markazi =

Village in Markazi province, Iran

Rowghani Persian: روغني
- Village
- Location within Iran
- Coordinates: 33°45′07″N 49°34′16″E
- Country: Iran
- Province: Markazi
- County: Shazand
- District: Qarah Kahriz
- Rural District: Kuhsar

Population (2016)
  - Total: 264
- Time zone: UTC+3:30 (IRST)

Rowghani (Persian: روغني) (Note: Also romanized as Rowghanī; also known as Roghāniyeh and Rowqānīyeh) is a village in Kuhsar Rural District of Qarah Kahriz District in Shazand County, (Note: Formerly Sarband County) Markazi province, Iran.

== Demographics ==
=== Population ===
At the time of the 2006 National Census, the village's population was 430 in 94 households, when it was in the Central District. The following census in 2011 counted 301 people in 87 households, by which time the rural district had been separated from the district in the formation of Qarah Kahriz District. The 2016 census measured the population of the village as 264 people in 86 households.
