= Hoseynabad, Shazand =

Village in Markazi province, Iran

Hoseynabad Persian: حسين اباد
- Village
- Location within Iran
- Coordinates: 33°42′13″N 49°30′28″E
- Country: Iran
- Province: Markazi
- County: Shazand
- District: Qarah Kahriz
- Rural District: Kuhsar

Population (2016)
  - Total: 400
- Time zone: UTC+3:30 (IRST)

Hoseynabad (Persian: حسين اباد) (Note: Also romanized as Hosein Abad and Ḩoseynābād) is a village in Kuhsar Rural District of Qarah Kahriz District in Shazand County, (Note: Formerly Sarband County) Markazi province, Iran.

== Demographics ==
=== Population ===
At the time of the 2006 National Census, the village's population was 482 in 112 households, when it was in the Central District. The following census in 2011 counted 411 people in 128 households, by which time the rural district had been separated from the district in the formation of Qarah Kahriz District. The 2016 census measured the population of the village as 400 people in 133 households, the most populous in its rural district.
