= Kerk, Markazi =

Village in Markazi province, Iran

Kerk Persian: كرك
- Village
- Location within Iran
- Coordinates: 33°50′53″N 49°35′14″E
- Country: Iran
- Province: Markazi
- County: Shazand
- District: Qarah Kahriz
- Rural District: Qarah Kahriz

Population (2016)
  - Total: 488
- Time zone: UTC+3:30 (IRST)

Kerk (Persian: كرك) is a village in Qarah Kahriz Rural District of Qarah Kahriz District in Shazand County, (Note: Formerly Sarband County) Markazi province, Iran.

== Demographics ==
=== Population ===
At the time of the 2006 National Census, the village's population was 620 in 163 households, when it was in the Central District. The following census in 2011 counted 582 people in 183 households, by which time the rural district had been separated from the district in the formation of Qarah Kahriz District. The 2016 census measured the population of the village as 488 people in 169 households.
