= Jalalabad, Shazand =

Village in Markazi province, Iran

Jalalabad Persian: جلال اباد
- Village
- Location within Iran
- Coordinates: 33°44′30″N 49°34′32″E
- Country: Iran
- Province: Markazi
- County: Shazand
- District: Qarah Kahriz
- Rural District: Kuhsar

Population (2016)
  - Total: 32
- Time zone: UTC+3:30 (IRST)

Jalalabad (Persian: جلال اباد) (Note: Also romanized as Jalālābād) is a village in Kuhsar Rural District of Qarah Kahriz District in Shazand County, (Note: Formerly Sarband County) Markazi province, Iran.

== Demographics ==
=== Population ===
At the time of the 2006 National Census, the village's population was 71 in 16 households, when it was in the Central District. The following census in 2011 counted 55 people in 13 households, by which time the rural district had been separated from the district in the formation of Qarah Kahriz District. The 2016 census measured the population of the village as 32 people in 11 households.
