= Anbarteh =

Village in Markazi province, Iran

Anbarteh Persian: عنبرته
- Village
- Location within Iran
- Coordinates: 33°50′57″N 49°31′38″E
- Country: Iran
- Province: Markazi
- County: Shazand
- District: Qarah Kahriz
- Rural District: Qarah Kahriz

Population (2016)
  - Total: 812
- Time zone: UTC+3:30 (IRST)

Anbarteh (Persian: عنبرته) (Note: Also romanized as ‘Anbar Tah and ‘Anbarteh) is a village in Qarah Kahriz Rural District of Qarah Kahriz District in Shazand County, (Note: Formerly Sarband County) Markazi province, Iran.

== Demographics ==
=== Population ===
At the time of the 2006 National Census, the village's population was 823 in 213 households, when it was in the Central District. The following census in 2011 counted 805 people in 223 households, by which time the rural district had been separated from the district in the formation of Qarah Kahriz District. The 2016 census measured the population of the village as 812 people in 257 households.
