= Ab Barik, Markazi =

Village in Markazi province, Iran

Ab Barik Persian: ابباريك
- Village
- Location within Iran
- Coordinates: 33°48′24″N 49°38′12″E
- Country: Iran
- Province: Markazi
- County: Shazand
- District: Qarah Kahriz
- Rural District: Qarah Kahriz

Population (2016)
  - Total: 229
- Time zone: UTC+3:30 (IRST)

Ab Barik (Persian: ابباريك) (Note: Also romanized as Āb Bārīk and Āb-e Bārīk) is a village in Qarah Kahriz Rural District of Qarah Kahriz District in Shazand County, (Note: Formerly Sarband County) Markazi province, Iran.

== Demographics ==
=== Population ===
At the time of the 2006 National Census, the village's population was 291 in 91 households, when it was in the Central District. The following census in 2011 counted 205 people in 70 households, by which time the rural district had been separated from the district in the formation of Qarah Kahriz District. The 2016 census measured the population of the village as 229 people in 81 households.
