= Qaleh-ye Khan =

Qaleh-ye Khan or Qaleh Khan or Qaleh-i-Khan (Persian: قلعه خان) may refer to:

- Qaleh Khan, Hamadan
- Qaleh Khan, Kerman (Qaleh Ganj County)
- Qaleh-ye Khan, Kerman (Narmashir County)
- Qaleh-ye Khan, Khuzestan
- Qaleh Khan, Markazi
- Qaleh Khan, North Khorasan
- Qaleh-ye Khan, Yazd
