= Gaztaf-e Olya =

Gaztaf-e Olya گزطاف عليا
- Village
- Location within Iran
- Coordinates: 33°39′48″N 49°13′06″E
- Country: Iran
- Province: Markazi
- County: Shazand
- Bakhsh: Sarband
- Rural District: Hendudar

Population (2006)
  - Total: 83
- Time zone: UTC+3:30 (IRST)
  - Summer (DST): UTC+4:30 (IRDT)

Gaztaf-e Olya (Persian: گزطاف عليا, also Romanized as Gazţāf-e ‘Olyā; also known as Gazāb, Gaz Şāf-e ‘Olyā, and Gazţāf-e Bālā) is a village in Hendudar Rural District, Sarband District, Shazand County, Markazi Province, Iran. At the 2006 census, its population was 83, in 15 families.
