= Hakk =

Hakk (Persian: حك) may refer to:

- Hakk-e Olya, a village in Markazi Province, Iran
- Hakk-e Sofla, a village in Markazi Province, Iran

== See also ==
- Haqq
