= Ziaabad, Shazand =

Village in Markazi province, Iran

Ziaabad Persian: ضيااباد
- Village
- Location within Iran
- Coordinates: 33°47′23″N 49°23′36″E
- Country: Iran
- Province: Markazi
- County: Shazand
- District: Central
- Rural District: Astaneh

Population (2016)
  - Total: 379
- Time zone: UTC+3:30 (IRST)

Ziaabad (Persian: ضيااباد) (Note: Also romanized as Ẕīā’ābād and Ẕīāābād; also known as Deh Sefīd) is a village in Astaneh Rural District of the Central District in Shazand County, (Note: Formerly Sarband County) Markazi province, Iran.

== Demographics ==
=== Population ===
At the time of the 2006 National Census, the village's population was 621 in 141 households. The following census in 2011 counted 458 people in 148 households. At the 2016 census, the village population was 379 people in 139 households.
