= Khana Darreh =

Khana Darreh or Khena Darreh (Persian: خنا دره) may refer to:

- Khana Darreh-ye Olya
- Khana Darreh-ye Sofla
