= Khana Darreh-ye Olya =

Khana Darreh-ye Olya خنا دره عليا
- Village
- Location within Iran
- Coordinates: 33°45′35″N 49°11′01″E
- Country: Iran
- Province: Markazi
- County: Shazand
- Bakhsh: Sarband
- Rural District: Hendudar

Population (2006)
  - Total: 143
- Time zone: UTC+3:30 (IRST)
  - Summer (DST): UTC+4:30 (IRDT)

Khana Darreh-ye Olya (Persian: خنا دره عليا, also Romanized as Khanā Darreh-ye ‘Olyā, Khenā Darreh ‘Olyā, and Khenā Darreh-ye ‘Olyā; also known as Khenā Darreh Bālā and Khenā Darreh-ye Bālā) is a village in Hendudar Rural District, Sarband District, Shazand County, Markazi Province, Iran. At the 2006 census, its population was 143, in 42 families.
