= Kazzaz =

Village in Markazi province, Iran

Kazzaz Persian: كزاز
- Village
- Location within Iran
- Coordinates: 34°00′12″N 49°25′13″E
- Country: Iran
- Province: Markazi
- County: Shazand
- District: Central
- Rural District: Kazzaz

Population (2016)
  - Total: 1,908
- Time zone: UTC+3:30 (IRST)

Kazzaz (Persian: كزاز) (Note: Also romanized as Kazzāz; also known as Kazāz-e Soflá, Kazāz Pā’īn, and Kazzāz-e Pā’īn) is a village in Kazzaz Rural District of the Central District in Shazand County, (Note: Formerly Sarband County) Markazi province, Iran.

== Demographics ==
=== Population ===
At the time of the 2006 National Census, the village's population was 2,148 in 536 households, when it was in Pol-e Doab Rural District of Zalian District. The following census in 2011 counted 2,232 people in 658 households, by which time the village had been transferred to Kazzaz Rural District created in the Central District. The 2016 census measured the population of the village as 1,908 people in 609 households.
