= Nurabad, Shazand =

Village in Markazi province, Iran

Nurabad Persian: نوراباد
- Village
- Location within Iran
- Coordinates: 33°47′39″N 49°25′11″E
- Country: Iran
- Province: Markazi
- County: Shazand
- District: Central
- Rural District: Astaneh

Population (2016)
  - Total: 254
- Time zone: UTC+3:30 (IRST)

Nurabad (Persian: نوراباد) (Note: Also romanized as Nūrābād) is a village in Astaneh Rural District of the Central District in Shazand County, (Note: Formerly Sarband County) Markazi province, Iran.

== Demographics ==
=== Population ===
At the time of the 2006 National Census, the village's population was 438 in 116 households. The following census in 2011 counted 294 people in 118 households. At the 2016 census, the village population was 254 people in 101 households.
