= Niazagheh =

Village in Markazi province, Iran

Niazagheh Persian: نيازاغه
- Village
- Location within Iran
- Coordinates: 33°51′32″N 49°01′45″E
- Country: Iran
- Province: Markazi
- County: Shazand
- District: Sarband
- Rural District: Malmir

Population (2016)
  - Total: 133
- Time zone: UTC+3:30 (IRST)

Niazagheh (Persian: نيازاغه) (Note: Also romanized as Nīāzāgheh; also known as Niāz Agha, Nīāz Āqā, and Nīāz Zāgheh) is a village in Malmir Rural District of Sarband District (Note: Formerly Hendudar District) in Shazand County, (Note: Formerly Sarband County) Markazi province, Iran.

== Demographics ==
=== Population ===
At the time of the 2006 National Census, the village's population was 193 in 37 households. The following census in 2011 counted 154 people in 39 households. The 2016 census measured the population of the village as 133 people in 45 households.
