= Lowzdar-e Vosta =

Lowzdar-e Vosta لوزدروسطي
- Village
- Location within Iran
- Coordinates: 33°42′01″N 49°18′05″E
- Country: Iran
- Province: Markazi
- County: Shazand
- Bakhsh: Sarband
- Rural District: Hendudar

Population (2006)
  - Total: 69
- Time zone: UTC+3:30 (IRST)
  - Summer (DST): UTC+4:30 (IRDT)

Lowzdar-e Vosta (Persian: لوزدروسطي, also Romanized as Lowzdar-e Vosţá and Lowzdar-e Vasaţī; also known as Lowzdar-e Vasaţ and Lūz-e Vosţá) is a village in Hendudar Rural District, Sarband District, Shazand County, Markazi Province, Iran. At the 2006 census, its population was 69, in 21 families.
