= Gaztaf =

Gaztaf (Persian: گزطاف), also rendered as Gaz Saf, may refer to:

- Gaztaf-e Olya
- Gaztaf-e Sofla
