= Deh-e Ali Morad =

Deh-e Ali Morad or Deh Ali Morad (Persian: ده علي مراد), also rendered as Deh Ali Murad, may refer to:

- Deh-e Ali Morad, Markazi
- Deh-e Ali Morad, Sistan and Baluchestan
