= Khana Darreh-ye Sofla =

Khana Darreh-ye Sofla خنا دره سفلي
- Village
- Location within Iran
- Coordinates: 33°45′15″N 49°12′34″E
- Country: Iran
- Province: Markazi
- County: Shazand
- Bakhsh: Sarband
- Rural District: Hendudar

Population (2006)
  - Total: 118
- Time zone: UTC+3:30 (IRST)
  - Summer (DST): UTC+4:30 (IRDT)

Khana Darreh-ye Sofla (Persian: خنا دره سفلي, also Romanized as Khanā Darreh-ye Soflá and Khenā Darreh-ye Soflá; also known as Khenadarah, Khenā Darreh Pā’īn, and Khenā Darreh-ye Pā’īn) is a village in Hendudar Rural District, Sarband District, Shazand County, Markazi Province, Iran. At the 2006 census, its population was 118, in 30 families.
