= Cheshmeh-ye Sar =

Village in Markazi province, Iran

Cheshmeh-ye Sar Persian: چشمه سار
- Village
- Location within Iran
- Coordinates: 33°58′55″N 49°22′40″E
- Country: Iran
- Province: Markazi
- County: Shazand
- District: Central
- Rural District: Kazzaz

Population (2016)
  - Total: 242
- Time zone: UTC+3:30 (IRST)

Cheshmeh-ye Sar (Persian: چشمه سار) (Note: Also romanized as Cheshmeh-ye Sār) is a village in Kazzaz Rural District of the Central District in Shazand County, (Note: Formerly Sarband County) Markazi province, Iran.

== Demographics ==
=== Population ===
At the time of the 2006 National Census, the village's population was 294 in 71 households, when it was in Pol-e Doab Rural District of Zalian District. The following census in 2011 counted 252 people in 71 households, by which time the village had been transferred to Kazzaz Rural District created in the Central District. The 2016 census measured the population of the village as 242 people in 78 households.
