= Khoshkehdar-e Malmir =

Village in Markazi province, Iran

Khoshkehdar-e Malmir Persian: خشكه درمالمير
- Village
- Location within Iran
- Coordinates: 33°47′35″N 49°06′09″E
- Country: Iran
- Province: Markazi
- County: Shazand
- District: Sarband
- Rural District: Malmir

Population (2016)
  - Total: 132
- Time zone: UTC+3:30 (IRST)

Khoshkehdar-e Malmir (Persian: خشكه درمالمير) (Note: Also romanized as Khoshkehdar-e Mālmīr; also known as Khoshgehdar, Khoshkdar-e Bālā, Khoshkeh Dar, and Khoshkehdar) is a village in Malmir Rural District of Sarband District (Note: Formerly Hendudar District) in Shazand County, (Note: Formerly Sarband County) Markazi province, Iran.

== Demographics ==
=== Population ===
At the time of the 2006 National Census, the village's population was 205 in 53 households. The following census in 2011 counted 125 people in 37 households. The 2016 census measured the population of the village as 132 people in 43 households.
