= Borj, Markazi =

Village in Markazi province, Iran

Borj Persian: برج
- Village
- Location within Iran
- Coordinates: 33°48′23″N 49°25′05″E
- Country: Iran
- Province: Markazi
- County: Shazand
- District: Central
- Rural District: Astaneh

Population (2016)
  - Total: 178
- Time zone: UTC+3:30 (IRST)

Borj (Persian: برج) is a village in Astaneh Rural District of the Central District in Shazand County, (Note: Formerly Sarband County) Markazi province, Iran.

== Demographics ==
=== Population ===
At the time of the 2006 National Census, the village's population was 203 in 50 households. The following census in 2011 counted 198 people in 60 households. At the 2016 census, the village population was 178 people in 60 households.
