= Zahirabad-e Astaneh =

Village in Markazi province, Iran

Zahirabad-e Astaneh Persian: ظهيراباداستانه
- Village
- Location within Iran
- Coordinates: 33°53′37″N 49°16′38″E
- Country: Iran
- Province: Markazi
- County: Shazand
- District: Central
- Rural District: Astaneh

Population (2016)
  - Total: 781
- Time zone: UTC+3:30 (IRST)

Zahirabad-e Astaneh (Persian: ظهيرآباد آستانه) (Note: Also romanized as Z̧ahīrābād-e Āstāneh; also known as Z̧ahīrābād, Zarābād, Zīrābād, Z̧ohrābād, and Z̧ohrābād-e Āstāneh) is a village in Astaneh Rural District of the Central District in Shazand County, (Note: Formerly Sarband County) Markazi province, Iran.

== Demographics ==
=== Population ===
At the time of the 2006 National Census, the village's population was 1,001 in 203 households. The following census in 2011 counted 988 people in 231 households. At the 2016 census, the village population was 781 people in 243 households.
