= Talkhestan =

Talkhestan (Persian: تلخستان) may refer to:

- Talkhestan, Kermanshah
- Talkhestan, Markazi
