= Hajji Beyg =

Village in Markazi province, Iran

Hajji Beyg Persian: حاجي بيگ
- Village
- Location within Iran
- Coordinates: 33°50′11″N 49°05′37″E
- Country: Iran
- Province: Markazi
- County: Shazand
- District: Sarband
- Rural District: Malmir

Population (2016)
  - Total: 173
- Time zone: UTC+3:30 (IRST)

Hajji Beyg (Persian: حاجي بيگ) (Note: Also romanized as Ḩājī Beyg and Ḩājjī Beyg; also known as Hāji Bāgh, Ḩājjī Bāgh, and Ḩājjī Beyk) is a village in Malmir Rural District of Sarband District (Note: Formerly Hendudar District) in Shazand County, (Note: Formerly Sarband County) Markazi province, Iran.

== Demographics ==
=== Population ===
At the time of the 2006 National Census, the village's population was 340 in 78 households. The following census in 2011 counted 244 people in 76 households. The 2016 census measured the population of the village as 173 people in 67 households.
