= Chenas =

Village in Markazi province, Iran

Chenas Persian: چناس
- Village
- Location within Iran
- Coordinates: 33°49′21″N 49°35′54″E
- Country: Iran
- Province: Markazi
- County: Shazand
- District: Qarah Kahriz
- Rural District: Qarah Kahriz

Population (2016)
  - Total: 253
- Time zone: UTC+3:30 (IRST)

Chenas (Persian: چناس) (Note: Also romanized as Chanas, Chenās, and Chonās; also known as Chūnās) is a village in Qarah Kahriz Rural District of Qarah Kahriz District in Shazand County, (Note: Formerly Sarband County) Markazi province, Iran.

== Demographics ==
=== Population ===
At the time of the 2006 National Census, the village's population was 352 in 92 households, when it was in the Central District. The following census in 2011 counted 313 people in 101 households, by which time the rural district had been separated from the district in the formation of Qarah Kahriz District. The 2016 census measured the population of the village as 253 people in 97 households.
