= Palang Dar =

Village in Markazi province, Iran

Palang Dar Persian: پلنگدر
- Village
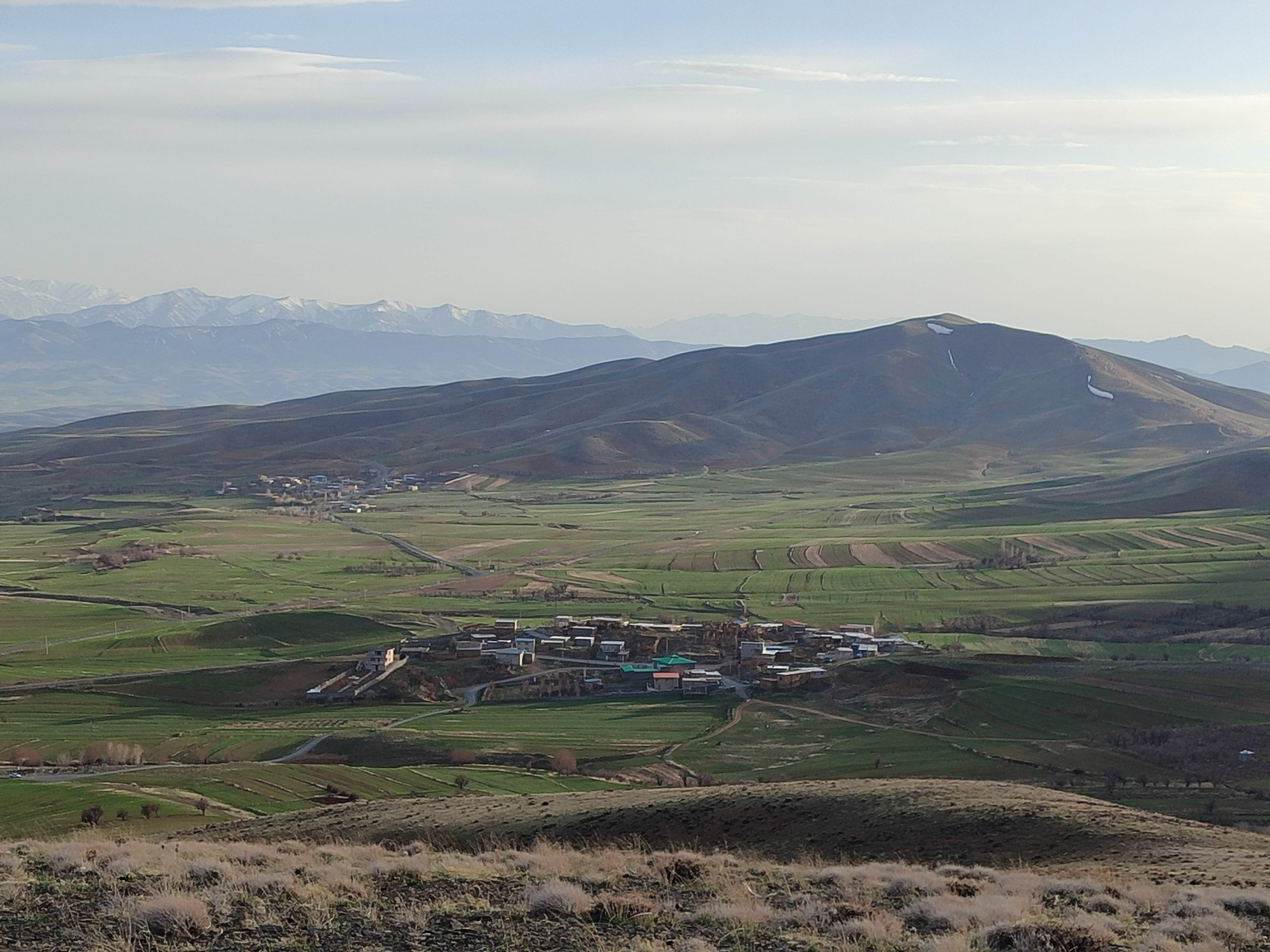

- Location within Iran
- Coordinates: 33°45′26″N 49°22′47″E
- Country: Iran
- Province: Markazi
- County: Shazand
- District: Central
- Rural District: Astaneh

Population (2016)
  - Total: 72
- Time zone: UTC+3:30 (IRST)

Palang Dar (Persian: پلنگدر) (Note: Also known as Palankdar) is a village in Astaneh Rural District of the Central District in Shazand County, (Note: Formerly Sarband County) Markazi province, Iran.

== Demographics ==
=== Population ===
At the time of the 2006 National Census, the village's population was 172 in 33 households. The following census in 2011 counted 95 people in 29 households. At the 2016 census, the village population was 72 people in 30 households.
