= Gaztaf-e Sofla =

Gaztaf-e Sofla گزطاف سفلي
- Village
- Location within Iran
- Coordinates: 33°39′16″N 49°12′51″E
- Country: Iran
- Province: Markazi
- County: Shazand
- Bakhsh: Sarband
- Rural District: Hendudar

Population (2006)
  - Total: 16
- Time zone: UTC+3:30 (IRST)
  - Summer (DST): UTC+4:30 (IRDT)

Gaztaf-e Sofla (Persian: گزطاف سفلي, also Romanized as Gazţāf-e Soflá; also known as Gaz Şāf-e Soflá and Gazţāf-e Pā’īn) is a village in Hendudar Rural District, Sarband District, Shazand County, Markazi Province, Iran. At the 2006 census, its population was 16, in 4 families.
