= Alborz, Markazi =

Village in Markazi province, Iran

Alborz Persian: البرز
- Village
- Location within Iran
- Coordinates: 34°00′17″N 49°23′26″E
- Country: Iran
- Province: Markazi
- County: Shazand
- District: Central
- Rural District: Kazzaz

Population (2016)
  - Total: 147
- Time zone: UTC+3:30 (IRST)

Alborz (Persian: البرز) (Note: Also known as Alburz) is a village in Kazzaz Rural District of the Central District in Shazand County, (Note: Formerly Sarband County) Markazi province, Iran.

== Demographics ==
=== Population ===
At the time of the 2006 National Census, the village's population was 198 in 68 households, when it was in Pol-e Doab Rural District of Zalian District. The following census in 2011 counted 168 people in 62 households, by which time the village had been transferred to Kazzaz Rural District created in the Central District. The 2016 census measured the population of the village as 147 people in 52 households.
