= Pakal, Markazi =

Village in Markazi province, Iran

Pakal Persian: پاكل
- Village
- Location within Iran
- Coordinates: 33°48′59″N 49°20′14″E
- Country: Iran
- Province: Markazi
- County: Shazand
- District: Central
- Rural District: Astaneh

Population (2016)
  - Total: 499
- Time zone: UTC+3:30 (IRST)

Pakal (Persian: پاكل) (Note: Also romanized as Pākal; also known as Bākal) is a village in Astaneh Rural District of the Central District in Shazand County, (Note: Formerly Sarband County) Markazi province, Iran.

== Demographics ==
=== Population ===
At the time of the 2006 National Census, the village's population was 721 in 224 households. The following census in 2011 counted 627 people in 228 households. At the 2016 census, the village population was 499 people in 207 households.
