= Mahmudabad, Sarband =

Mahmudabad محموداباد
- Village
- Location within Iran
- Coordinates: 33°42′34″N 49°20′41″E
- Country: Iran
- Province: Markazi
- County: Shazand
- Bakhsh: Sarband
- Rural District: Hendudar

Population (2006)
  - Total: 74
- Time zone: UTC+3:30 (IRST)
  - Summer (DST): UTC+4:30 (IRDT)

Mahmudabad (Persian: محموداباد, also Romanized as Maḩmūdābād; also known as Bīāb, Maḩmūdābād-e Bīāb, and Maḩmūdābād-e Bī Āb) is a village in Hendudar Rural District, Sarband District, Shazand County, Markazi Province, Iran. At the 2006 census, its population was 74, in 16 families.
