= Qaleh-ye Baleman =

Village in Markazi province, Iran

Qaleh-ye Baleman Persian: قلعه بالمان
- Village
- Location within Iran
- Coordinates: 33°53′29″N 49°20′15″E
- Country: Iran
- Province: Markazi
- County: Shazand
- District: Central
- Rural District: Astaneh

Population (2016)
  - Total: 435
- Time zone: UTC+3:30 (IRST)

Qaleh-ye Baleman (Persian: قلعه بالمان) (Note: Also romanized as Qal‘eh Bālmān, Qal‘eh-ye Bālemān, and Qal‘eh-ye Bālmān; also known as Bālāman and Bālemān) is a village in Astaneh Rural District of the Central District in Shazand County, (Note: Formerly Sarband County) Markazi province, Iran.

== Demographics ==
=== Population ===
At the time of the 2006 National Census, the village's population was 489 in 129 households. The following census in 2011 counted 491 people in 148 households. At the 2016 census, the village population was 435 people in 148 households.
