= Gol-e Zard-e Abdi =

Village in Markazi province, Iran

Gol-e Zard-e Abdi Persian: گل زردعبدي
- Village
- Location within Iran
- Coordinates: 33°49′38″N 49°00′23″E
- Country: Iran
- Province: Markazi
- County: Shazand
- District: Sarband
- Rural District: Malmir

Population (2016)
  - Total: 217
- Time zone: UTC+3:30 (IRST)

Gol-e Zard-e Abdi (Persian: گل زردعبدي) (Note: Also romanized as Gol-e Zard-e ‘Abdī and Golzard-e ‘Abdī; also known as Gol-e Zard and Qol-e Zard) is a village in Malmir Rural District of Sarband District (Note: Formerly Hendudar District) in Shazand County, (Note: Formerly Sarband County) Markazi province, Iran.

== Demographics ==
=== Population ===
At the time of the 2006 National Census, the village's population was 427 in 117 households. The following census in 2011 counted 342 people in 102 households. The 2016 census measured the population of the village as 217 people in 84 households.
