= Ali-ye Qurchi =

Village in Markazi province, Iran

Ali-ye Qurchi Persian: علي قورچي
- Village
- Location within Iran
- Coordinates: 33°48′46″N 49°16′29″E
- Country: Iran
- Province: Markazi
- County: Shazand
- District: Sarband
- Rural District: Hendudar

Population (2016)
  - Total: 215
- Time zone: UTC+3:30 (IRST)

Ali-ye Qurchi (Persian: علي قورچي) (Note: Also romanized as ‘Alī Qowrchī, ‘Alī Qūrchī, and ‘Alī-ye Qūrchī) is a village in Hendudar Rural District (Note: Formerly Sarband Rural District) of Sarband District (Note: Formerly Hendudar District) in Shazand County, (Note: Formerly Sarband County) Markazi province, Iran.

== Demographics ==
=== Population ===
At the time of the 2006 National Census, the village's population was 337 in 76 households. The following census in 2011 counted 222 people in 68 households. The 2016 census measured the population of the village as 215 people in 69 households.
