= Sar Sakhti =

Sar Sakhti or Sarsakhti (Persian: سرسختي) may refer to:

- Sar Sakhti-ye Bala
- Sar Sakhti-ye Pain
