= Qaidan, Markazi =

Village in Markazi province, Iran

Qaidan Persian: قاييدان
- Village
- Location within Iran
- Coordinates: 33°46′29″N 49°15′32″E
- Country: Iran
- Province: Markazi
- County: Shazand
- District: Sarband
- Rural District: Hendudar

Population (2016)
  - Total: 250
- Time zone: UTC+3:30 (IRST)

Qaidan (Persian: قاييدان) (Note: Also romanized as Qā’īdān and Qāyedān) is a village in Hendudar Rural District (Note: Formerly Sarband Rural District) of Sarband District (Note: Formerly Hendudar District) in Shazand County, (Note: Formerly Sarband County) Markazi province, Iran.

== Demographics ==
=== Population ===
At the time of the 2006 National Census, the village's population was 423 in 85 households. The following census in 2011 counted 315 people in 81 households. The 2016 census measured the population of the village as 250 people in 75 households.
