= Kohneh Hesar, Markazi =

Village in Markazi province, Iran

Kohneh Hesar Persian: كهنه حصار
- Village
- Location within Iran
- Country: Iran
- Province: Markazi
- County: Shazand
- District: Sarband
- Rural District: Hendudar

Population (2016)
  - Total: 303
- Time zone: UTC+3:30 (IRST)

Kohneh Hesar (Persian: كهنه حصار) (Note: Also romanized as Kohneh Ḩeşār) is a village in Hendudar Rural District (Note: Formerly Sarband Rural District) of Sarband District (Note: Formerly Hendudar District) in Shazand County, (Note: Formerly Sarband County) Markazi province, Iran.

== Demographics ==
=== Population ===
At the time of the 2006 National Census, the village's population was 419 in 83 households. The following census in 2011 counted 349 people in 92 households. The 2016 census measured the population of the village as 303 people in 85 households.
