= Vezmestan-e Olya =

Vezmestan-e Olya وزمستان عليا
- Village
- Location within Iran
- Coordinates: 33°44′04″N 49°10′30″E
- Country: Iran
- Province: Markazi
- County: Shazand
- Bakhsh: Sarband
- Rural District: Hendudar

Population (2006)
  - Total: 167
- Time zone: UTC+3:30 (IRST)
  - Summer (DST): UTC+4:30 (IRDT)

Vezmestan-e Olya (Persian: وزمستان عليا, also Romanized as Vezmestān-e ‘Olyā; also known as Vazmestān, Vezmestān, and Wazmistān) is a village in Hendudar Rural District, Sarband District, Shazand County, Markazi Province, Iran. At the 2006 census, its population was 167, in 50 families.
