= Tavan =

Tavan or Tovan (Persian: توان) may refer to:

- Tavan, Qazvin
- Tavan, West Azerbaijan
- Alphonse Tavan (1833–1905), French Provençal poet

== See also ==
- Tavan Dasht (disambiguation)
