= Lowzdar-e Sofla =

Lowzdar-e Sofla لوزدرسفلي
- Village
- Location within Iran
- Coordinates: 33°40′39″N 49°16′54″E
- Country: Iran
- Province: Markazi
- County: Shazand
- Bakhsh: Sarband
- Rural District: Hendudar

Population (2006)
  - Total: 25
- Time zone: UTC+3:30 (IRST)
  - Summer (DST): UTC+4:30 (IRDT)

Lowzdar-e Sofla (Persian: لوزدرسفلي, also Romanized as Lowzdar-e Soflá and Lūzdar-e Soflá; also known as Lourzdar-e Soflá, Lowzdar-e Pā’īn, and Lūzdar) is a village in Hendudar Rural District, Sarband District, Shazand County, Markazi Province, Iran. At the 2006 census, its population was 25, in 7 families.
