= Malmir =

Village in Markazi province, Iran

Malmir Persian: مالمير
- Village
- Location within Iran
- Coordinates: 33°45′00″N 49°07′05″E
- Country: Iran
- Province: Markazi
- County: Shazand
- District: Sarband
- Rural District: Malmir

Population (2016)
  - Total: 619
- Time zone: UTC+3:30 (IRST)

Malmir (Persian: مالمير) (Note: Also romanized as Māl Mīr, Māl-e Mīr, and Mālmīr) is a village in Malmir Rural District of Sarband District (Note: Formerly Hendudar District) in Shazand County, (Note: Formerly Sarband County) Markazi province, Iran.

== Demographics ==
=== Population ===
At the time of the 2006 National Census, the village's population was 690 in 211 households. The following census in 2011 counted 571 people in 200 households. The 2016 census measured the population of the village as 619 people in 237 households, the most populous in its rural district.
