= Qaleh-ye Aqa Hamid =

Village in Markazi province, Iran

Qaleh-ye Aqa Hamid Persian: قلعه اقاحميد
- Village
- Location within Iran
- Coordinates: 33°52′56″N 49°20′03″E
- Country: Iran
- Province: Markazi
- County: Shazand
- District: Central
- Rural District: Astaneh

Population (2016)
  - Total: 1,245
- Time zone: UTC+3:30 (IRST)

Qaleh-ye Aqa Hamid (Persian: قلعه اقاحميد) (Note: Also romanized as Qal‘eh-ye Āqā Ḩamīd) is a village in Astaneh Rural District of the Central District in Shazand County, (Note: Formerly Sarband County) Markazi province, Iran.

== Demographics ==
=== Population ===
At the time of the 2006 National Census, the village's population was 1,244 in 329 households. The following census in 2011 counted 1,384 people in 423 households. At the 2016 census, the village population was 1,245 people in 420 households, the most populous in its rural district.
