= Deh-e Davud =

Village in Markazi province, Iran

Deh-e Davud Persian: ده داود
- Village
- Location within Iran
- Coordinates: 33°50′26″N 49°14′39″E
- Country: Iran
- Province: Markazi
- County: Shazand
- District: Sarband
- Rural District: Hendudar

Population (2016)
  - Total: 217
- Time zone: UTC+3:30 (IRST)

Deh-e Davud (Persian: ده داود) (Note: Also romanized as Deh-e Dāvūd; also known as Deh Dāūd and Deh Dāvod) is a village in Hendudar Rural District (Note: Formerly Sarband Rural District) of Sarband District (Note: Formerly Hendudar District) in Shazand County, (Note: Formerly Sarband County) Markazi province, Iran.

== Demographics ==
=== Population ===
At the time of the 2006 National Census, the village's population was 283 in 79 households. The following census in 2011 counted 271 people in 79 households. The 2016 census measured the population of the village as 217 people in 71 households.
