= Azodiyeh =

Village in Markazi province, Iran

Azodiyeh Persian: عضديه
- Village
- Location within Iran
- Coordinates: 33°49′39″N 49°23′27″E
- Country: Iran
- Province: Markazi
- County: Shazand
- District: Central
- Rural District: Astaneh

Population (2016)
  - Total: 287
- Time zone: UTC+3:30 (IRST)

Azodiyeh (Persian: عضديه) (Note: Also romanized as Āzādiyeh, Azodīyeh, and ‘Aẕodīyeh; also known as Qal‘eh Sheykh and Qal‘eh-ye ‘Azodīyeh) is a village in, and the capital of, Astaneh Rural District in the Central District of Shazand County, (Note: Formerly Sarband County) Markazi province, Iran.

== Demographics ==
=== Population ===
At the time of the 2006 National Census, the village's population was 400 in 128 households. The following census in 2011 counted 331 people in 120 households. The 2016 census measured the population of the village as 287 people in 116 households.
