= Tavan Dasht-e Sofla =

Tavan Dasht-e Sofla تواندشتسفلي
- Village
- Location within Iran
- Coordinates: 33°42′59″N 49°03′25″E
- Country: Iran
- Province: Markazi
- County: Shazand
- Bakhsh: Sarband
- Rural District: Malmir

Population (2006)
  - Total: 14
- Time zone: UTC+3:30 (IRST)
  - Summer (DST): UTC+4:30 (IRDT)

Tavan Dasht-e Sofla (Persian: تواندشتسفلي, also Romanized as Tavān Dasht-e Soflá and Tavāndasht-e Soflá; also known as Tavāndasht-e Pā’īn and Tawān Dasht) is a village in Malmir Rural District, Sarband District, Shazand County, Markazi Province, Iran. At the 2006 census, its population was 14, in 4 families.
