= Borj-e Cheshmeh-ye Mahmud =

Village in Markazi province, Iran

Borj-e Cheshmeh-ye Mahmud Persian: برج چشمه محمود
- Village
- Location within Iran
- Coordinates: 33°44′14″N 49°22′17″E
- Country: Iran
- Province: Markazi
- County: Shazand
- District: Central
- Rural District: Astaneh

Population (2016)
  - Total: 99
- Time zone: UTC+3:30 (IRST)

Borj-e Cheshmeh-ye Mahmud (Persian: برج چشمه محمود) (Note: Also romanized as Borj-e Chashmeh Maḩmūd, Borj-e Cheshmeh Maḩmūd, and Borj-e Cheshmeh-ye Maḩmūd; also known as Borj, Borj-e Lah, and Burj) is a village in Astaneh Rural District of the Central District in Shazand County, (Note: Formerly Sarband County) Markazi province, Iran.

== Demographics ==
=== Population ===
At the time of the 2006 National Census, the village's population was 134 in 28 households. The following census in 2011 counted 115 people in 30 households. At the 2016 census, the village population was 99 people in 30 households.
