= Chenarestan, Shazand =

Village in Markazi province, Iran

Chenarestan Persian: چنارستان
- Village
- Location within Iran
- Coordinates: 33°41′13″N 49°12′20″E
- Country: Iran
- Province: Markazi
- County: Shazand
- District: Sarband
- Rural District: Hendudar

Population (2016)
  - Total: 303
- Time zone: UTC+3:30 (IRST)

Chenarestan (Persian: چنارستان) (Note: Also romanized as Chenārestān) is a village in Hendudar Rural District (Note: Formerly Sarband Rural District) of Sarband District (Note: Formerly Hendudar District) in Shazand County, (Note: Formerly Sarband County) Markazi province, Iran.

== Demographics ==
=== Population ===
At the time of the 2006 National Census, the village's population was 541 in 130 households. The following census in 2011 counted 422 people in 120 households. The 2016 census measured the population of the village as 303 people in 104 households.
