= Parkaleh =

Village in Markazi province, Iran

Parkaleh Persian: پركله
- Village
- Location within Iran
- Coordinates: 33°54′58″N 49°16′50″E
- Country: Iran
- Province: Markazi
- County: Shazand
- District: Central
- Rural District: Astaneh

Population (2016)
  - Total: 200
- Time zone: UTC+3:30 (IRST)

Parkaleh (Persian: پركله) (Note: Also romanized as Parkeleh; also known as Fār Qal‘eh, Parkal, and Parkalehhā) is a village in Astaneh Rural District of the Central District in Shazand County, (Note: Formerly Sarband County) Markazi province, Iran.

== Demographics ==
=== Population ===
At the time of the 2006 National Census, the village's population was 293 in 72 households. The following census in 2011 counted 235 people in 74 households. At the 2016 census, the village population was 200 people in 69 households.
