= Kapar, Iran =

Village in Markazi province, Iran

Kapar Persian: كپر
- Village
- Location within Iran
- Coordinates: 33°44′48″N 49°29′13″E
- Country: Iran
- Province: Markazi
- County: Shazand
- District: Qarah Kahriz
- Rural District: Kuhsar

Population (2016)
  - Total: 60
- Time zone: UTC+3:30 (IRST)

Kapar (Persian: كپر) is a village in Kuhsar Rural District of Qarah Kahriz District in Shazand County, (Note: Formerly Sarband County) Markazi province, Iran.

== Demographics ==
=== Population ===
At the time of the 2006 National Census, the village's population was 118 in 20 households, when it was in the Central District. The following census in 2011 counted 84 people in 21 households, by which time the rural district had been separated from the district in the formation of Qarah Kahriz District. The 2016 census measured the population of the village as 60 people in 20 households.
