= Hashian =

Village in Markazi province, Iran

Hashian Persian: حشيان
- Village
- Location within Iran
- Coordinates: 33°47′09″N 49°04′14″E
- Country: Iran
- Province: Markazi
- County: Shazand
- District: Sarband
- Rural District: Malmir

Population (2016)
  - Total: 185
- Time zone: UTC+3:30 (IRST)

Hashian (Persian: حشيان) (Note: Also romanized as Hasheyān, Hashīān, and Ḩashīān; also known as Ḩasanīān) is a village in, and the capital of, Malmir Rural District in Sarband District (Note: Formerly Hendudar District) of Shazand County, (Note: Formerly Sarband County) Markazi province, Iran.

== Demographics ==
=== Population ===
At the time of the 2006 National Census, the village's population was 283 in 69 households. The following census in 2011 counted 195 people in 62 households. The 2016 census measured the population of the village as 185 people in 66 households.
