= Chal Homa =

Village in Markazi province, Iran

Chal Homa Persian: چال هما
- Village
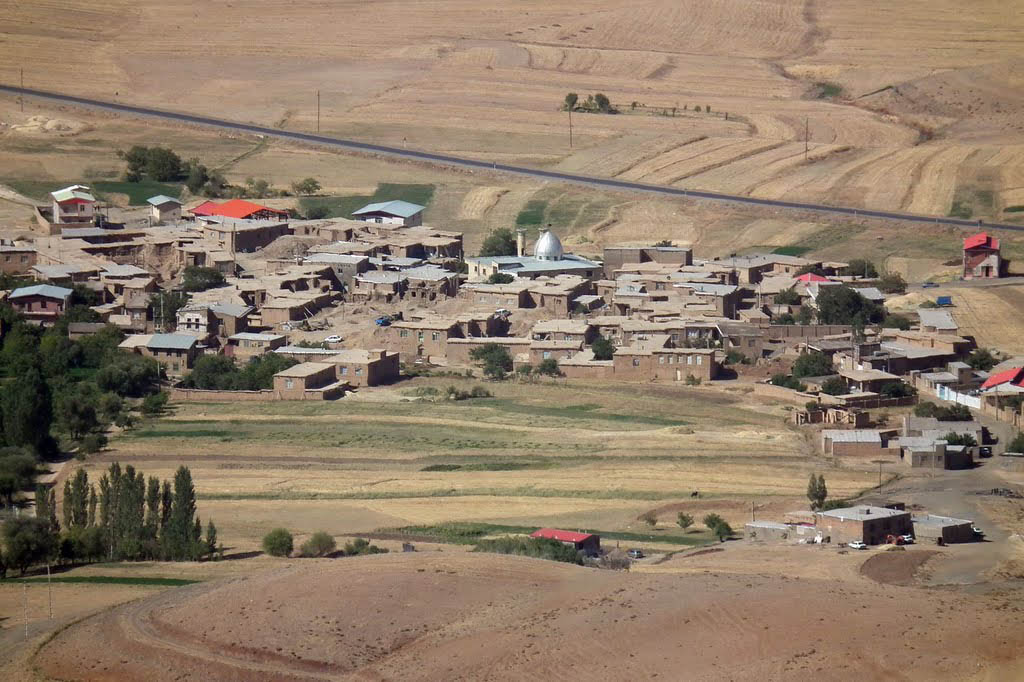
- The village of Chal Homa

- Location within Iran
- Coordinates: 33°48′17″N 49°16′51″E
- Country: Iran
- Province: Markazi
- County: Shazand
- District: Sarband
- Rural District: Hendudar

Population (2016)
  - Total: 209
- Time zone: UTC+3:30 (IRST)

Chal Homa (Persian: چال‌هما) (Note: Also romanized as Chāl Homā; also known as Chālmeh and Chhālma) is a village in Hendudar Rural District (Note: Formerly Sarband Rural District) of Sarband District (Note: Formerly Hendudar District) in Shazand County, (Note: Formerly Sarband County) Markazi province, Iran.

== Demographics ==
=== Population ===
At the time of the 2006 National Census, the village's population was 405 in 93 households. The following census in 2011 counted 291 people in 96 households. The 2016 census measured the population of the village as 209 people in 77 households.
