= Deh-e Kowsar =

Village in Markazi province, Iran

Deh-e Kowsar Persian: ده كوثر
- Village
- Location within Iran
- Coordinates: 33°50′20″N 49°12′51″E
- Country: Iran
- Province: Markazi
- County: Shazand
- District: Sarband
- Rural District: Hendudar

Population (2016)
  - Total: 220
- Time zone: UTC+3:30 (IRST)

Deh-e Kowsar (Persian: ده كوثر) (Note: Also romanized as Deh Kows̄ar and Deh-e Kows̄ar) is a village in Hendudar Rural District (Note: Formerly Sarband Rural District) of Sarband District (Note: Formerly Hendudar District) in Shazand County, (Note: Formerly Sarband County) Markazi province, Iran.

== Demographics ==
=== Population ===
At the time of the 2006 National Census, the village's population was 277 in 64 households. The following census in 2011 counted 271 people in 73 households. The 2016 census measured the population of the village as 220 people in 74 households.
