= Sar Sakhti-ye Bala =

Village in Markazi province, Iran

Sar Sakhti-ye Bala Persian: سرسختي بالا
- Village
- Location within Iran
- Coordinates: 33°50′05″N 49°21′29″E
- Country: Iran
- Province: Markazi
- County: Shazand
- District: Central
- Rural District: Astaneh

Population (2016)
  - Total: 526
- Time zone: UTC+3:30 (IRST)

Sar Sakhti-ye Bala (Persian: سرسختي بالا) (Note: Also romanized as Sar Sakhtī-ye Bālā; also known as Sabz Sanakhtī ‘Olyā, Sar Sakheī, Sar Sakhtī-ye ‘Olyā, Sarsakhleh, Sarsakteh, and Sarsakhtīyeh) is a village in Astaneh Rural District of the Central District in Shazand County, (Note: Formerly Sarband County) Markazi province, Iran.

== Demographics ==
=== Population ===
At the time of the 2006 National Census, the village's population was 726 in 259 households. The following census in 2011 counted 678 people in 270 households. At the 2016 census, the village population was 526 people in 223 households.
