= Deh-e Ali Morad, Markazi =

Deh-e Ali Morad ده علي مراد
- Village
- Location within Iran
- Coordinates: 33°47′07″N 49°04′42″E
- Country: Iran
- Province: Markazi
- County: Shazand
- Bakhsh: Sarband
- Rural District: Malmir

Population (2006)
  - Total: 151
- Time zone: UTC+3:30 (IRST)
  - Summer (DST): UTC+4:30 (IRDT)

Deh-e Ali Morad (Persian: ده علي مراد, also Romanized as Deh-e ‘Alī Morād and Deh ‘Alī Morād; also known as ‘Alī Morād and Deh ‘Ali Murād) is a village in Malmir Rural District, Sarband District, Shazand County, Markazi Province, Iran. At the 2006 census, its population was 151, in 41 families.
