= Tavan Dasht =

Tavan Dasht or Tavandasht or Tawan Dasht (Persian: تواندشتعليا) may refer to:

- Tavan Dasht-e Olya
- Tavan Dasht-e Sofla
