= BIAB =

BIAB may refer to:

- Band-in-a-Box, a software package
- Beijing International Art Biennale
- Brewing in a bag, a type of homebrewing
- Boys in a Band, a band
- British and Irish Archaeological Bibliography
- Bunsen is a Beast, a 2017 cartoon broadcast on Nickelodeon

== See also ==
- Bīāb
