= Hak-e Sofla =

Village in Markazi province, Iran

Hak-e Sofla Persian: حك سفلي
- Village
- Location within Iran
- Coordinates: 34°00′02″N 49°22′04″E
- Country: Iran
- Province: Markazi
- County: Shazand
- District: Central
- Rural District: Kazzaz

Population (2016)
  - Total: 442
- Time zone: UTC+3:30 (IRST)

Hak-e Sofla (Persian: حك سفلي) (Note: Also romanized as Ḩak-e Soflá and Ḩakk-e Soflá; also known as Ḩak-e Pā’īn and Ḩakk-e Pā’īn) is a village in Kazzaz Rural District of the Central District in Shazand County, (Note: Formerly Sarband County) Markazi province, Iran.

== Demographics ==
=== Population ===
At the time of the 2006 National Census, the village's population was 449 in 125 households, when it was in Pol-e Doab Rural District of Zalian District. The following census in 2011 counted 447 people in 141 households, by which time the village had been transferred to Kazzaz Rural District created in the Central District. The 2016 census measured the population of the village as 442 people in 148 households.
