= Vezmestan =

Vezmestan (Persian: وزمستان) may refer to:

- Vezmestan, Lorestan
- Vezmestan, Markazi
