= Sirna =

Sirna may refer to:

- Sírna, legendary High King of Ireland
- Șirna, a commune in Prahova County, Romania
- Sirna, Iran, a village in Markazi Province, Iran
- Small interfering RNA (siRNA)
- Syrna, also spelled Sirna, Greek village
- Syrna (island), also spelled Sirna, Greek island
- Sirna Therapeutics
