= Tavan Dasht-e Olya =

Village in Markazi province, Iran

Tavan Dasht-e Olya Persian: تواندشتعليا
- Village
- Location within Iran
- Coordinates: 33°43′48″N 49°03′48″E
- Country: Iran
- Province: Markazi
- County: Shazand
- District: Sarband
- Rural District: Malmir

Population (2016)
  - Total: 196
- Time zone: UTC+3:30 (IRST)

Tavan Dasht-e Olya (Persian: تواندشتعليا) (Note: Also romanized as Tavān Dasht-e ‘Olyā; also known as Tavān Dasht, Tavāndasht-e Bālā, and Tawān Dasht) is a village in Malmir Rural District of Sarband District (Note: Formerly Hendudar District) in Shazand County, (Note: Formerly Sarband County) Markazi province, Iran.

== Demographics ==
=== Population ===
At the time of the 2006 National Census, the village's population was 336 in 101 households. The following census in 2011 counted 272 people in 92 households. The 2016 census measured the population of the village as 196 people in 73 households.
