= Hak-e Olya =

Village in Markazi province, Iran

Hak-e Olya Persian: حك عليا
- Village
- Location within Iran
- Coordinates: 33°59′45″N 49°21′24″E
- Country: Iran
- Province: Markazi
- County: Shazand
- District: Central
- Rural District: Kazzaz

Population (2016)
  - Total: 319
- Time zone: UTC+3:30 (IRST)

Hak-e Olya (Persian: حك عليا) (Note: Also romanized as Ḩak-e ‘Olyā and Ḩakk-e ‘Olyā; also known as Ḩak-e Bālā, Hak-i-Bāla, Ḩakk-e Bālā, and Ḩakke-e Bālā) is a village in Kazzaz Rural District of the Central District in Shazand County, (Note: Formerly Sarband County) Markazi province, Iran.

== Demographics ==
=== Population ===
At the time of the 2006 National Census, the village's population was 373 in 99 households, when it was in Pol-e Doab Rural District of Zalian District. The following census in 2011 counted 340 people in 110 households, by which time the village had been transferred to Kazzaz Rural District created in the Central District. The 2016 census measured the population of the village as 319 people in 116 households.
