= Lowzdar-e Olya =

Village in Markazi province, Iran

Lowzdar-e Olya Persian: لوزدر عليا
- Village
- Location within Iran
- Coordinates: 33°43′43″N 49°18′56″E
- Country: Iran
- Province: Markazi
- County: Shazand
- District: Sarband
- Rural District: Hendudar

Population (2016)
  - Total: 483
- Time zone: UTC+3:30 (IRST)

Lowzdar-e Olya (Persian: لوزدرعليا) (Note: Also romanized as Lowzdar-e ‘Olyā and Lūzdar-e ‘Olyā; also known as Lowzdar, Lowzdar-e Bālā, Luzdar, Lūzdarbā, and Nuzdār) is a village in Hendudar Rural District (Note: Formerly Sarband Rural District) of Sarband District (Note: Formerly Hendudar District) in Shazand County, (Note: Formerly Sarband County) Markazi province, Iran.

== Demographics ==
=== Population ===
At the time of the 2006 National Census, the village's population was 539 in 136 households. The following census in 2011 counted 545 people in 171 households. The 2016 census measured the population of the village as 483 people in 163 households, the most populous in its rural district.
