= Chonas =

Chonas may refer to:

- Colossae, an ancient city of Phrygia
- Chonas, Iran, a village in Markazi Province, Iran
