= Aqaj Kandi =

Village in Markazi province, Iran

Aqaj Kandi Persian: اقاجكندي
- Village
- Location within Iran
- Coordinates: 33°44′55″N 49°01′29″E
- Country: Iran
- Province: Markazi
- County: Shazand
- District: Sarband
- Rural District: Malmir

Population (2016)
  - Total: 158
- Time zone: UTC+3:30 (IRST)

Aqaj Kandi (Persian: اقاجكندي) (Note: Also romanized as Aqa Jakandi, Āqā Jakandī, and Āqāj Kandī; also known as Āghāj Kandī and Āqāj Akanī) is a village in Malmir Rural District of Sarband District (Note: Formerly Hendudar District) in Shazand County, (Note: Formerly Sarband County) Markazi province, Iran.

== Demographics ==
=== Population ===
At the time of the 2006 National Census, the village's population was 188 in 46 households. The following census in 2011 counted 184 people in 57 households. The 2016 census measured the population of the village as 158 people in 52 households.
