= Kapar (disambiguation) =

Kapar may refer to:

- Kapar
- Kapar, Iran
- Kapar Judaki
- Kapar (federal constituency), represented in the Dewan Rakyat
