= Shahbaz, Iran =

City in Markazi province, Iran

Shahbaz Persian: شهباز
- City
- Location within Iran
- Coordinates: 33°52′30″N 49°32′49″E
- Country: Iran
- Province: Markazi
- County: Shazand
- District: Qarah Kahriz

Population (2016)
  - Total: 7,536
- Time zone: UTC+3:30 (IRST)

Shahbaz (Persian: شهباز) is a city in, and the capital of, Qarah Kahriz District in Shazand County, (Note: Formerly Sarband County) Markazi province, Iran.

== History ==
In 2010, Qarah Kahriz and Kuhsar Rural Districts were separated from the Central District in the formation of Qarah Kahriz District, with the village of Bazneh as its capital. Bazneh and the village of Hafteh merged to form the village of Hafteh and Bazneh.

== Demographics ==
=== Population ===
At the time of the 2011 National Census, the population (as the village of Hafteh and Bazneh) was 7,603 in 2,283 households. The following census in 2016 measured the population as 7,536 people in 2,375 households, by which time the village had been converted to a city and renamed Shahbaz.
