= Talkhestan, Markazi =

Talkhestan تلخستان
- Village
- Location within Iran
- Coordinates: 33°47′06″N 48°59′31″E
- Country: Iran
- Province: Markazi
- County: Shazand
- Bakhsh: Sarband
- Rural District: Malmir

Population (2006)
  - Total: 183
- Time zone: UTC+3:30 (IRST)
  - Summer (DST): UTC+4:30 (IRDT)

Talkhestan (Persian: تلخستان, also Romanized as Talkhestān; also known as Qal‘eh Khān, Qal‘eh-ye Khān, Qal‘eh-ye Sharīf Khān, and Talkestān) is a village in Malmir Rural District, Sarband District, Shazand County, Markazi Province, Iran. At the 2006 census, its population was 183, in 51 families.
