= Rashan =

Rashan may refer to:

- Rashan (given name)
- Rashan, Kosovo
- Rashan, Markazi, Iran
- Mehmed Reshan or Mahmad Rashan, a Yazidi saint
