= Akani =

Akani may refer to

- Akani Simbine (born 1993), South African sprinter
- Sunny Akani (Akani Songsermsawad, born 1995), Thai snooker player
- Akani, a dialect of Nanai language

== See also ==
- Aqa Jakandi, a village in Iran
