= Kazzaz Rural District =

Rural district in Markazi province, Iran

Kazzaz Rural District Persian: دهستان کزاز
- Rural District
- Location within Iran
- Coordinates: 33°56′N 49°24′E
- Country: Iran
- Province: Markazi
- County: Shazand
- District: Central
- Established: 2010
- Capital: Qadamgah

Population (2016)
  - Total: 12,014
- Time zone: UTC+3:30 (IRST)

Kazzaz Rural District (Persian: دهستان کزاز) is in the Central District of Shazand County, (Note: Formerly Sarband County) Markazi province, Iran. Its capital is the village of Qadamgah.

== History ==
In 2010 Kazzaz Rural District was created in the Central District.

== Demographics ==
=== Population ===
At the time of the 2011 National Census, the rural district's population was 13,161 in 3,979 households. The 2016 census measured the population of the rural district as 12,014 in 3,912 households. The most populous of its 17 villages was Qadamgah, with 1,963 people.

=== Other villages in the rural district ===
- Akbarabad
- Alborz
- Aliabad
- Cheshmeh-ye Sar
- Dehpul
- Ghinar
- Hak-e Olya
- Hak-e Sofla
- Jamalabad
- Kazzaz
- Rashan
- Sar Sakhti-ye Pain
- Suraneh
- Varaqa
