= Hendudar =

City in Markazi province, Iran

Hendudar Persian: هندودر
- City
- Location within Iran
- Coordinates: 33°46′48″N 49°13′50″E
- Country: Iran
- Province: Markazi
- County: Shazand
- District: Sarband

Population (2016)
  - Total: 1,918
- Time zone: UTC+3:30 (IRST)

Hendudar (Persian: هندودر) (Note: Also romanized as Hendūdar; also known as Hanūdār, Hendudur, Hendūdūr, Henūdar, and Hindūdar) is a city in, and the capital of, Sarband District (Note: Formerly Hendudar District) in Shazand County, (Note: Formerly Sarband County) Markazi province, Iran. It also serves as the administrative center for Hendudar Rural District. (Note: Formerly Sarband Rural District)

== Demographics ==
=== Population ===
At the time of the 2006 National Census, the city's population was 1,863 in 523 households. The following census in 2011 counted 2,003 people in 576 households. The 2016 census measured the population of the city as 1,918 people in 604 households.
