= Astaneh Rural District (Shazand County) =

Rural district in Markazi province, Iran

Astaneh Rural District Persian: دهستان آستانه
- Rural District
- Location within Iran
- Coordinates: 33°50′N 49°22′E
- Country: Iran
- Province: Markazi
- County: Shazand
- District: Central
- Established: 1986
- Capital: Azodiyeh

Population (2016)
  - Total: 5,479
- Time zone: UTC+3:30 (IRST)

Astaneh Rural District (Persian: دهستان آستانه) is in the Central District of Shazand County, (Note: Formerly Sarband County) Markazi province, Iran. Its capital is the village of Azodiyeh.

== Demographics ==
=== Population ===
At the time of the 2006 National Census, the rural district's population was 7,120 in 1,896 households. There were 6,540 inhabitants in 2,087 households at the following census of 2011. The 2016 census counted the population of the rural district at 5,479 in 1,976 households. The most populous of its 18 villages was Qaleh-ye Aqa Hamid, with 1,245 people.

=== Other villages in the rural district ===
- Borj
- Borj-e Cheshmeh-ye Mahmud
- Nurabad
- Pakal
- Palang Dar
- Parkaleh
- Qaleh-ye Abbasabad
- Qaleh-ye Baleman
- Sar Sakhti-ye Bala
- Zahirabad-e Astaneh
- Ziaabad
