= Shazand =

City in Markazi province, Iran

Shazand Persian: شازند
- City
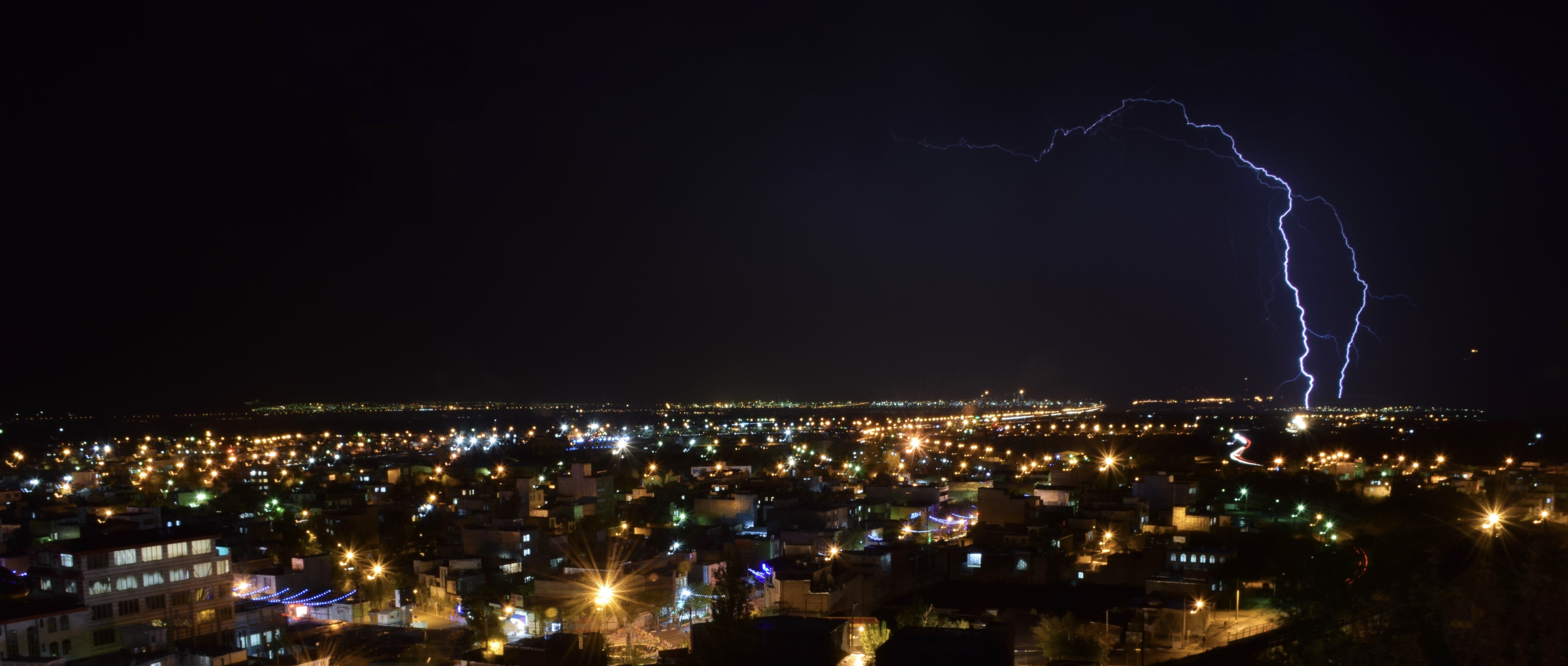
- The city of Shazand at night

- Location within Iran
- Coordinates: 33°55′45″N 49°24′37″E
- Country: Iran
- Province: Markazi
- County: Shazand
- District: Central

Population (2016)
  - Total: 21,181
- Time zone: UTC+3:30 (IRST)

Shazand (Persian: شازند) (Note: Also romanized as Shāzand; also known as Azadshahr (آزادشَهر), also romanized as Āzādshahr; and Shah Zand) is a city in the Central District of Shazand County, (Note: Formerly Sarband County) Markazi province, Iran, serving as capital of both the county and the district.

== Demographics ==
=== Population ===
At the time of the 2006 National Census, the city's population was 19,353 in 5,265 households. The following census in 2011 counted 21,156 people in 6,231 households. The 2016 census measured the population of the city as 21,181 people in 6,677 households.
