= Astaneh, Markazi =

City in Markazi province, Iran

Astaneh Persian: آستانه
- City
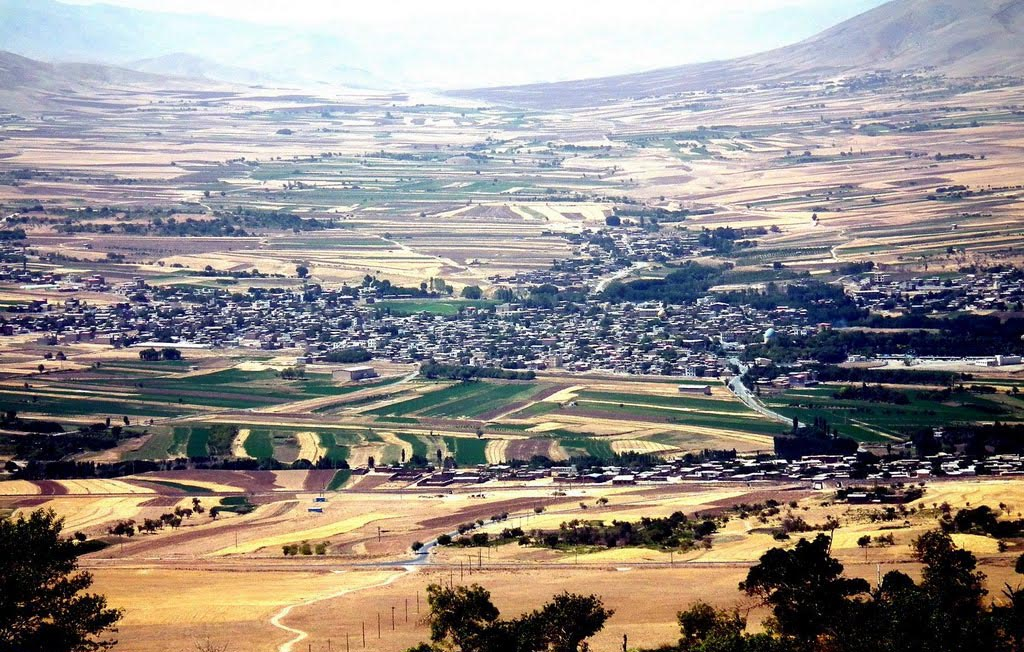
- Astaneh in summer

- Location within Iran
- Coordinates: 33°53′05″N 49°21′06″E
- Country: Iran
- Province: Markazi
- County: Shazand
- District: Central

Population (2016)
  - Total: 7,166
- Time zone: UTC+3:30 (IRST)

Astaneh (Persian: آستانه) (Note: Also romanized as Āstāneh) is a city in the Central District of Shazand County, (Note: Formerly Sarband County) Markazi province, Iran.

== Demographics ==
=== Population ===
At the time of the 2006 National Census, the city's population was 6,969 in 1,941 households. The following census in 2011 counted 6,880 people in 2,149 households. The 2016 census measured the population of the city as 7,166 people in 2,427 households.
