= Deh-e Ahmad, Kohgiluyeh and Boyer-Ahmad =

Village in Iran

Deh-e Ahmad ده احمد
- Village
- Location within Iran
- Coordinates: 31°18′24″N 50°21′48″E
- Country: Iran
- Province: Kohgiluyeh and Boyer-Ahmad
- County: Kohgiluyeh
- Bakhsh: Dishmok
- Rural District: Bahmayi-ye Sarhadi-ye Sharqi

Population (2006)
  - Total: 347
- Time zone: UTC+3:30 (IRST)
  - Summer (DST): UTC+4:30 (IRDT)

Deh-e Ahmad (Persian: ده احمد, also Romanized as Deh-e Aḩmad) is a village in Bahmayi-ye Sarhadi-ye Sharqi Rural District, Dishmok District, Kohgiluyeh County, Kohgiluyeh and Boyer-Ahmad Province, Iran. At the 2006 census, its population was 347, in 64 families.
