= Qaleh-ye Khan, Khuzestan =

Qaleh-ye Khan قلعه خان
- Village
- Location within Iran
- Coordinates: 31°53′12″N 48°53′14″E
- Country: Iran
- Province: Khuzestan
- County: Shushtar
- Bakhsh: Central
- Rural District: Miyan Ab

Population (2006)
  - Total: 268
- Time zone: UTC+3:30 (IRST)
  - Summer (DST): UTC+4:30 (IRDT)

Qaleh-ye Khan (Persian: قلعه خان, also Romanized as Qal‘eh-ye Khān and Qal’eh Khān; also known as Ghal‘eh Khan) is a village in Miyan Ab Rural District, in the Central District of Shushtar County, Khuzestan Province, Iran. At the 2006 census, its population was 268, in 53 families.
