= Ali Moradi =

Ali Moradi علي مرادي
- Village
- Location within Iran
- Coordinates: 31°23′00″N 54°22′02″E
- Country: Iran
- Province: Yazd
- County: Mehriz
- Bakhsh: Central
- Rural District: Tang Chenar

Population (2006)
  - Total: 79
- Time zone: UTC+3:30 (IRST)
  - Summer (DST): UTC+4:30 (IRDT)

Ali Moradi (Persian: علي مرادي, also Romanized as ‘Alī Morādī; also known as Ali Morad and ‘Ali Murādi) is a village in Tang Chenar Rural District, in the Central District of Mehriz County, Yazd Province, Iran. In the 2006 census, its population was 79, in 22 families.
