= Talkhestan, Kermanshah =

Talkhestan تلخستان
- Village
- Location within Iran
- Coordinates: 34°46′25″N 47°21′28″E
- Country: Iran
- Province: Kermanshah
- County: Sonqor
- Bakhsh: Kolyai
- Rural District: Satar

Population (2006)
  - Total: 70
- Time zone: UTC+3:30 (IRST)
  - Summer (DST): UTC+4:30 (IRDT)

Talkhestan (Persian: تلخستان, also Romanized as Talkhestān) is a village in Satar Rural District, Kolyai District, Sonqor County, Kermanshah Province, Iran. At the 2006 census, its population was 70, in 18 families.
