= Tavan, West Azerbaijan =

Tavan توان
- Village
- Location within Iran
- Coordinates: 36°51′48″N 45°12′35″E
- Country: Iran
- Province: West Azerbaijan
- County: Piranshahr
- Bakhsh: Lajan
- Rural District: Lahijan-e Sharqi

Population (2006)
  - Total: 190
- Time zone: UTC+3:30 (IRST)
  - Summer (DST): UTC+4:30 (IRDT)

Tavan (Persian: توان, also Romanized as Tavān and Tovān) is a village in Lahijan-e Sharqi Rural District, Lajan District, Piranshahr County, West Azerbaijan Province, Iran. At the 2006 census, its population was 190, in 25 families.
