= Kuhsar Rural District (Shazand County) =

Rural district in Markazi province, Iran

Kuhsar Rural District Persian: دهستان كوهسار
- Rural District
- Location within Iran
- Coordinates: 33°46′N 49°32′E
- Country: Iran
- Province: Markazi
- County: Shazand
- District: Qarah Kahriz
- Established: 1997
- Capital: Hajjiabad

Population (2016)
  - Total: 2,088
- Time zone: UTC+3:30 (IRST)

Kuhsar Rural District (Persian: دهستان كوهسار) is in Qarah Kahriz District of Shazand County, (Note: Formerly Sarband County) Markazi province, Iran. Its capital is the village of Hajjiabad.

== Demographics ==
=== Population ===
At the time of the 2006 National Census, the rural district's population (as a part of the Central District) was 3,150 in 727 households. There were 2,611 inhabitants in 769 households at the following census of 2011, by which time the rural district had been separated from the district in the formation of Qarah Kahriz District. The 2016 census measured the population of the rural district as 2,088 in 709 households. The most populous of its 15 villages was Hoseynabad, with 400 people.

=== Other villages in the rural district ===
- Choqa Pahneh
- Deh-e Ahmad
- Gurchak
- Jalalabad
- Kapar
- Mahmudabad
- Qaqan
- Rowghani
- Venavi
- Zangdar
