= Deh-e Ali Morad, Sistan and Baluchestan =

Deh-e Ali Morad ده عليمراد
- Village
- Location within Iran
- Coordinates: 31°08′28″N 61°46′05″E
- Country: Iran
- Province: Sistan and Baluchestan
- County: Hirmand
- Bakhsh: Central
- Rural District: Dust Mohammad

Population (2006)
  - Total: 487
- Time zone: UTC+3:30 (IRST)
  - Summer (DST): UTC+4:30 (IRDT)

Deh-e Ali Morad (Persian: ده عليمراد, also Romanized as Deh-e ‘Alī Morād; also known as ‘Alī Morād) is a village in Dust Mohammad Rural District, in the Central District of Hirmand County, Sistan and Baluchestan Province, Iran. At the 2006 census, its population was 487, in 108 families.
