= Malmir Rural District =

Rural district in Markazi province, Iran

Malmir Rural District Persian: دهستان مالمير
- Rural District
- Location within Iran
- Coordinates: 33°47′N 49°04′E
- Country: Iran
- Province: Markazi
- County: Shazand
- District: Sarband
- Established: 1986
- Capital: Hashian

Population (2016)
  - Total: 2,631
- Time zone: UTC+3:30 (IRST)

Malmir Rural District (Persian: دهستان مالمير) is in Sarband District (Note: Formerly Hendudar District) of Shazand County, (Note: Formerly Sarband County) Markazi province, Iran. Its capital is the village of Hashian.

== Demographics ==
=== Population ===
At the time of the 2006 National Census, the rural district's population was 4,021 in 1,091 households. There were 3,189 inhabitants in 1,008 households at the following census of 2011. The 2016 census measured the population of the rural district as 2,631 in 952 households. The most populous of its 26 villages was Malmir, with 619 people.

=== Other villages in the rural district ===
- Aqaj Kandi
- Gol-e Zard-e Abdi
- Hajji Beyg
- Khoshkehdar-e Malmir
- Niazagheh
- Tavan Dasht-e Olya
