= Hendudar Rural District =

Rural district in Markazi province, Iran

Hendudar Rural District Persian: دهستان هندودر
- Rural District
- Location within Iran
- Coordinates: 33°45′N 49°14′E
- Country: Iran
- Province: Markazi
- County: Shazand
- District: Sarband
- Established: 1986
- Capital: Hendudar

Population (2016)
  - Total: 5,665
- Time zone: UTC+3:30 (IRST)

Hendudar Rural District (Persian: دهستان هندودر) (Note: Formerly Sarband Rural District (دهستان سربند)) is in Sarband District (Note: Formerly Hendudar District) of Shazand County, (Note: Formerly Sarband County) Markazi province, Iran. It is administered from the city of Hendudar.

== Demographics ==
=== Population ===
At the time of the 2006 National Census, the rural district's population was 8,608 in 2,050 households. There were 6,784 inhabitants in 2,025 households at the following census of 2011. The 2016 census measured the population of the rural district as 5,665 in 1,964 households. The most populous of its 71 villages was Lowzdar-e Olya, with 483 people.

=== Other villages in the rural district ===
- Ali-ye Qurchi
- Chal Homa
- Chenarestan
- Deh-e Davud
- Deh-e Kowsar
- Kohneh Hesar
- Qaidan
