= Qarah Kahriz Rural District =

Rural district in Markazi province, Iran

Qarah Kahriz Rural District Persian: دهستان قره كهريز
- Rural District
- Location within Iran
- Coordinates: 33°52′N 49°34′E
- Country: Iran
- Province: Markazi
- County: Shazand
- District: Qarah Kahriz
- Established: 1986
- Capital: Amarat

Population (2016)
  - Total: 8,495
- Time zone: UTC+3:30 (IRST)

Qarah Kahriz Rural District (Persian: دهستان قره كهريز) is in Qarah Kahriz District of Shazand County, (Note: Formerly Sarband County) Markazi province, Iran. Its capital is the village of Amarat. The previous capital of the rural district was the village of Hafteh, now a neighborhood in the city of Shahbaz.

== Demographics ==
=== Population ===
At the time of the 2006 National Census, the rural district's population (as a part of the Central District) was 25,040 in 6,627 households. There were 16,509 inhabitants in 4,974 households at the following census of 2011, by which time the rural district had been separated from the district in the formation of Qarah Kahriz District. The 2016 census measured the population of the rural district as 8,495 in 2,852 households. The most populous of its 17 villages was Bagh-e Bar Aftab, with 1,755 people.

=== Other villages in the rural district ===
- Ab Barik
- Anbarteh
- Chenas
- Dastjerdeh
- Hesar-e Mohammadiyeh
- Kerk
- Muchan
- Qaleh-ye Dizijan
- Qaleh-ye Pasi Jan
- Tajareh
- Takyeh
- Tokhmar
- Vasheh
