= Sarband District (Iran) =

District in Markazi province, Iran

Sarband District Persian: بخش سربند
- District
- Location within Iran
- Coordinates: 33°45′N 49°10′E
- Country: Iran
- Province: Markazi
- County: Shazand
- Capital: Hendudar

Population (2016)
  - Total: 10,214
- Time zone: UTC+3:30 (IRST)

Sarband District (Persian: بخش سربند) (Note: Formerly Hendudar District (Persian: بخش هندودر)) is in Shazand County, (Note: Formerly Sarband County) Markazi province, Iran. Its capital is the city of Hendudar.

== Demographics ==
=== Population ===
At the time of the 2006 National Census, the district's population was 14,492 in 3,664 households. The following census in 2011 counted 12,076 people in 3,609 households. The 2016 census measured the population of the district as 10,214 inhabitants in 3,520 households.

=== Administrative divisions ===
Sarband District Population
Administrative Divisions	2006	2011	2016
Hendudar RD (Note: Formerly Sarband Rural District)	8,608	6,784	5,665
Malmir RD	4,021	3,189	2,631
Hendudar (city)	1,863	2,103	1,918
Total	14,492	12,076	10,214
RD = Rural District
