= Qarah Kahriz District =

District in Markazi province, Iran

Qarah Kahriz District Persian: بخش قره کهریز
- District
- Location within Iran
- Coordinates: 33°50′N 49°33′E
- Country: Iran
- Province: Markazi
- County: Shazand
- Established: 2010
- Capital: Shahbaz

Population (2016)
  - Total: 18,119
- Time zone: UTC+3:30 (IRST)

Qarah Kahriz District (Persian: بخش قره کهریز) is in Shazand County, (Note: Formerly Sarband County) Markazi province, Iran. Its capital is the city of Shahbaz. (Note: Formerly the village of Hafteh and Bazneh)

== History ==
In 2010, Qarah Kahriz and Kuhsar Rural Districts were separated from the Central District in the formation of Qarah Kahriz District. The village of Hafteh and Bazneh was converted to a city in 2012 and renamed Shahbaz.

== Demographics ==
=== Population ===
At the time of the 2011 National Census, the district's population was 19,120 in 5,743 households. The 2016 census measured the population of the district as 18,119 inhabitants in 5,936 households.

=== Administrative divisions ===
Qarah Kahriz District Population
Administrative Divisions	2011	2016
Kuhsar RD	2,611	2,088
Qarah Kahriz RD	16,509	8,495
Shahbaz (city)		7,536
Total	19,120	18,119
RD = Rural District
