= Central District (Shazand County) =

District in Markazi province, Iran

Central District (Shazand County) Persian: بخش مرکزی شهرستان شازند
- District
- Location within Iran
- Coordinates: 33°52′N 49°22′E
- Country: Iran
- Province: Markazi
- County: Shazand
- Capital: Shazand

Population (2016)
  - Total: 45,840
- Time zone: UTC+3:30 (IRST)

The Central District of Shazand County (Note: Formerly Sarband County) (Persian: بخش مرکزی شهرستان شازند) is in Markazi province, Iran. Its capital is the city of Shazand.

== History ==
In 2010, Kazzaz Rural District was created in the district, and Qarah Kahriz and Kuhsar Rural Districts were separated from it in the establishment of Qarah Kahriz District.

== Demographics ==
=== Population ===
At the time of the 2006 National Census, the district's population was 61,632 in 6,456 households. The following census in 2011 counted 47,737 people in 14,446 households. The 2016 census measured the population of the district as 45,840 inhabitants in 14,992 households.

=== Administrative divisions ===
Central District (Shazand County) Population
| Administrative Divisions | 2006 | 2011 | 2016 |
|---|---|---|---|
| Astaneh RD | 7,120 | 6,540 | 5,479 |
| Kazzaz RD | | 13,161 | 12,014 |
| Kuhsar RD (Note: Transferred to Qarah Kahriz District) | 3,150 | | |
| Qarah Kahriz RD | 25,040 | | |
| Astaneh (city) | 6,969 | 6,880 | 7,166 |
| Shazand (city) | 19,353 | 21,156 | 21,181 |
| Total | 61,632 | 47,737 | 45,840 |
RD = Rural District
