= Shazand County =

County in Markazi province, Iran

Shazand County Persian: شهرستان شازند
- County
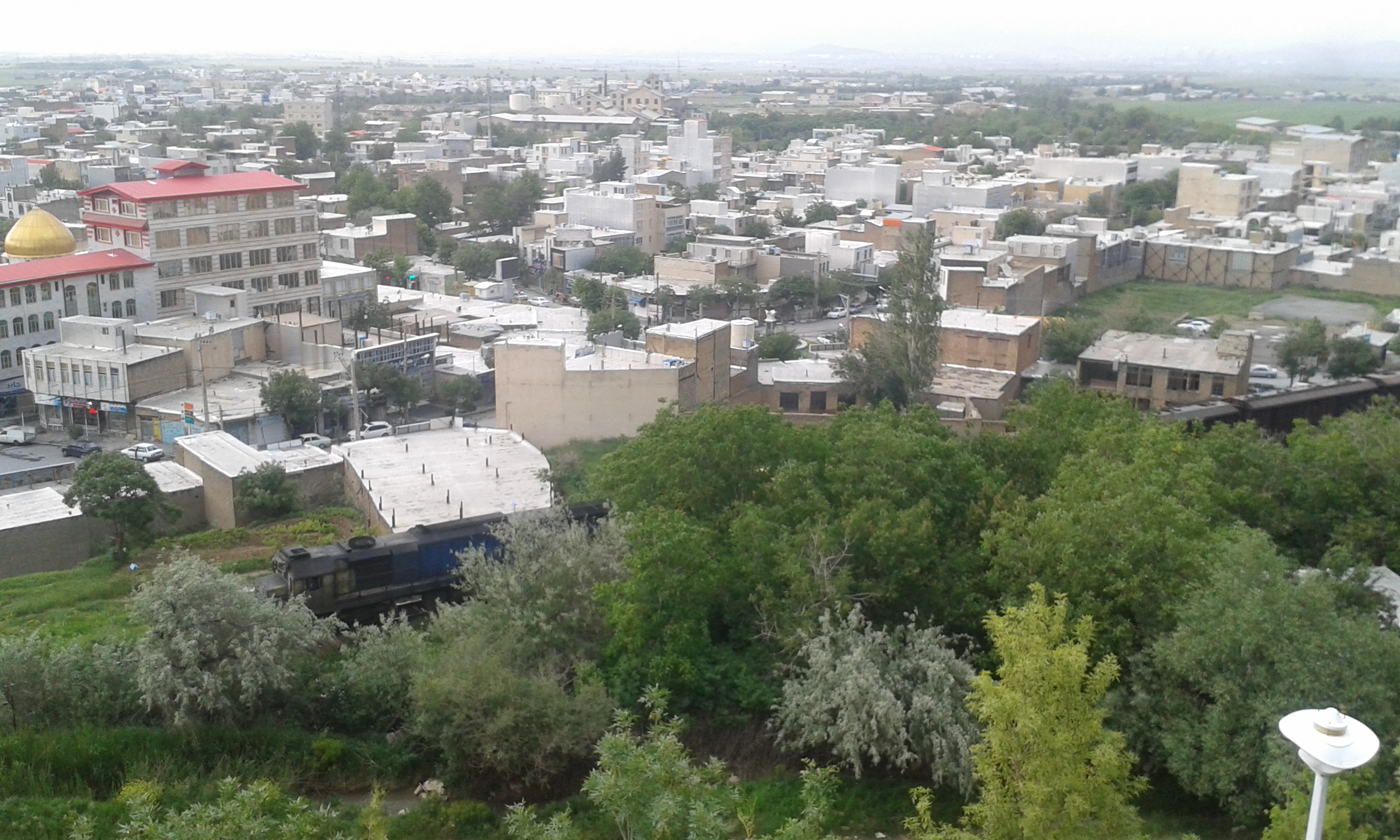
- The city of Shazand

- Location of Shazand County in Markazi province (bottom left, purple)

- Location of Markazi province in Iran
- Coordinates: 33°54′N 49°20′E
- Country: Iran
- Province: Markazi
- Capital: Shazand
- Districts: Central, Mahajeran, Qarah Kahriz, Sarband, Zalian

Population (2016)
  - Total: 117,571
- Time zone: UTC+3:30 (IRST)

Shazand County (Persian: شهرستان شازند) (Note: Formerly Sarband County (شهرستان سربند)) is in Markazi province, Iran. Its capital is the city of Shazand.

== History ==
In 2010, Kazzaz Rural District was created in the Central District, and Qarah Kahriz and Kuhsar Rural Districts were separated from it in the formation of Qarah Kahriz District. The village of Hafteh and Bazneh was converted to a city and renamed Shahbaz in 2012, and likewise the village of Mahajeran in 2015.

In 2024, the city of Mahajeran and 17 villages were separated from Zalian District in the formation of Mahajeran District, including the new Khosbijan and Mahajeran Rural Districts.

== Demographics ==
=== Population ===
At the time of the 2006 National Census, the county's population was 118,789 in 31,228 households. The following census in 2011 counted 117,746 people in 35,084 households. The 2016 census measured the population of the county as 117,571 in 38,214 households.

=== Administrative divisions ===
Shazand County's population history and administrative structure over three consecutive censuses are shown in the following table.

Shazand County Population
Administrative Divisions	2006	2011	2016
Central District	61,632	47,737	45,840
Astaneh RD	7,120	6,540	5,479
Kazzaz RD		13,161	12,014
Kuhsar RD	3,150		
Qarah Kahriz RD	25,040		
Astaneh (city)	6,969	6,880	7,166
Shazand (city)	19,353	21,156	21,181
Mahajeran District (Note: Established after the 2016 census)			
Khosbijan RD			
Mahajeran RD			
Mahajeran (city)			
Qarah Kahriz District		19,120	18,119
Kuhsar RD		2,611	2,088
Qarah Kahriz RD		16,509	8,495
Shahbaz (city) (Note: Formerly the village of Hafteh and Bazneh)			7,536
Sarband District (Note: Formerly Hendudar District)	14,492	12,076	10,214
Hendudar RD (Note: Formerly Sarband Rural District)	8,608	6,784	5,665
Malmir RD	4,021	3,189	2,631
Hendudar (city)	1,863	2,103	1,918
Zalian District	42,665	38,813	43,398
Nahr-e Mian RD (Note: Formerly Zalian Rural District)	9,741	8,945	8,245
Pol-e Doab RD	27,846	12,836	10,752
Zalian RD	2,911	2,408	1,753
Mahajeran (city)		12,293	20,346
Tureh (city)	2,167	2,331	2,302
Total	118,789	117,746	117,571
RD = Rural District

== See also ==
Media related to Shazand County at Wikimedia Commons
